= Musa boman =

Scientific classification
- Kingdom: Plantae
- Clade: Embryophytes
- Clade: Tracheophytes
- Clade: Spermatophytes
- Clade: Angiosperms
- Clade: Monocots
- Clade: Commelinids
- Order: Zingiberales
- Family: Musaceae
- Genus: Musa
- Species: M. boman

Binomial name
- Musa boman Argent

Species of wild banana

Musa boman is a species of wild banana (genus Musa), native to the West Sepik (Sandaun) Province of Papua New Guinea, in the eastern portion of the island of New Guinea. It is placed in section Callimusa (now including the former section Australimusa), having a diploid chromosome number of 2n = 20. The male bud is cream in colour.

Its relationships have been disputed. On the basis of appearance, it has been considered close to M. ingens, placed in a different section of the genus. However, it hybridizes with M. lolodensis, in section Callimusa, and is generally placed in the same section.
