= Musa × alinsanaya =

Scientific classification
- Kingdom: Plantae
- Clade: Tracheophytes
- Clade: Angiosperms
- Clade: Monocots
- Clade: Commelinids
- Order: Zingiberales
- Family: Musaceae
- Genus: Musa
- Section: Musa sect. Callimusa
- Species: M. × alinsanaya

Binomial name
- Musa × alinsanaya R.V.Valmayor

Species of flowering plant

Musa × alinsanaya is a Malesian tropical plant in the banana family (Musaceae), native to the Philippines. Only formally named in 2004, it is considered to be a hybrid between Musa banksii and Musa textilis. The flower bud is shiny green with purple inside. It produces small fruit with a high proportion of seeds.

== Uses ==
Traditionally the plant fibers of the petiole and pseudostem are used in the making of various ropes and strings.
