= Japanese banana =

Japanese banana may refer to one of the following banana plants:

- Musa basjoo, native to southern China
- Musa insularimontana, native to Taiwan

== See also ==
- the song "Japanese Banana", from the Alvin and the Chipmunks album Around the World with The Chipmunks
