= Musa exotica =

Scientific classification
- Kingdom: Plantae
- Clade: Embryophytes
- Clade: Tracheophytes
- Clade: Spermatophytes
- Clade: Angiosperms
- Clade: Monocots
- Clade: Commelinids
- Order: Zingiberales
- Family: Musaceae
- Genus: Musa
- Section: Musa sect. Callimusa
- Species: M. exotica

Binomial name
- Musa exotica R.V.Valmayor

Species of flowering plant

Musa exotica is a species of wild banana (genus Musa), native to Vietnam. It is placed in section Callimusa (now including the former section Australimusa), having a diploid chromosome number of 2n = 20. It was only described in 2004, from a collection in the Cúc Phương Forest Reservation, Ninh Bình Province, Vietnam. The clear orange bud is upright; small yellow bananas develop below the male flowers.
