= Musa monticola =

Conservation status
- Least Concern (IUCN 3.1)

Scientific classification
- Kingdom: Plantae
- Clade: Embryophytes
- Clade: Tracheophytes
- Clade: Spermatophytes
- Clade: Angiosperms
- Clade: Monocots
- Clade: Commelinids
- Order: Zingiberales
- Family: Musaceae
- Genus: Musa
- Section: Musa sect. Callimusa
- Species: M. monticola

Binomial name
- Musa monticola M.Hotta ex Argent

Species of flowering plant

Musa monticola, also known as the Kinabalu mountain banana, is a species of wild banana (genus Musa), native to Sabah on the island of Borneo. It is placed in section Callimusa (now including the former section Australimusa), having a diploid chromosome number of 2n = 20.

== Description ==
Musa monticola is an herbaceous phanerophyte with pseudostem growing to 1 to 2 meters high.

== Range and habitat ==
Musa monticola is known only from the Crocker Range in Sabah, on the slopes of Mount Kinabalu and along the Sinsuron Road, from 1,200 to 1,700 meters elevation.

It inhabits forest clearings and secondary vegetation, including roadsides, in lower montane rain forest.
