= Musa griersonii =

Conservation status
- Least Concern (IUCN 3.1)

Scientific classification
- Kingdom: Plantae
- Clade: Embryophytes
- Clade: Tracheophytes
- Clade: Spermatophytes
- Clade: Angiosperms
- Clade: Monocots
- Clade: Commelinids
- Order: Zingiberales
- Family: Musaceae
- Genus: Musa
- Section: Musa sect. Musa
- Species: M. griersonii

Binomial name
- Musa griersonii Noltie

Species of flowering plant

Musa griersonii is a species of wild banana (genus Musa). It is endemic to Bhutan.
