= Musa tuberculata =

Scientific classification
- Kingdom: Plantae
- Clade: Embryophytes
- Clade: Tracheophytes
- Clade: Spermatophytes
- Clade: Angiosperms
- Clade: Monocots
- Clade: Commelinids
- Order: Zingiberales
- Family: Musaceae
- Genus: Musa
- Section: Musa sect. Callimusa
- Species: M. tuberculata

Binomial name
- Musa tuberculata M.Hotta

Species of flowering plant

Musa tuberculata is a tropical Asian species of plant in the banana family native to the Malesian region (Brunei). It is one of fourteen species of Musa endemic to the island of Borneo. The specific epithet "tuberculata" is from the Latin meaning "covered with minute tubercles". M. tuberculata is placed in section Callimusa (now including the former section Australimusa), members of which have a diploid chromosome number of 2n = 20.
