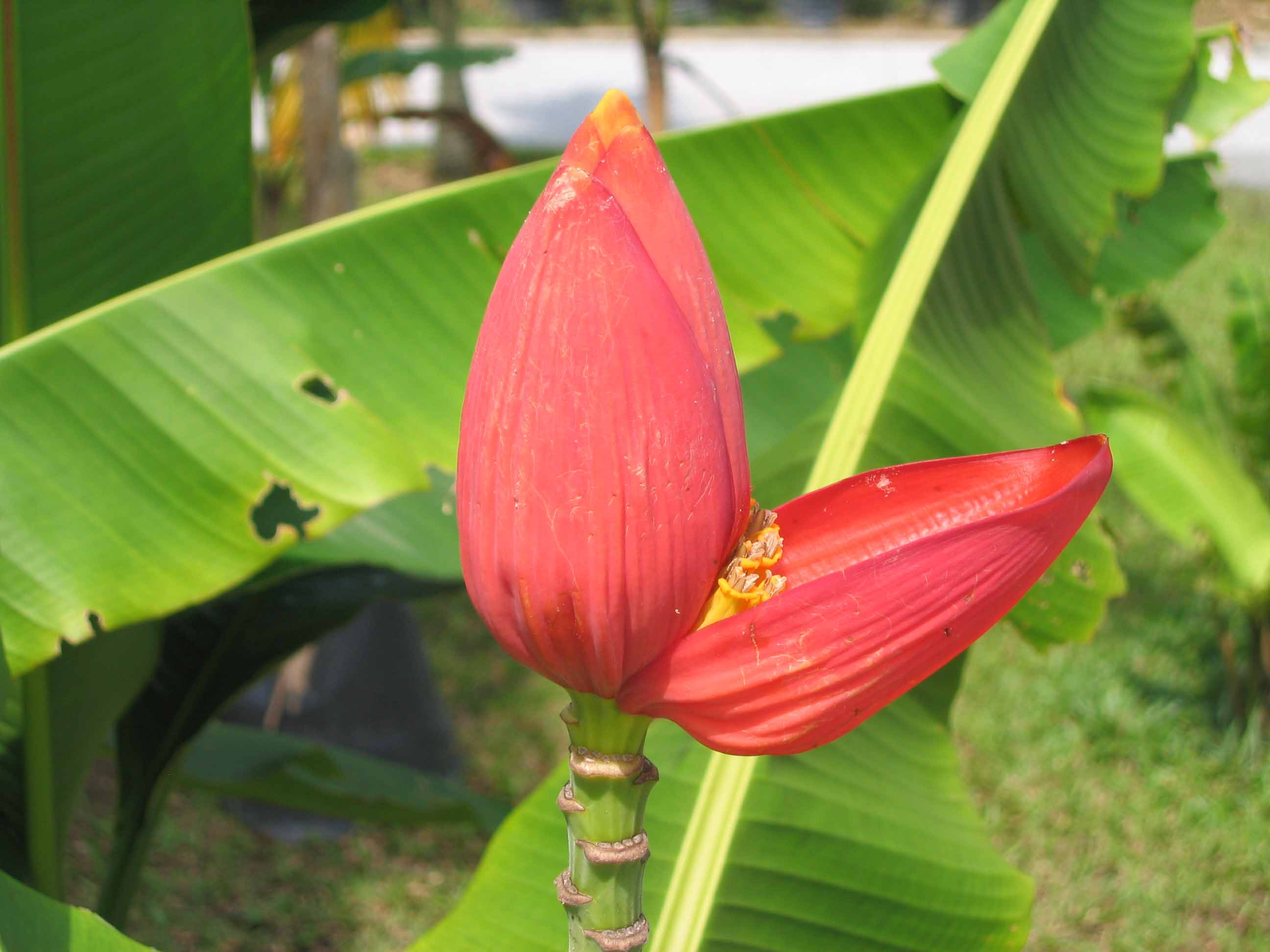
- At University of Malaya, Kuala Lumpur

Conservation status
- Least Concern (IUCN 3.1)

Scientific classification
- Kingdom: Plantae
- Clade: Embryophytes
- Clade: Tracheophytes
- Clade: Spermatophytes
- Clade: Angiosperms
- Clade: Monocots
- Clade: Commelinids
- Order: Zingiberales
- Family: Musaceae
- Genus: Musa
- Section: Musa sect. Callimusa
- Species: M. violascens

Binomial name
- Musa violascens Ridl.

= Musa violascens =

Species of flowering plant

Musa violascens is a species of wild banana (genus Musa), native to Peninsular Malaysia. It is placed in section Callimusa (now including the former section Australimusa), members of which have a diploid chromosome number of 2n = 20.
