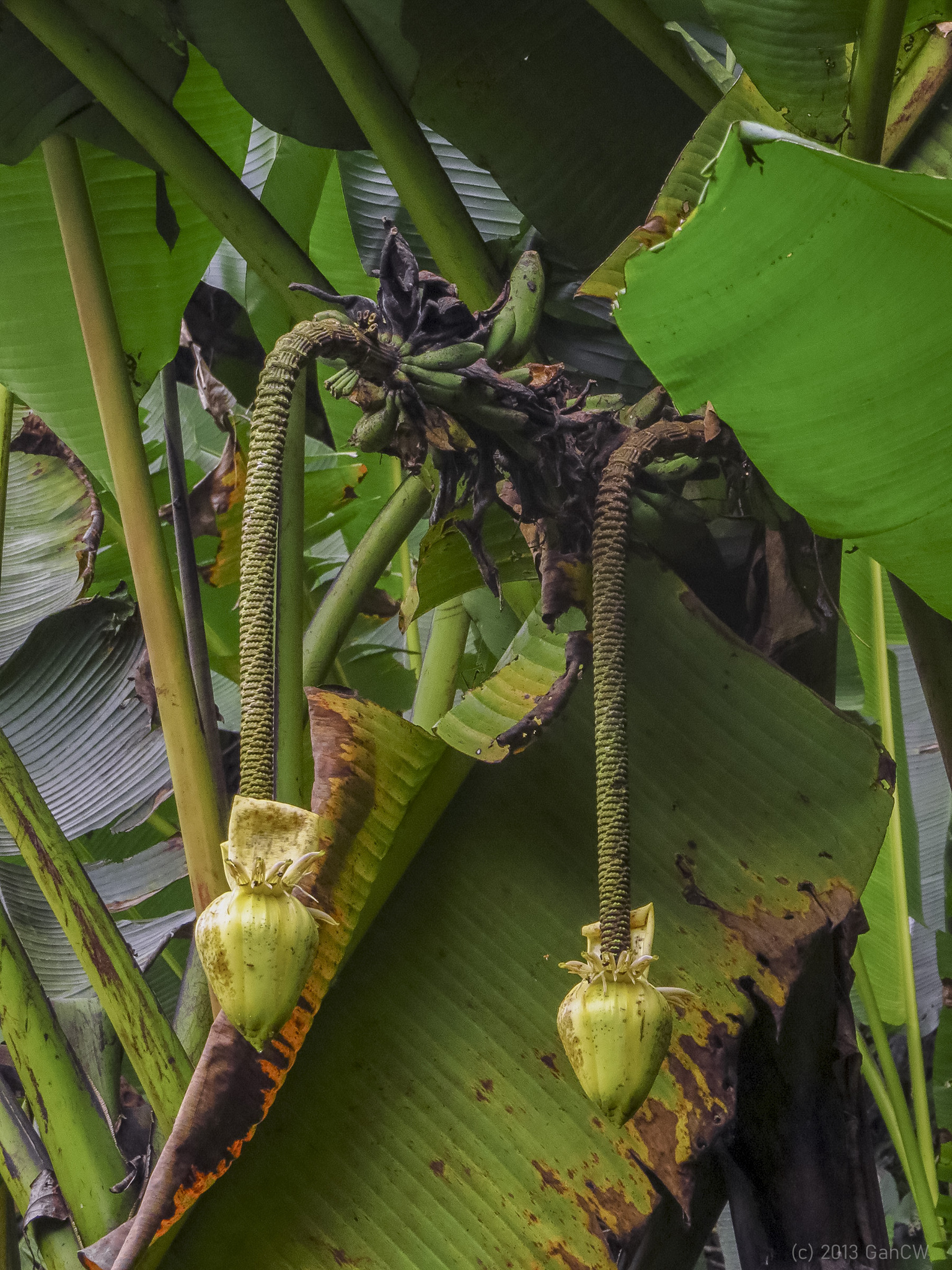

Conservation status
- Least Concern (IUCN 3.1)

Scientific classification
- Kingdom: Plantae
- Clade: Embryophytes
- Clade: Tracheophytes
- Clade: Spermatophytes
- Clade: Angiosperms
- Clade: Monocots
- Clade: Commelinids
- Order: Zingiberales
- Family: Musaceae
- Genus: Musa
- Section: Musa sect. Callimusa
- Species: M. borneensis

Binomial name
- Musa borneensis Becc.

= Musa borneensis =

Species of flowering plant

Musa borneensis is a species of wild banana (genus Musa), native to the island of Borneo, in the Malaysian states of Sabah and Sarawak. It is placed in section Callimusa (now including the former section Australimusa), having a diploid chromosome number of 2n = 20.

Musa borneensis has a slender psudostem which reaches up to 3.5 m high at maturity, with up to 9 suckers. It grows in lowland rain forests from 27 to 300 metres elevation.

Musa flavida M.Hotta is now considered to be only a variety of this species, M. borneensis var. flavida.
