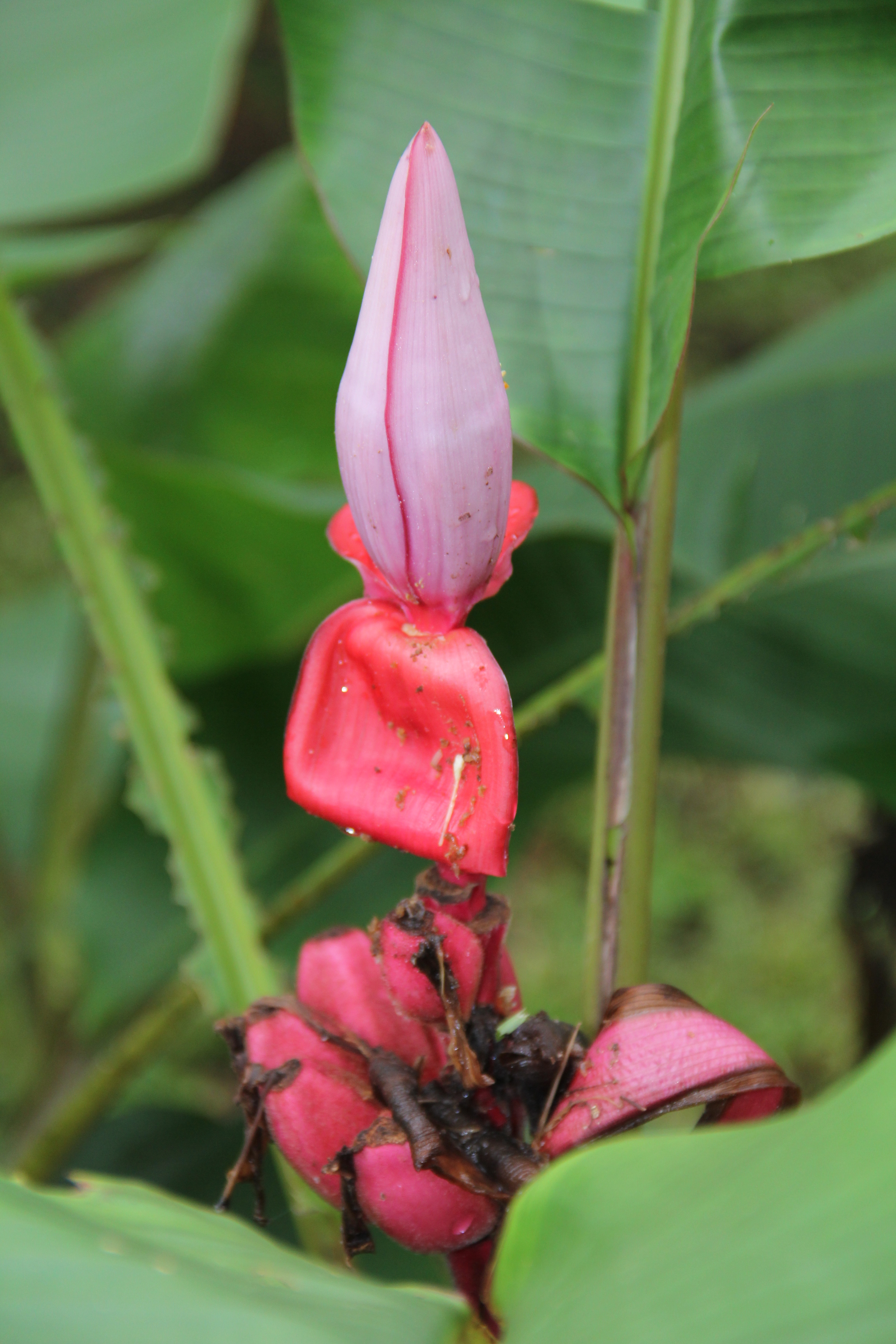
- Musa rosea flower
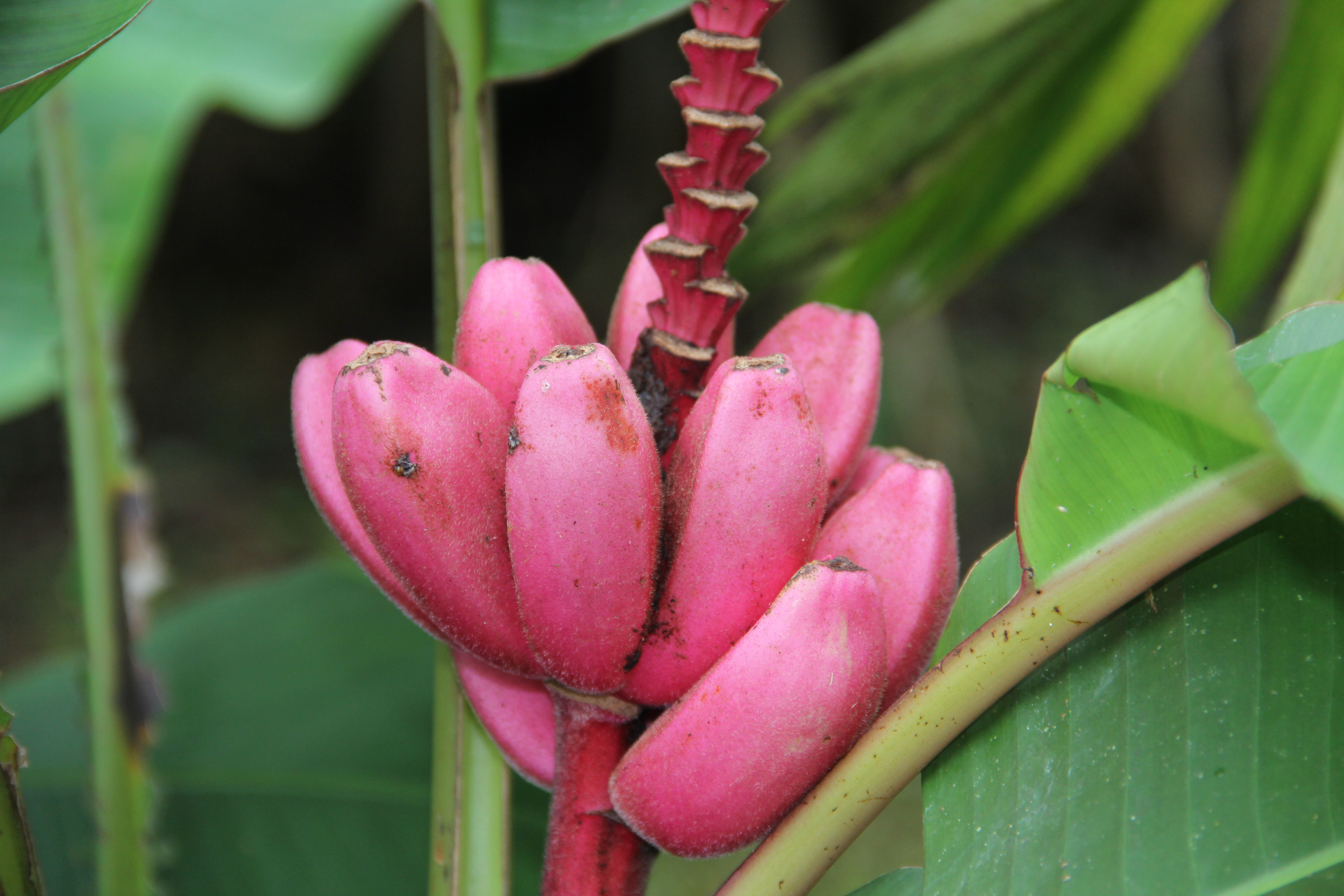
- Musa rosea banana

Scientific classification
- Kingdom: Plantae
- Clade: Embryophytes
- Clade: Tracheophytes
- Clade: Spermatophytes
- Clade: Angiosperms
- Clade: Monocots
- Clade: Commelinids
- Order: Zingiberales
- Family: Musaceae
- Genus: Musa
- Section: Musa sect. Musa
- Species: M. rosea

Binomial name
- Musa rosea Baker

= Musa rosea =

Species of flowering plant

Musa rosea is a species of wild banana (genus Musa).
