= Musa hirta =

Scientific classification
- Kingdom: Plantae
- Clade: Embryophytes
- Clade: Tracheophytes
- Clade: Spermatophytes
- Clade: Angiosperms
- Clade: Monocots
- Clade: Commelinids
- Order: Zingiberales
- Family: Musaceae
- Genus: Musa
- Section: Musa sect. Callimusa
- Species: M. hirta

Binomial name
- Musa hirta Becc.

Species of flowering plant

Musa hirta is a tropical Asian species of plant in the banana family native to Sarawak on the island of Borneo, in Malaysia. It is one of fourteen species of Musa endemic to the island of Borneo. It is placed in section Callimusa (now including the former section Australimusa), having a diploid chromosome number of 2n = 20.
