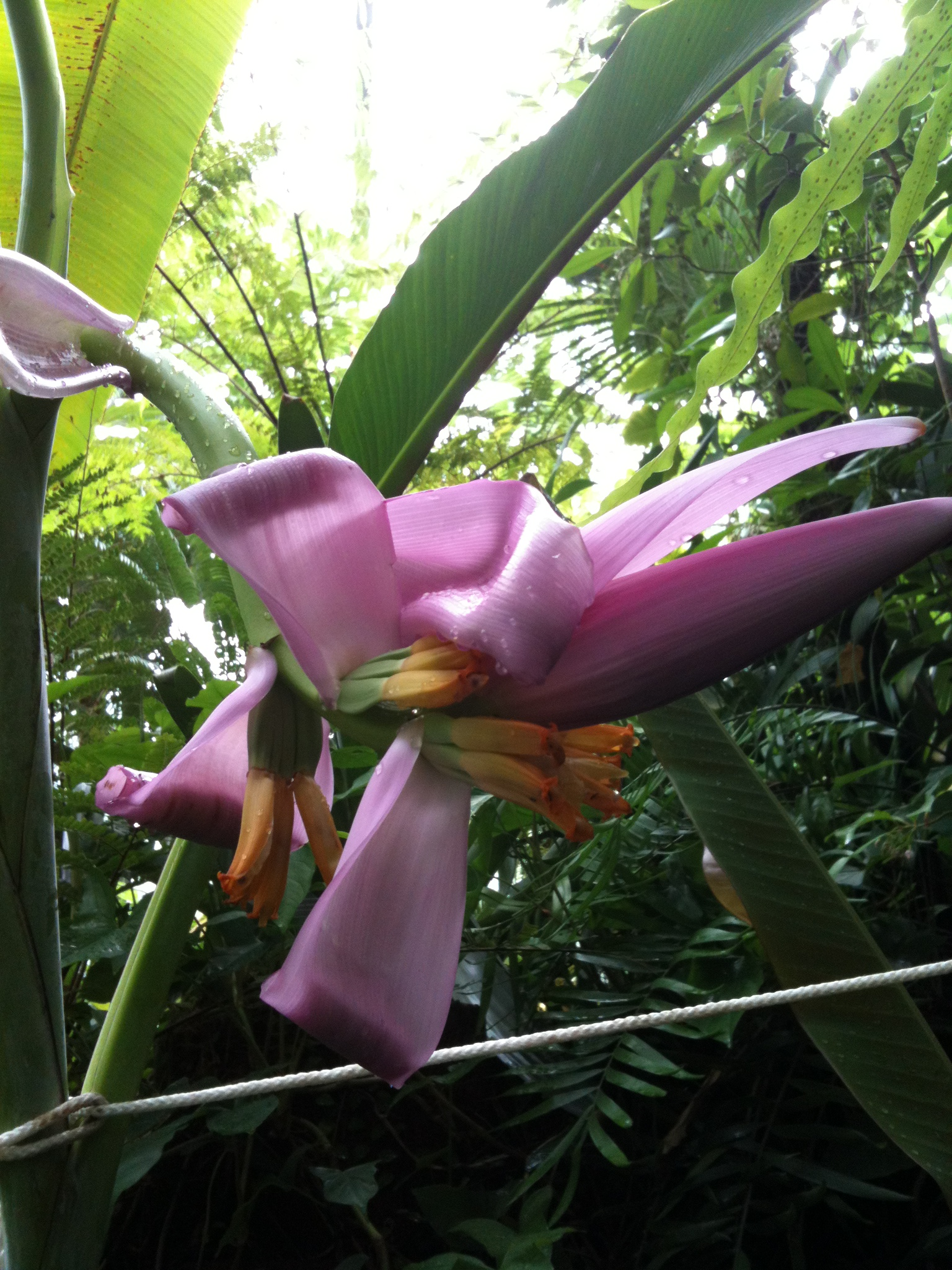

Conservation status
- Least Concern (IUCN 3.1)

Scientific classification
- Kingdom: Plantae
- Clade: Embryophytes
- Clade: Tracheophytes
- Clade: Spermatophytes
- Clade: Angiosperms
- Clade: Monocots
- Clade: Commelinids
- Order: Zingiberales
- Family: Musaceae
- Genus: Musa
- Section: Musa sect. Musa
- Species: M. rubra

Binomial name
- Musa rubra Wall. ex Kurz

Synonyms
- Musa laterita Cheesman

= Musa rubra =

Species of flowering plant

Musa rubra, synonym Musa laterita, is a species of wild banana (genus Musa), which is native to Assam Bangladesh, Myanmar and northern Thailand. Under its synonym M. laterita, it has been grown as an ornamental plant.
