= Musa salaccensis =

Javanese wild banana

Conservation status
- Least Concern (IUCN 3.1)

Scientific classification
- Kingdom: Plantae
- Clade: Embryophytes
- Clade: Tracheophytes
- Clade: Spermatophytes
- Clade: Angiosperms
- Clade: Monocots
- Clade: Commelinids
- Order: Zingiberales
- Family: Musaceae
- Genus: Musa
- Section: Musa sect. Callimusa
- Species: M. salaccensis

Binomial name
- Musa salaccensis Zoll. ex Kurz

Species of flowering plant

Musa salaccensis, commonly called Javanese wild banana, is a Malesian tropical species of plant in the banana family native to the islands of Sumatra and Java, in Indonesia. It is placed in section Callimusa (now including the former section Australimusa), members of which have a diploid chromosome number of 2n = 20.

== Uses ==
The terminal inflorescences and male flower buds are edible, and can be cooked, or used as an ingredient in salads.
