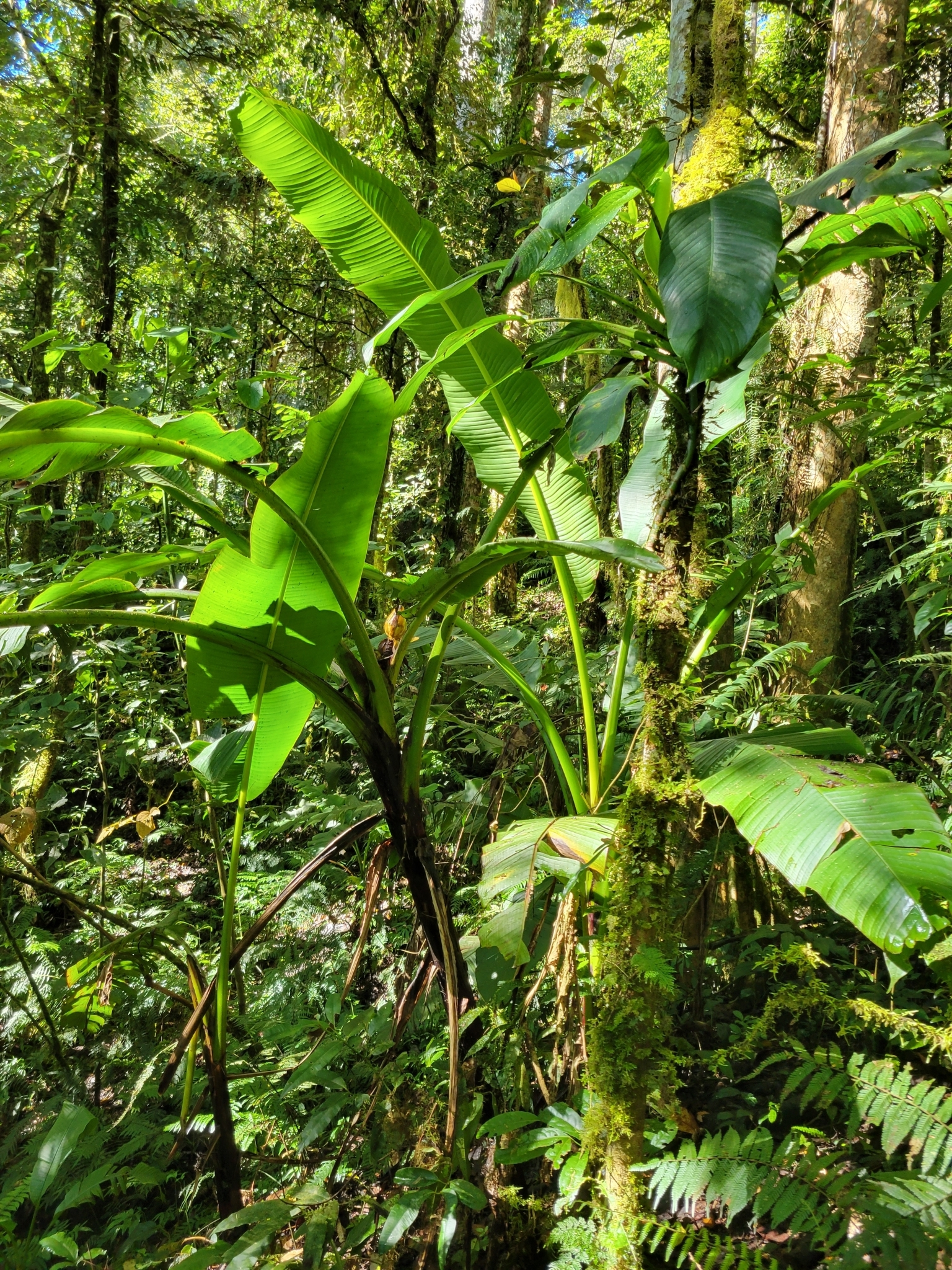

Scientific classification
- Kingdom: Plantae
- Clade: Tracheophytes
- Clade: Angiosperms
- Clade: Monocots
- Clade: Commelinids
- Order: Zingiberales
- Family: Musaceae
- Genus: Musa
- Species: M. arfakiana

Binomial name
- Musa arfakiana Argent 2010

= Musa arfakiana =

Species of wild banana

Musa arfakiana is a species of wild banana from the genus Musa (Musaceae)

== Distribution and origin ==
This species of wild banana was found in Indonesia, in Papua, and in the Manokwari Regency of West Papua.
