= Musa azizii =

Scientific classification
- Kingdom: Plantae
- Clade: Embryophytes
- Clade: Tracheophytes
- Clade: Spermatophytes
- Clade: Angiosperms
- Clade: Monocots
- Clade: Commelinids
- Order: Zingiberales
- Family: Musaceae
- Genus: Musa
- Section: Musa sect. Callimusa
- Species: M. azizii

Binomial name
- Musa azizii Häkkinen

Species of flowering plant

Musa azizii is a species of wild banana (genus Musa), native to Sarawak, Malaysia. It is placed in section Callimusa (now including the former section Australimusa), having a diploid chromosome number of 2n = 20.
