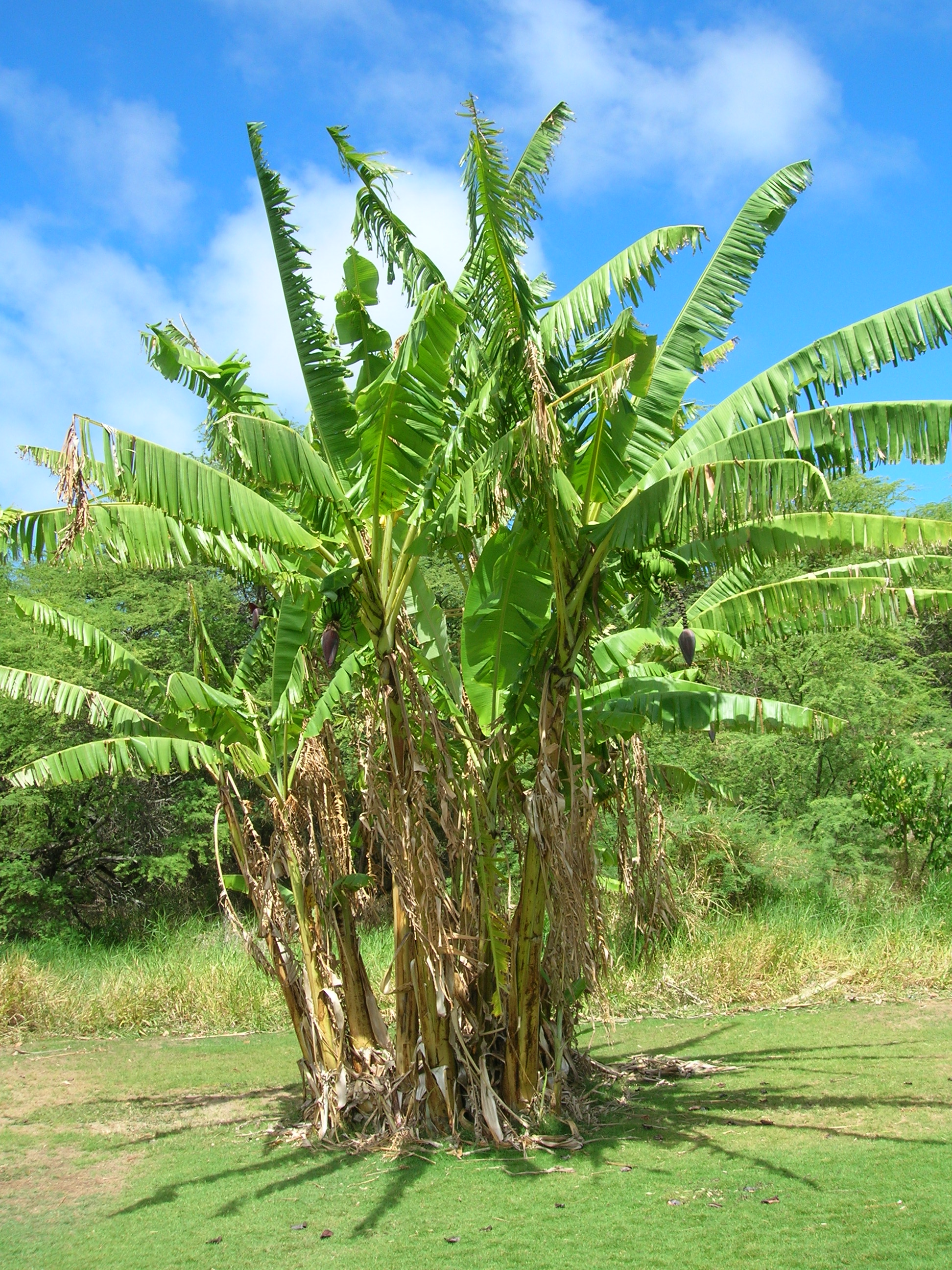
- Banana plants, Kanaha Beach, Maui

Scientific classification
- Kingdom: Plantae
- Clade: Tracheophytes
- Clade: Angiosperms
- Clade: Monocots
- Clade: Commelinids
- Order: Zingiberales
- Family: Musaceae
- Genus: Musa; L.

Type species
- Musa × paradisiaca L.

Species
- Around 80, see text.

= Musa (plant) =

Musa Temporal range: 66–0 Ma Paleogene – present

Genus of flowering plants

Musa is one of three genera in the family Musaceae. The genus includes 83 fruit species of flowering plants producing edible bananas and plantains (also known as cooking bananas), and fiber (abacá), used to make paper and cloth. Though they grow as high as trees, banana and plantain plants are not woody and their apparent "stem" is made up of the bases of the huge leaf stalks. Thus, they are technically gigantic herbaceous plants.

== Description ==
Banana plants are among the largest extant herbaceous plants, some reaching up to 9 m (30 ft) in height or 18 m (59 ft) in the case of Musa ingens. The large herb is composed of a modified underground stem (rhizome), a false trunk or pseudostem formed by the basal parts of tightly rolled leaves, a network of roots, and a large flower spike. A single leaf is divided into a leaf sheath, a contracted part called a petiole, and a terminal leaf blade. The false trunk is an aggregation of leaf sheaths; only when the plant is ready to flower does a true stem grow up through the sheath. At the end of this stem, a peduncle forms (with M. ingens having the second-longest peduncle known, exceeded only by Agave salmiana), bearing many female flowers protected by large purple-red bracts. The extension of the stem (the rachis) continues growth downward, where terminal male flowers grow. The leaves originate from a pseudostem and unroll to show a leaf blade with two lamina halves. The lamina can be as much as 7 m (23 ft) long in the case of M. acuminata subsp. truncata (syn. M. truncata) of the Malay Peninsula). Musa species reproduce by both sexual (seed) and asexual (suckers) processes, using asexual means when producing sterile (unseeded) fruits. Further qualities to distinguish Musa include spirally arranged leaves, fruits as berries, the presence of latex-producing cells, flowers with five connate tepals and one member of the inner whorl distinct, and a petiole with one row of air channels.

Bananas have a green skin when unripe. While plantains remain green all the way, many varieties change their skin to a yellow, orange or reddish colour as they ripen.

== Taxonomy ==
=== History ===
Pliny the Elder used the name ariena for the fruit of a tree found in India. It has been speculated that this might have been the banana, although Pliny says that a single fruit was sufficient to satisfy four persons.

During the late Middle Ages, international trade brought bananas to Europe, which created the need for a name. In the 11th century, Medieval Latin innovated a term musa: this was most likely (Note: Some sources assert that Musa is named for Antonius Musa, physician to the Emperor Augustus: see Bailey, Liberty Hyde (1914–1917). The Standard Cyclopedia of Horticulture. Vol. 4.. New York: Macmillan. OCLC 2768915.. Pp. 2076–9.) the latinization of the Arabic name for the fruit, mawz (موز). Thus, the 11th-century Arabic encyclopedia The Canon of Medicine, which was translated to Latin in medieval times and well known in Europe, shows a correspondence between Arabic mauz and Latin musa. (Note: Arabic Mauz meaning Musa or banana is in the medieval Arabic medical encyclopedia by Avicenna, which is online at Avicenna: Book Two. See also "Musa" at Dictionary.Reference.com. See also Musacées in Dictionnaire Étymologique Des Mots Français D'Origine Orientale, by L. Marcel Devic (year 1876).) Muz is also the Turkish, Persian, and Somali name for the fruit.

According to linguist Mark Donohue and archaeologist Tim Denham, the ultimate origin of the Latinized form musa is in the Trans–New Guinea languages, where certain cultivars of bananas are known under a form *muku. From there, the term was borrowed into the Austronesian languages of the area, and migrated across Asia, via the Dravidian languages of India, into Persian, Greek, and Arabic as a Wanderwort:

Possible transmission of musa from New Guinea to Latin
| Trans-New Guinea | Austronesian | Dravidian | Indic | Persian | Arabic | Greek | Latin |
| #mugu | #mugu > muku > muʼu | mōttai/mōte | mocā | mōč | mawz/mawza | mozā | musa |

The late Latin term musa was later chosen by Carl Linnaeus in 1753, as the name for the genus.

From the time of Linnaeus until the 1940s, different types of edible bananas and plantains were given Linnaean binomial names, such as Musa cavendishii, as if they were species. In fact, edible bananas have an extremely complicated origin involving hybridization, mutation, and finally selection by humans. Most edible bananas are seedless (parthenocarpic), hence sterile, so they are propagated vegetatively. The giving of species names to what are actually very complex, largely asexual, hybrids (mostly of two species of wild bananas, Musa acuminata and Musa balbisiana) led to endless confusion in banana botany. In the 1940s and 1950s, it became clear to botanists that the cultivated bananas and plantains could not usefully be assigned Linnean binomials, but were better given cultivar names.

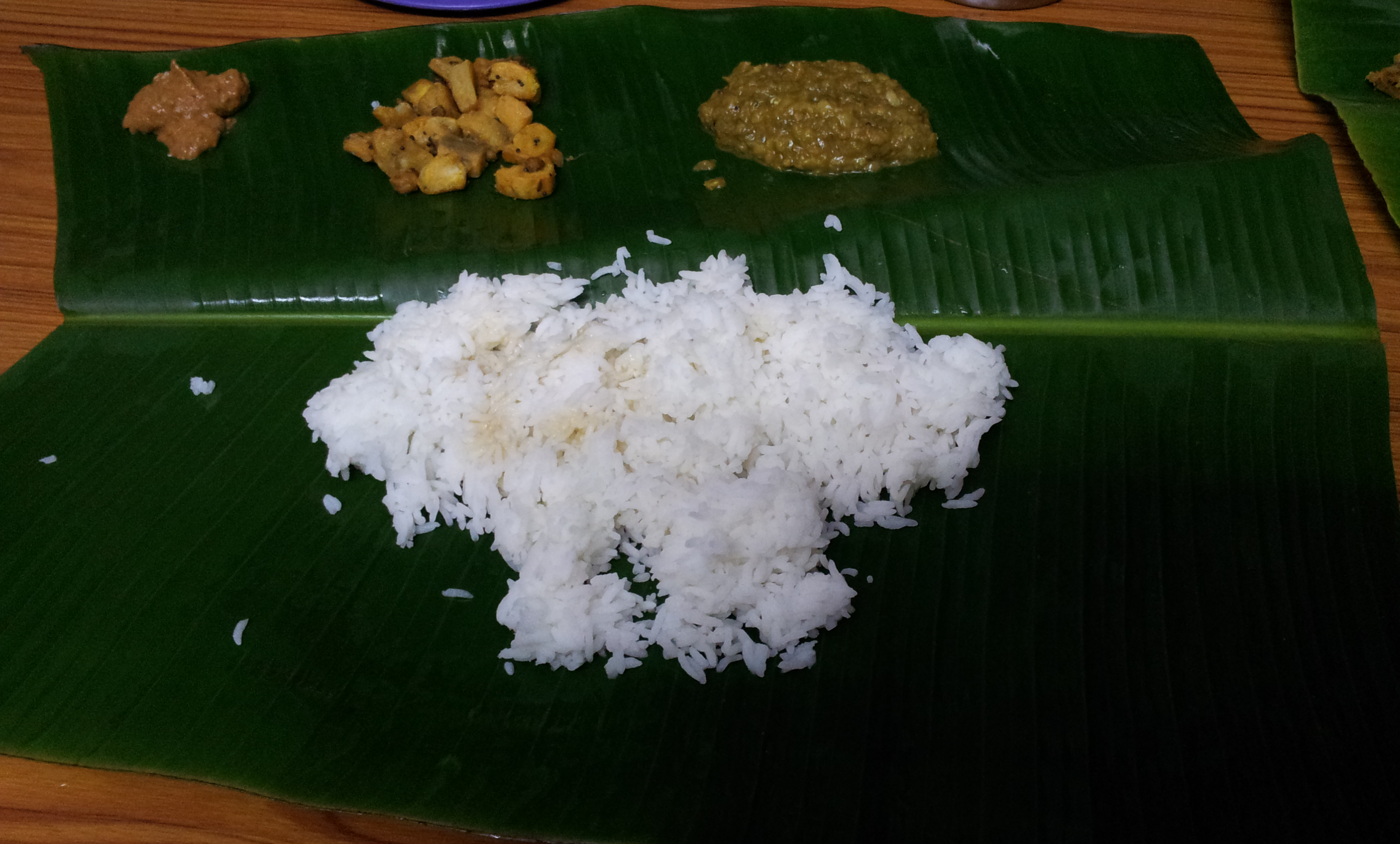
Serving food on a banana leaf is a popular tradition in certain parts of India, Sri Lanka, and parts of Southeast Asia.

As for the word banana, it came to English from Spanish and Portuguese, which had apparently obtained it from a West African language, possibly Wolof (Senegal). The Wolof form might itself be a loanword from Arabic banān mawz (<banān 'finger').

=== Sections ===
Musa sections have a history dating back to 1887, when M.P. Sagot published "Sur le genre Bananier", where the genus Musa was first formally classified. In this article, Sagot arranged the Musa species into three groups, although no section names were assigned to them. The grouping was based on morphological traits, establishing the trio as bananas with fleshy fruit, ornamental bananas with upright inflorescences and bracts that were vibrantly colored, and bananas that were giant in size.

Five years after Sagot's article, J.G. Baker made the first formal designation of Musa sections. To do so, he named three subgenera that almost paralleled the sections that had been described by Sagot. These sections were:

- M. subg. Physocaulis Baker – defined by a bract with many flowers, inedible fruits, and a bottle-shaped stem
- M. subg. Rhodochlamys Baker – defined by brightly colored bracts with few flowers, usually inedible fruits, and cylindrical stems
- M. subg. Eumusa Baker – defined by green, brown, or dull-violet bracts with many flowers, usually edible fruits, and cylindrical stems.

After this classification, in 1947, Cheeseman reclassified the taxa based on morphological features and chromosome number. This project proposed four sections:

- M. sect. Eumusa Cheesman (2n = 2x = 22)
- M. sect. Rhodochlamys (Baker) Cheesman (2n = 2x = 22)
- M. sect. Australimusa Cheesman (2n = 2x = 20)
- M. sect. Callimusa Cheesman (2n = 2x = 20)

The addition of another Musa section came in 1976 by G.C.G. Ardent. The added section, M. sect. Ingentimusa, Ardent was based on a single species, Musa ingens. This designation put the number of sections in Musa at five: Eumusa, Rhodochlamys, Callimusa, Australimusa, and Ingentimusa.

In the 21st century, genomics have become cheaper, more efficient, and more accurate, and Musa genetic research has increased exponentially. Research was conducted around a diversity of genomic markers (cpDNA, nrDNA, rDNA, introns, various spacers, etc.). The results of many of these studies suggested that the five sections of Musa defined by morphology (and listed above) were not monophyletic.

Based on the incorrect section grouping, Markku Häkkinen proposed another reclassification of the Musa sections in 2013. Using a multitude of genetic evidence and markers from other studies, Häkkinen suggested the reduction of five Musa sections into two: Musa and Callimusa. Unlike sectional classifications of the past, this hypothesis was based on genetic markers rather than morphological features or chromosome number. The two groups were generally formed by the clustering of the previously defined groups:

- Musa sect. Rhotochlamys and M. sect. Eumusa became M. sect. Musa
- M. sect. Ingetimusa, M. sect. Callimusa and M. sect. Australimusa became M. sect. Callimusa

The advance of genomic analysis technologies and further data on the relatedness of Musa species, formulated Häkkinen's two sections and later corroborated them as correct subcategories for the genus. The history of Musa sections provides an example of genomics superseding morphological evidence and thus classifications.

=== Species ===
The World Checklist of Selected Plant Families accepts 68 species and two primary hybrids, as of January 2013, which are listed below. The assignment to sections is based on GRIN (where this gives the species), regrouped according to Wong et al.

==== Section Callimusa (incorporating Australimusa) ====
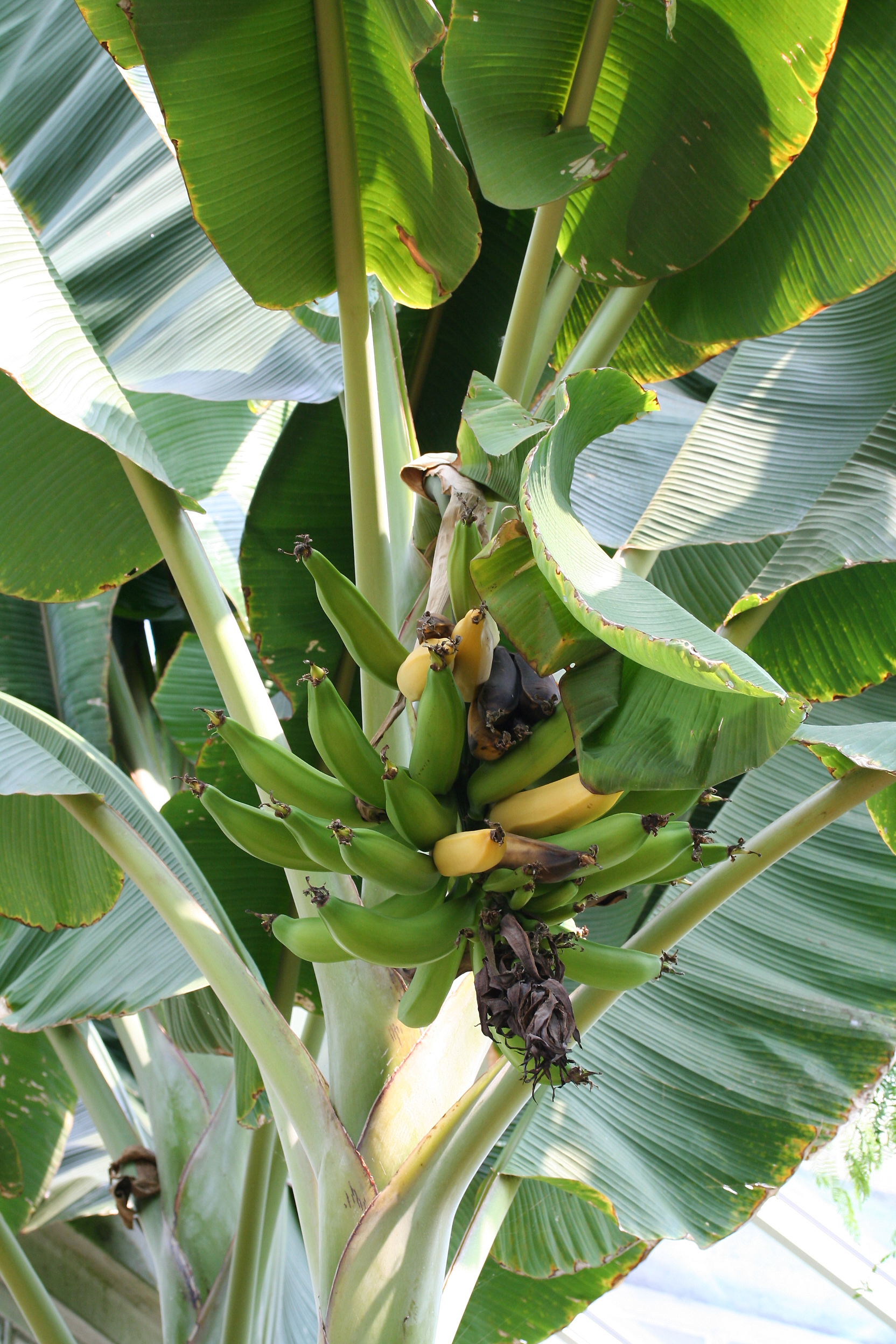
Fruit stalk of Musa sp.

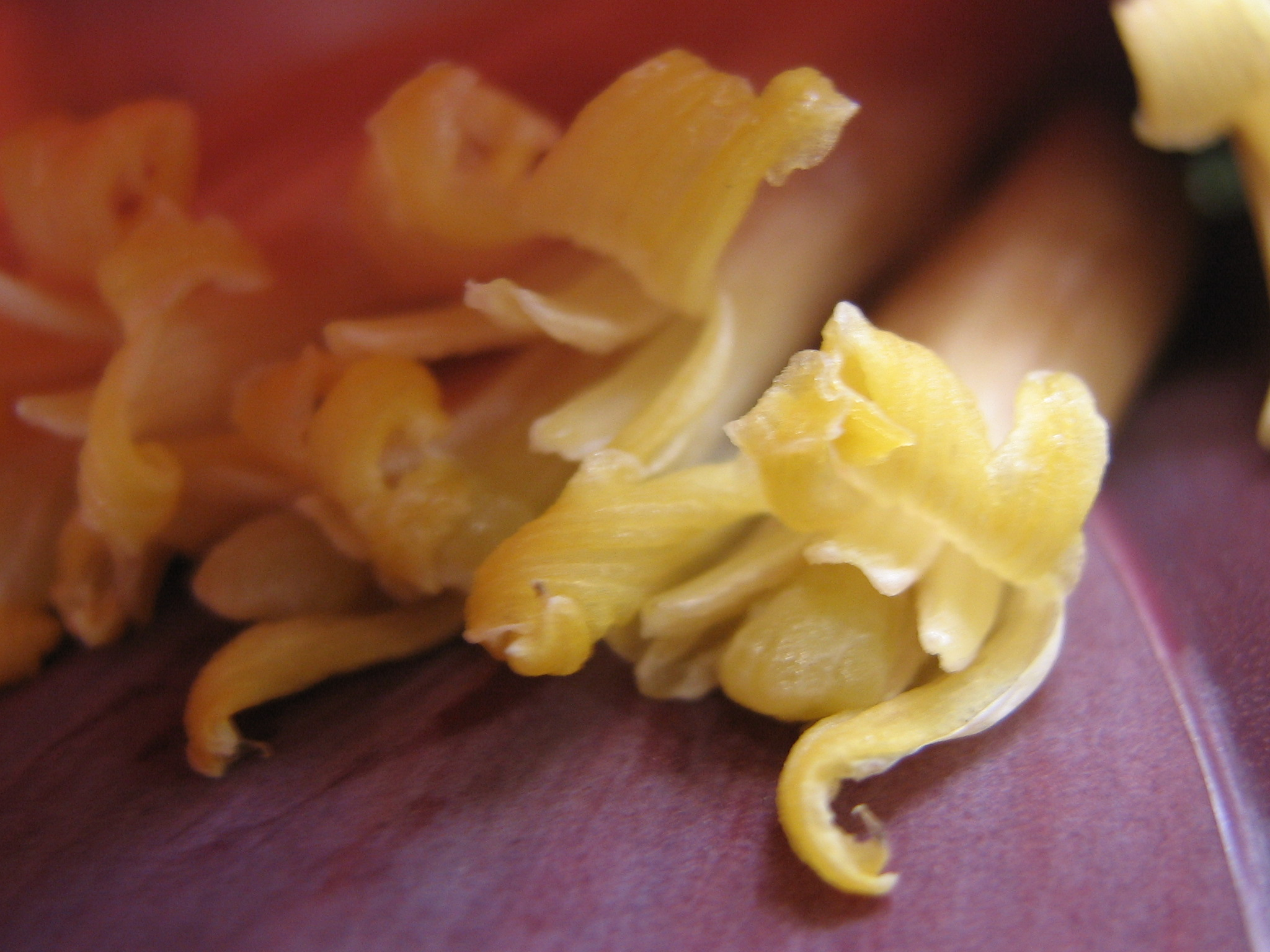
Banana flowers

[A] and [C] indicate known placement in the former sections Australimusa and Callimusa, respectively.

- M. × alinsanaya R.V.Valmayor [A]
- M. azizii Häkkinen
- M. barioensis Häkkinen
- M. bauensis Häkkinen & Meekiong [C]
- M. beccarii N.W.Simmonds [A] (Note: Musa beccarii is reported as having a haploid chromosome number of 9 or 10, the latter due to multivalent formation during meiosis. Although genetically it nestles comfortably within section Callimusa the chromosome number needs clarification.)
- M. boman Argent [A]
- M. borneensis Becc. [C]
- M. bukensis Argent [A]
- M. campestris Becc. [C]
- M. coccinea Andrews [C] – scarlet banana
- M. exotica R.V.Valmayor [C]
- M. fitzalanii F.Muell. [A] – extinct
- M. gracilis Holttum [C]
- M. hirta Becc. [A]
- M. insularimontana Hayata [A]
- M. jackeyi W.Hill [A]
- M. johnsii Argent [A]
- M. juwiniana Meekiong, Ipor & Tawan [C]
- M. lawitiensis Nasution & Supard. [C]
- M. lokok Geri & Ng
- M. lolodensis Cheesman [A]
- M. maclayi F.Muell. ex Mikl.-Maclay [A]
- M. monticola M.Hotta ex Argent [A]
- M. muluensis M.Hotta [A]
- M. paracoccinea A.Z.Liu & D.Z.Li [C]
- M. peekelii Lauterb. [A]
- M. salaccensis Zoll. ex Backer [A]
- M. textilis Née [A] – abacá
- M. × troglodytarum L. [A] – the cultivated Fe'i bananas
- M. tuberculata M.Hotta [A]
  - M. violascens Ridl. [C]
- M. viridis R.V.Valmayor et al.
- M. voonii Häkkinen

==== Section Ingentimusa ====
- M. ingens N.W.Simmonds

==== Section Musa (incorporating Rhodochlamys) ====
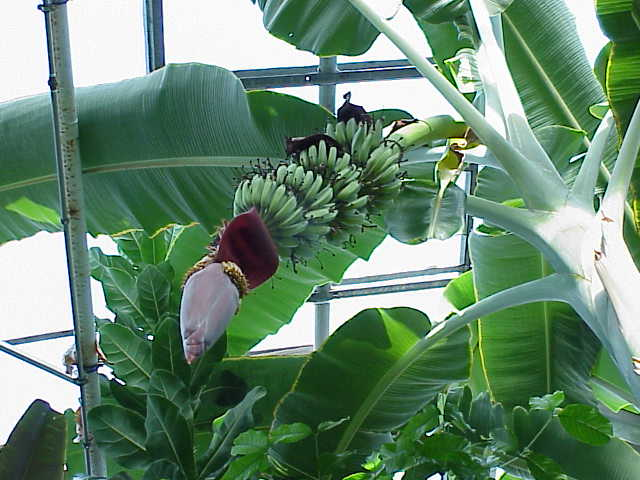
Musa acuminata with inflorescence

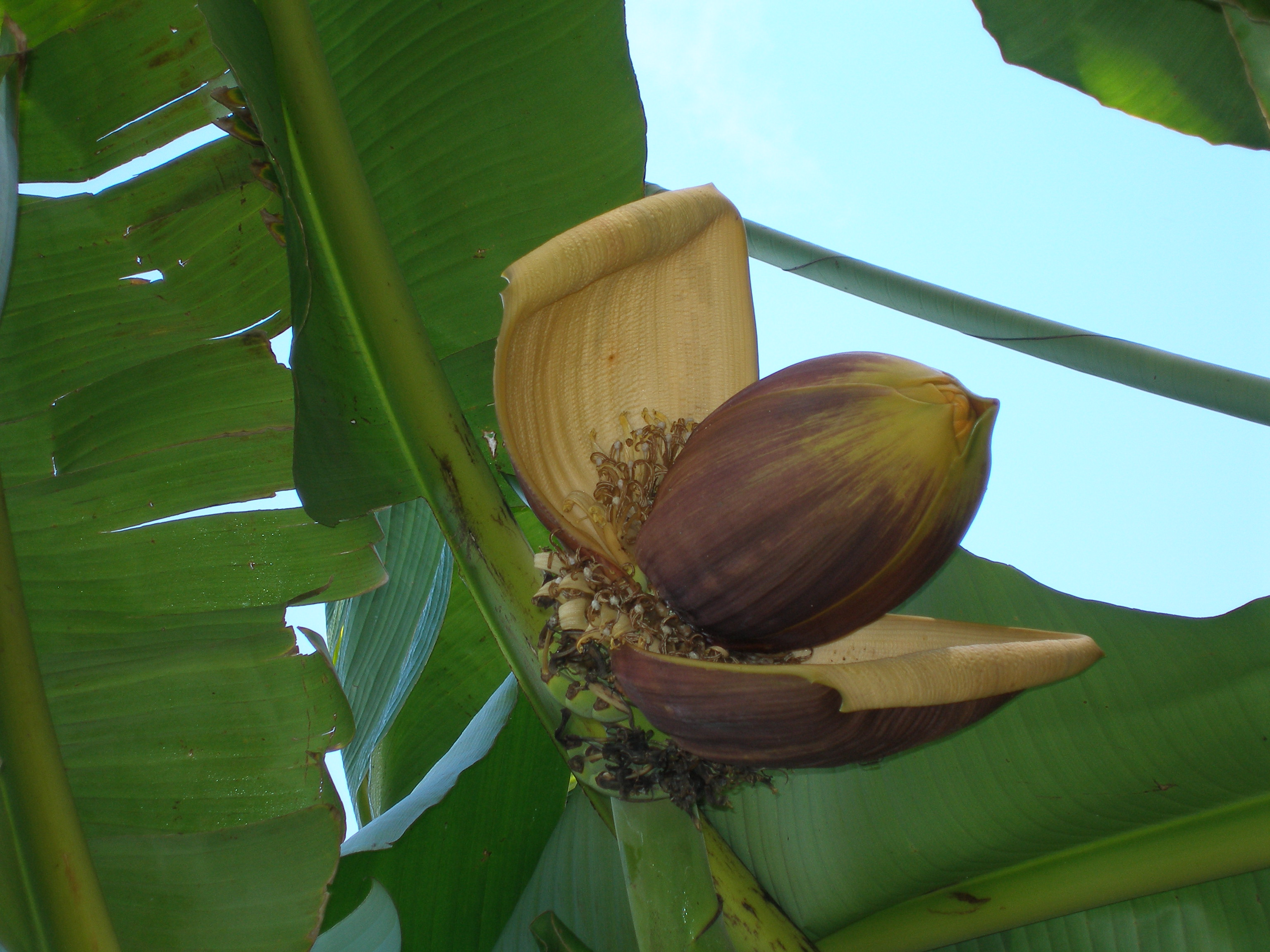
Japanese fiber banana (Musa basjoo) flowering at Cotswold Wildlife Park

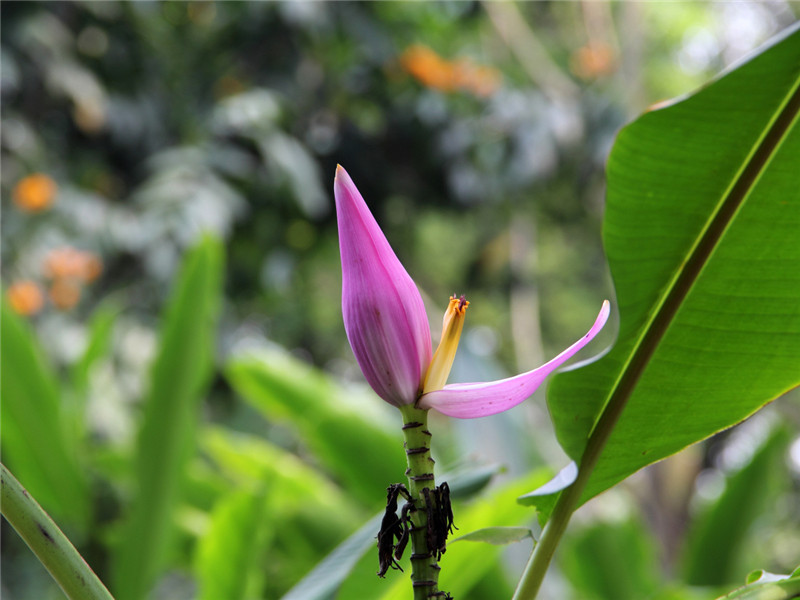
Musa ornata 'Roxburgh' in China

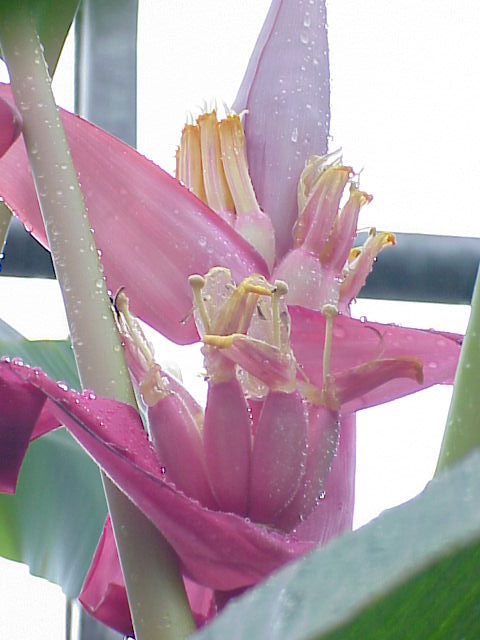
Pink banana (Musa velutina) flower

- M. acuminata Colla – wild seeded banana, one of the two main ancestors of modern edible banana cultivars
  - M. acuminata subsp. zebrina [= M. sumatrana] – blood banana
- M. aurantiaca G.Mann ex Baker
- M. balbisiana Colla – wild seeded banana, one of the two main ancestors of modern edible banana cultivars
- M. banksii F.Muell.
- M. basjoo Siebold & Zucc. ex Iinuma – Japanese fiber banana, hardy banana (Note: Musa basjoo is the most cold hardy species of Musa, growing and fruiting successfully in outdoor cultivation in the British Isles and British Columbia.)
- M. cheesmanii N.W.Simmonds
- M. chunii Häkkinen
- M. griersonii Noltie
- M. itinerans Cheesman
- M. mannii H.Wendl. ex Baker
- M. nagensium Prain
- M. ochracea K.Sheph.
- M. ornata Roxb.
- Musa × paradisiaca L. = M. acuminata × M. balbisiana – many of the cultivated edible bananas
- M. rosea Baker
- M. rubinea Häkkinen & C.H.Teo
- M. rubra Wall. ex Kurz (syn. Musa laterita Cheesman)
- M. sanguinea Hook.f.
- M. schizocarpa N.W.Simmonds
- M. siamensis Häkkinen & Rich.H.Wallace
- M. sikkimensis Kurz
- M. thomsonii (King ex Baker) A.M.Cowan & Cowan
- M. velutina H.Wendl. & Drude – pink banana
- M. yunnanensis Häkkinen & H.Wang – Yunnan banana, wild forest banana
- M. zaifui Häkkinen & H.Wang

==== Section undetermined or unknown ====
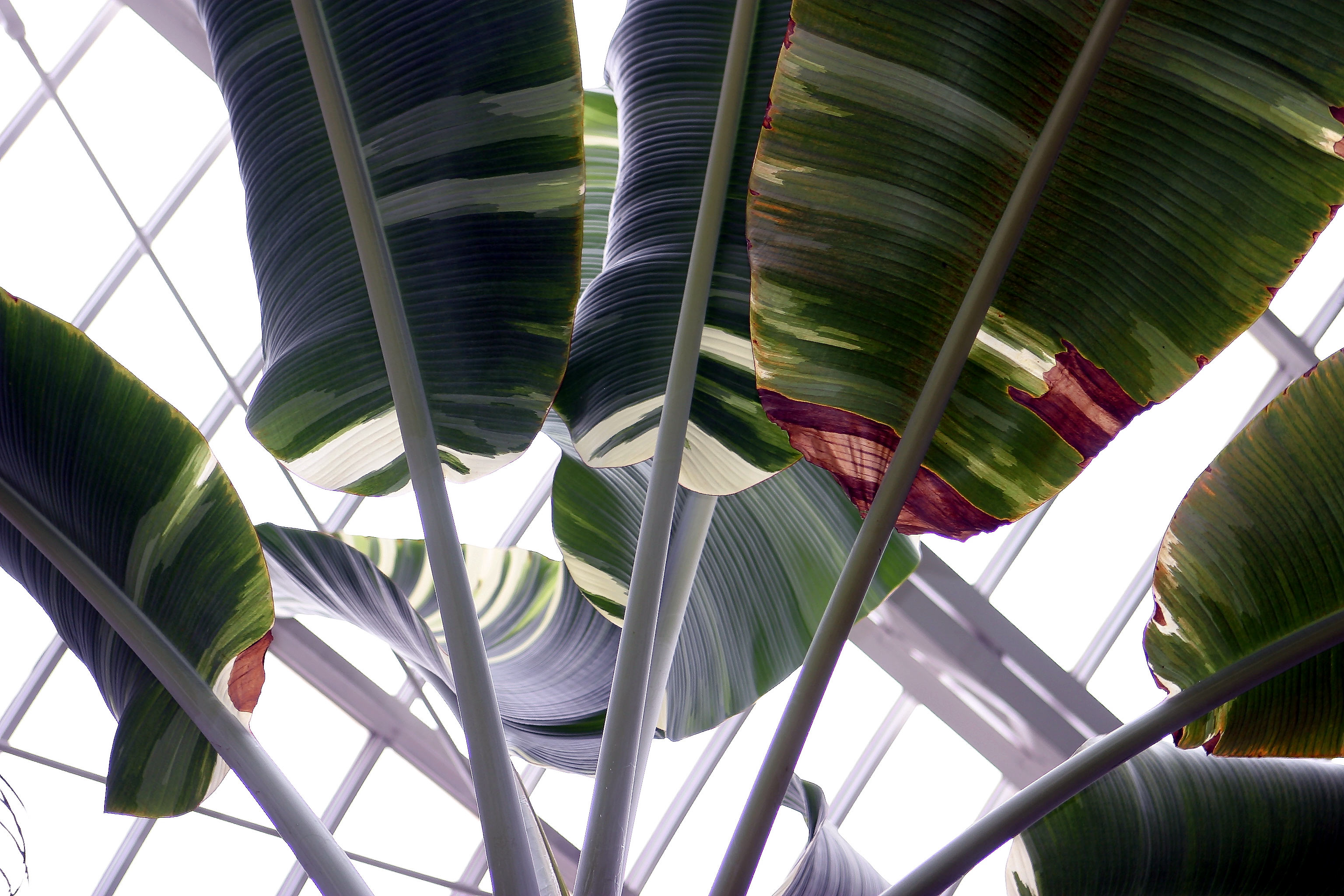
Varigated form of Musa sp.

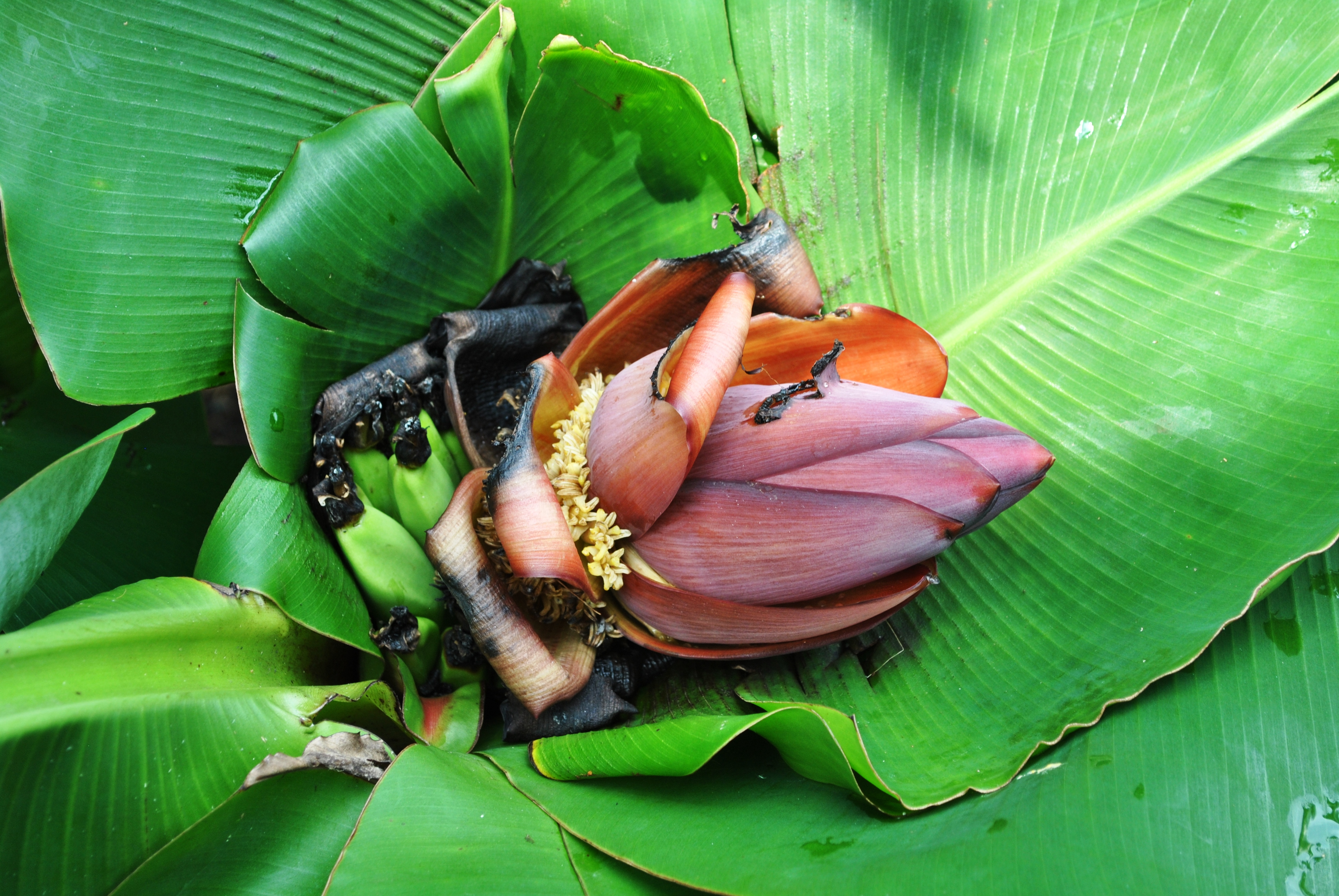
Musa sp.

- M. arfakiana Argent
- M. arunachalensis A.Joe, Sreejith & M.Sabu
- M. celebica Warb. ex K.Schum.
- M. kattuvazhana K.C.Jacob
- M. lanceolata Warb. ex K.Schum.
- M. lutea R.V.Valmayor et al.
- M. mekongensis J.T.Julian & D.T.David
- M. sakaiana Meekiong et al.
- M. splendida A.Chev.
- M. tonkinensis R.V.Valmayor et al.
- M. yamiensis C.L.Yeh & J.H.Chen

==== Fossil species ====
- †M. cardiosperma R.K. Jain

==== Formerly placed here ====
- Ensete davyae (Stapf) Cheesman (as M. davyae Stapf)
- Ensete gilletii (De Wild.) Cheesman (as M. gilletii De Wild. or M. martretiana A.Chev.)
- Ensete glaucum (Roxb.) Cheesman (as M. glauca Roxb.)
- Ensete lasiocarpum (Franch.) Cheesman (as M. lasiocarpa Franch.) – also placed in a separate genus as Musella lasiocarpa (Franch.) C.Y.Wu ex H.W.Li
- Ensete livingstoniana (J. Kirk) Cheesman (as M. livingstoniana J.Kirk)
- Ensete perrieri (Stapf) Cheesman (as M. perrieri Claverie)
- Ensete superbum (Roxb.) Cheesman (as M. superba Roxb.)
- Ensete ventricosum (Welw.) Cheesman (as M. arnoldiana De Wild., M. ensete J.F.Gmel. or M. ventricosum (Welw.) Cheesman)
- Heliconia bihai (L.) L. (as M. bihai L.)

== Distribution and habitat ==
The native distribution of the genus Musa includes most of the Indomalayan realm and parts of north-eastern Australasia. It has been introduced to many other parts of the world with tropical or subtropical climates.

== Ecology ==
Musa species are used as food plants by the larvae of some Lepidoptera species, including the giant leopard moth and other Hypercompe species, including H. albescens (only recorded on Musa), H. eridanus, and H. icasia.

== Cultivated bananas ==
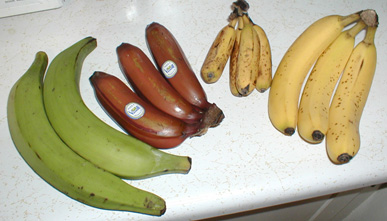
Left to right: plantains, red bananas, latundan, and Cavendish bananas

A number of distinct groups of plants bearing edible fruit have been developed from species of Musa. In English, fruits which are sweet and used for dessert are usually called "bananas", whereas starchier varieties used for cooking are called "plantains", but these terms do not have any botanical significance. By far the largest and now the most widely distributed group of cultivated bananas is derived from section Musa, particularly M. acuminata and M. balbisiana, either alone or in various hybrid combinations. The next but much smaller group is derived from members of section Callimusa (previously classified as Australimusa) and is restricted in importance to Polynesia. Of even more restricted importance are small groups of hybrids from Papua New Guinea; a group from section Musa to which M. schizocarpa has also contributed, and a group of hybrids between section Musa and section Callimusa.

Banana and plantains are the fourth most produced food globally surpassed only by the staple crops of rice, wheat and maize.

=== Properties ===
Plants of the Musa spp. including roots, flowers and fruits have been used in the folk medicine cultures of Africa, Asia, India and the Americas. Modern studies examining the properties of the fruits have found diversity of bioactive compounds among genotypes compared with commercially grown cultivars.

=== Section Musa cultivars ===
When the Linnaean binomial system was abandoned for cultivated bananas, an alternate genome-based system for the nomenclature of edible bananas in section Musa was devised. Thus, the plant previously known by the "species" name Musa cavendishii became Musa (AAA Group) 'Dwarf Cavendish'. The "new" name shows clearly that 'Dwarf Cavendish' is a triploid, with three sets of chromosomes, all derived from Musa acuminata, which is designated by the letter "A". When Musa balbisiana is involved, the letter "B" is used to denote its genome. Thus, the cultivar 'Rajapuri' may be called Musa (AAB Group) 'Rajapuri'. 'Rajapuri' is also a triploid, expected to have two sets of chromosomes from Musa acuminata and one from Musa balbisiana. In the genome of edible bananas from section Musa, combinations such as AA, BB, ABB, BBB and even AAAB can be found.

=== Fe'i-type cultivars ===
No such nomenclature system has been developed for the group of edible bananas derived from section Callimusa. This group is known generally as the "Fe'i" or "Fehi" bananas, and numerous cultivars are found in the South Pacific region. They are very distinctive plants with upright fruit bunches, featuring in three of Paul Gauguin's paintings. The flesh can be cooked before eating and is bright orange, with a high level of beta carotene. Fe'i bananas are no longer very important for food, as imported foods have grown in popularity, although some have ritual significance. Investigations are under way to use the Fe'i karat bananas (the name derives from "carrot" due to the intense orange-yellow color of the fruit) in prevention of childhood blindness in Pohnpei. Fe'i bananas probably derive mainly from Musa maclayi, although their origins are not as well understood as the section Musa bananas. Cultivars can be formally named, as e.g. Musa (Fe'i Group) 'Utafun'.

== Other uses ==
In addition to the edible fruits, the flowers can be eaten cooked, and the heart of the plant (like heart of palm) can be eaten raw or cooked. Additionally, the rootstocks and leaf sheaths of some species can be cooked and eaten. The leaves are used in several cultures as cooking wrappers, such as for Puerto Rican pasteles or Indonesian pepes, and for food plating. Musa textilis (abacá) is grown for fiber.

== See also ==
- Ensete – false bananas
- Musella lasiocarpa
- True plantains
