= Musa maclayi =

Conservation status
- Least Concern (IUCN 3.1)

Scientific classification
- Kingdom: Plantae
- Clade: Embryophytes
- Clade: Tracheophytes
- Clade: Spermatophytes
- Clade: Angiosperms
- Clade: Monocots
- Clade: Commelinids
- Order: Zingiberales
- Family: Musaceae
- Genus: Musa
- Section: Musa sect. Callimusa
- Species: M. maclayi

Binomial name
- Musa maclayi F.Muell. ex Mikl.-Maclay

Species of flowering plant

Musa maclayi is a species of seeded banana native to Papua New Guinea and the Solomon Islands. It is placed in section Callimusa (now including the former section Australimusa). It is regarded as one of the progenitors of the Fe'i banana cultivars.

The plant has red sap and an upright flowering and fruiting stem. The fruits are rounded and arranged closely together in bunches – partly joined along their edges in some varieties.

The species was named after the explorer and naturalist Nicholas Miklouho-Maclay, who first described it:

"Besides the cultivated varieties, which have been obtained by exchange between the villages, there is to be found in the forest a wild Banana (Musa Maclayi F. v. M. [Ferdinand von Mueller]), compared to the cultivated varieties, with a tall stem (nearly twice as tall), with narrow stiff leaves and small (not edible) fruits full of seeds."

— N. Miklouho-Maclay

== Subspecies ==
Two subspecies and two varieties are known:

- Musa maclayi subsp. ailuluai Argent
- Musa maclayi subsp. maclayi (autonym)
- Musa maclayi var. erecta (Simmonds) Argent
- Musa maclayi var. namatani Argent
