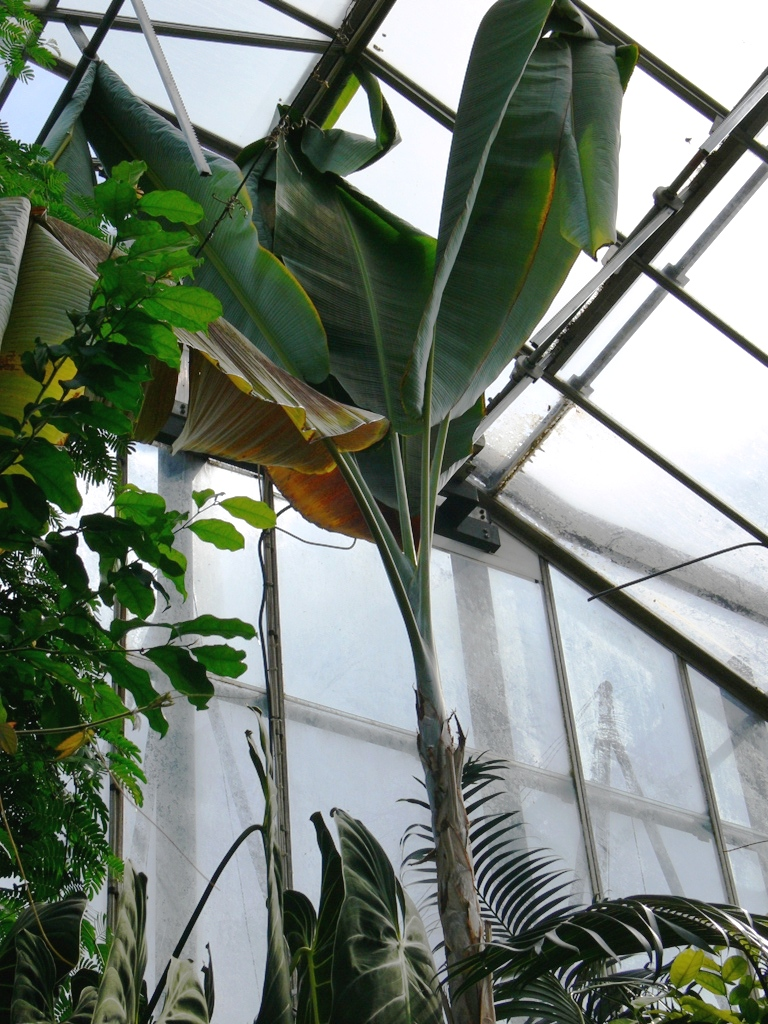
- Musa nagensium from the Greenhouse at RBGE, Edinburgh

Scientific classification
- Kingdom: Plantae
- Clade: Embryophytes
- Clade: Tracheophytes
- Clade: Spermatophytes
- Clade: Angiosperms
- Clade: Monocots
- Clade: Commelinids
- Order: Zingiberales
- Family: Musaceae
- Genus: Musa
- Section: Musa sect. Musa
- Species: M. nagensium

Binomial name
- Musa nagensium Prain (1904)

= Musa nagensium =

Species of flowering plant

Musa nagensium is a species of the genus Musa, found in the Eastern Himalayas in Asia. The native range extends from India (Arunachal Pradesh, Nagaland and Assam) through Myanmar, into western portions of Yunnan province in China, typically growing in humid, forested ravines at elevations between 400 and 1100m.
