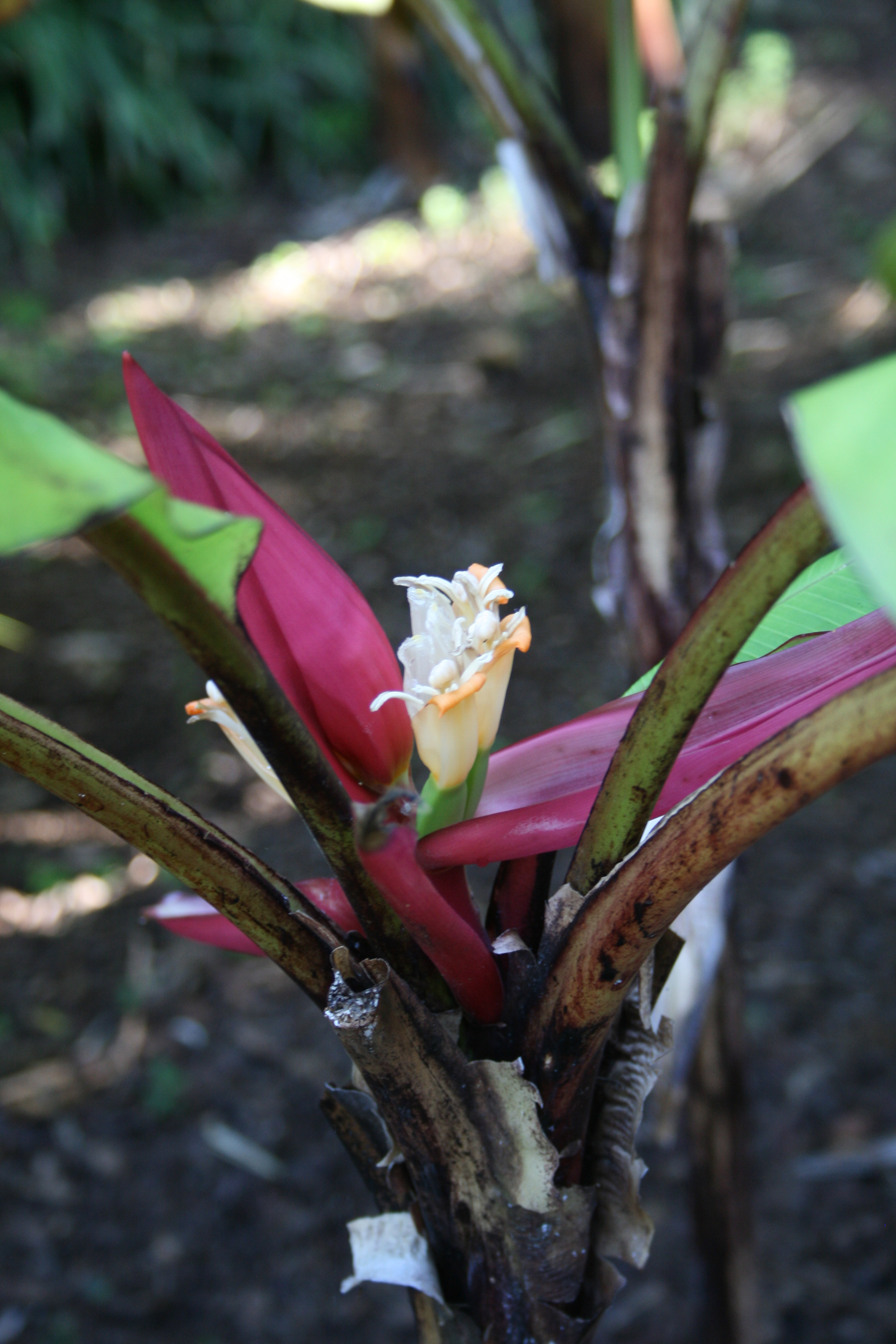
- Flower

Conservation status
- Critically Endangered (IUCN 3.1)

Scientific classification
- Kingdom: Plantae
- Clade: Embryophytes
- Clade: Tracheophytes
- Clade: Spermatophytes
- Clade: Angiosperms
- Clade: Monocots
- Clade: Commelinids
- Order: Zingiberales
- Family: Musaceae
- Genus: Musa
- Section: Musa sect. Musa
- Species: M. mannii

Binomial name
- Musa mannii H.Wendl. ex Baker

= Musa mannii =

Species of flowering plant

Musa mannii is a species of plant in the family Musaceae endemic to Arunachal Pradesh, India.

== Taxonomy ==
It was described by John Gilbert Baker in 1892 based on previous work by Hermann Wendland. It is placed in the section Musa sect. Musa.

== Conservation ==
It is categorised as Critically Endangered (CR). It is cultivated in numerous ex-situ collections in botanic gardens.
