= Musa lawitiensis =

Conservation status
- Least Concern (IUCN 3.1)

Scientific classification
- Kingdom: Plantae
- Clade: Embryophytes
- Clade: Tracheophytes
- Clade: Spermatophytes
- Clade: Angiosperms
- Clade: Monocots
- Clade: Commelinids
- Order: Zingiberales
- Family: Musaceae
- Genus: Musa
- Section: Musa sect. Callimusa
- Species: M. lawitiensis

Binomial name
- Musa lawitiensis Nasution & Supard.

Species of flowering plant

Musa lawitiensis is a species of wild banana (genus Musa), native to the island of Borneo (both the Indonesian and Malaysian portions). It is placed in section Callimusa (now including the former section Australimusa), having a diploid chromosome number of 2n = 20.
