= Musa thomsonii =

Conservation status
- Least Concern (IUCN 3.1)

Scientific classification
- Kingdom: Plantae
- Clade: Embryophytes
- Clade: Tracheophytes
- Clade: Spermatophytes
- Clade: Angiosperms
- Clade: Monocots
- Clade: Commelinids
- Order: Zingiberales
- Family: Musaceae
- Genus: Musa
- Section: Musa sect. Musa
- Species: M. thomsonii

Binomial name
- Musa thomsonii (King) A.M.Cowan & Cowan

Synonyms
- Musa × paradisiaca var. thomsonii (King) K.Schum.; Musa × sapientum f. thomsonii King

Species of flowering plant

Musa thomsonii is a species of wild banana in the family Musaceae.
