= Musa arunachalensis =

Conservation status
- Critically Endangered (IUCN 3.1)

Scientific classification
- Kingdom: Plantae
- Clade: Embryophytes
- Clade: Tracheophytes
- Clade: Spermatophytes
- Clade: Angiosperms
- Clade: Monocots
- Clade: Commelinids
- Order: Zingiberales
- Family: Musaceae
- Genus: Musa
- Species: M. arunachalensis

Binomial name
- Musa arunachalensis A.Joe, Sreejith & M.Sabu

Species of flowering plant

Musa arunachalensis is a species in the genus Musa. It is an herbaceous tree native to the Indian state of Arunachal Pradesh in the eastern Himalayas. It was first described in 2013 by botanists from the University of Calicut in Kerala.
