= Musa chunii =

Conservation status
- Endangered (IUCN 3.1)

Scientific classification
- Kingdom: Plantae
- Clade: Embryophytes
- Clade: Tracheophytes
- Clade: Spermatophytes
- Clade: Angiosperms
- Clade: Monocots
- Clade: Commelinids
- Order: Zingiberales
- Family: Musaceae
- Genus: Musa
- Section: Musa sect. Musa
- Species: M. chunii

Binomial name
- Musa chunii Häkkinen

Species of flowering plant

Musa chunii is a species of wild banana (genus Musa), native from Arunachal Pradesh to western Yunnan in China. It is placed in section Musa (now including the former section Rhodochlamys), having a diploid chromosome number of 2n = 20.
