= Musa rubinea =

Conservation status
- Critically Endangered (IUCN 3.1)

Scientific classification
- Kingdom: Plantae
- Clade: Tracheophytes
- Clade: Angiosperms
- Clade: Monocots
- Clade: Commelinids
- Order: Zingiberales
- Family: Musaceae
- Genus: Musa
- Section: Musa sect. Musa
- Species: M. rubinea

Binomial name
- Musa rubinea Häkkinen & C.H.Teo

Species of plant

Musa rubinea is a species of wild banana (genus Musa) native to western Yunnan, China.

== Conservation ==
Musa rubinea has been assessed as critically endangered on the IUCN Red List. The species has a low population, estimated at less than 250 individuals. Its known habitat, in a single area of western Yunnan, is threatened by conversion of land for agriculture and by logging. It is suspected that the species has been harvested for horticulture. The possible presence of the species in Arunachal Pradesh has not been confirmed.
