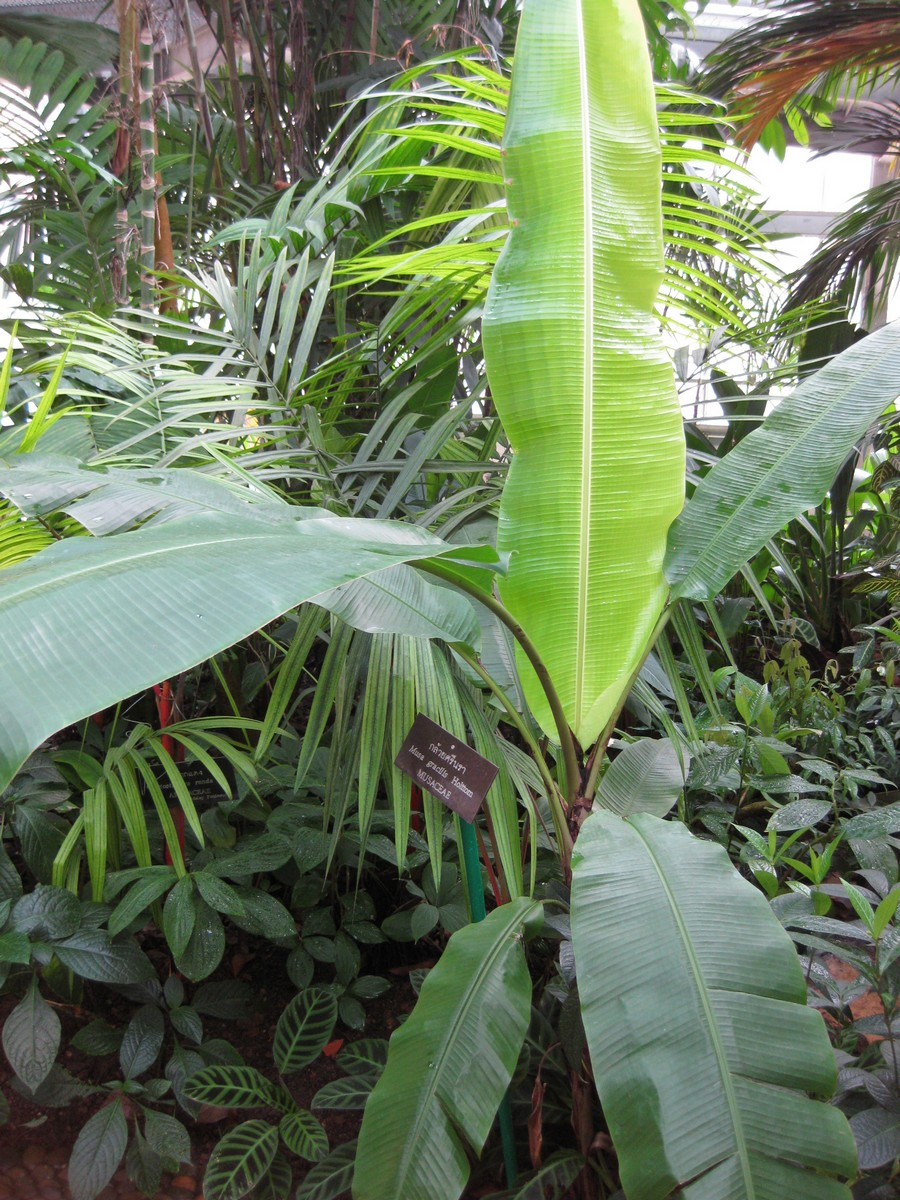
- At the Queen Sirikit Botanic Garden in Chiang Mai, Thailand

Conservation status
- Least Concern (IUCN 3.1)

Scientific classification
- Kingdom: Plantae
- Clade: Embryophytes
- Clade: Tracheophytes
- Clade: Spermatophytes
- Clade: Angiosperms
- Clade: Monocots
- Clade: Commelinids
- Order: Zingiberales
- Family: Musaceae
- Genus: Musa
- Section: Musa sect. Callimusa
- Species: M. gracilis

Binomial name
- Musa gracilis Holttum

= Musa gracilis =

Species of flowering plant

Musa gracilis is a species of wild banana (genus Musa), native to Peninsular Malaysia. It is placed in section Callimusa (now including the former section Australimusa), having a diploid chromosome number of 2n = 20. It grows to less than 2 m (7 ft) tall. It has an upright pink-purple bud and produces narrow fruits (bananas), which have magenta and green stripes.

== Gallery ==
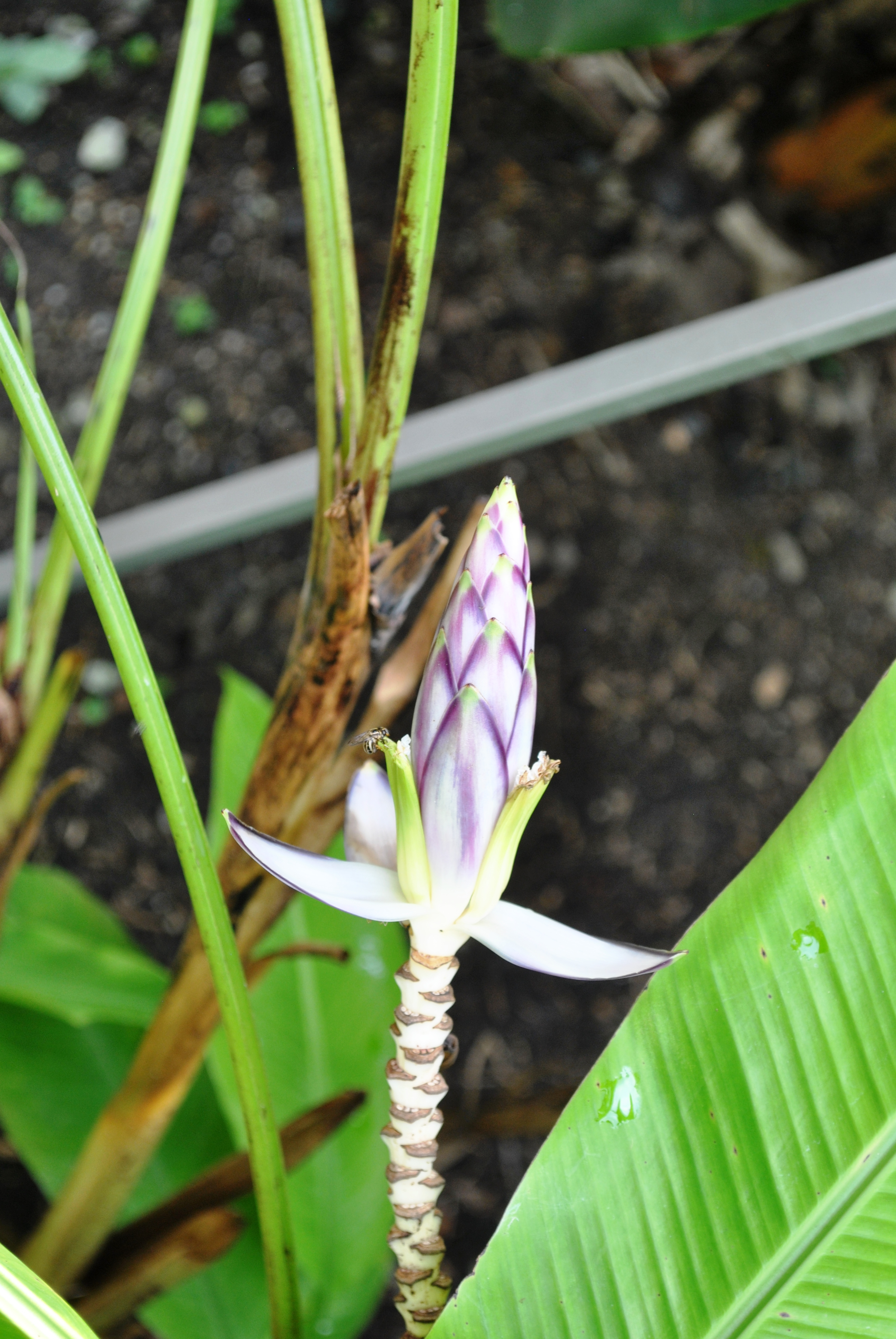
At the Singapore Botanic Gardens
