= Musa ochracea =

Conservation status
- Least Concern (IUCN 3.1)

Scientific classification
- Kingdom: Plantae
- Clade: Embryophytes
- Clade: Tracheophytes
- Clade: Spermatophytes
- Clade: Angiosperms
- Clade: Monocots
- Clade: Commelinids
- Order: Zingiberales
- Family: Musaceae
- Genus: Musa
- Section: Musa sect. Musa
- Species: M. ochracea

Binomial name
- Musa ochracea K.Sheph.

Species of flowering plant

Musa ochracea is a plant in the banana and plantain family native to tropical Asia (in India). The specific epithet, "ochracea", is a Latin word meaning "ochracaceous" (ochre-colored).
