= Musa siamensis =

Scientific classification
- Kingdom: Plantae
- Clade: Embryophytes
- Clade: Tracheophytes
- Clade: Spermatophytes
- Clade: Angiosperms
- Clade: Monocots
- Clade: Commelinids
- Order: Zingiberales
- Family: Musaceae
- Genus: Musa
- Section: Musa sect. Musa
- Species: M. siamensis

Binomial name
- Musa siamensis Häkkinen & Rich.H.Wallace

Species of flowering plant

Musa siamensis is an Asian tropical species of plant in the banana family native to Indo-China (Thailand).
