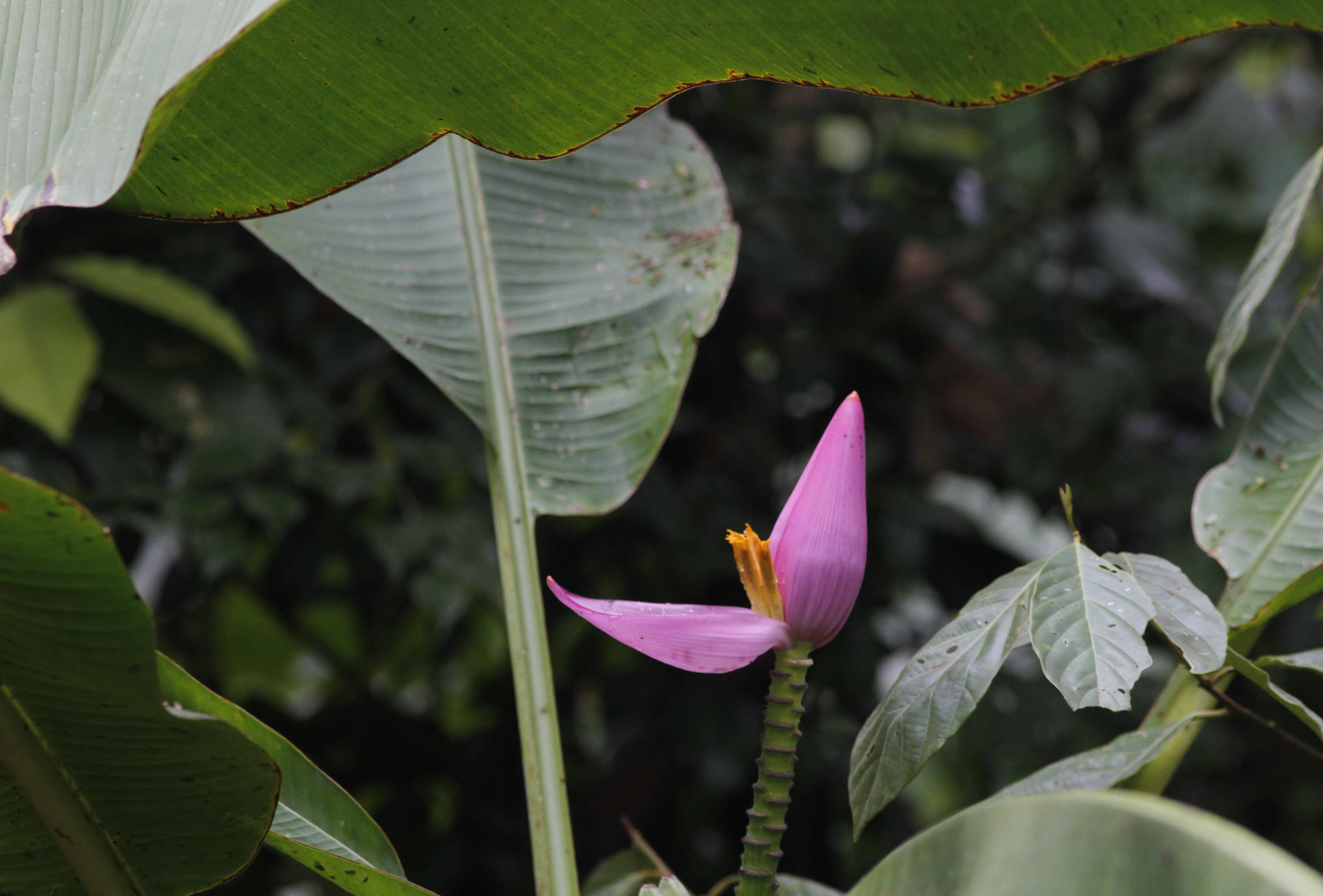
- Flower, Bangladesh

Conservation status
- Least Concern (IUCN 3.1)

Scientific classification
- Kingdom: Plantae
- Clade: Embryophytes
- Clade: Tracheophytes
- Clade: Spermatophytes
- Clade: Angiosperms
- Clade: Monocots
- Clade: Commelinids
- Order: Zingiberales
- Family: Musaceae
- Genus: Musa
- Section: Musa sect. Musa
- Species: M. ornata

Binomial name
- Musa ornata Roxb.

= Musa ornata =

Species of banana plant

Musa ornata, the flowering banana, is one of more than 50 species of banana in the genus Musa of the family Musaceae. Most of these species are large tropical evergreen perennials, mainly from lowland areas with high temperature and humidity. Musa ornata originated in southeast Asia, and is cultivated for its commercial and ornamental value. The fruit is attractive but tends to be inedible.

== Description ==
Musa ornata belongs to the Musa section Rhodochlamys. Rhodochlamys is one of the four sections into which the genus Musa is divided (the others being Australimusa, Callimusa and Eumusa, which is sometimes called Musa). As a member of Rhodochlamys, M. ornata has a basic chromosome number of 2n = 22 compared with 2n = 20 of the Australimusa and Callimusa. Plants of this section are known for their brightly colored bracts.

The true M. ornata is found in India and is a small species. From its home in India it reached Central and South America early in the 19th century where it became naturalized. M. ornata is not an especially variable plant in itself but it hybridizes freely with other species. The result is that there are a number of hybrids derived from it in the tropical regions of America.

Plants grow to a height of 5 to 10 ft (1.5 to 3.0 m). The plants have green foliage with pink tones throughout. The leaves can grow to be 6 ft (1.8 m) long, 14 inches (360 mm) wide and can be used for tropical cut flower arrangements. It produces pink flowers and small, dark pink or crimson fruit. The fruit type is a banana that is seeded and inedible.

Musa ornata has a yellow-orange inflorescence whose male and female flowers both tend to be 3-5 per bract in a single row, varying up to about 7 per cluster. The anthers of the male flowers are purple while the female style is green.

== Distribution ==
Musa ornata is native to south-east Asia and commonly found in Bangladesh, Burma, and India. This species is widely distributed throughout tropical regions but it is often misnamed. The plant is relatively tolerant and was found in Mauritius (off the coast of Madagascar) before 1805 and must have begun to travel several years before it was botanically described in 1824 on Indian banana plantations. Numerous parts of Mexico have also naturalized the plant, although the seedlings are often offered commercially under a different name (Musa violacea).

== Cultivation ==
Musa ornata is one of several banana species grown as ornamental plants for their handsome foliage, for instance in mixed tropical plantings. In temperate zones it must be protected from winter frosts, or grown under glass with heat - minimum temperature 7 °C (45 °F). It has gained the Royal Horticultural Society's Award of Garden Merit. It flowers readily and produces few but viable seeds.

== Other uses ==
The male bud may be cooked or used in salads, while the leaves are often incorporated in making dressings. The root of the plant is also sometimes used for ayurvedic preparations (alternative medicine) in northeast India. The ash of the pseudostem, the corm, the fruiting stalk and fruit peel are also used as an anti-scorbutic (to prevent scurvy), as well as for digestive help, or as a tonic.
