= Musa zaifui =

Conservation status
- Critically endangered, possibly extinct in the wild (IUCN 3.1)

Scientific classification
- Kingdom: Plantae
- Clade: Embryophytes
- Clade: Tracheophytes
- Clade: Spermatophytes
- Clade: Angiosperms
- Clade: Monocots
- Clade: Commelinids
- Order: Zingiberales
- Family: Musaceae
- Genus: Musa
- Section: Musa sect. Musa
- Species: M. zaifui

Binomial name
- Musa zaifui Häkkinen & H.Wang

Species of flowering plant

Musa zaifui is a species of plant in the banana family native to temperate China (Yunnan province).
