= Musa muluensis =

Scientific classification
- Kingdom: Plantae
- Clade: Embryophytes
- Clade: Tracheophytes
- Clade: Spermatophytes
- Clade: Angiosperms
- Clade: Monocots
- Clade: Commelinids
- Order: Zingiberales
- Family: Musaceae
- Genus: Musa
- Section: Musa sect. Callimusa
- Species: M. muluensis

Binomial name
- Musa muluensis M.Hotta

Species of flowering plant

Musa muluensis is a plant in the banana and plantain family. It is native to tropical Asia; found only in Sarawak in Malaysia. It is placed in section Callimusa (now including the former section Australimusa), members of which have a diploid chromosome number of 2n = 20.

== Collection history ==
In 1964, specimens of the leaves, fruits, and flowers of M. muluensis were first collected for botanical analysis. They were collected from somewhere along the Sungai Payau stream at the foot of Mount Mulu on the island of Borneo in Sarawak state, Malaysia, at an elevation between 50 and 100 meters. The collector was Mitsuru Hotta, the same botanist who later named it. The Latin name, translated to English means "banana (or plantain) species originating from (Mount) Mulu".
