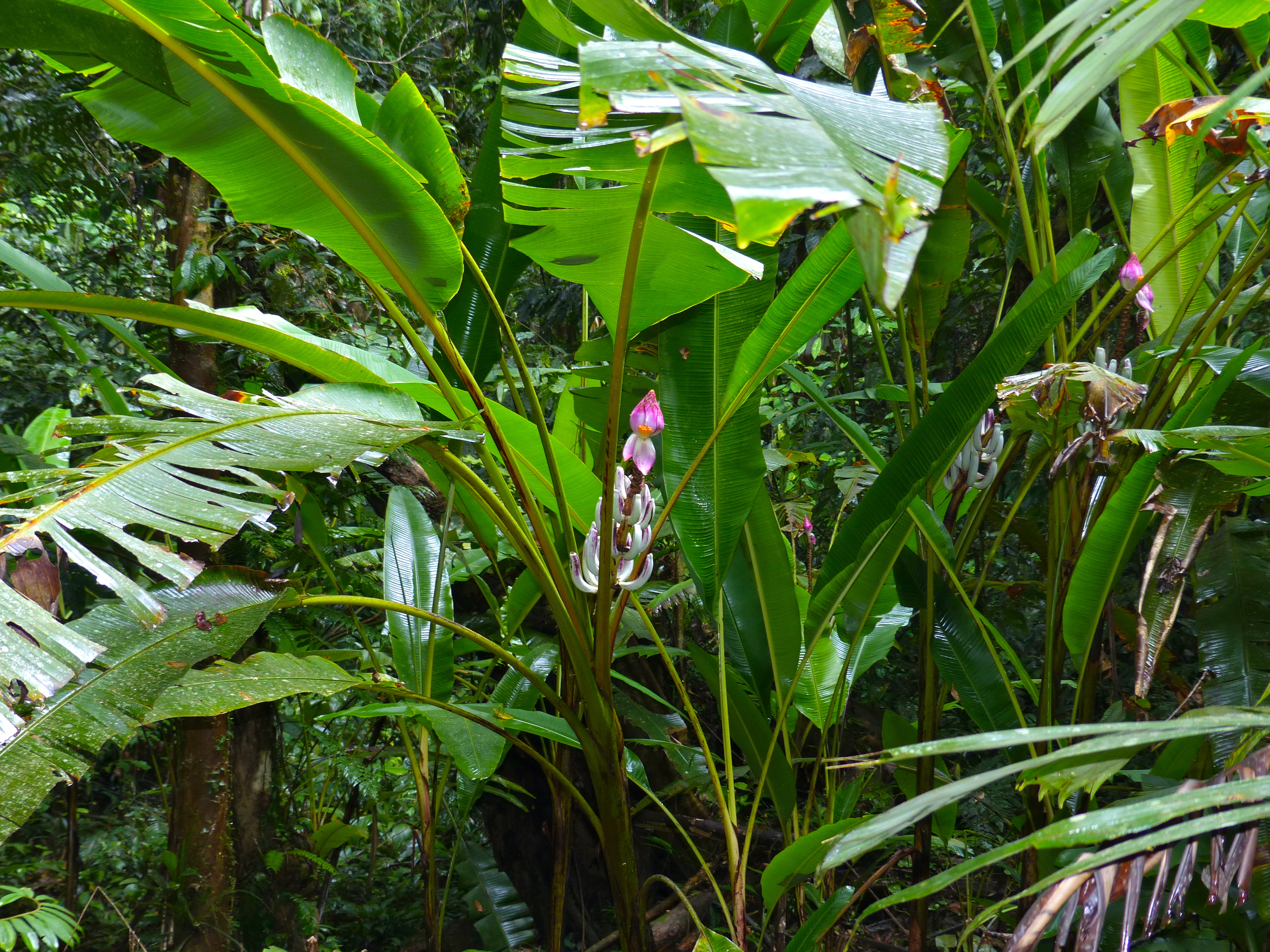

Conservation status
- Least Concern (IUCN 3.1)

Scientific classification
- Kingdom: Plantae
- Clade: Embryophytes
- Clade: Tracheophytes
- Clade: Spermatophytes
- Clade: Angiosperms
- Clade: Monocots
- Clade: Commelinids
- Order: Zingiberales
- Family: Musaceae
- Genus: Musa
- Section: Musa sect. Callimusa
- Species: M. campestris

Binomial name
- Musa campestris Becc.

= Musa campestris =

Species of flowering plant

Musa campestris is a species of wild banana (genus Musa), endemic to the island of Borneo. It is placed in section Callimusa (now including the former section Australimusa), having a diploid chromosome number of 2n = 20.

== Gallery ==
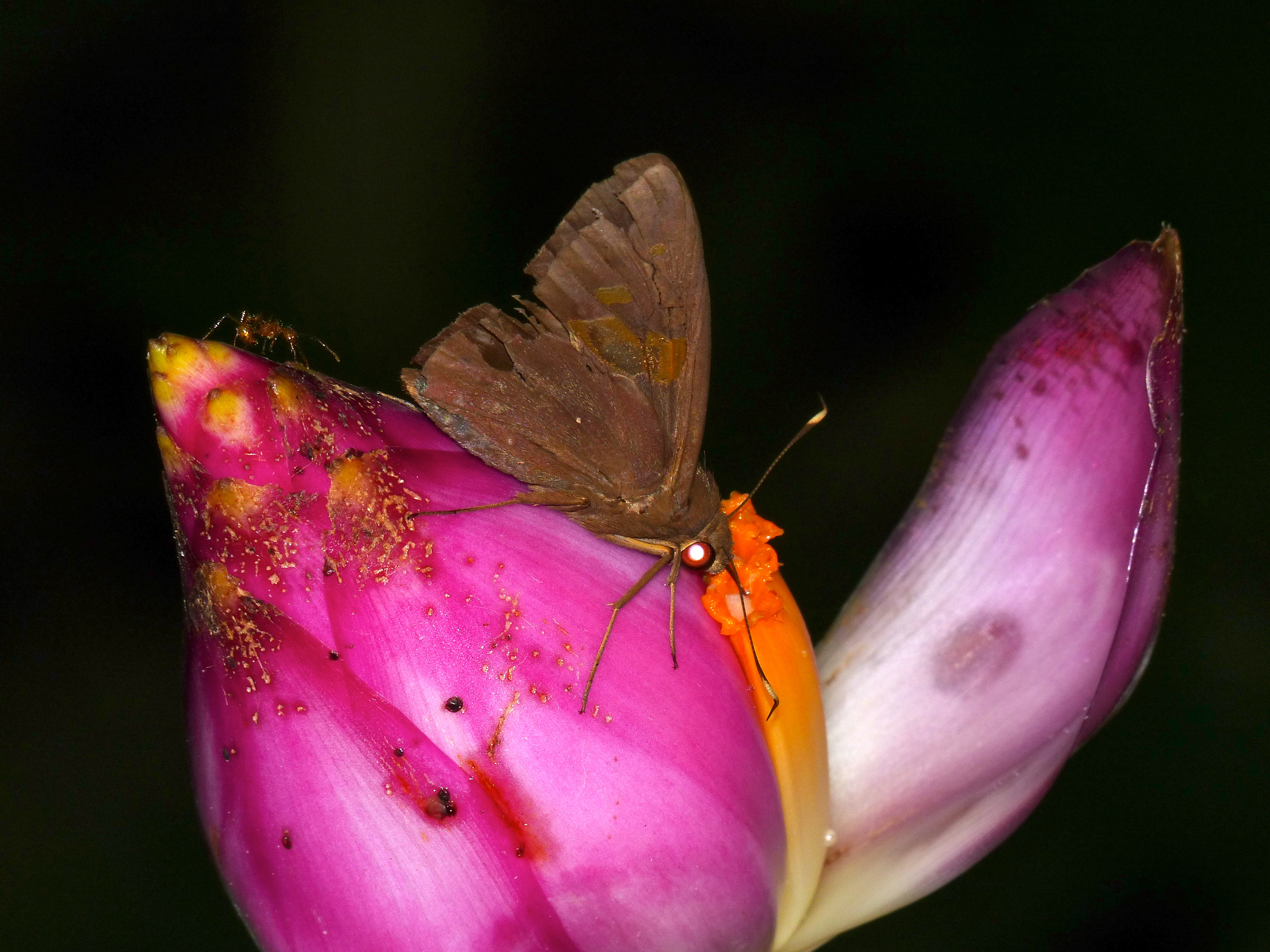
Banana skipper (Erionota thrax) on inflorescence

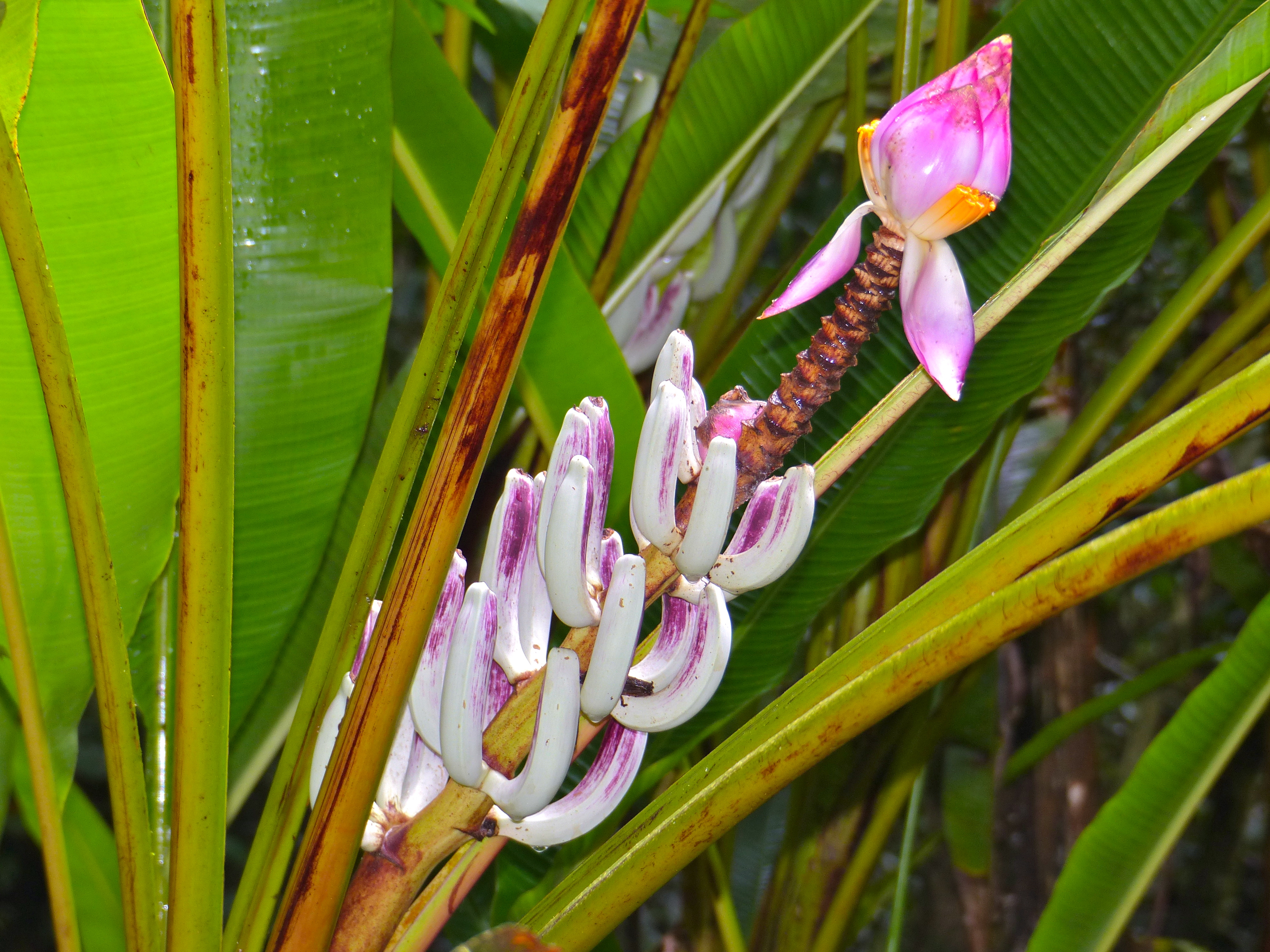
Inflorescence

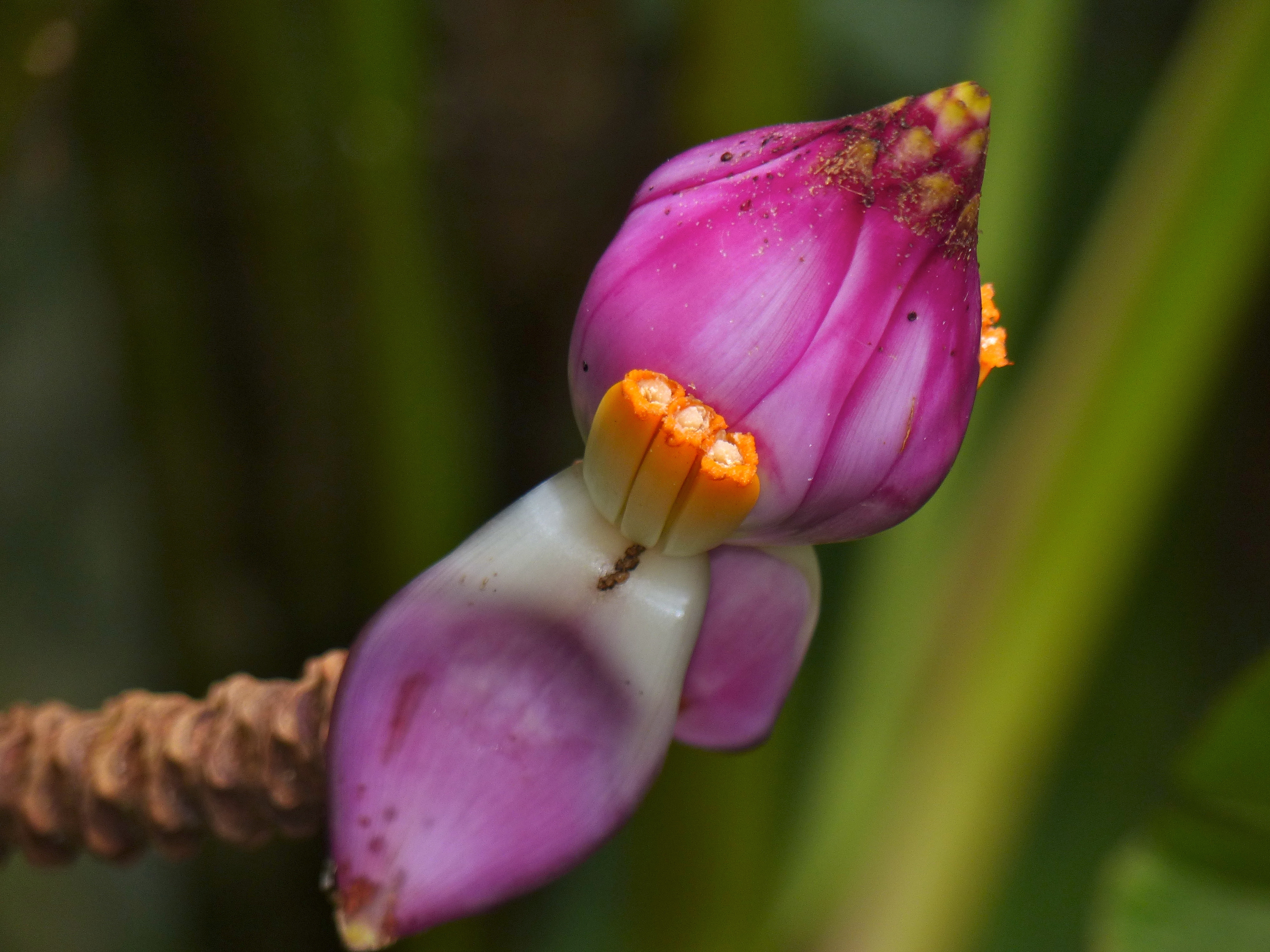
Inflorescence with male flowers
