= Musa yunnanensis =

Scientific classification
- Kingdom: Plantae
- Clade: Embryophytes
- Clade: Tracheophytes
- Clade: Spermatophytes
- Clade: Angiosperms
- Clade: Monocots
- Clade: Commelinids
- Order: Zingiberales
- Family: Musaceae
- Genus: Musa
- Section: Musa sect. Musa
- Species: M. yunnanensis

Binomial name
- Musa yunnanensis Häkkinen & H.Wang

Varieties
- M. y. var. caii Hakkinen & H.Wang; M. y. var. yongpingensis Hakkinen & H.Wang; M. y. var. yunnanensis (autonym)

Species of flowering plant

Musa yunnanensis, commonly known as either Yunnan banana or wild forest banana, is a recently described plant in the banana and plantain family native to Yunnan in southern China. The type specimen was collected in 2005 in Xishuangbanna (an autonomous prefecture bordering on Indochina), at an elevation c. 1,150 meters.

Although M. yunnanesis grows in montane tropical forest, it is both shade and frost tolerant, and sensitive to direct sunlight, and so is essentially an understory plant. Individuals typically reach about 5 – 5.25 meters in height at maturation. Bark on pseudostems is coated in wax that is white with a bluish cast. The upper surface of the leaves are also bluish, though their undersides are red hued.

Musa yunnanensis has value to local wildlife; its summer fruits are consumed by birds, bats, and possibly elephants.

== Gallery ==
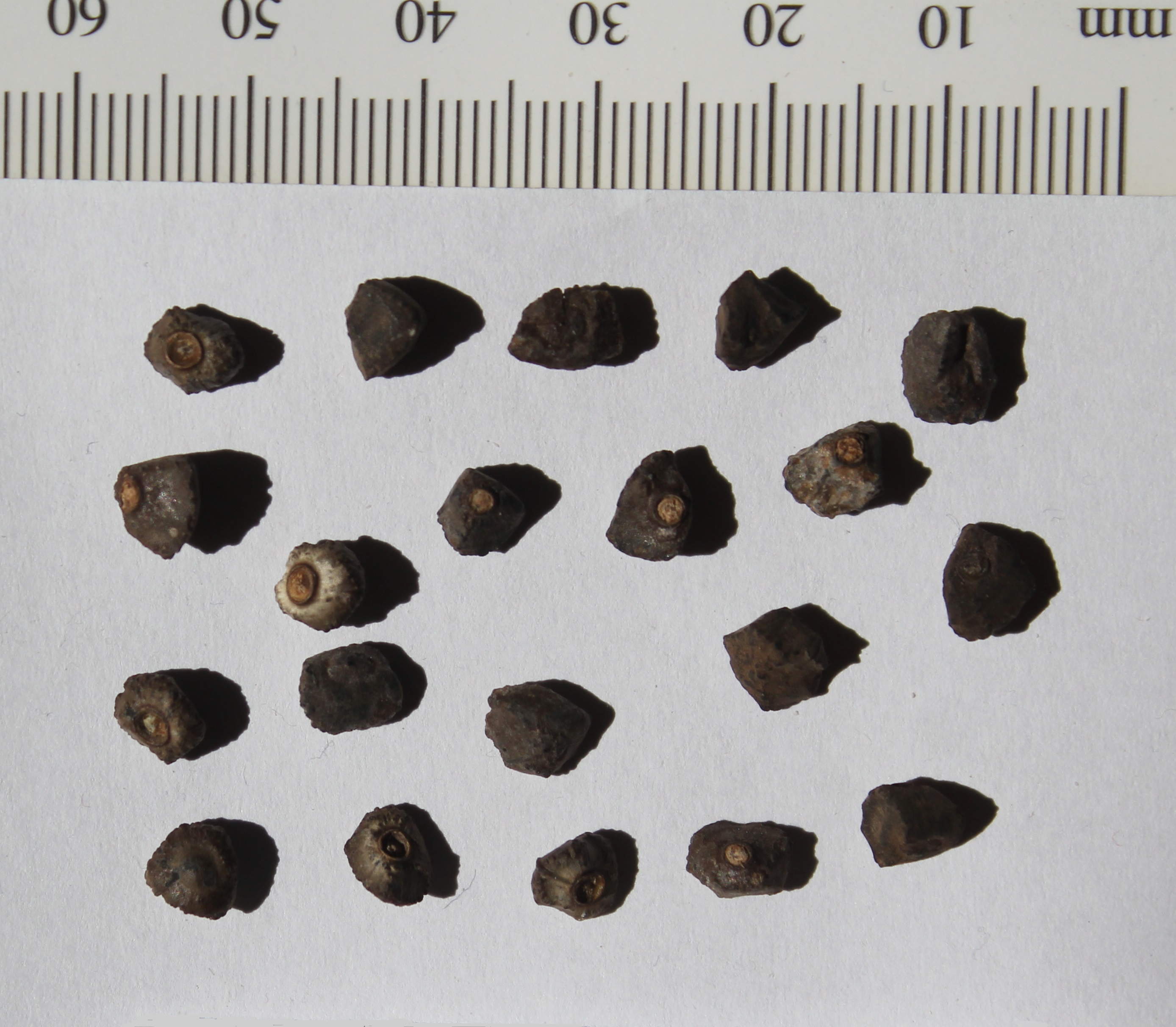
Seeds
