= Musa paracoccinea =

Scientific classification
- Kingdom: Plantae
- Clade: Embryophytes
- Clade: Tracheophytes
- Clade: Spermatophytes
- Clade: Angiosperms
- Clade: Monocots
- Clade: Commelinids
- Order: Zingiberales
- Family: Musaceae
- Genus: Musa
- Section: Musa sect. Callimusa
- Species: M. paracoccinea

Binomial name
- Musa paracoccinea A.Z.Liu & D.Z.Li

Species of flowering plant

Musa paracoccinea is a tropical and subtropical Asian species of plant in the banana family native to both China (southeastern Yunnan province) and Indochina (northern Vietnam). It is placed in section Callimusa (now including the former section Australimusa), members of which have a diploid chromosome number of 2n = 20.
