= Musa cheesmanii =

Conservation status
- Least Concern (IUCN 3.1)

Scientific classification
- Kingdom: Plantae
- Clade: Embryophytes
- Clade: Tracheophytes
- Clade: Spermatophytes
- Clade: Angiosperms
- Clade: Monocots
- Clade: Commelinids
- Order: Zingiberales
- Family: Musaceae
- Genus: Musa
- Section: Musa sect. Musa
- Species: M. cheesmanii

Binomial name
- Musa cheesmanii N.W.Simmonds

Species of flowering plant

Musa cheesmanii is a species of wild banana (genus Musa), commonly found from Myanmar to northeast India. They were discovered in 1955 by N.W. Simmons on a banana expedition. Locally they are referred to by the name Lungkang (Lumkong).

== Description ==
A vigorous, medium-sized wild banana native to northeastern India. The pseudostems are densely clustered, dark reddish-brown in color, with a waxy white bloom towards the leaf stem. The female bracts are greenish with a purplish margin and the male bud is purplish. The leaf is bright green above with a light central vein and greyish below with a showy brown-purple vein.
