= Musa insularimontana =

Conservation status
- Critically Endangered (IUCN 3.1)

Scientific classification
- Kingdom: Plantae
- Clade: Embryophytes
- Clade: Tracheophytes
- Clade: Spermatophytes
- Clade: Angiosperms
- Clade: Monocots
- Clade: Commelinids
- Order: Zingiberales
- Family: Musaceae
- Genus: Musa
- Section: Musa sect. Callimusa
- Species: M. insularimontana

Binomial name
- Musa insularimontana Hayata

Species of flowering plant

Musa insularimontana is a species of plant in the banana family native to Taiwan (coastal Lan Yü), where it is known by the name lan yu ba jiao. It is placed in section Callimusa (now including the former section Australimusa), having a diploid chromosome number of 2n = 20.
