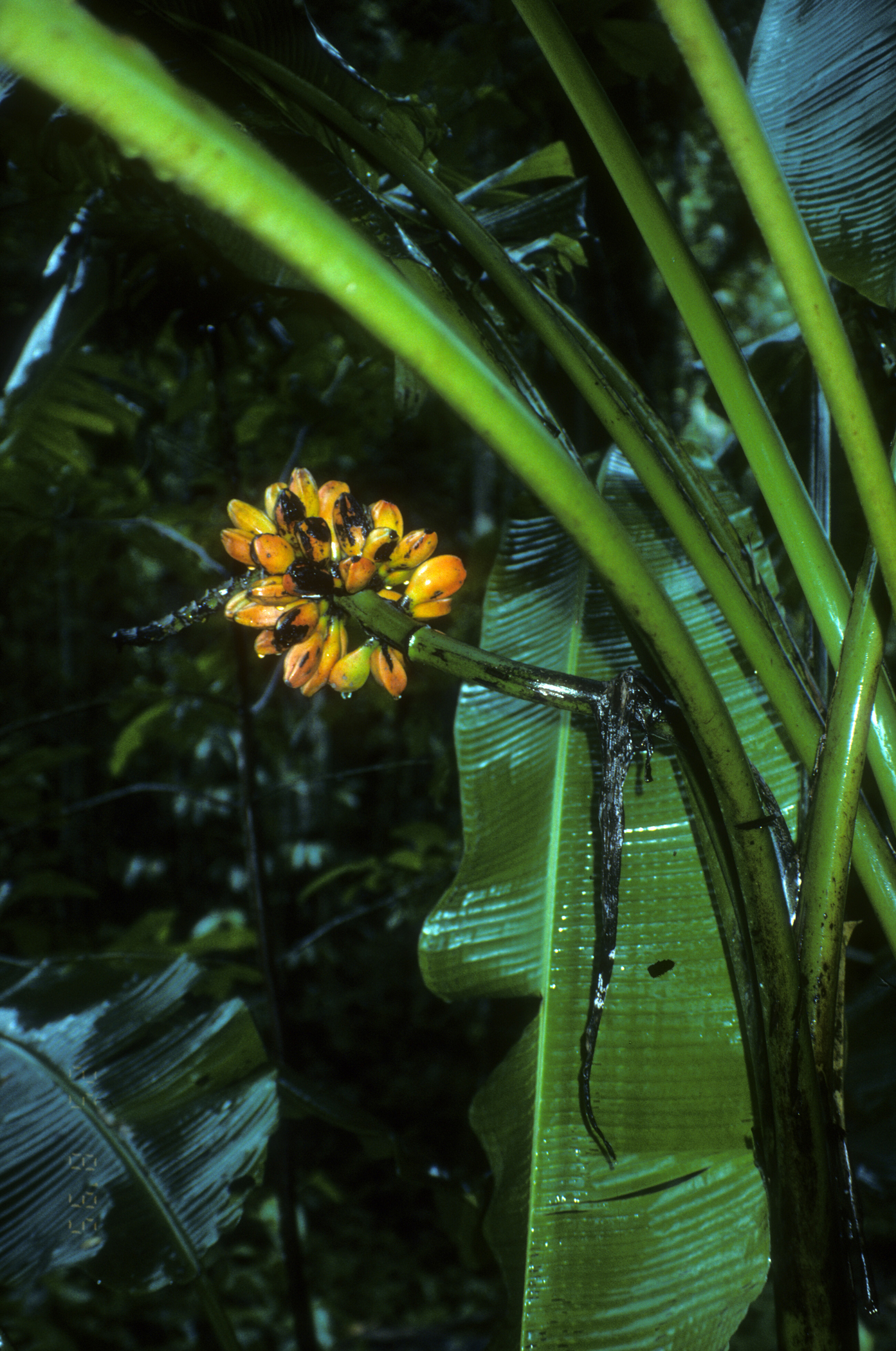
- In Papua

Conservation status
- Least Concern (IUCN 3.1)

Scientific classification
- Kingdom: Plantae
- Clade: Tracheophytes
- Clade: Angiosperms
- Clade: Monocots
- Clade: Commelinids
- Order: Zingiberales
- Family: Musaceae
- Genus: Musa
- Section: Musa sect. Callimusa
- Species: M. lolodensis

Binomial name
- Musa lolodensis Cheesman

= Musa lolodensis =

Species of flowering plant

Musa lolodensis is a species of wild banana (genus Musa), occurring naturally from the Moluccas through to New Guinea. It is placed in section Callimusa (now including the former section Australimusa), having a diploid chromosome number of 2n = 20. It is one of the possible parents of the cultivated Fe'i bananas.

== Description ==
This plant can reach heights up to 7 m. It has a naturally rigid, vertically erect stalk. It's distinct feature is that it's fruits are dehiscent, meaning it opens as they reach peak ripeness.

== Distribution ==
Musa lolodensis is native to Indonesia (in Halmahera of the Moluccas, and Papua) and northwestern Papua New Guinea.
