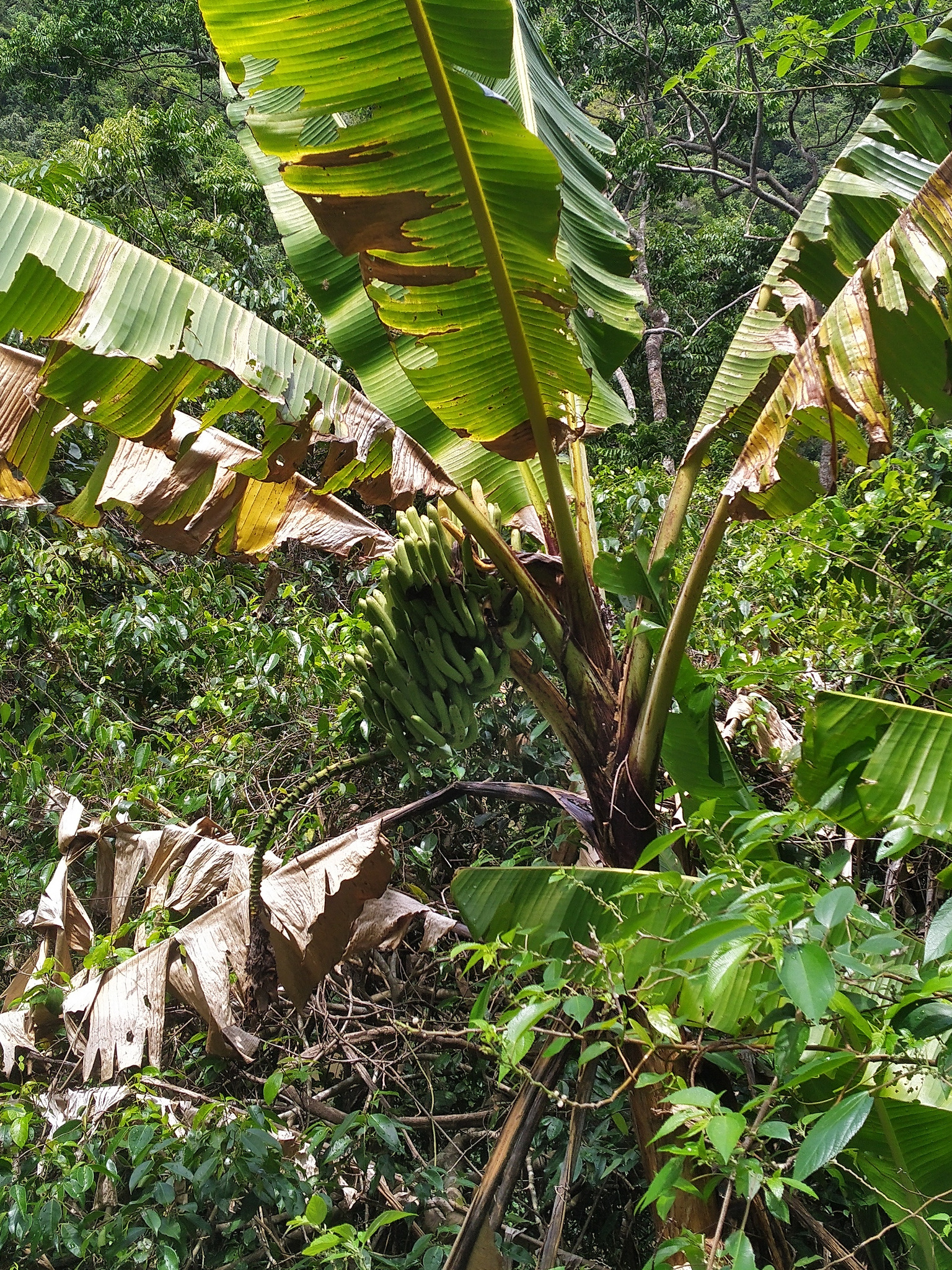

Conservation status
- Least Concern (IUCN 3.1)

Scientific classification
- Kingdom: Plantae
- Clade: Embryophytes
- Clade: Tracheophytes
- Clade: Angiosperms
- Clade: Monocots
- Clade: Commelinids
- Order: Zingiberales
- Family: Musaceae
- Genus: Musa
- Section: Musa sect. Musa
- Species: M. banksii

Binomial name
- Musa banksii F.Muell.

= Musa banksii =

Species of flowering plant

Musa banksii is a species of wild banana, native to New Guinea, Australia (Queensland) and Samoa. It was first described by Ferdinand von Mueller in 1863 from plants collected in Queensland, Australia. Thereafter, taxonomists have variously treated it as a unique species or as a subspecies of Musa acuminata. The first one to note an affinity with Musa acuminata was Ernest E. Cheesman in 1948. In 1957, Norman Simmonds reclassified it as a subspecies of Musa acuminata based on extensive field observations in New Guinea, Australia, and Samoa. In 1976, George Argent chose to treat it as a species.
