= Buttermilk Creek =

Buttermilk Creek may refer to:

== In Canada ==
- Buttermilk Creek (Renfrew County), a tributary of the Muskrat River in the township of Whitewater Region, Ontario
- Buttermilk Creek (Lambton County), a tributary of Stonehouse Drain in the town of Petrolia, Ontario

== In the United States ==
- Buttermilk Creek Complex, an archaeological site west of Salado, Texas
- Buttermilk Creek (Cayuga Inlet), a creek tributary of Cayuga Inlet in Buttermilk Falls State Park, south of Ithaca, New York
- A tributary of Cattaraugus Creek, in western New York
- A stream in Alpha, Wisconsin
- A park in Fond du Lac, Wisconsin
- A tributary of Sweetwater Creek (Chattahoochee River), in Georgia
- A stream that runs through Robinson Township, Brown County, Kansas
- Buttermilk Creek (Susquehanna River)
