= West Branch Cayuga Inlet =

Location
- Country: United States
- State: New York

Physical characteristics
- Mouth: Cayuga Inlet
  - location: Newfield, New York, United States
  - coordinates: 42°22′30″N 76°33′17″W
- Basin size: 9.52 sq mi (24.7 km^{2})

West Branch Cayuga Inlet is a river located in Tompkins County, New York. It flows into Cayuga Inlet east of Newfield, New York.
