= Vanbuskirk Gulf =

Location
- Country: United States
- State: New York

Physical characteristics
- Mouth: Cayuga Inlet
  - location: Newfield, New York, United States
  - coordinates: 42.34726°N 76.54015°W

Vanbuskirk Gulf is a river located in Tompkins County, New York. It flows into Cayuga Inlet southeast of Newfield, New York.
