= Upland and lowland =

Types of plain

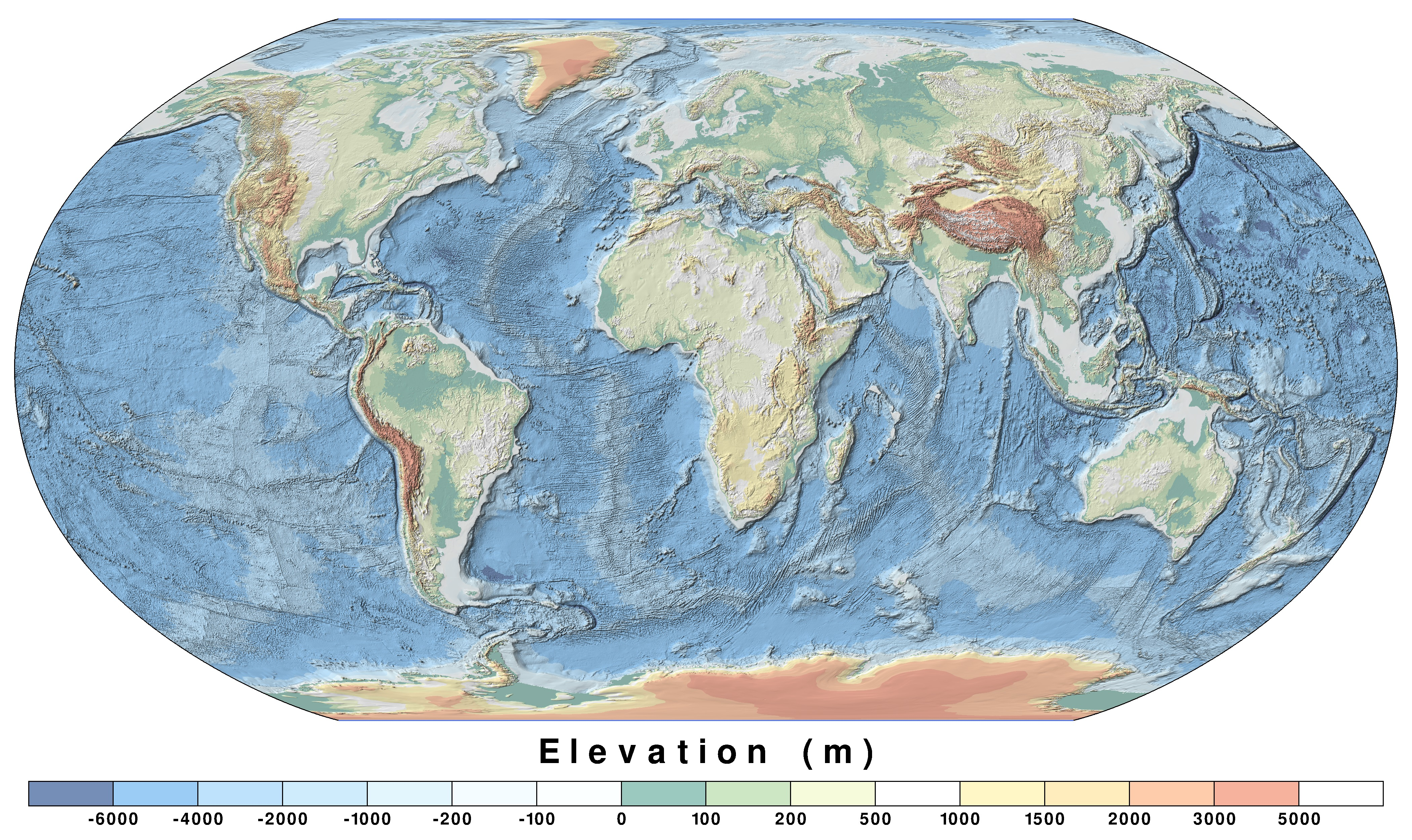
Map of the world showing elevation levels

Upland and lowland are conditional descriptions of a plain based on elevation above sea level. In studies of the ecology of freshwater rivers, habitats are classified as upland or lowland.

== Definitions ==
Upland and lowland are portions of a plain that are conditionally categorized by their elevation above the sea level. Lowlands are usually no higher than 200 m (660 ft), while uplands are somewhere around 200 m (660 ft) to 500 m (1,600 ft). On unusual occasions, certain lowlands such as the Caspian Depression lie below sea level. Uplands areas tend to spike into valleys and mountains, forming mountain ranges while lowland areas tend to be uniformly flat, although both can vary such as the Mongolian Plateau.

Upland habitats are cold, clear and rocky whose rivers are fast-flowing in mountainous areas; lowland habitats are warm with slow-flowing rivers found in relatively flat lowland areas, with water that is frequently colored by sediment and organic matter.

These classifications overlap with the geological definitions of "upland" and "lowland". In geology an "upland" is generally considered to be land that is at a higher elevation than the alluvial plain or stream terrace, which are considered to be "lowlands". The term "bottomland" refers to low-lying alluvial land near a river.

Much freshwater fish and invertebrate communities around the world show a pattern of specialization into upland or lowland river habitats. Classifying rivers and streams as upland or lowland is important in freshwater ecology, as the two types of river habitat are very different, and usually support very different populations of fish and invertebrate species.

== Uplands ==
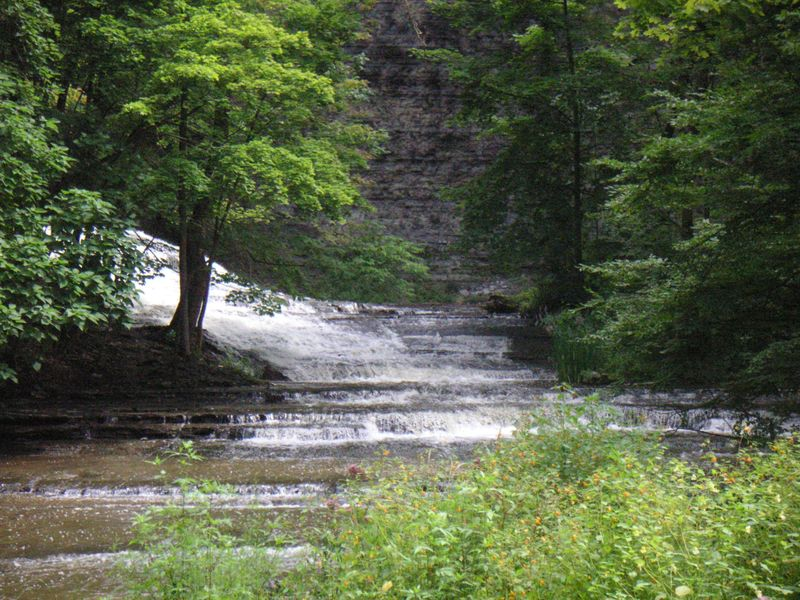
Cascadilla Creek, near Ithaca, New York, in the United States, an example of an upland river habitat

In freshwater ecology, upland rivers and streams are the fast-flowing rivers and streams that drain elevated or mountainous country, often onto broad alluvial plains (where they become lowland rivers). However, elevation is not the sole determinant of whether a river is upland or lowland. Arguably the most important determinants are those of stream power and stream gradient. Rivers with a course that drops rapidly in elevation will have faster water flow and higher stream power or "force of water". This in turn produces the other characteristics of an upland river—an incised course, a river bed dominated by bedrock and coarse sediments, a riffle and pool structure and cooler water temperatures. Rivers with a course that drops in elevation very slowly will have slower water flow and lower force. This in turn produces the other characteristics of a lowland river—a meandering course lacking rapids, a river bed dominated by fine sediments and higher water temperatures. Lowland rivers tend to carry more suspended sediment and organic matter as well, but some lowland rivers have periods of high water clarity in seasonal low-flow periods.

The generally clear, cool, fast-flowing waters and bedrock and coarse sediment beds of upland rivers encourage fish species with limited temperature tolerances, high oxygen needs, strong swimming ability and specialised reproductive strategies to prevent eggs or larvae being swept away. These characteristics also encourage invertebrate species with limited temperature tolerances, high oxygen needs and ecologies revolving around coarse sediments and interstices or "gaps" between those coarse sediments.

The term "upland" is also used in wetland ecology, where "upland" plants indicate an area that is not a wetland.

== Lowlands ==
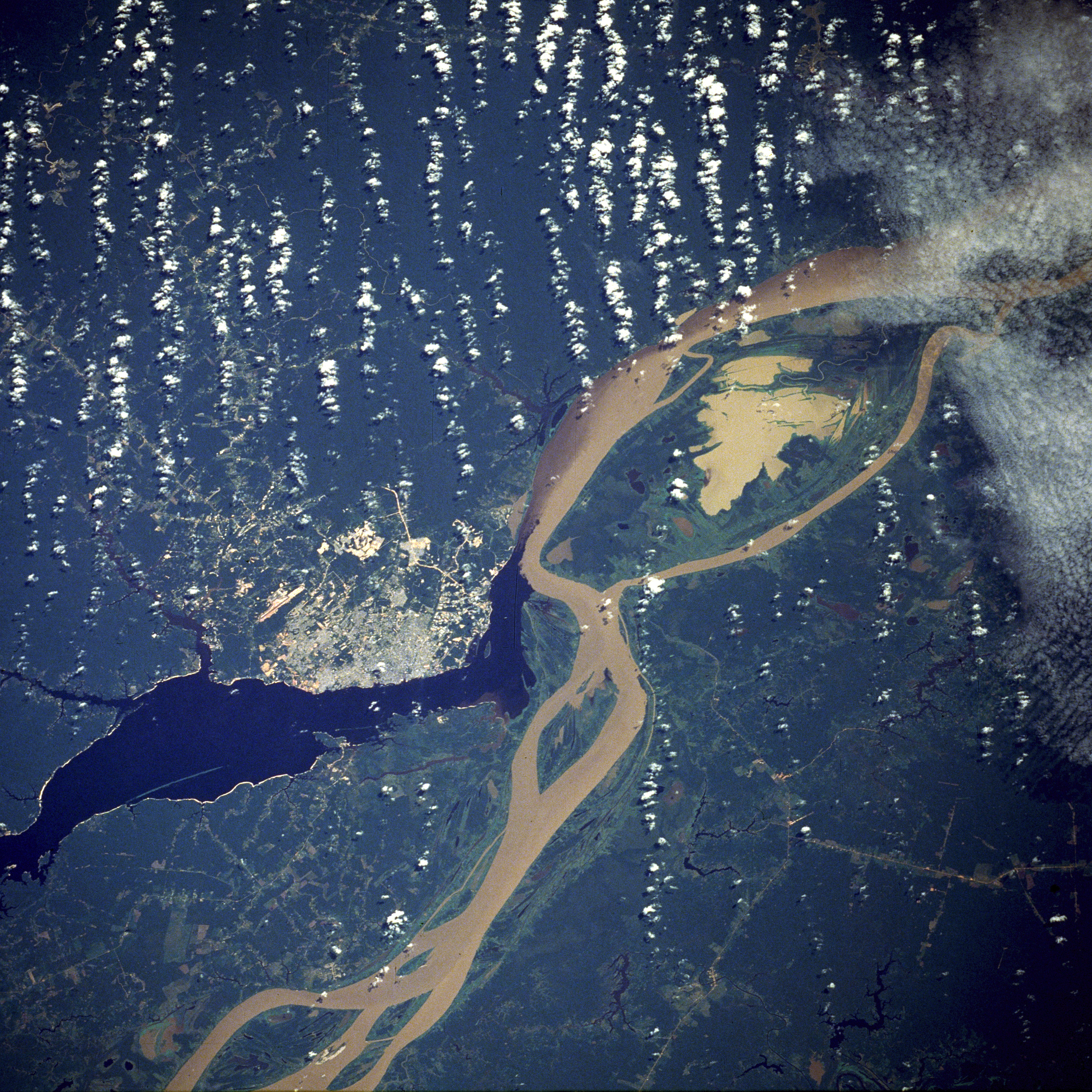
Amazon River near Manaus, Brazil, an example of a lowland river habitat

The generally more turbid, warm, slow-flowing waters and fine sediment beds of lowland rivers encourage fish species with broad temperature tolerances and greater tolerances to low oxygen levels, and life history and breeding strategies adapted to these and other traits of lowland rivers. These characteristics also encourage invertebrate species with broad temperature tolerances and greater tolerances to low oxygen levels and ecologies revolving around fine sediments or alternative habitats such as submerged woody debris ("snags") or submergent macrophytes ("water weed").

=== Lowland alluvial plains ===
Lowland alluvial plains form when there is deposition of sediment over a long period of time by one or more rivers coming from highland regions, and then are deposited in lowland regions for long periods of time. Examples include American Bottom, a flood plain of the Mississippi River in Southern Illinois, Bois Brule Bottom, and Bottomland hardwood forest a deciduous hardwood forest found in broad lowland floodplains of the United States.

== See also ==
- Freshwater biology
- Highland
- Mountain river
- River reclamation
- Riparian zone
- Plateau
