= Cascadilla Creek =

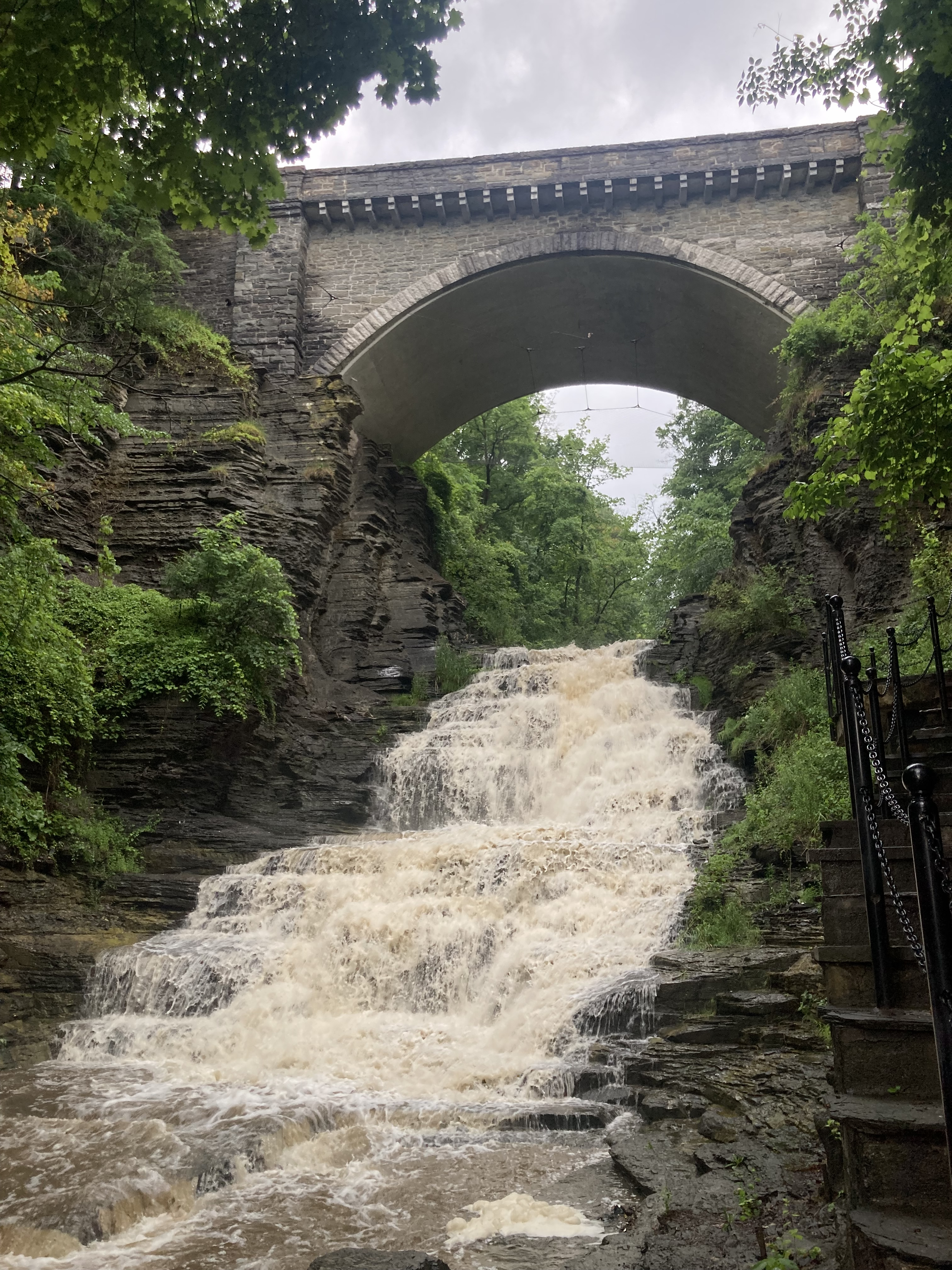
- Cascadilla Creek in a gorge, by Cornell University's campus

Location
- Country: United States
- State: New York

Physical characteristics
- Mouth: Cayuga Inlet
  - location: Ithaca, New York, United States
  - coordinates: 42°27′06″N 76°30′36″W
- Basin size: 13.7 mi^{2} (35 km^{2})

Cascadilla Creek is a river located in Tompkins County, New York. It flows into Cayuga Inlet by Ithaca, New York. Its headwaters are located in Ellis Hollow, New York. While it is in the Cascadilla Gorge, the river flows through Cornell University's campus. A majority of the creek's 13.7-square-mile (35 km^{2}) watershed is forested, and portions are maintained as preserves by the Cornell Botanic Gardens and Finger Lakes Land Trust.

The land surrounding the creek has seen substantial development over the past 200 years. The portion that flows through Ithaca was routed through a channel in the 1830s, and throughout the 19th century a number of mills were run on its course. In the 20th century, Cornell developed a gorge trail along the river and constructed a number of buildings in its vicinity, including the Wilson Synchrotron, which necessitated rerouting a segment of the creek.

== Geography ==
Cascadilla Creek originates in Ellis Hollow, also known as the Cascadilla Creek Valley, about 6 miles (9.7 km) east of Ithaca, New York. From there, the creek flows through a portion of the East Ithaca Recreation Way and the Upper Cascadilla Natural Area. In this region, the land immediately surrounding the creek is characterized by "buffering" forests. Next it passes into a narrow channel which carries the creek through a former floodplain known as "Cascadilla Meadows" and to Dwyer Dam.

The creek continues past this dam and through the Cornell University campus, where it is contained within the Cascadilla Gorge and drops 400 feet (120 m). The gorge divides Cornell's Central Campus from Ithaca's Collegetown neighborhood. Notable buildings near the creek along this stretch include the Cornell Central Heating Plant, the Wilson Synchrotron, Cascadilla Hall, and Myron Taylor Hall.

Finally, the creek flows through Ithaca and into Cayuga Inlet.

== Ecology ==
The creek has a drainage basin of 13.7 square miles (35 km^{2}). In 2012, the watershed was estimated to be 60.8% forested, 21.7% agricultural, and 16.7% urban land. The creek's highest recorded flow was 1,400 cubic feet (40 m^{3}) per second on July 8, 1935. There is no active gauging station that measure's the creek's flow. Four major creeks flowing into Cayuga Lake through Ithaca, Cascadilla Creek, Fall Creek, Six Mile Creek, and the Cayuga Inlet Creek, contribute approximately 40% of the lake's inflow.

In the spring, white suckers spawn in the bottom portion of the lake before returning to Cayuga Lake.

== Geologic history ==
The Cascadilla Valley pre-glacial, and given that its direction does not parallel the direction that ice flowed during the glacial era, is thought to have not been substantially deepened by glaciers. The Cascadilla Gorge is cut into Devonian-era sedimentary rock deposited over 360 million years ago. The gorge was formed by the river's erosion after the glacial era, over the past 20,000 years.

== History ==
The origins of the name "Cascadilla" are unclear: it may have come from the Spanish for "little waterfall", been derived from an indigenous word, or began as a portmanteau of the words "cascade" and "dell".

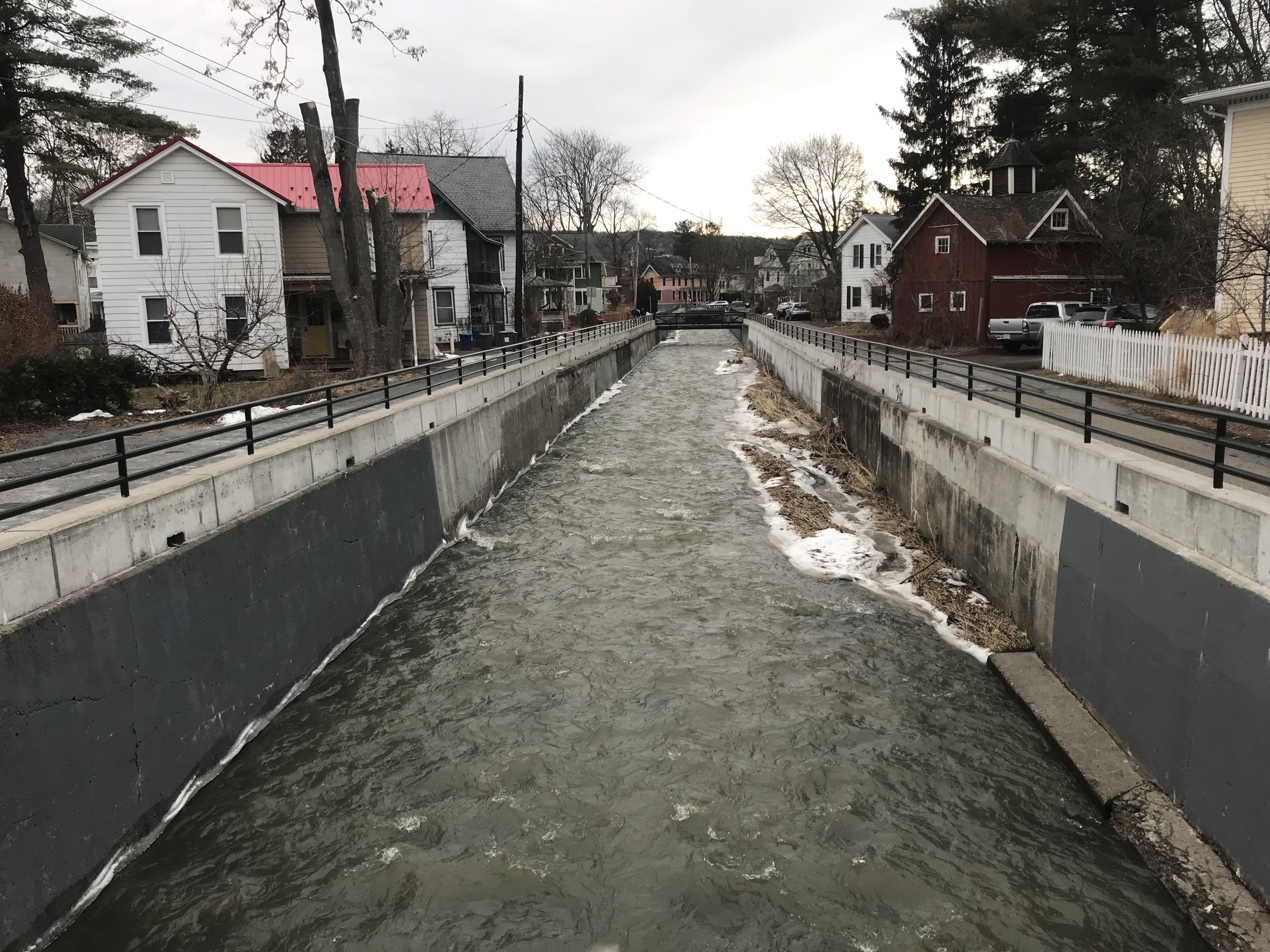
Cascadilla Creek is contained within a man-made channel as it flows through Ithaca

=== Development and industry (1791 to 1900) ===
In 1791, John Yaple constructed the first mill in Ithaca on Cascadilla Creek. The first European to settle near the creek's headwaters, Peleg Ellis, built a log cabin there in 1799. As a result, the region became known as Ellis Hollow. In 1836, the segment of the stream that flowed through Ithaca was straightened and put through a man-made channel.

Various other mills were constructed on the creek throughout the 19th century, as well as several dams to supply water to industry. These include a dam constructed by Daniel Bates to provide water to a tannery (1823), a dam for a cotton factory run by Otis Eddy (1826). Other facilities that were powered by the creek included a grist mill run by Simeon De Witt, a window-sash factory, and a chair factory.

In 1871, a length of the Utica, Ithaca & Elmira Railroad was constructed along Cascadilla Creek, dramatically impacting the wetlands that it passed through. A wooden bridge connecting Collegetown with Cornell was replaced by a stone arch bridge in 1898.

Raw sewage was dumped into the river until at least 1908, when the City of Ithaca began wastewater treatment.

=== Later history ===
In the early 20th century, Cornell hockey teams would occasionally play on the creek near Dwyer's Dam when it froze in the winter.

In 1909, Robert H. Treman purchased the land in the Cascadilla Gorge, which he donated to Cornell. From 1928 to 1931 the University constructed a trail that went up the gorge, with funding contributed by Henry Sackett. The horticulturist Laurence Howland MacDaniels planted a nut grove in upper Cascadilla Creek in the 1930s.

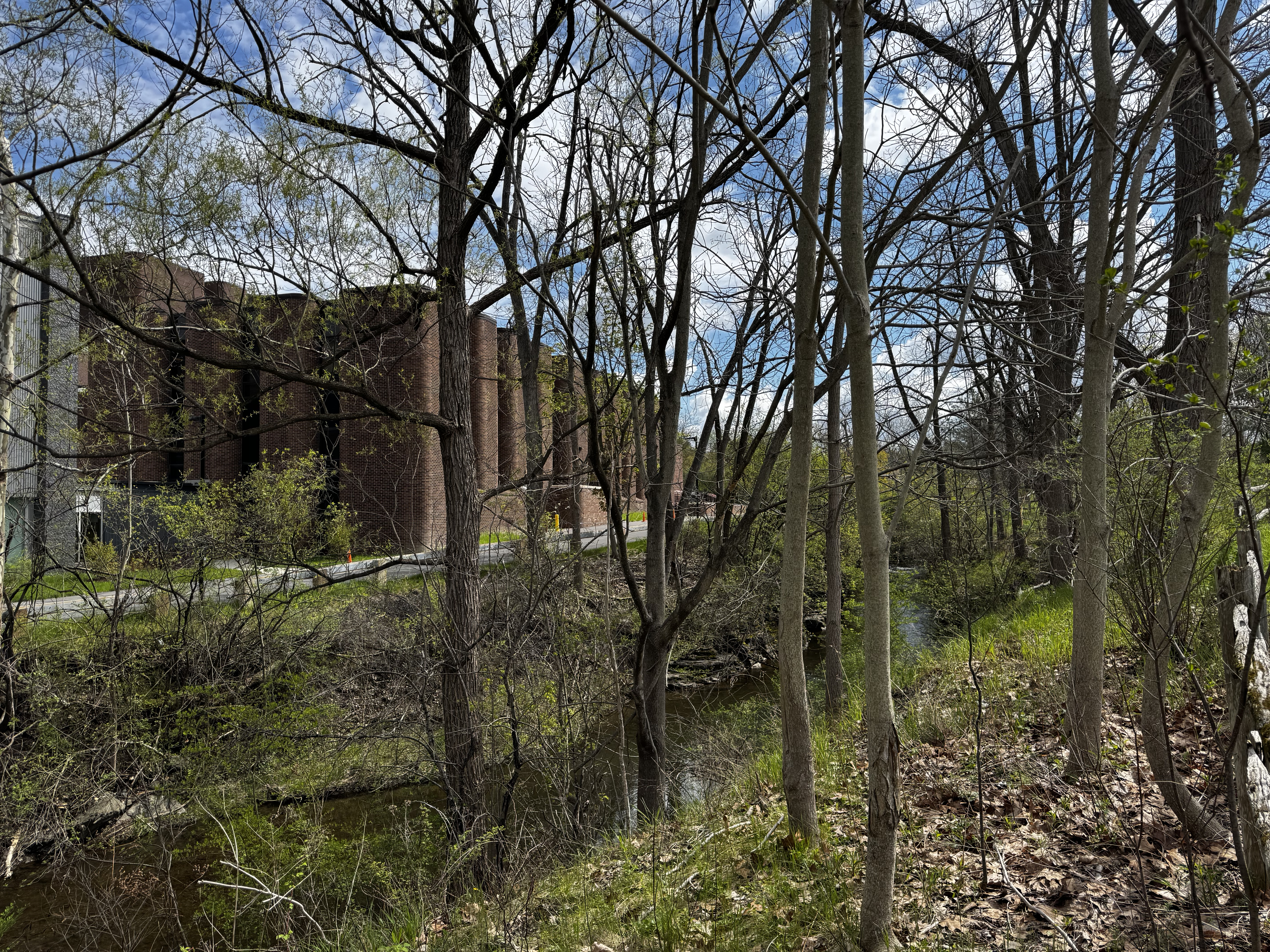
Cascadilla Creek as it flows by the Wilson Synchrotron

During the construction of the Wilson Synchrotron in the 1960s, the portion of Cascadilla Creek that flowed through Cascadilla Meadows, which previously meandered in several branches across the floodplain, was routed into a man-made channel. Cornell proposed building a large building to house the Cornell Theory Center bordering Cascadilla Gorge in 1987. After encountering community opposition and an opposing vote by the Ithaca Planning Board, who feared it would harm the natural state of the gorge, a smaller version was built, slightly further away from the gorge.

In the late 20th century, Cornell was responsible for several chemical spills into the creek, including one in 1974, which killed an estimated 50,000 fish, and another in 1979.

In the summer of 1997, Cornell worked to redevelop a wetland in the area that had been disturbed by railway construction.

The gorge trail has been closed for repairs from 1996 to 1997 and from 2014 to 2019. In 2011, a 1,200-pound (540 kg) gate designed by a local artist was installed at the base of the trail.

== Preserves ==
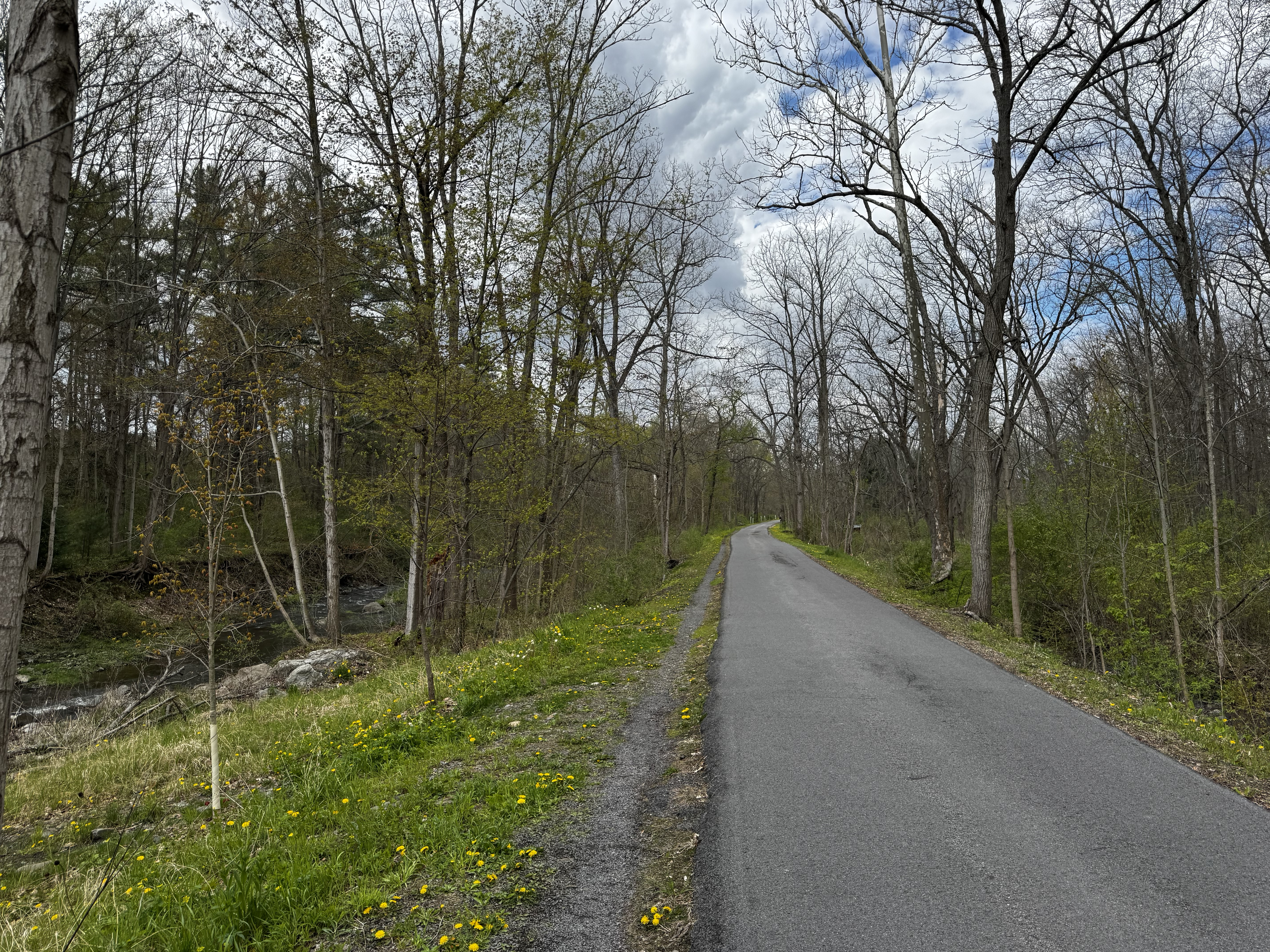
The East Ithaca Recreation Way in the Upper Cascadilla Natural Area.

Preserved wetlands in Ellis Hollow, by the river's headwaters, are managed by the Cornell Botanic Gardens and Finger Lakes Land Trust. The Upper Cascadilla Natural Area and Cascadilla Gorge Natural Areas are also maintained by the Botanic Gardens. The old nut grove, known as the MacDaniels Nut Grove, is managed by Cornell as a forest farm, and the old railway line has been redeveloped into a section of the East Ithaca Recreation Way.

The Cascadilla Gorge Natural Area contains a 1.3 miles (2.1 km) long gorge trail. The lower .3 miles of this trail are closed in the winter.

== In popular culture ==
The poet A. R. Ammons, who taught at Cornell in the 1960s, wrote a poem titled "Cascadilla Falls", that recounts the experience of picking up a stone and pondering the massive geologic forces that had gone into shaping it. The poem was first published in the literary magazine The Quest, and later in the collection Uplands: New Poems (1970). In 2020, a critic deemed it his "best-known waterfall poem".

== Gallery ==
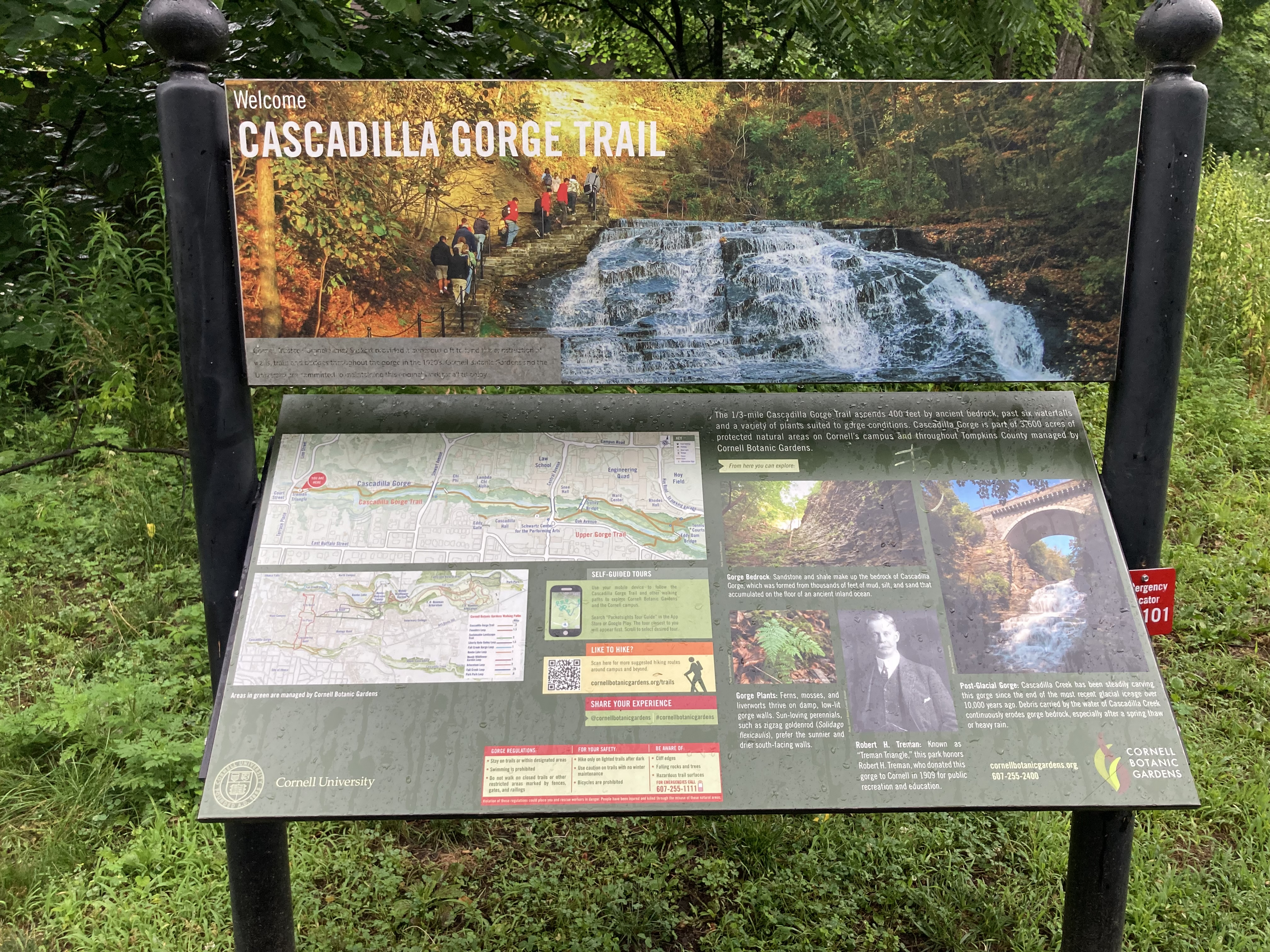

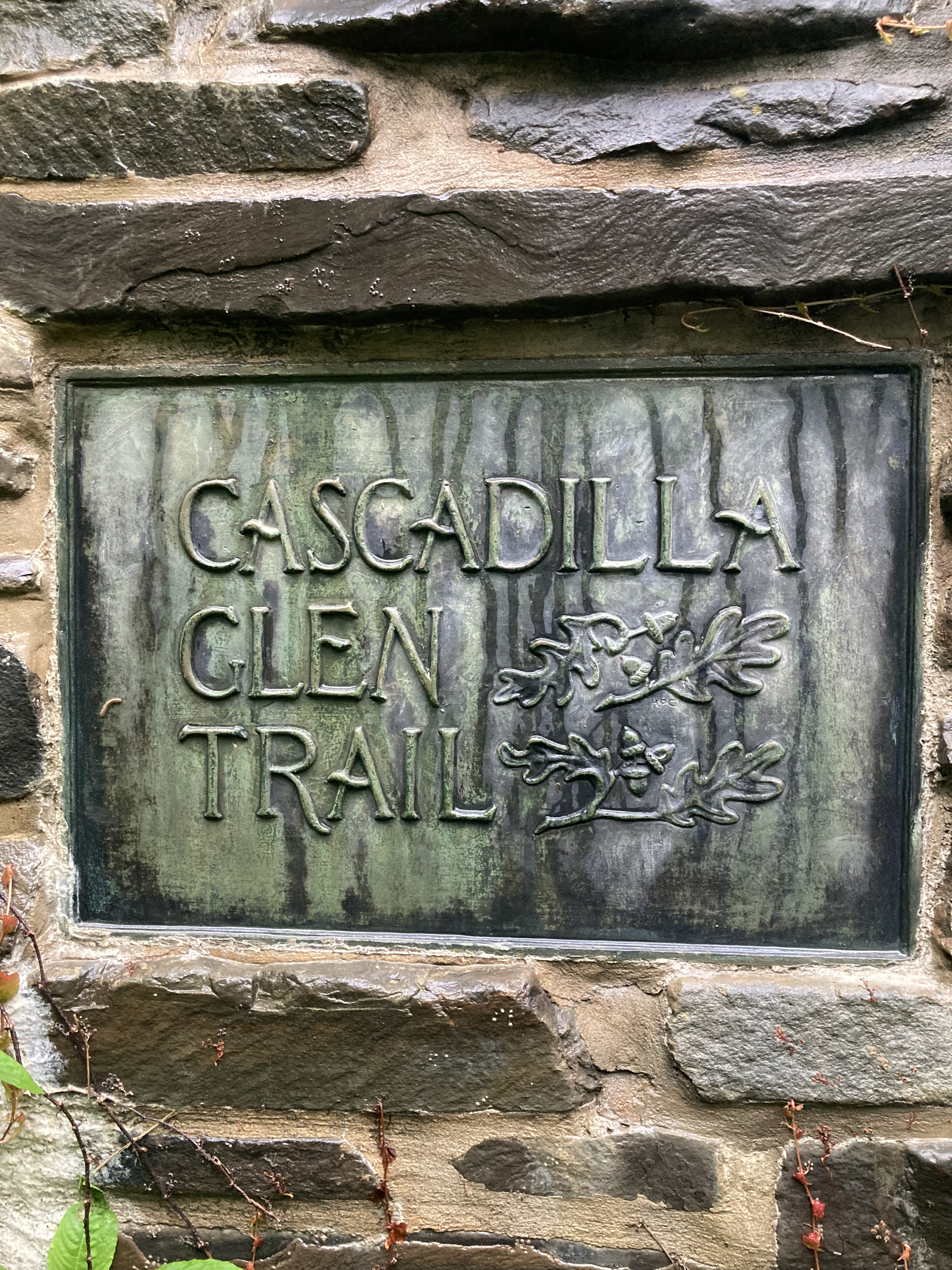

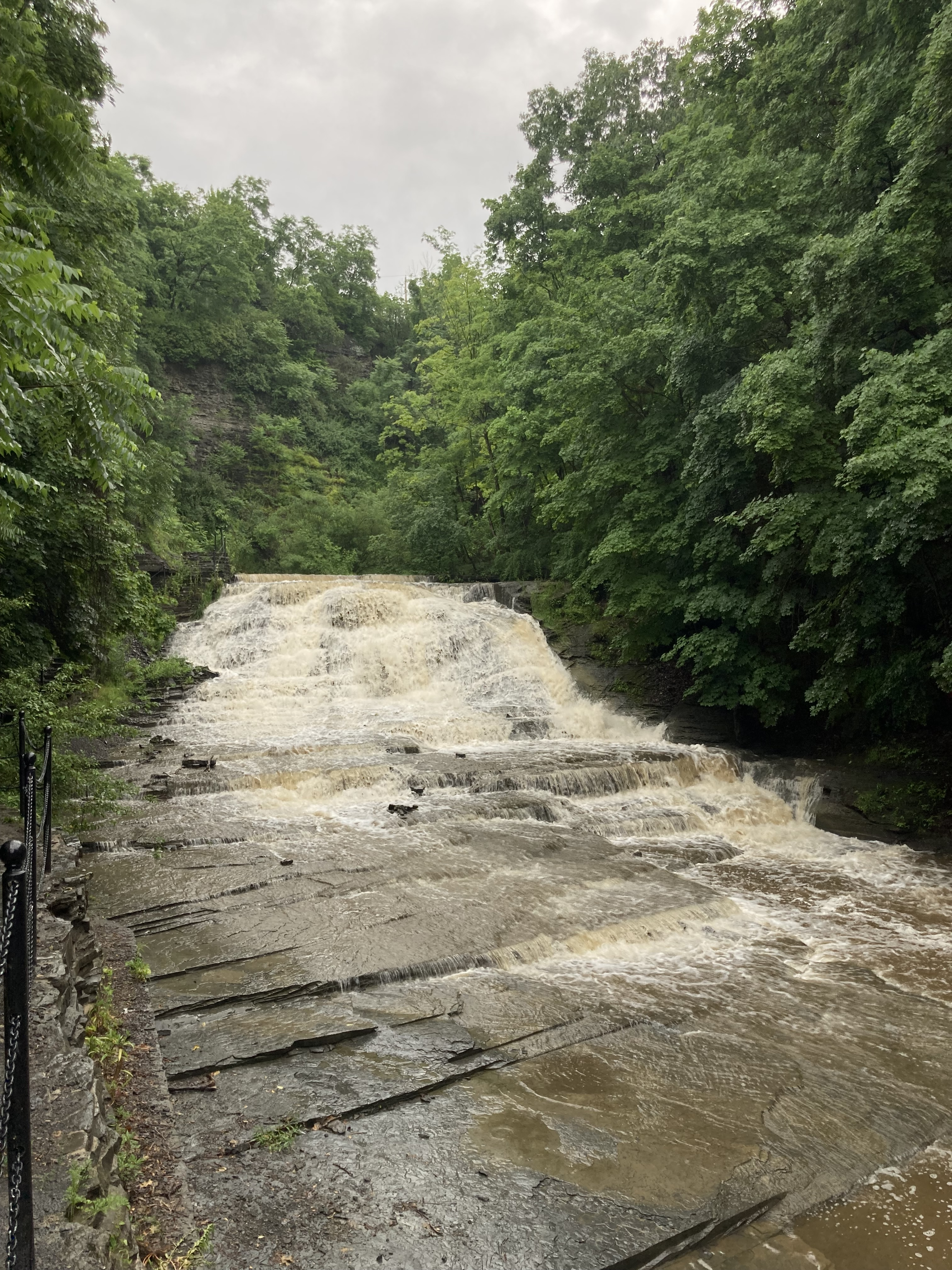

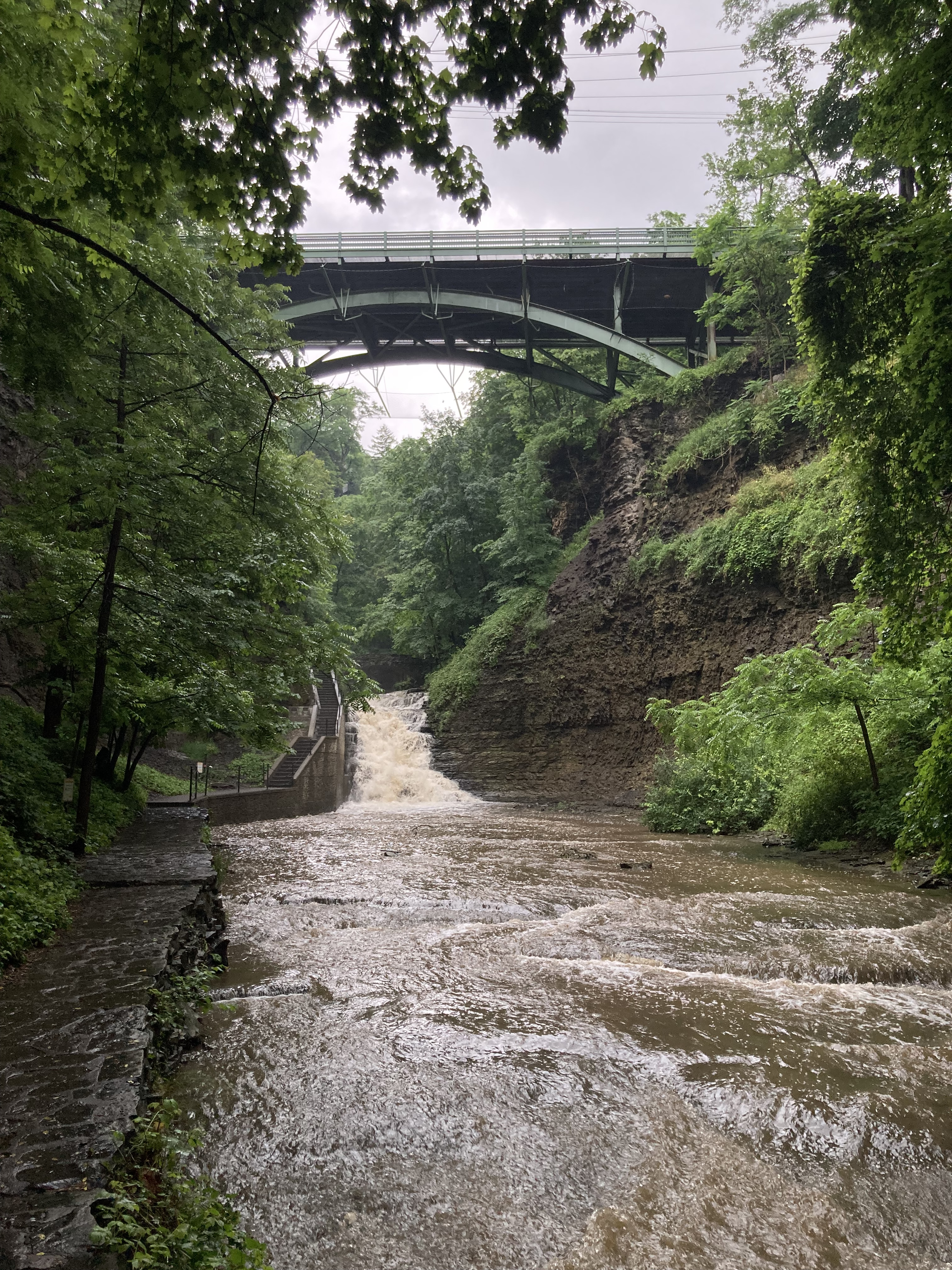

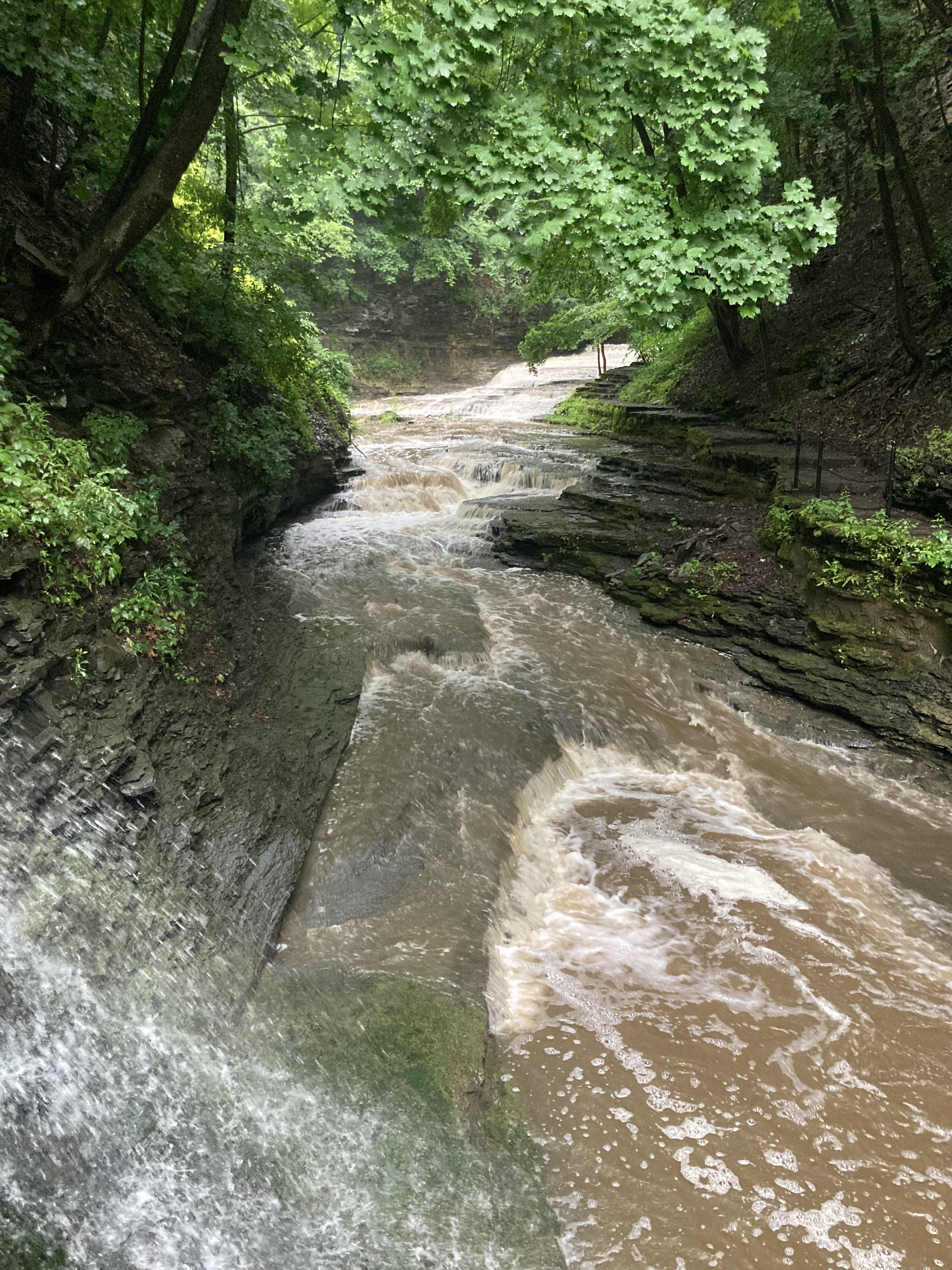

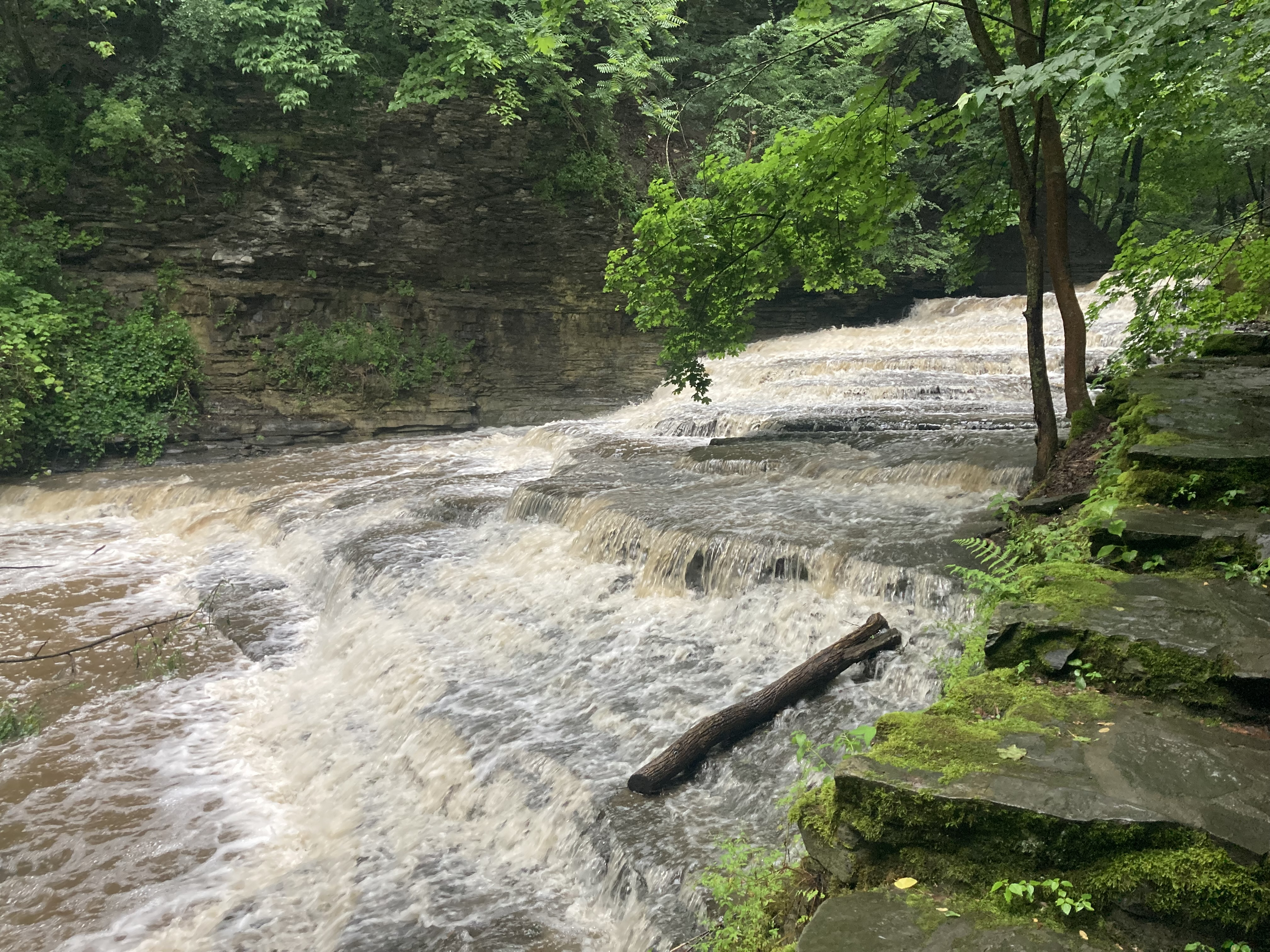

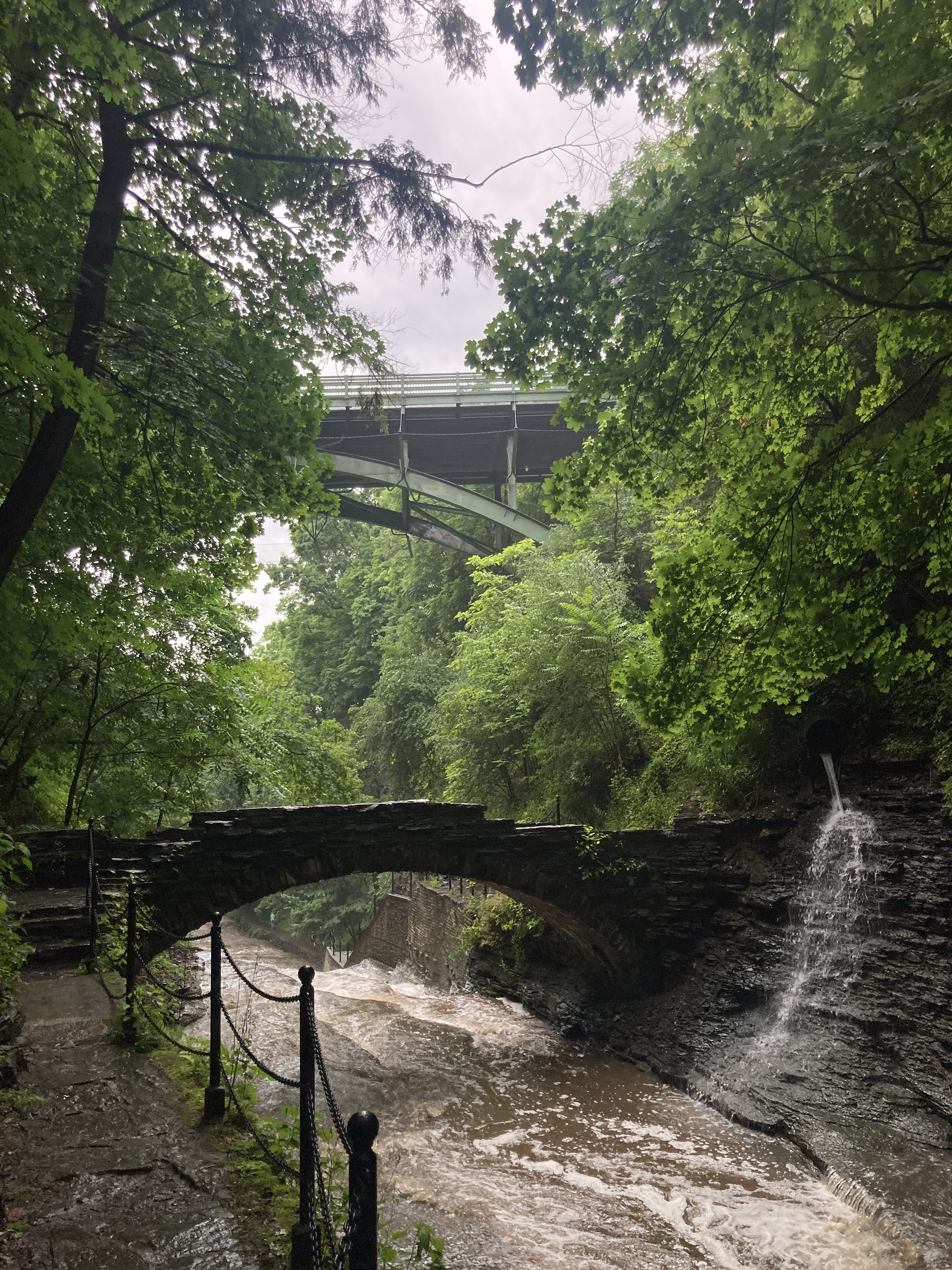

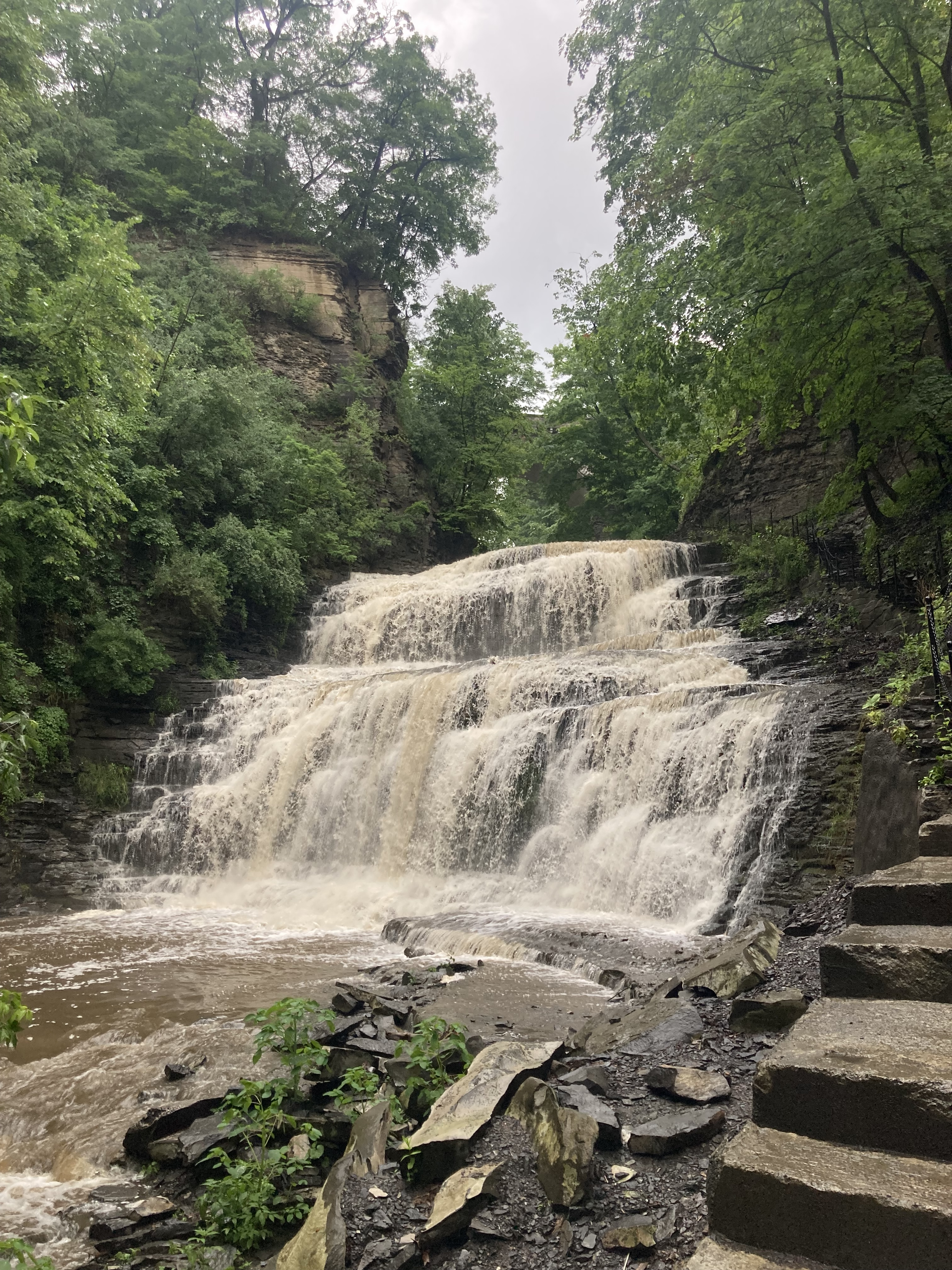

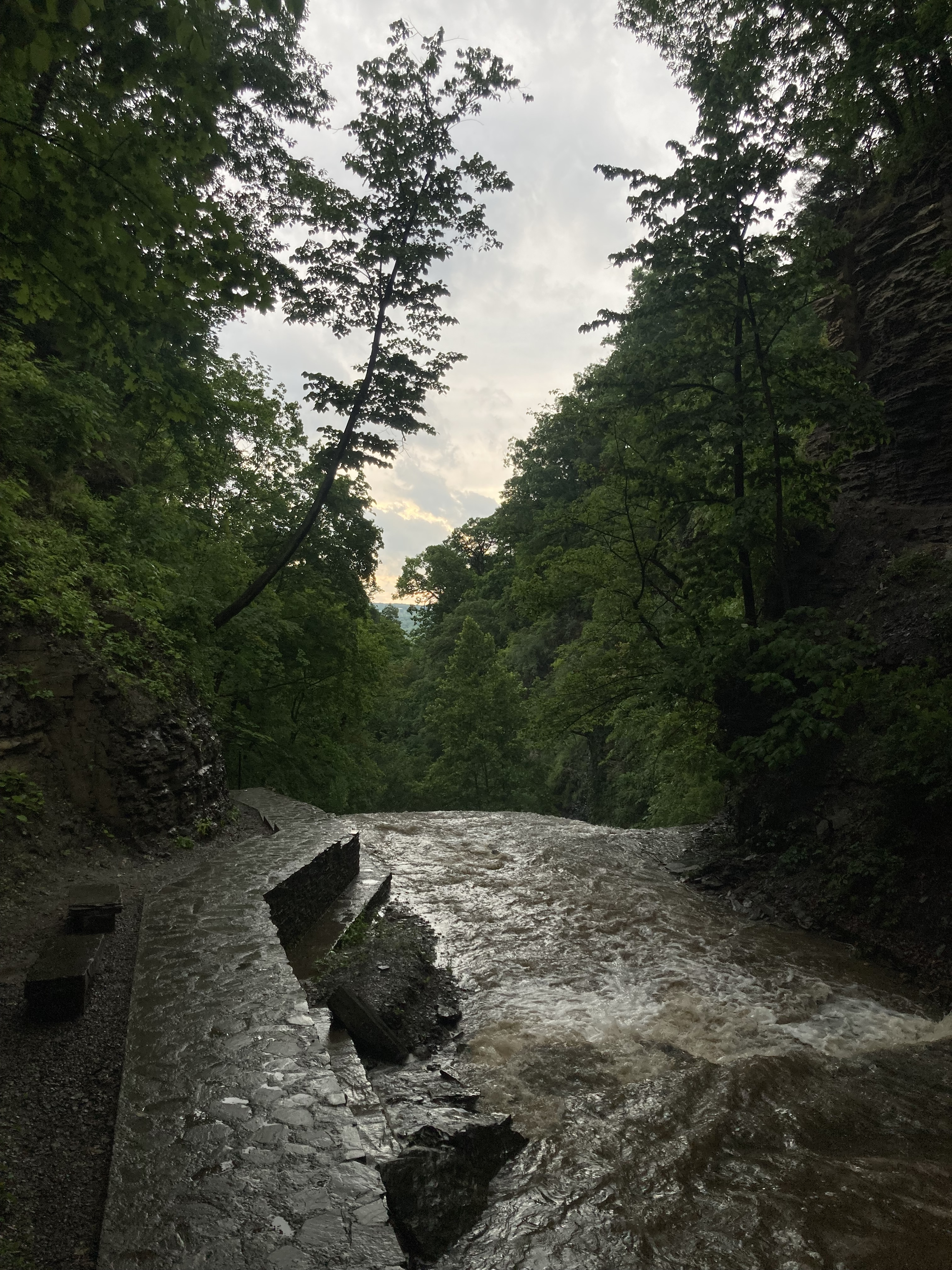
