= Karat banana =

Banana cultivar

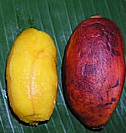
- Peeled and unpeeled Karat bananas
- Genus: Musa
- Species: M. × troglodytarum L.
- Hybrid parentage: Species in Musa section Callimusa
- Cultivar group: Fe'i Group
- Cultivar: various, including 'Karat Kole', 'Karat Pwehu' and 'Karat Pako'
- Origin: Pacific islands, particularly Pohnpei and the Federated States of Micronesia

Karat bananas are local cultivars of Fe'i banana found in Pohnpei, Federated States of Micronesia. The name originates from their bright orange flesh, unusually rich in β-carotene.

They are often treated as a single cultivar, i.e. a distinct cultivated variety, with a name written as Musa 'Karat' in accordance with the International Code of Nomenclature for Cultivated Plants. However, in Pohnpei there are at least three types, 'Karat Kole', 'Karat Pwehu' and 'Karat Pako'. The last has a larger fruit, up to 400–500 g in weight.

Traditionally, the Karat banana was used in Micronesia to wean infants onto solid food. It is much less often eaten there now that imported foods have grown in popularity. However, it is believed that because beta-carotenes are important metabolic precursors of vitamin A, essential for the proper functioning of the retina, giving Karat bananas to young children could help ward off certain kinds of blindness. A campaign to increase the consumption of Karat bananas (and of Fe'i bananas in general) has therefore taken place in Pohnpei.

== See also ==
- Musa
