= Coy Glen =

Location
- Country: United States
- State: New York

Physical characteristics
- Mouth: Cayuga Inlet
  - location: Ithaca, New York, United States
  - coordinates: 42°25′45″N 76°31′17″W
- Basin size: 3.56 mi^{2} (9.2 km^{2})

Coy Glen is a river located in Tompkins County, New York. It flows into Cayuga Inlet by Ithaca, New York.
