= Enfield Creek =

River in the United States

Location
- Country: United States
- State: New York

Physical characteristics
- Mouth: Cayuga Inlet
  - location: Ithaca, New York, United States
  - coordinates: 42°24′04″N 76°32′30″W
- Basin size: 30.5 mi^{2} (79 km^{2})

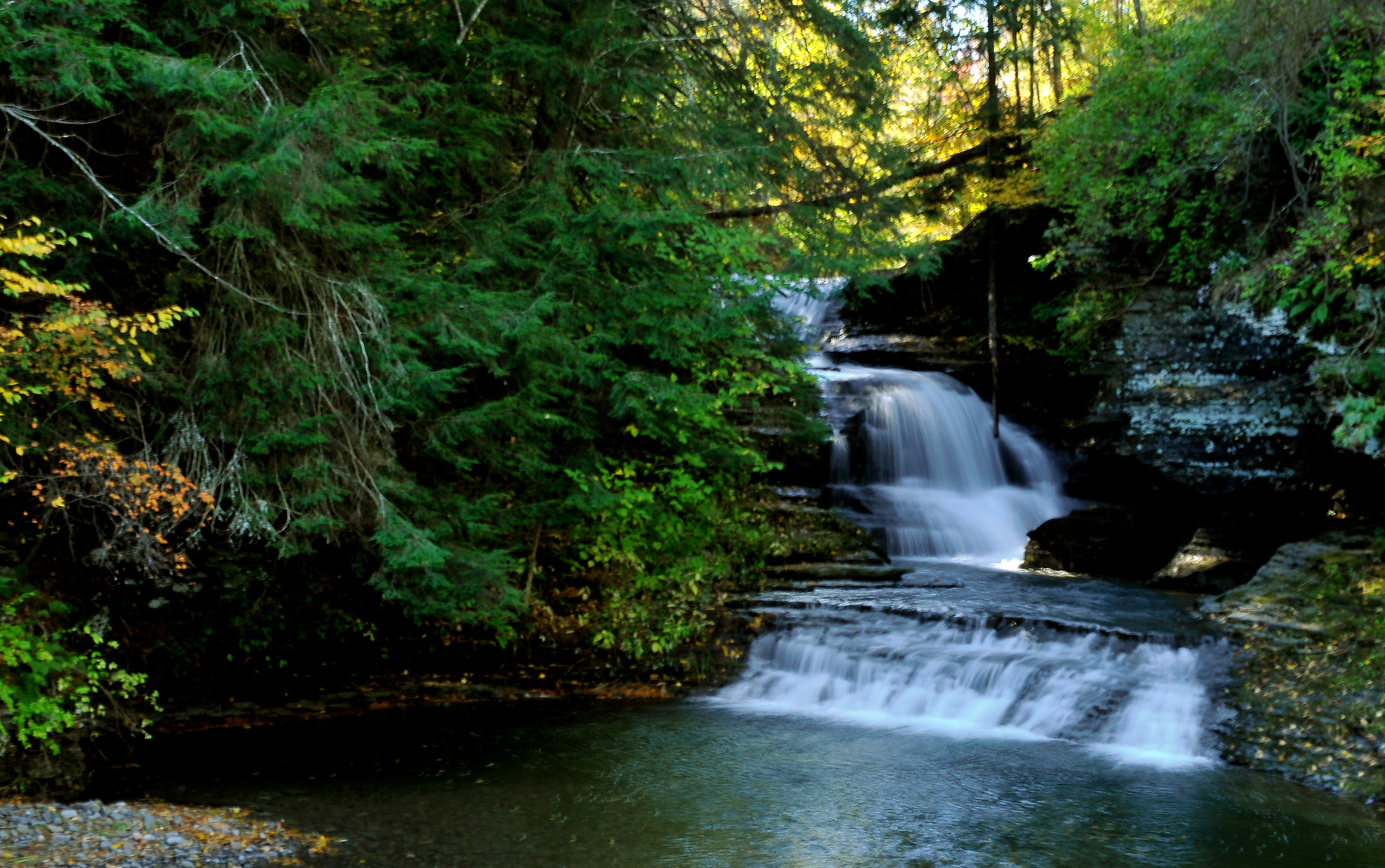
Enfield Creek flows through Robert H. Treman State Park

Enfield Creek is a river located in Tompkins County, New York. It flows into Cayuga Inlet by Ithaca, New York.
