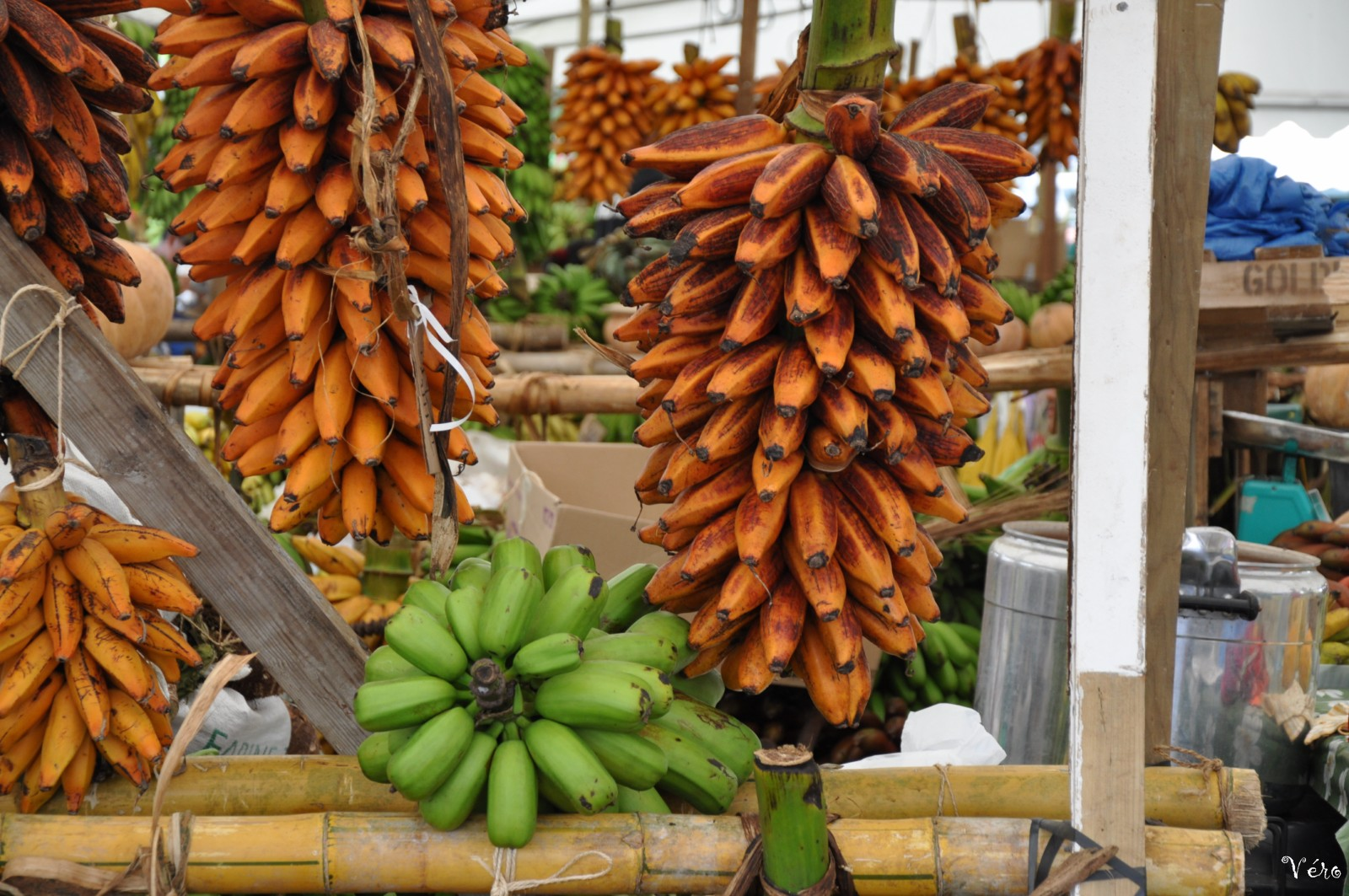
- Fe'i bananas in Tahiti

Scientific classification
- Kingdom: Plantae
- Clade: Embryophytes
- Clade: Tracheophytes
- Clade: Spermatophytes
- Clade: Angiosperms
- Clade: Monocots
- Clade: Commelinids
- Order: Zingiberales
- Family: Musaceae
- Genus: Musa
- Section: Musa sect. Callimusa
- Species: M. troglodytarum

Binomial name
- Musa troglodytarum L.

Synonyms
- Musa × paradisiaca subsp. troglodytarum (L.) K.Schum.; Musa × sapientum var. troglodytarum Baker, nom. illeg.; Musa × sapientum subsp. troglodytarum (L.) Baker; Musa uranoscopos Lour., nom. illeg. superfl.; Musa fehi Bertero ex Vieill.; Musa × paradisiaca var. dorsata G.Forst.; Musa rectispica Nakai; Musa seemannii F.Muell.; Musa troglodytarum var. acutibracteata MacDan.; Musa uranoscopos Colla, nom. illeg.; Musa uranoscopus Seem., sensu auct.

= Fe'i banana =

Fe'i bananas

Banana cultivars

Fe'i bananas (also spelt Fehi or Féi) are cultivated plants in the genus Musa, used mainly for their fruit. They are very distinct in appearance and origin from the majority of bananas and plantains currently grown. Found mainly in the islands of the Pacific, particularly French Polynesia, Fe'i bananas have skins which are brilliant orange to red in colour with yellow or orange flesh inside. They are usually eaten cooked and have been an important food for Pacific Islanders, moving with them as they migrated across the ocean. Most are high in β-carotene (a precursor of vitamin A).

The botanical name for Fe'i bananas is Musa troglodytarum L. Its origin is uncertain and it may be a hybrid.

== Description ==
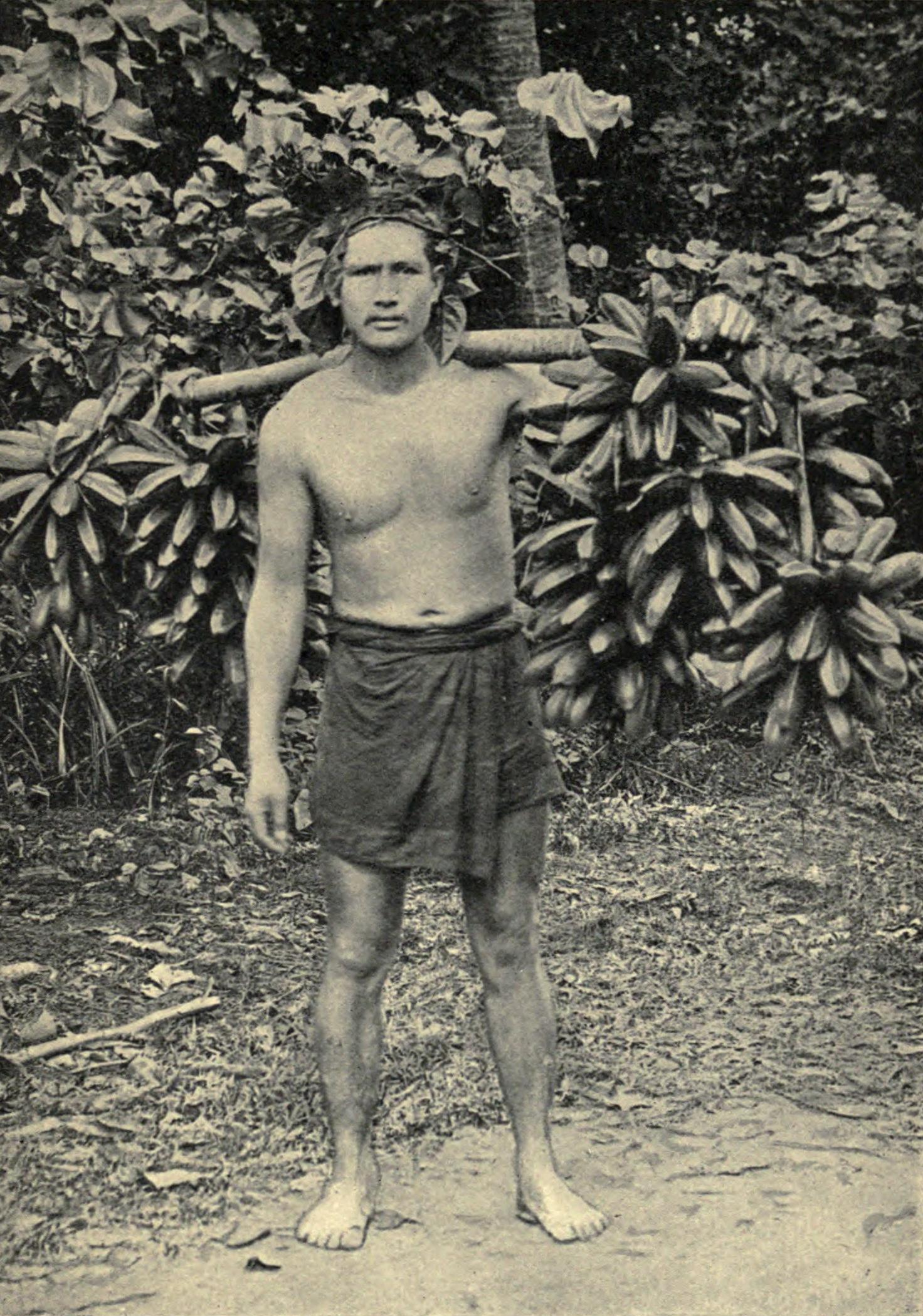
Pre-1906 photograph titled "Hillsman carrying feis to Papeete" (Tahiti)

Fe'i bananas are cultivated varieties (cultivars), rather than wild forms. They are distinctly different from the much more common bananas and plantains derived from Musa acuminata and Musa balbisiana. All members of the genus Musa are tall herbaceous plants, typically around 3–10 m (10–33 ft) tall or even more. Although they appear tree-like, the "trunk" is actually a pseudostem, formed from the tightly wrapped bases of the leaves. At maturity each pseudostem produces a single flowering stem that grows up inside it, eventually emerging from the top. As it elongates, female flowers appear which go on to form fruit – the bananas. Finally male flowers are produced. In cultivated bananas, the fruit is usually seedless and the male flowers sterile.

Fe'i bananas can be distinguished from other kinds of cultivated bananas and plantains in a number of ways. They have highly coloured sap, pink through to bright magenta and dark purple. The bracts of the flowering spike (inflorescence) are bright shiny green rather than dull red or purple. The flowering and fruiting stem is more or less upright (rather than drooping), so that the bunches of bananas are also upright. Ripe fruit has brilliant orange, copper-coloured or red skin with orange or yellow flesh inside. It has prominent ridges, making it squarish in cross-section.

== Taxonomy ==
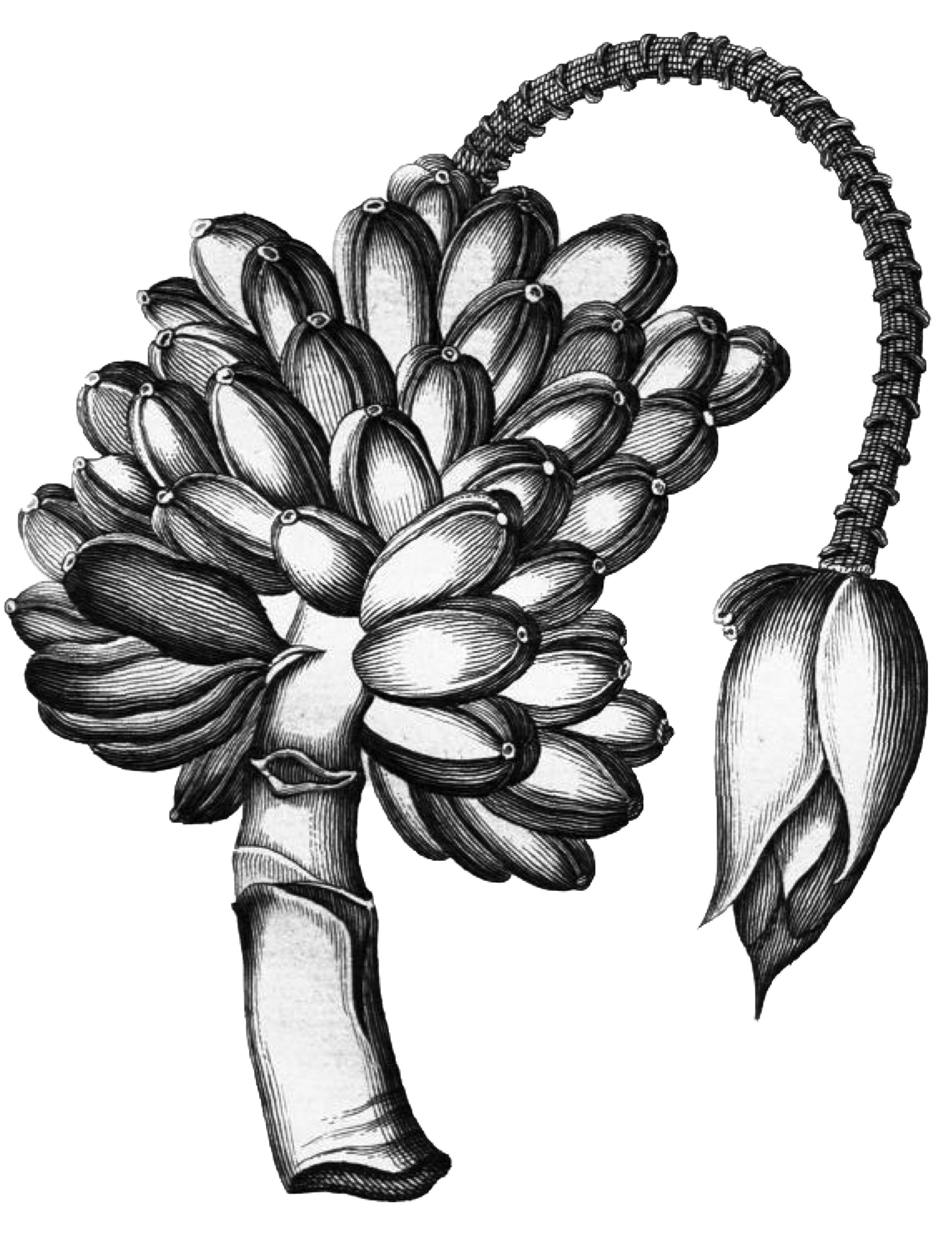
"Musa Uranoscopos" – the lectotype of Musa troglodytarum L.; from Rumphius (1747), Herbarium amboinensis, tab. 61

As with many names in the genus Musa, considerable confusion has existed as to the proper botanical name, if any, for Fe'i bananas. Some authorities have preferred to treat Fe'i bananas as a formal or informal cultivar group rather than employing a Latin binomial, using names like Musa (Fe'i Group) 'Utafan'.

One of the earliest detailed accounts of the genus Musa was by the German-Dutch botanist Georg E. Rumpf (c.1627–1702), usually known by the Latinized name Rumphius. His Herbarium amboinensis was published in 1747, after his death. His figure and description of a "species" under the name "Musa Uranoscopos" (meaning "heaven-looking banana") is consistent with a Fe'i banana; he refers to the upright flowering spike (although the figure, reproduced here, shows the terminal bud drooping), the coloured sap, and the effect of consumption on urine.

However, the starting point for botanical names is the publication of Carl Linnaeus' Species Plantarum in 1753, so "Musa uranoscopos" is not an acceptable name. In the second edition of Species Plantarum, Linnaeus lumped together Rumphius' Musa uranoscopos and Musa 'Pissang Batu' under the name Musa troglodytarum, in spite of the fact that Rumphius had noted several distinctions between the two. Linnaeus' treatment has been described as "beyond understanding". In 1917, Merrill designated the illustration of Rumphius' Musa uranoscopos as the lectotype of Musa troglodytarum L. On this basis, Häkkinen, Väre and Christenhusz concluded in 2012 that "all Fe'i cultivars, including those featured in Paul Gauguin's famous paintings, should be treated under the name M. troglodytarum L." Other sources also accept this as the scientific name for the group as a whole – for example Rafaël Govaerts in 2004. The name is sometimes written as M. × troglodytarum, although its hybrid origin is uncertain.

Synonyms of M. troglodytarum are:

- "M. uranoscopos" Rumphius (1747) – published before 1753, so not an acceptable name
- M. uranoscopos Lour. (1790) – a superfluous name because it was provided as an alternative name to Linnaeus', hence illegitimate; Loureiro's description is based on a different plant, M. coccinea
- M. uranoscopos Colla (1820) – superfluous and hence illegitimate
- M. uranoscopos Mig. (1855) – superfluous and hence illegitimate
- M. uranoscopos Seem. (1868) – superfluous and hence illegitimate
- M. seemannii Mueller (1875) – superfluous and hence illegitimate
- M. fehi Bertero ex Vieillard (1862)

Whereas most cultivated bananas and plantains are derived from species in Musa section Musa, Fe'i bananas are clearly part of section Callimusa (in particular the species formerly grouped as section Australimusa). However, their precise origins are unclear. On the basis of appearance (morphology), Musa maclayi, native to Papua New Guinea, has been proposed as a parent. More recent genetic studies suggest they are close to M. lolodensis and M. peekelii, both from New Guinea and neighbouring islands. Fe'i bananas may be hybrids between several different wild species. They are generally considered to have originated in New Guinea and then to have been spread eastwards and northwards (as far as the Hawaiian Islands) for use as food.

A few cultivars have been found which appear to be intermediate between Fe'i bananas and the more common Musa section Musa bananas and plantains. Although the part of the stem holding the fruit is upright, the rest of the stem then bends over so that the terminal bud faces sideways or downwards. An example is the cultivar 'Tati'a' from Tahiti. Molecular analysis of bananas with this growth habit from Papua New Guinea has shown evidence of genetic input from M. acuminata and M. balbisiana, the parents of the section Musa cultivars. Rumphius' illustration of his "Musa uranoscopos" shows the same morphology, although this might be artistic license.

== Distribution ==
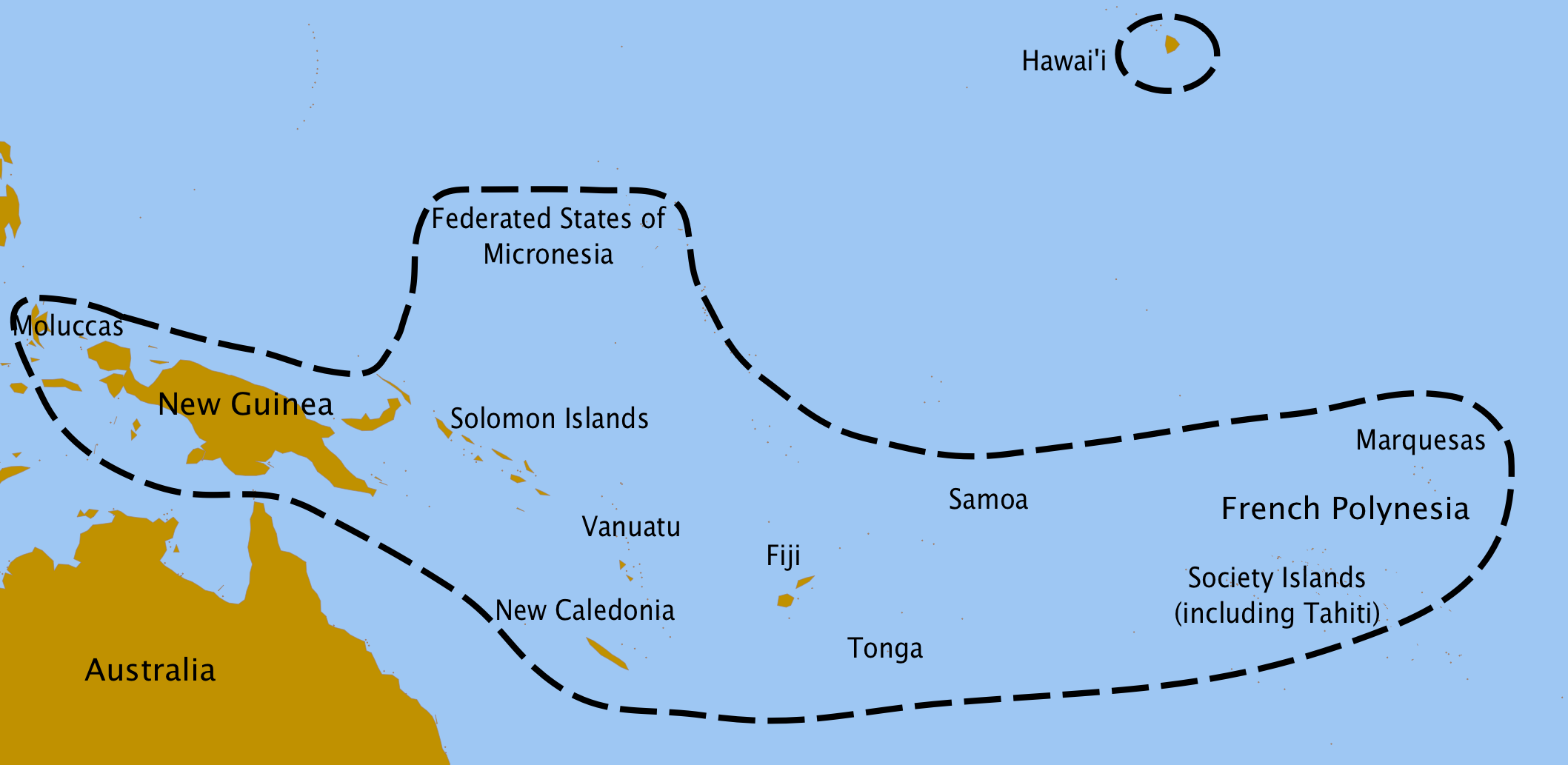
The dashed lines show the region in which Fe'i bananas are found and where they have, at least historically, been used as food. (Note: The map is based on Sharrock (2001, p. 3) with the Federated States of Micronesia added based on Englberger (2003).)

Fe'i bananas are mainly found from the Maluku Islands (Moluccas) in the west to French Polynesia in the east, particularly the Society Islands and the Marquesas Islands. They have been important both as a staple and as a ceremonial food, although their cultivation and use has sharply declined in recent decades. As the Pacific Islanders spread by canoe throughout the Pacific, they took Fe'i bananas with them; cultivation has been traced back to around 250 BC in the Marquesas and to around 800 AD in Tahiti in the Society Islands. They are believed to have originated in the New Guinea area, where cultivars with seeds occur, as do the wild species from which they are thought to be descended.

== Cultivars ==
Fe'i bananas are not in commercial cultivation. There are lists of cultivars for different islands, but it is not clear whether these are synonyms, with the same cultivar being known by different names in different locations and languages. Further, it is not clear whether local names apply to cultivars (i.e. distinct cultivated varieties) or to broader groups. Thus Ploetz et al. refer to a banana found in eastern Indonesia by the cultivar name 'Pisang Tongkat Langit'. However, pisang tongkat langit can be translated as "sky stick banana" or "heaven cane banana", corresponding to Rumphius' name Musa uranoscopos (heaven-gazing banana). Pisang tongkat langit is treated by other sources as referring to M. troglodytarum as a whole rather than to a single cultivar. Significant genetic variation has been reported among bananas from Maluku Islands for which this name is used.

The list below is selective; where many names are given in sources, it concentrates on those with the most description available.

- Federated States of Micronesia, particularly Pohnpei:

Karat type cultivars
- 'Karat Kole' or 'Karat Pwono' – round-shaped banana, flesh orange-yellow
- 'Karat Pako' – longer banana, skin rough, flesh orange-yellow
- 'Karat Pwekhu' – smaller banana, flesh orange-yellow
Utin Iap type cultivars
- 'Utin Iap' or 'Uht En Yap' – cone-shaped bunch, small bananas, flesh orange
- 'Utimwas' – small bananas, flesh orange

- Solomon Islands:
  - 'Aibwo' or 'Suria' – ripe skin orange; flesh yellow-orange
  - 'Fagufagu' – ripe skin orange, flesh yellow-orange
  - 'Gatagata' or 'Vudito' – ripe skin orange-brown, flesh yellow-orange
  - 'Toraka Parao' – ripe skin red; flesh yellow-orange
  - 'Warowaro' – ripe skin brown; flesh yellow
- Indonesia:
  - 'Pisang Tongkat Langit' or 'Pisang Ranggap'
- Papua New Guinea:
  - 'Menei', 'Rimina', 'Utafan', 'Sar', 'Wain'
- New Caledonia:
  - 'Daak'
- Fiji:
  - 'Soaqa'
- Society Islands:
  - 'Fe'i Aiuri', 'Fe'i Tatia'
- Hawai'i:
  - 'Borabora', 'Polapola', 'Mai'a Ha'i'

== Use ==
=== Culinary use ===
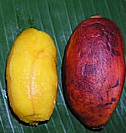
Peeled and unpeeled Karat bananas

Fe'i bananas are generally eaten as "plantains", i.e. they are usually cooked rather than eaten raw. They have been described as "delicious and nutritious when baked or boiled, especially if the slices are swathed in fresh coconut cream." They have also been described as "unpleasantly astringent" unless cooked, having higher proportions of starch and lower proportions of sugar than other kinds of banana. However, in the Federated States of Micronesia, some cultivars, particularly 'Karat Pwehu', 'Karat Pako' and to a lesser extent 'Utin Iap' (='Uht En Yap'), are commonly eaten raw when fully ripe. Karat bananas have a soft texture and a sweet taste and were a traditional weaning food in the Micronesian island of Pohnpei.

In countries where Fe'i bananas were once a major food item, there has been a shift away from eating traditional foods towards eating imported foods. Bananas with whiter flesh are preferred over traditional varieties with deeply coloured flesh. One issue with Fe'i bananas is that eating them causes the production of yellow coloured urine, thought to be caused by the excretion of excess riboflavin present in the fruit. This effect led people to believe that Fe'i bananas might not be safe to eat, particularly for children. Along with the shift away from traditional foods, there has been a rise in vitamin A deficiency. Fe'i bananas with deeper coloured flesh have been shown to contain high levels of beta-carotene, a precursor of vitamin A. A year-long promotional campaign in Pohnpei in 1999 to encourage the consumption of Karat cultivars had some success in increasing sales.

Levels of beta-carotene vary considerably among Fe'i bananas. In a study of traditional Solomon Islands cultivars, the highest level of beta-carotene found in a Fe'i cultivar was almost 6,000 μg per 100 g of flesh compared to the highest level of 1,300 μg in a non-Fe'i cultivar. However, there was an overlap; some Fe'i cultivars contained less beta-carotene than non-Fe'i cultivars.

=== Other uses ===
Fe'i banana plants have many other uses. Like other kinds of banana, the leaves may be used as plates or containers for cooked food. They can also be used as a roofing material, particularly for temporary huts. The fibres of the midrib of the leaves can be used to make ropes, often used to carry bunches of bananas. Other fibrous parts of the leaves can be dried and plaited into mats and similar items. The pseudostems are buoyant, and so can be used to make temporary rafts.

Fe'i bananas have distinctive reddish sap which does not readily fade on exposure to light. It is used as a dye, and has also been used to make ink.

== Historical reports ==
The early European explorers of the Pacific islands produced a few accounts of Fe'i bananas. In 1768, Daniel Solander accompanied Joseph Banks on James Cook's first voyage to the Pacific Ocean aboard the Endeavour. In the account he published later, he noted five kinds of banana or plantain called "Fe'i" by the Tahitians. William Ellis lived in the Society Islands in the 1850s. He refers to the name "Fe'i", saying that Fe'i bananas were the principal food for the inhabitants of some islands. He also noted that Fe'i banana plants have an upright fruit cluster.

Charles Darwin visited Tahiti in the Society Islands in 1835 and gave an account in The Voyage of the Beagle. Although he does not mention the name "Fe'i", he does speak of the "mountain-banana": "On each side of the ravine there were great beds of the mountain-banana, covered with ripe fruit. Many of these plants were from twenty to twenty-five feet high, and from three to four in circumference." Fe'i bananas have been noted to grow best in Tahiti on slopes at the base of cliffs.

Laurence H. MacDaniels published a study of the Fe'i banana in 1947. He reported that Fe'i bananas were the staple carbohydrate food of the Society Islanders, and that more than 95% of the bananas on sale were of the Fe'i type. Although some Fe'i banana plants were found in gardens, most bananas were gathered from the "wild", thought to have been planted in the past and abandoned.

== In culture ==
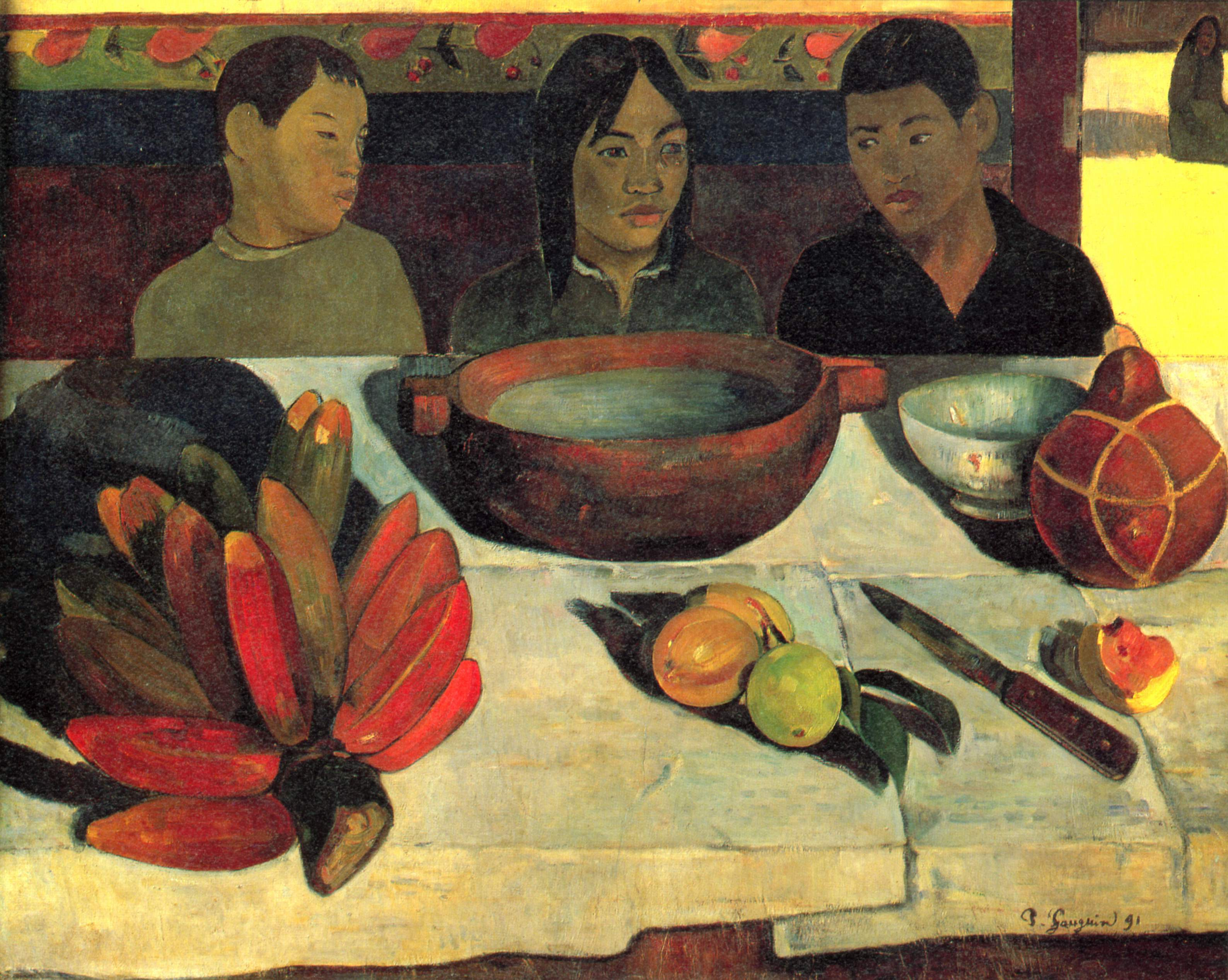
Paul Gauguin's Le Repas; Fe'i bananas bottom left

Fe'i bananas are an important component of ceremonial feasts in the Marquesas and the Society Islands. Karat bananas are reported to be one of the few kinds of banana that can be used in ceremonial presentations in Pohnpei, Micronesia. A Samoan legend is that the mountain banana and the lowland banana fought. The mountain banana – the Fe'i banana – won. Filled with pride at its victory, the mountain banana raised its head high, whereas the defeated lowland banana never raised its head again. (Fe'i bananas have an upright fruiting stem, whereas the fruiting stem droops in other kinds of banana.)

The bright orange-red colours of Fe'i bananas make them attractive to artists. The French Post-Impressionist painter Paul Gauguin visited the Society Islands, including Tahiti, towards the end of the 19th century. Three of his works include what are considered to be Fe'i bananas: Le Repas (The Meal, 1891), La Orana Maria (Hail Mary, 1891) and Paysage de Tahiti (Tahitian Landscape, 1891 (Note: There are several paintings by Gauguin with similar titles. Although Sharrock (2001) gives the date as 1892, it is the painting of 1891 that shows a man apparently carrying orange bananas. See Tahitian Landscape, 1891, The Web Gallery of Impressionism.)).

Fe'i bananas were one of the main staples of Liv Coucheron-Torpand and Thor Heyerdahl during their one-and-a-half-year stay on the Marquesan island of Fatu-Hiva in 1937–38. Heyerdahl reported that Fe'i bananas grew all around their cabin on Fatu-Hiva, while on Tahiti they had only seen Fe'i bananas growing "in almost inaccessible cliffs."

== Conservation ==
Fe'i banana cultivars, along with other Pacific crop propagation material, have been saved at the Centre for Pacific Crops and Trees (CePaCT), which catalogs living plants of the Pacific region for conservation. More than 100 samples of Fe'i bananas were collected in French Polynesia, from isolated farms on six different islands. The samples will be conserved in a gene bank in Tahiti, with duplicates kept at CePaCt.

== See also ==
- Domesticated plants and animals of Austronesia
