= Musa peekelii =

Conservation status
- Least Concern (IUCN 3.1)

Scientific classification
- Kingdom: Plantae
- Clade: Embryophytes
- Clade: Tracheophytes
- Clade: Spermatophytes
- Clade: Angiosperms
- Clade: Monocots
- Clade: Commelinids
- Order: Zingiberales
- Family: Musaceae
- Genus: Musa
- Section: Musa sect. Callimusa
- Species: M. peekelii

Binomial name
- Musa peekelii Lauterb.

Subspecies
- Musa peekelii subsp. peekelii (autonym); M. p. subsp. angustigemma (N.W.Simmonds) Argent

Synonyms
- Musa angustigemma N.W.Simmonds [=M. peekelii subsp. angustigemma]

Species of flowering plant

Musa peekelii is a species of wild banana (genus Musa), native to eastern New Guinea and the Bismarck Archipelago. It is placed in section Callimusa (now including the former section Australimusa), members of which have a diploid chromosome number of 2n = 20. It is a very tall plant, reaching over 10 m (33 ft), with a narrow green drooping bud. The ripe bananas are red with bright yellow flesh. It is one of the possible parents of the cultivated Fe'i bananas.

The subspecies M. peekelii subsp. angustigemma has been treated as a separate species, M. angustigemma.
