= Cliff Park Brook =

Location
- Country: United States
- State: New York

Physical characteristics
- Mouth: Cayuga Inlet
  - location: Ithaca, New York, United States
  - coordinates: 42°26′28″N 76°30′57″W
- Basin size: .33 mi^{2} (0.85 km^{2})

Cliff Park Brook is a river located in Tompkins County, New York. It flows into Cayuga Inlet by Ithaca, New York.
