= Linderman Creek =

River in the United States of America

Location
- Country: United States
- State: New York

Physical characteristics
- Source
  - coordinates: 42°27′1.00″N 76°32′12.00″W
- Mouth: Cayuga Inlet
  - location: Ithaca, New York, United States
  - coordinates: 42°27′7.26″N 76°30′41.79″W

Linderman Creek is a river located in Tompkins County, New York. It flows into Cayuga Inlet by Ithaca, New York.
