= Lick Brook =

Location
- Country: United States
- State: New York

Physical characteristics
- Mouth: Cayuga Inlet
  - location: Ithaca, New York, United States
  - coordinates: 42°24′00″N 76°32′30″W
- Basin size: 1.56 mi^{2} (4.0 km^{2})

Lick Brook is a small stream located in Tompkins County, New York. It flows into Cayuga Inlet south of Ithaca, New York.
