= Buttermilk Creek (Lambton County) =

- Location of the mouth of Buttermilk Creek in southern Ontario

Location
- Country: Canada
- Province: Ontario
- Region: Southwestern Ontario
- County: Lambton
- Town: Petrolia

Physical characteristics
- Source: Field
  - coordinates: 42°54′09″N 82°09′04″W
  - elevation: 203 m (666 ft)
- Mouth: Stonehouse Drain
  - coordinates: 42°52′33″N 82°10′56″W
  - elevation: 197 m (646 ft)
- Length: 5 km (3.1 mi)

Basin features
- River system: Great Lakes Basin

Buttermilk Creek is a creek in the town of Petrolia, Lambton County, Ontario, Canada.

== Course ==
Buttermilk Creek begins in a field north of Petrolia and travels 5 kilometres (3.1 mi) through the northwest of the town before reaching its mouth at the Stonehouse Drain in Lorne C Henderson Conservation Area. The Stonehouse Drain flows via Bear Creek and the North Sydenham and Sydenham Rivers into Lake St. Clair.

Buttermilk Creek is part of the St. Clair Region Conservation Authority's Lower Bear Watershed.

== See also ==
- List of rivers of Ontario

== Sources ==
- "Buttermilk Creek". Geographical Names Data Base. Natural Resources Canada.
- "Toporama - Topographic Map Sheet 40J16". Atlas of Canada. Natural Resources Canada. Archived from the original on 2010-08-31.
