= Cayuga Inlet =

River in Tompkins County, New York, US

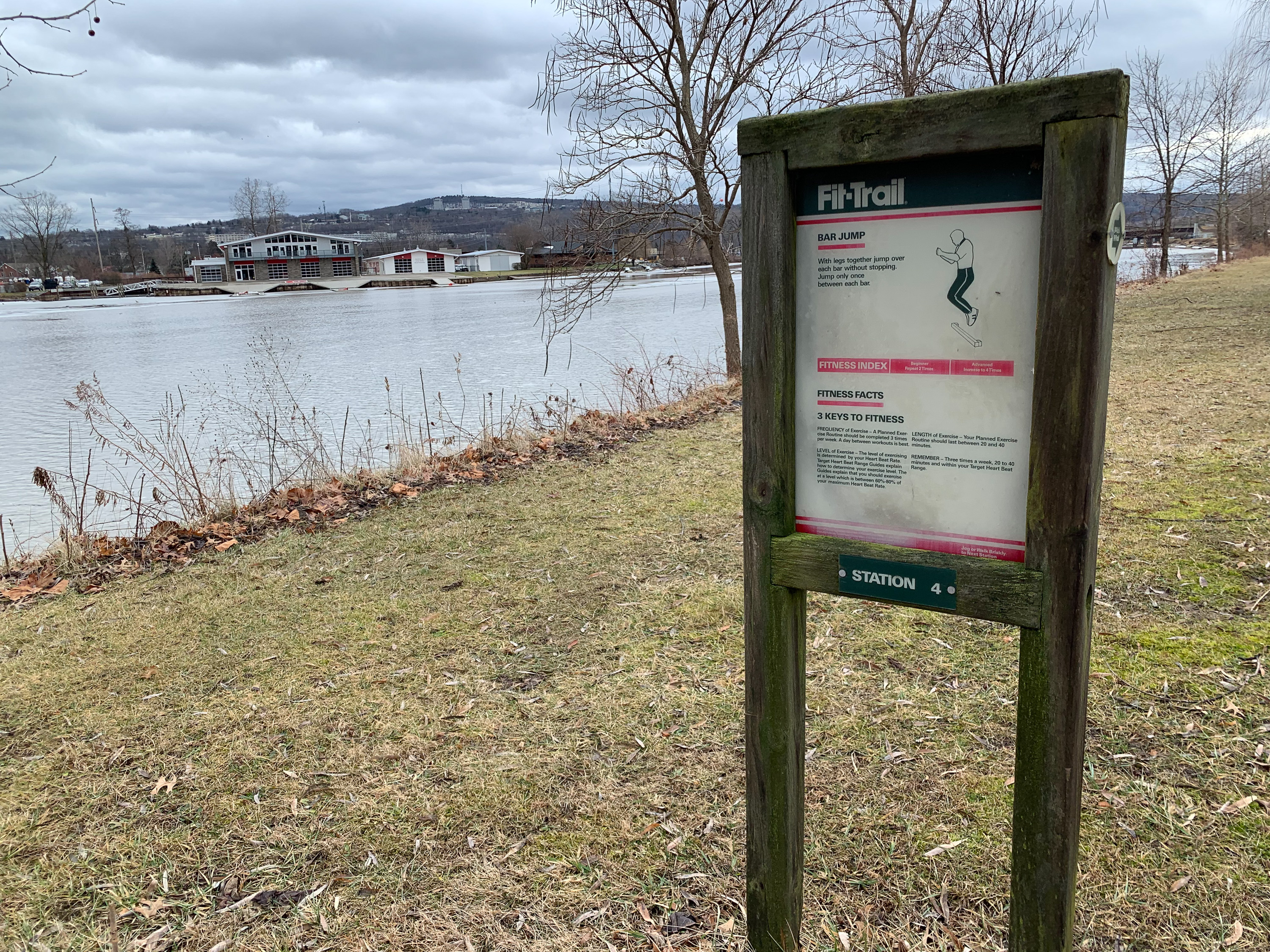
- A sign for the Cayuga Waterfront Trail in Cass Park, Ithaca, New York. The Collyer boathouse is visible across Cayuga Inlet.

Location
- Country: United States
- State: New York

Physical characteristics
- Source
  - location: West Danby, New York, United States
  - coordinates: 42°18′10″N 76°31′45″W
- Mouth: Cayuga Lake
  - location: Ithaca, New York, United States
  - coordinates: 42°27′34″N 76°30′44″W
  - elevation: 381 ft (116 m)
- Basin size: 143 mi^{2} (370 km^{2})

Basin features
- Tributaries
  - left: Vanbuskirk Gulf, West Branch Cayuga Inlet, Enfield Creek, Coy Glen, Cliff Park Brook, Linderman Creek
  - right: Lick Brook, Buttermilk Creek, Six Mile Creek, Cascadilla Creek

Cayuga Inlet is a river located in Tompkins County, New York. It flows into the south end of Cayuga Lake by Ithaca, New York.

== Development ==
Cayuga Inlet is a popular and well-connected location for boating. Boaters are able to travel from Cayuga Inlet via the Erie Canal and Saint Lawrence Seaway to the Atlantic Ocean, or follow Lake Erie to the Mississippi River and the Gulf of Mexico. Because of this, waterfront property values are high.

The area surrounding Cayuga Inlet includes:

- 347 acres of parkland and open space
- Six restaurants and bars
- A spa and health club
- Four facilities which cater to nonmotorized boating (Cornell and Ithaca College crew facilities, a kayak rental business, and Cascadilla Boat Club)
- Ithaca Farmers Market
- Ithaca Dragonboat Club
- Allan H. Treman Marine State park
- Festivals and events such as Water Music and Rhiner Festival

== Recreational uses ==
Boathouses

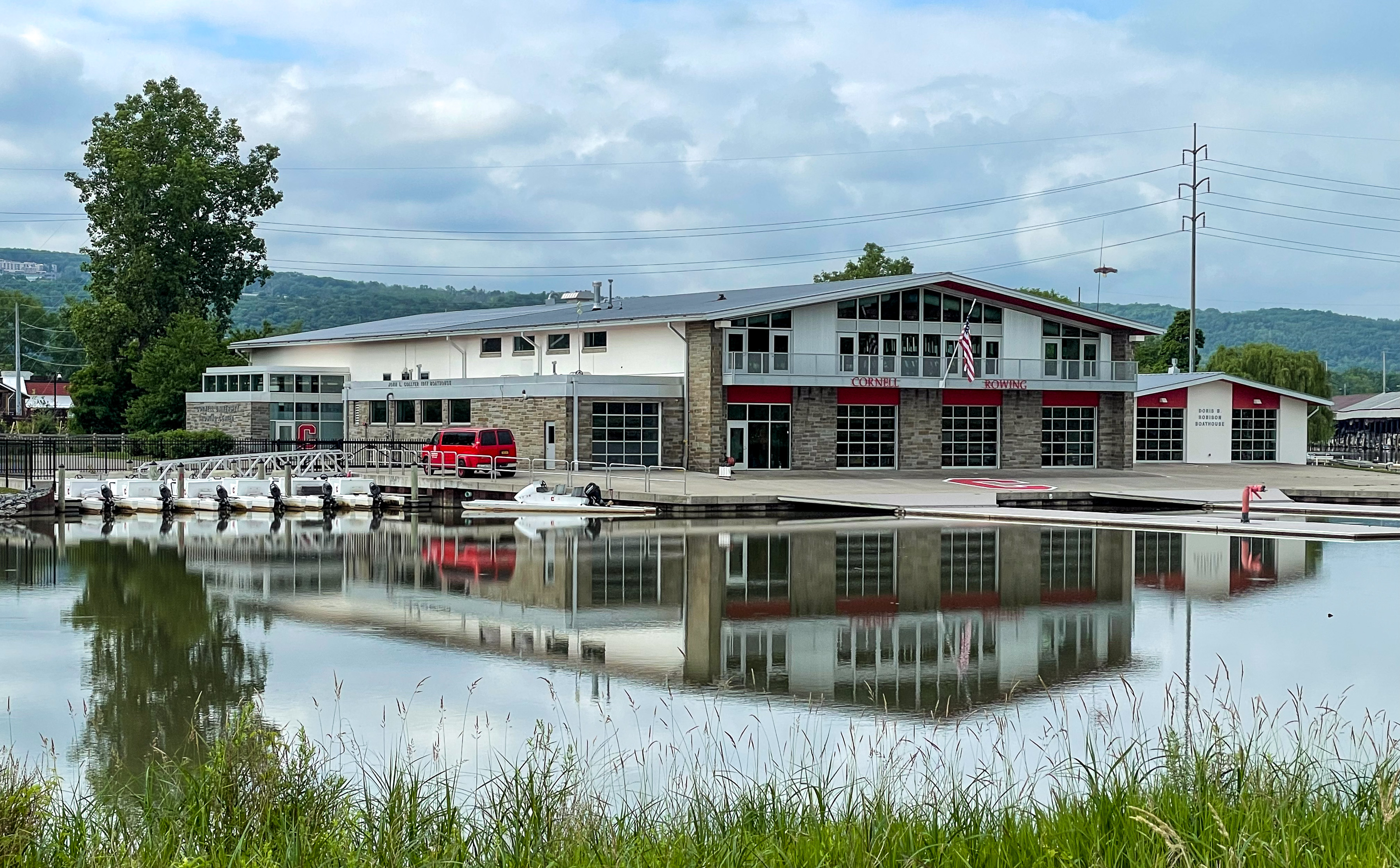
Collyer Boathouse

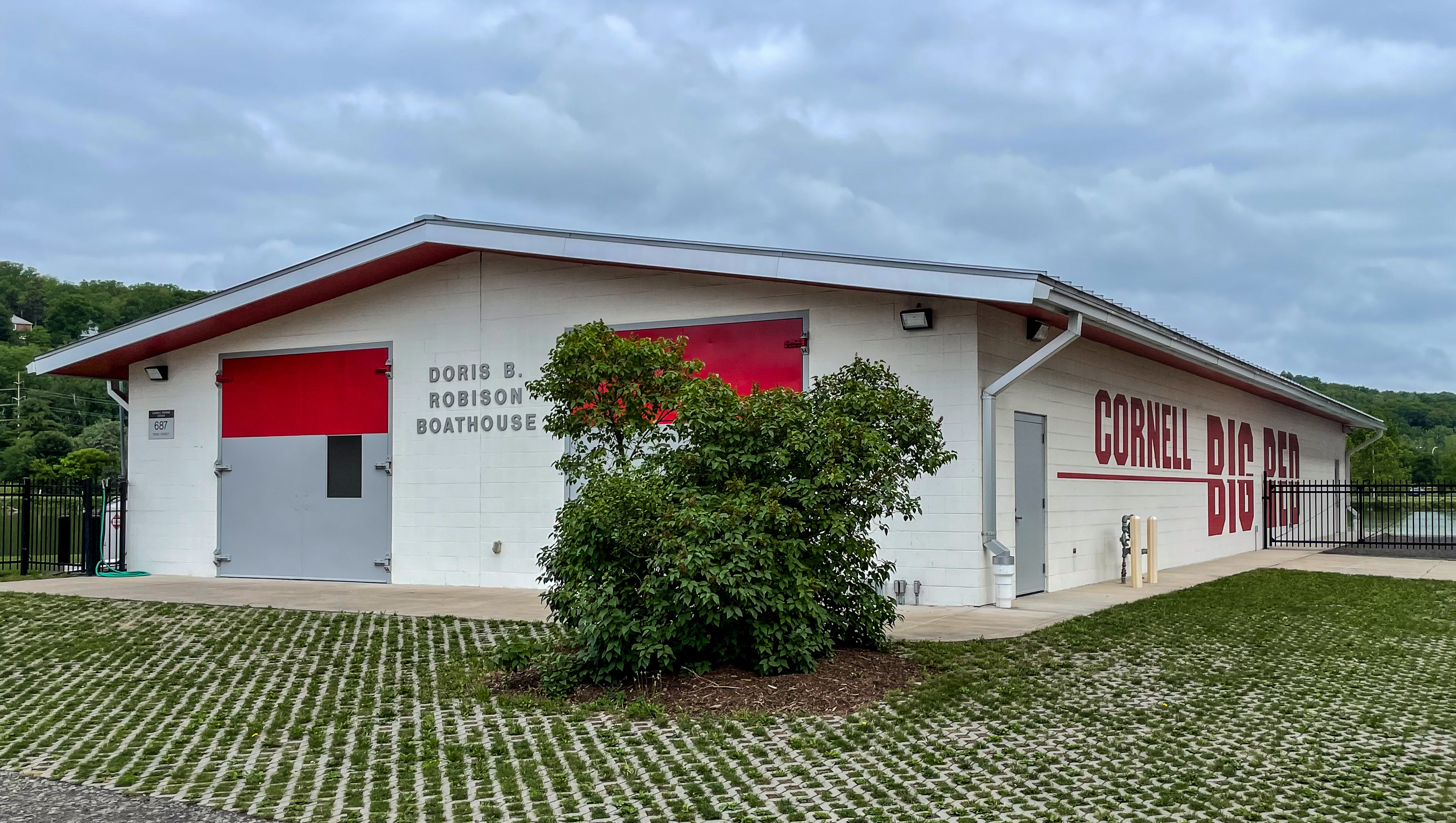
Doris Robison Boathouse

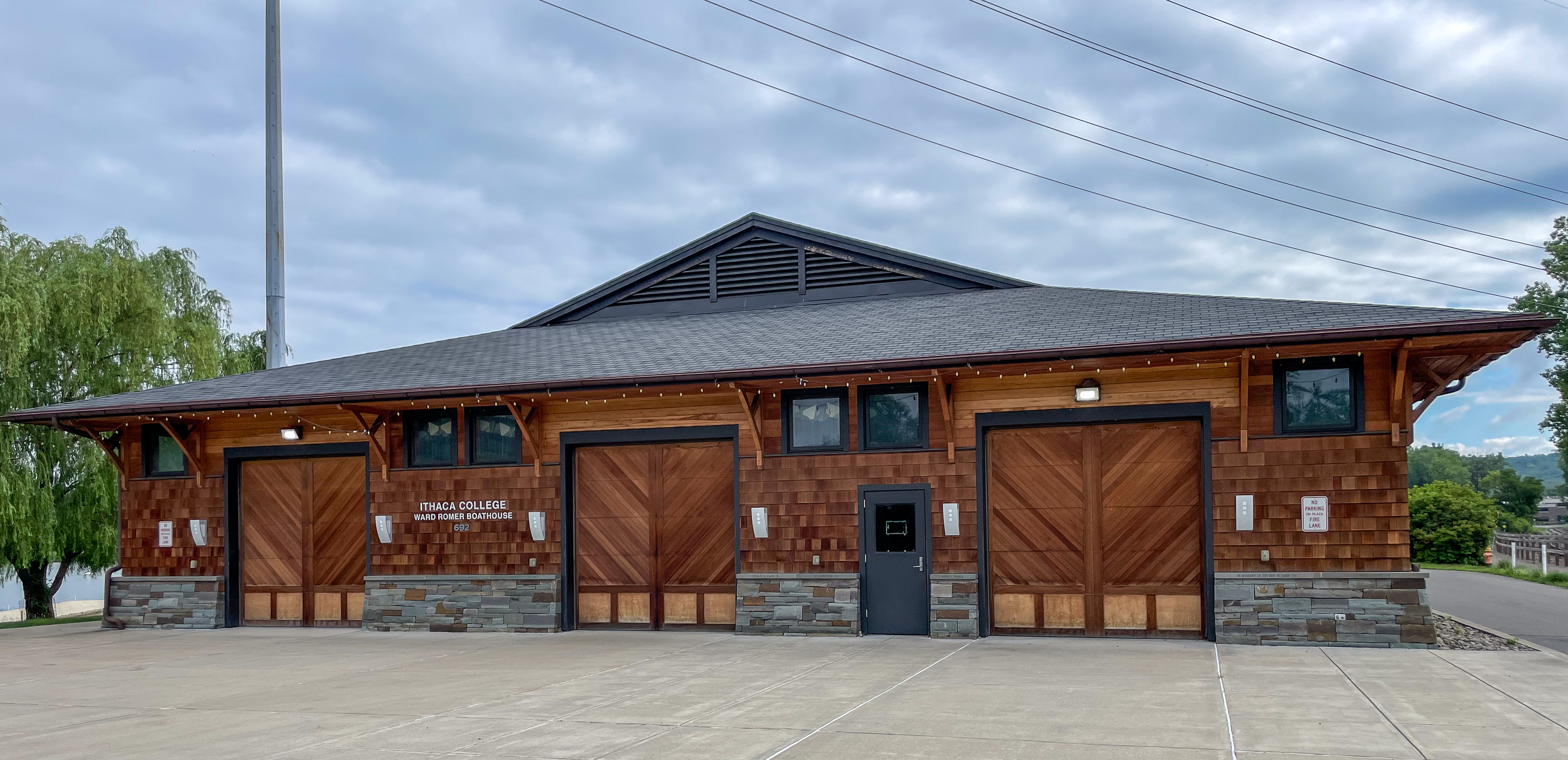
Ward Romer Boathouse

Cass Park is located along Cayuga Inlet. The Cayuga Waterfront Trail is a 5.5-mile (8.9 km) multi-use trail which runs through Cass Park along the banks of Cayuga Inlet. The trail connects joggers and cyclists to Stewart Park, the Farmer's Market, Newman Golf Course, and other destinations in the area.

Cornell University's Collyer Boathouse (men's rowing) and Doris Robison Boathouse (women's rowing) are located on the east bank of the Cayuga Inlet, just north of where Six Mile Creek drains into the inlet.

Ithaca College's Haskell Davidson Boathouse was built on Cayuga Inlet in 1974 and housed 16 rowers and two boats. As the college grew, a new boathouse was needed. The Davidson Boathouse was razed in September 2011, and the new 8,500-square-foot (790 m^{2}) Ward Romer Boathouse, centerpiece of the Robert B. Tallman Rowing Center, was dedicated on November 3, 2012.

== Ecology ==
Hydrilla verticillata, a highly invasive species also known as water thyme, was detected in the Cayuga Inlet in August 2011. It had not been found in Cayuga Lake. A project began in 2012-2013 to eradicate hydrilla from the inlet.
