= Laurence Howland MacDaniels =

- Born: 1888
- Died: 1986 (aged 97–98)
- Scientific career
- Fields: Botany, Horticulture
- Author abbrev. (botany): MacDan.

Laurence Howland MacDaniels (1888–1986) was an American botanist and horticulturalist. In 1926–1927, he carried out research on the Fe'i banana and its relationship to Polynesian migrations, which was published in 1947 by the Bishop Museum of Honolulu.
