= Buttermilk Creek (Cayuga Inlet) =

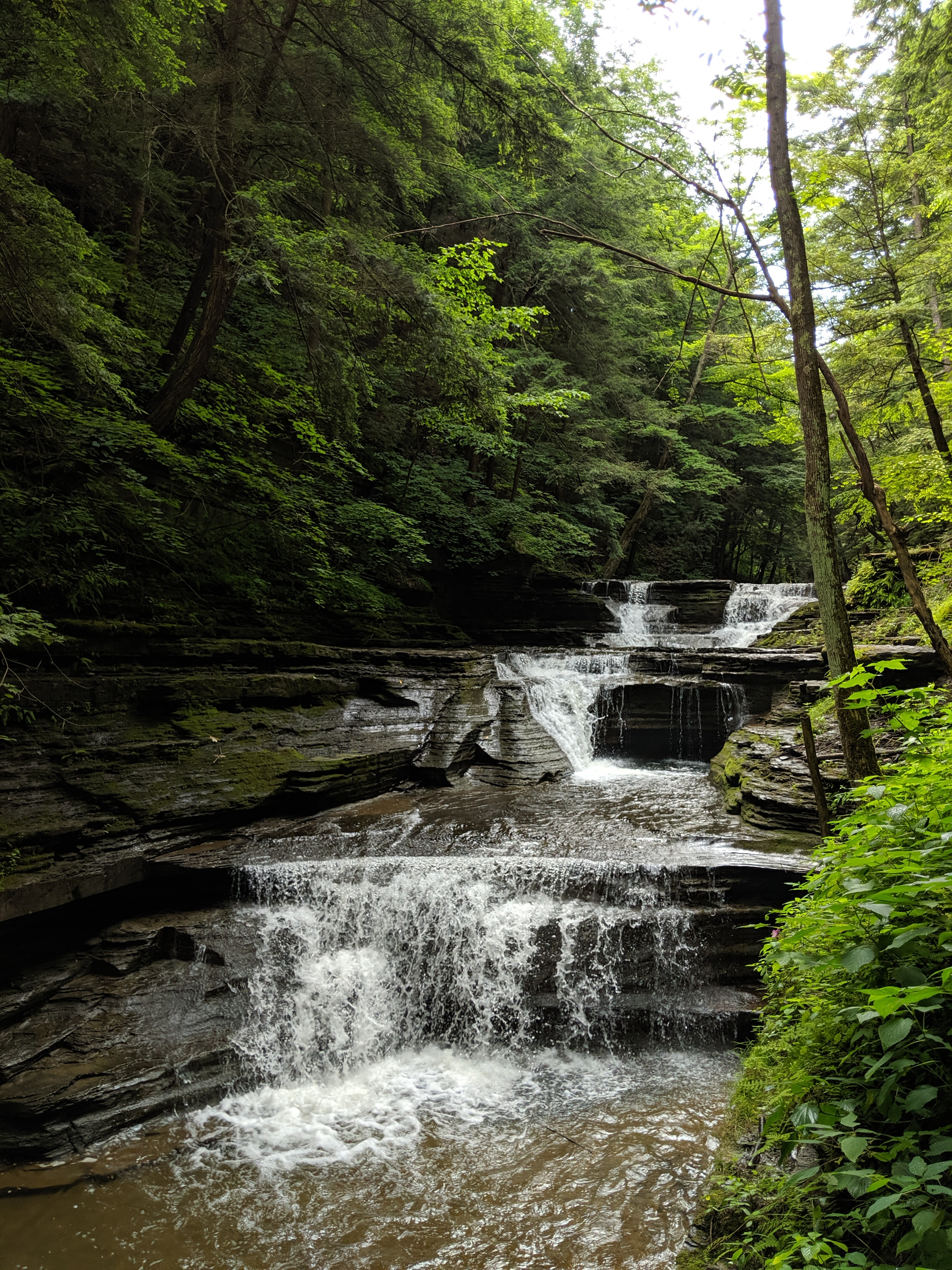

Location
- Country: United States
- State: New York

Physical characteristics
- Mouth: Cayuga Inlet
  - location: Ithaca, New York, United States
  - coordinates: 42°25′06″N 76°31′37″W
- Basin size: 12.1 mi^{2} (31 km^{2})

Buttermilk Creek is a river located in Tompkins County, New York. It flows into Cayuga Inlet by Ithaca, New York.
