= Six Mile Creek (Ithaca) =

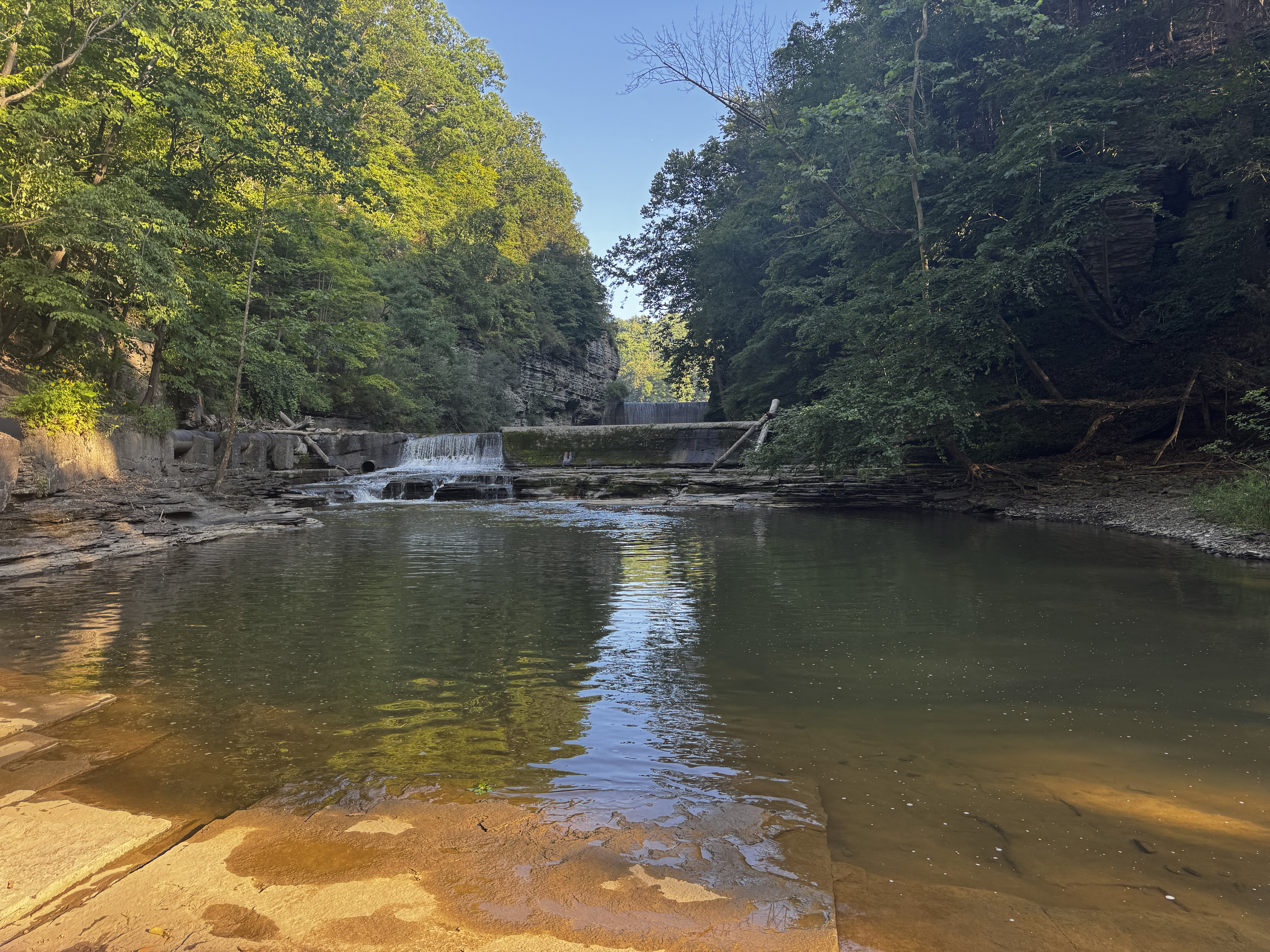
- Six Mile Creek below Second Dam

Location
- Country: United States
- State: New York
- County: Tompkins

Physical characteristics
- Source
  - location: Dryden, New York, United States
  - coordinates: 42°28′3″N 76°19′44″W
- Mouth: Cayuga Inlet
  - location: Ithaca, New York, United States
  - coordinates: 42°26′47″N 76°30′43″W
  - elevation: 117 m (384 ft)
- Length: 20 mi (32 km)
- Basin size: 49.6 mi^{2} (128 km^{2})

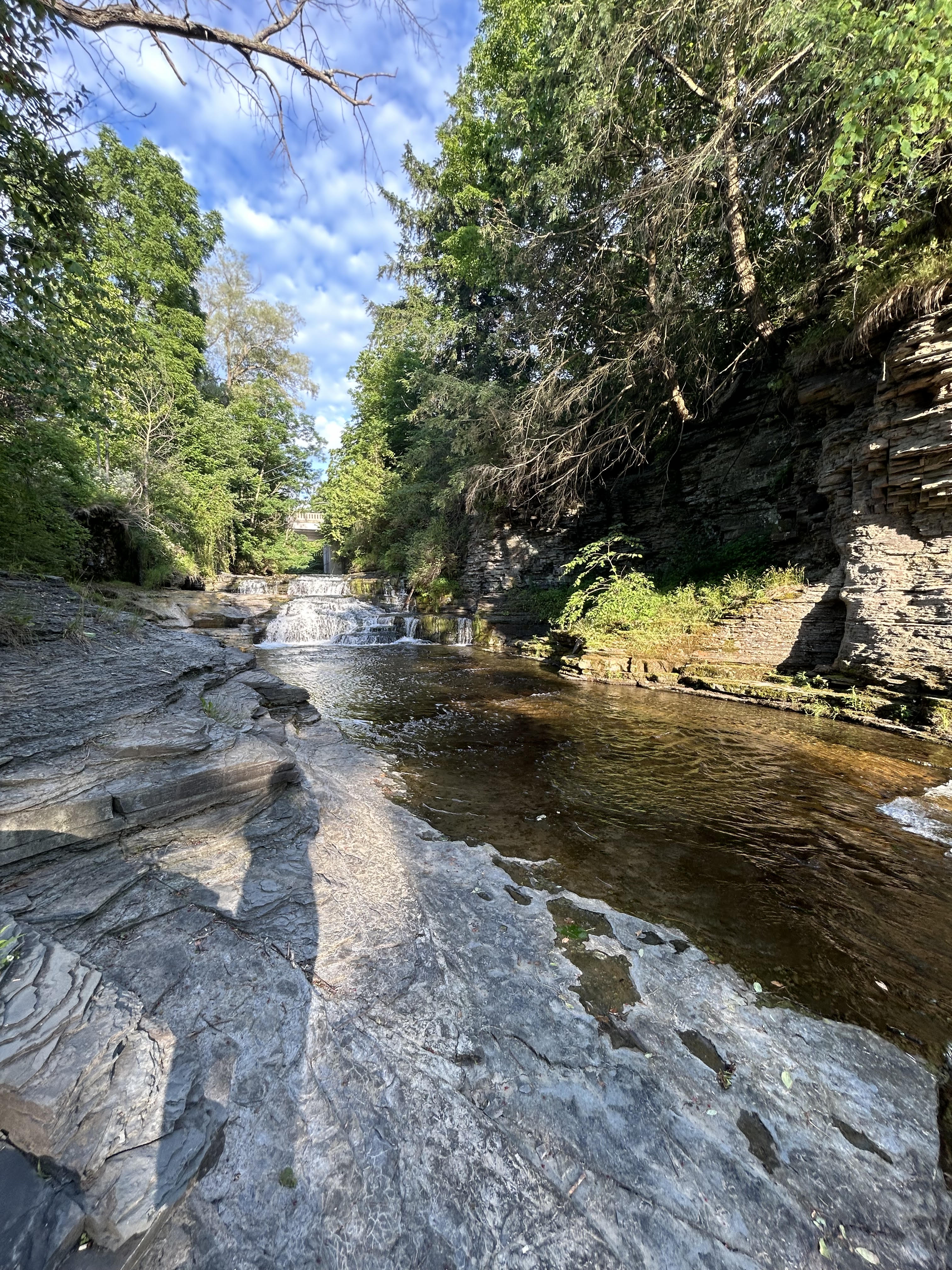
Six Mile Creek in Brooktondale, NY

Six Mile Creek is a 20-mile-long (32 km) creek in Tompkins County, New York. It originates in the Town of Dryden near the intersection of Irish Settlement Road (Tompkins County Highway 162A) and Card Road and drains into Cayuga Inlet, which flows into Cayuga Lake. Its watershed is the principal source of drinking water for the City of Ithaca, New York, and the surrounding communities.

The headwaters lie on private land between Yellow Barn State Forest to the northwest and Hammond Hill State Forest to the southeast. It then flows south into the Town of Caroline, flowing parallel to Six Hundred Road and then crossing beneath New York State Route 79 in Slaterville Springs, after which it turns west until Brooktondale. There it turns northwest entering the Town of Ithaca. From there, the flow is interrupted by a series of dams and then has its outlet at the Cayuga Inlet below the southern end of Cayuga Lake in the City of Ithaca.

== History ==
Glaciation advanced and retreated along the creek valley in the late Pleistocene Epoch until about 17,500 years ago. However, the exact details are debated. The main ice tongues split near modern-day Brooktondale, resulting in different hydrogeology between the upper valley, from the headwaters to Brooktondale, and the lower valley between Brooktondale and the outlet. Much of the upper valley is characterized by steep gorge walls. Because the lower valley was filled with sediments as the glaciers retreated, the new channel initially flowed without regard to its pre-glacial location. Over time, it washed away sediment filling pre-glacial gorges in some places, whereas in other reaches, it cut into the bedrock to create new post-glacial gorges. As the post-glacial gorges are narrower than the re-excavated pre-glacial gorges, the lower valley takes on the appearance of beads on a string.

The lower creek valley was a transportation route into Ithaca. The Cayuga people named the creek Teegastoweas. It was given its current name by English settlers, marking the distance from the crossing near Brooktondale to the trail junction at the Cascadilla crossing in Ithaca. Water flowing down the steep valley powered numerous sawmills in the area, and at least one grist mill, the Van Natta Mill in Ithaca.

Several dams were raised on the lower creek in the late 19th and early 20th centuries at each “bead” on the gorge. The mill dam above the Van Natta gristmill, known as First Dam or Van Natta's Dam, was purchased by the Ithaca Water and Light Company in 1892 to provide a drinking water supply for the city; the abandoned mill is still a prominent landmark. In 1902, the structure known as Second Dam or the 30-foot Dam was constructed upstream. A third dam, known as the 60-foot Dam, Third Dam, or Potters Fall Dam, was built in 1911. Finally, in 1925, a siltation trap, known as the Silt Dam, was built above the 60-foot Dam. The reservoir behind the 60-foot Dam, sometimes called Ithaca Reservoir, is a major water supply reservoir for the City of Ithaca. In 2010, the city approved a plan to refurbish the water treatment plant rather than join the Southern Cayuga Lake Inter-municipal Water Supply Commission, Bolton Point Water System.

The reservoir above Second Dam has become a popular swimming area, although technically illegal, raising concerns about noise, crime, littering, and safety. Although volunteer rangers patrol the area, they do not have the power to write tickets or make arrests and must contact the Tompkins County Sheriff for enforcement actions. In 2015, a man drowned in the reservoir behind Second Dam, prompting discussion about increasing targeted enforcement.
