= Newfield (CDP), New York =

Newfield, New York
- CDP
- Location within the state of New York
- Coordinates: 42°21′43″N 76°35′32″W
- Country: United States
- State: New York
- County: Tompkins
- Incorporated: 1895
- Dissolved: December 31, 1927

Area
  - Total: 1.26 sq mi (3.26 km^{2})
  - Land: 1.26 sq mi (3.26 km^{2})
  - Water: 0 sq mi (0.00 km^{2})

Population (2020)
  - Total: 725
  - Density: 576.6/sq mi (222.64/km^{2})
- Time zone: UTC-5 (Eastern (EST))
  - Summer (DST): UTC-4 (EDT)
- FIPS code: 36-50257

Newfield is a census-designated place (CDP) in Tompkins County, New York, United States. The population was 759 at the 2010 census.

Newfield Hamlet lies near the center of the town of Newfield and is located southwest of Ithaca.

It was incorporated as a village in 1895. On September 21, 1926, local residents voted in favor of dissolution. Final sale and transfer of assets and services to the Town of Newfield took place on March 21, 1927 when the Village of Newfield Board of Trustees held their last meeting. The village officially dissolved on December 31, 1927.

== Geography ==
Newfield Hamlet is located at 42°21′43″N 76°35′32″W (42.361957, -76.592094).

According to the United States Census Bureau, the CDP has a total area of 1.2 square miles (3.1 km^{2}), all land.

New York State Route 13, as Elmira Road, bypasses Newfield Hamlet.

== Demographics ==
Historical population
Census	Pop.	Note	%±
2020	725		—
U.S. Decennial Census

As of the census of 2000, there were 647 people, 294 households, and 169 families residing in the CDP. The population density was 518.5 inhabitants per square mile (200.2/km^{2}). There were 314 housing units at an average density of 251.6 per square mile (97.1/km^{2}). The racial makeup of the CDP was 96.60% White, 1.55% African American, 0.31% Native American, 0.46% from other races, and 1.08% from two or more races. Hispanic or Latino of any race were 1.39% of the population.

There were 294 households, out of which 28.2% had children under the age of 18 living with them, 45.6% were married couples living together, 9.2% had a female householder with no husband present, and 42.5% were non-families. 35.7% of all households were made up of individuals, and 16.3% had someone living alone who was 65 years of age or older. The average household size was 2.20 and the average family size was 2.87.

In the CDP, the population was spread out, with 22.9% under the age of 18, 7.1% from 18 to 24, 30.3% from 25 to 44, 25.0% from 45 to 64, and 14.7% who were 65 years of age or older. The median age was 40 years. For every 100 females, there were 89.7 males. For every 100 females age 18 and over, there were 81.5 males.

The median income for a household in the CDP was $43,056, and the median income for a family was $56,522. Males had a median income of $26,875 versus $35,236 for females. The per capita income for the CDP was $18,461. About 4.1% of families and 7.4% of the population were below the poverty line, including 5.3% of those under age 18 and 7.7% of those age 65 or over.

== Education ==
The CDP is in the Newfield Central School District.
