= H. melanoleuca =

H. melanoleuca may refer to:

- Heterophasia melanoleuca, a bird species
- Hypercompe melanoleuca, a moth species

== See also ==
- Melanoleuca (disambiguation)
