= L. melanoleuca =

L. melanoleuca may refer to:

- Lalage melanoleuca, a bird species endemic to the Philippines
- Lamprospiza melanoleuca, a small passerine bird species
- Leucosarcia melanoleuca, a pigeon species

== See also ==
- Melanoleuca (disambiguation)
