= Leopard moth =

Leopard Moth may refer to:

- Giant leopard moth, or Hypercompe scribonia
- Zeuzera pyrina, a member of the family Cossoidea
- De Havilland Leopard Moth, a 1933 three seat de Havilland plane
