= Testaptera =

Scientific classification
- Missing taxonomy template (fix): Testaptera

Type species
- Automolis testacea Rothschild, 1909

Genus of moths

Testaptera is a genus of tiger moths in the family Erebidae that was erected by Michel Laguerre in 2023. All of the species in the genus were split from the genus Hypercompe.

== Taxonomy ==
The following species are recognised in the genus Testaptera:

- Testaptera fuscescens (Rothschild, 1917)
- Testaptera pertestacea (Rothschild, 1935)
- Testaptera testacea (Rothschild, 1909)
- Testaptera turruptianoides (Rothschild, 1910)
