= Hypercompe mielkei =

Scientific classification
- Domain: Eukaryota
- Kingdom: Animalia
- Phylum: Arthropoda
- Class: Insecta
- Order: Lepidoptera
- Superfamily: Noctuoidea
- Family: Erebidae
- Subfamily: Arctiinae
- Genus: Hypercompe
- Species: H. mielkei

Binomial name
- Hypercompe mielkei Watson & Goodger, 1986

Synonyms
- Hypercompe mielkei Watson & Goodger, 1986; Ecpantheria testacea Rothschild, 1910 (preocc. Automolis testacea Rothschild, 1909)

Species of moth

Hypercompe mielkei is a moth of the family Erebidae first described by Watson and Goodger in 1986. It is found in Peru.
