= A. melanoleuca =

A. melanoleuca may refer to:

- Ailuropoda melanoleuca, the giant panda, a critically endangered mammal species found in China
- Amblystoma melanoleuca, a terrestrial salamander species

== See also ==
- Melanoleuca (disambiguation)
