= Hypsocompe =

Scientific classification
- Kingdom: Animalia
- Phylum: Arthropoda
- Clade: Pancrustacea
- Class: Insecta
- Order: Lepidoptera
- Superfamily: Noctuoidea
- Family: Erebidae
- Subfamily: Arctiinae
- Tribe: Arctiini
- Subtribe: Spilosomina
- Genus: Hypsocompe; Laguerre, 2023

Type species
- Leucarctia permaculata Packard, 1872

Genus of moths

Hypsocompe is a genus of tiger moths in the family Erebidae that was erected by French entomologist Michel Laguerre in 1883. Many of the species in the genus were split from the genus Hypercompe.

== Taxonomy ==
The following species are recognised in the genus Hypsocompe:

- Hypsocompe amulaensis (Druce, 1889)
- Hypsocompe andromela (Dyar, 1909)
- Hypsocompe atra (Oberthür, 1881)
- Hypsocompe extrema (Walker, 1855)
- Hypsocompe nubilus Laguerre, 2023
- Hypsocompe oaxaca Laguerre, 2023
- Hypsocompe permaculata (Packard, 1872)
- Hypsocompe quetzali Laguerre, 2023
- Hypsocompe tenebra (Schaus, 1894)
