= Hypercompe dubia =

Scientific classification
- Domain: Eukaryota
- Kingdom: Animalia
- Phylum: Arthropoda
- Class: Insecta
- Order: Lepidoptera
- Superfamily: Noctuoidea
- Family: Erebidae
- Subfamily: Arctiinae
- Genus: Hypercompe
- Species: H. dubia

Binomial name
- Hypercompe dubia (Rothschild, 1922)

Synonyms
- Ecpantheria dubia Rothschild, 1922

Species of moth

Hypercompe dubia is a moth of the family Erebidae first described by Walter Rothschild in 1922. It is found in Peru.
