= Hypercompe chelifer =

Scientific classification
- Kingdom: Animalia
- Phylum: Arthropoda
- Clade: Pancrustacea
- Class: Insecta
- Order: Lepidoptera
- Superfamily: Noctuoidea
- Family: Erebidae
- Subfamily: Arctiinae
- Genus: Hypercompe
- Species: H. chelifer

Binomial name
- Hypercompe chelifer (Forbes, 1929)

Synonyms
- Ecpantheria chelifer Forbes, 1929

Species of moth

Hypercompe chelifer is a moth of the family Erebidae first described by William Trowbridge Merrifield Forbes in 1929. It is found in Argentina.
