= Testaptera turruptianoides =

Scientific classification
- Kingdom: Animalia
- Phylum: Arthropoda
- Clade: Pancrustacea
- Class: Insecta
- Order: Lepidoptera
- Superfamily: Noctuoidea
- Family: Erebidae
- Subfamily: Arctiinae
- Genus: Testaptera
- Species: T. turruptianoides

Binomial name
- Testaptera turruptianoides (Rothschild, 1910)

Synonyms
- Automolis turruptianoides Rothschild, 1910; Hypercompe turruptianoides (Rothschild, 1910)

Species of moth

Testaptera turruptianoides is a species of tiger moth first described by Walter Rothschild in 1910. It is found in Brazil (Upper Amazons).
