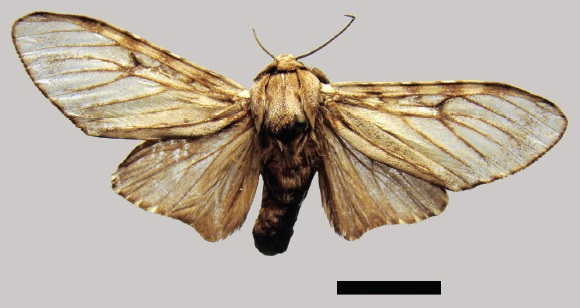

Scientific classification
- Kingdom: Animalia
- Phylum: Arthropoda
- Class: Insecta
- Order: Lepidoptera
- Superfamily: Noctuoidea
- Family: Erebidae
- Subfamily: Arctiinae
- Genus: Hypercompe
- Species: H. anomala

Binomial name
- Hypercompe anomala (Burmeister, 1883)

Synonyms
- Ecpantheria anomala Burmeister, 1883

= Hypercompe anomala =

Species of moth

Hypercompe anomala is a moth of the family Erebidae first described by Hermann Burmeister in 1883. It is found in Argentina.
