= Hypercompe theophila =

Scientific classification
- Domain: Eukaryota
- Kingdom: Animalia
- Phylum: Arthropoda
- Class: Insecta
- Order: Lepidoptera
- Superfamily: Noctuoidea
- Family: Erebidae
- Subfamily: Arctiinae
- Genus: Hypercompe
- Species: H. theophila

Binomial name
- Hypercompe theophila (Dognin, 1902)

Synonyms
- Ecpantheria theophila Dognin, 1902

Species of moth

Hypercompe theophila is a moth of the family Erebidae first described by Paul Dognin in 1902. It is found in Colombia.
