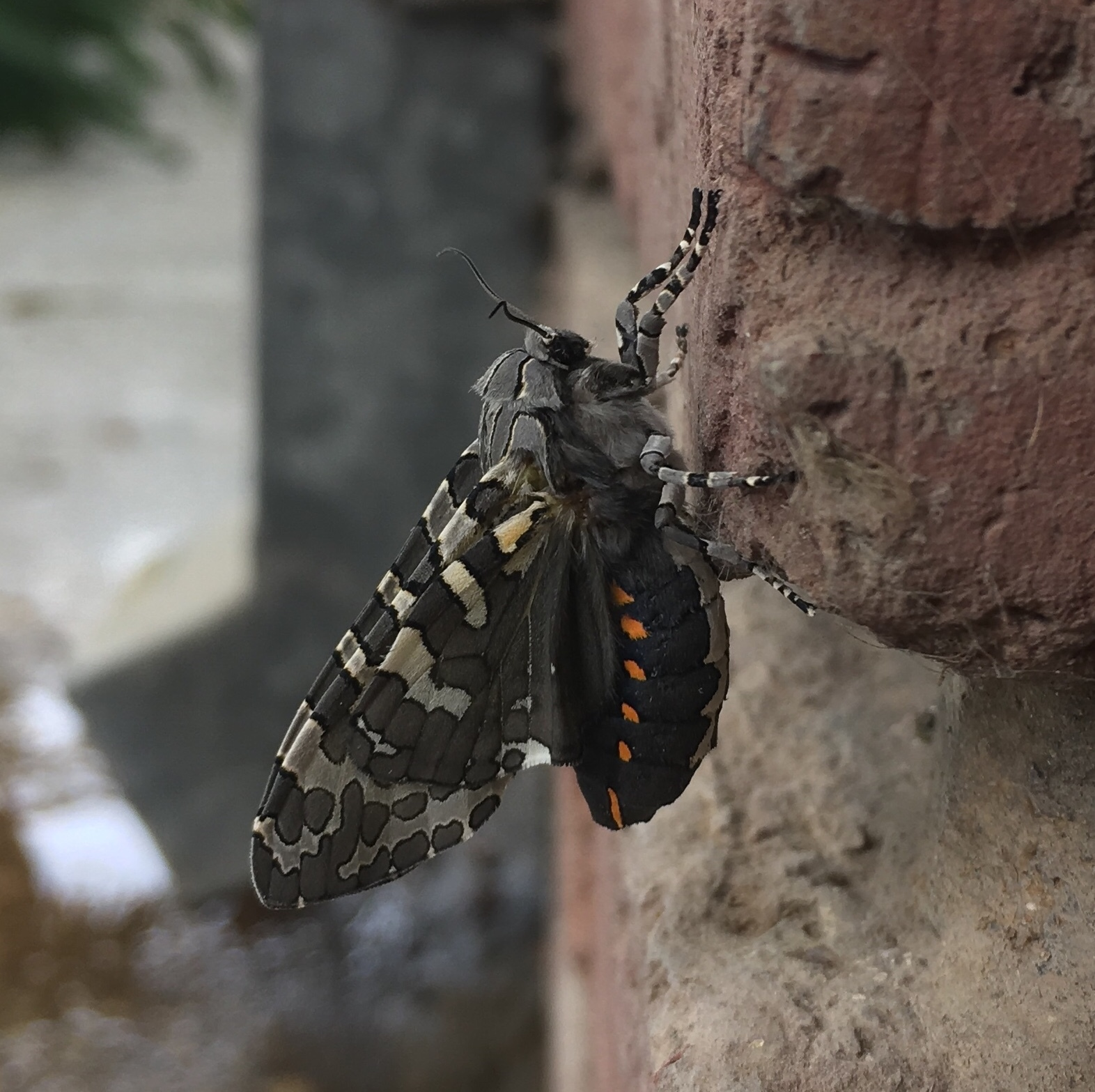

Scientific classification
- Kingdom: Animalia
- Phylum: Arthropoda
- Class: Insecta
- Order: Lepidoptera
- Superfamily: Noctuoidea
- Family: Erebidae
- Subfamily: Arctiinae
- Genus: Hypercompe
- Species: H. indecisa

Binomial name
- Hypercompe indecisa (Walker, 1855)

Synonyms
- Ecpantheria indecisa Walker, 1855; Ecpantheria degenera Walker, 1855; Ecpantheria annulifascia Walker, 1869; Ecpantheria indecisa ab. indecisana Strand, 1919; Ecpantheria indecisa ab. candida Köhler, 1924; Ecpantheria indecisa ab. confluens Köhler, 1924

= Hypercompe indecisa =

Species of moth

Hypercompe indecisa is a moth of the family Erebidae first described by Francis Walker in 1855. It is found in Argentina and Uruguay.

Larvae have been recorded feeding on Beta, Brassica, Citrus, Cucurbita, Datura, Diospyros, Fragaria, Hippeastrum, Leucanthemum, Persea, Pisum, Prunus, Ricinus, Rosa, Senecio, Solanum, Spiraea and Zea species.
