= Hypercompe abdominalis =

Scientific classification
- Kingdom: Animalia
- Phylum: Arthropoda
- Class: Insecta
- Order: Lepidoptera
- Superfamily: Noctuoidea
- Family: Erebidae
- Subfamily: Arctiinae
- Genus: Hypercompe
- Species: H. abdominalis

Binomial name
- Hypercompe abdominalis (Walker, [1865])

Synonyms
- Ecpantheria abdominalis Walker, [1865]; Ecpantheria proxima Oberthür, 1881; Ecpantheria detectiva Oberthür, 1881; Ecpantheria annexa Oberthür, 1881; Ocpantheria aramis Oberthür, 1881

Species of moth

Hypercompe abdominalis is a moth of the family Erebidae. It is found in Brazil (Para, Minas Gerais, Rio de Janeiro).

Larvae have been recorded feeding on Brassica and Veronica species.
