= Hypercompe simplex =

Scientific classification
- Kingdom: Animalia
- Phylum: Arthropoda
- Class: Insecta
- Order: Lepidoptera
- Superfamily: Noctuoidea
- Family: Erebidae
- Subfamily: Arctiinae
- Genus: Hypercompe
- Species: H. simplex

Binomial name
- Hypercompe simplex (Walker, 1855)

Synonyms
- Ecpantheria simplex Walker, 1855; Ecpantheria obliterata Walker, 1855; Ecpantheria guadulpensis Oberthür, 1881

Species of moth

Hypercompe simplex is a moth of the family Erebidae first described by Francis Walker in 1855. It is found in Puerto Rico, as well as on the Virgin Islands and the Lesser Antilles.

The larvae feed on Cedrella, Cissus, Erechtotes, Erythrina, Ipomaea and Solanum torvum.
