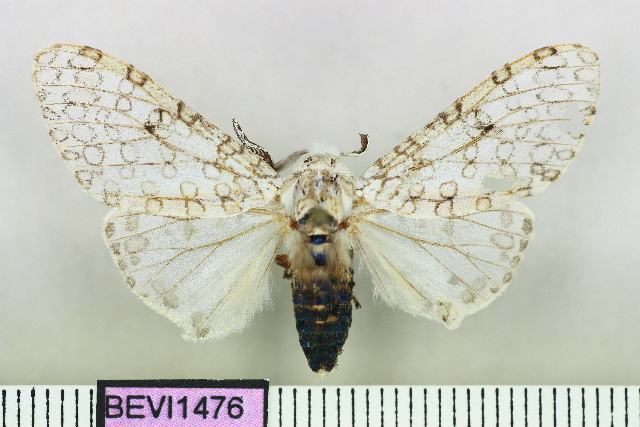

Scientific classification
- Kingdom: Animalia
- Phylum: Arthropoda
- Class: Insecta
- Order: Lepidoptera
- Superfamily: Noctuoidea
- Family: Erebidae
- Subfamily: Arctiinae
- Genus: Hypercompe
- Species: H. albicornis

Binomial name
- Hypercompe albicornis (Grote, 1865)

Synonyms
- Ecpantheria albicornis Grote, 1865

= Hypercompe albicornis =

Species of moth

Hypercompe albicornis is a moth of the family Erebidae first described by Augustus Radcliffe Grote in 1865. It is found on Cuba.

Larvae have been recorded feeding on Helianthus, Luffa and Phaseolus species.
