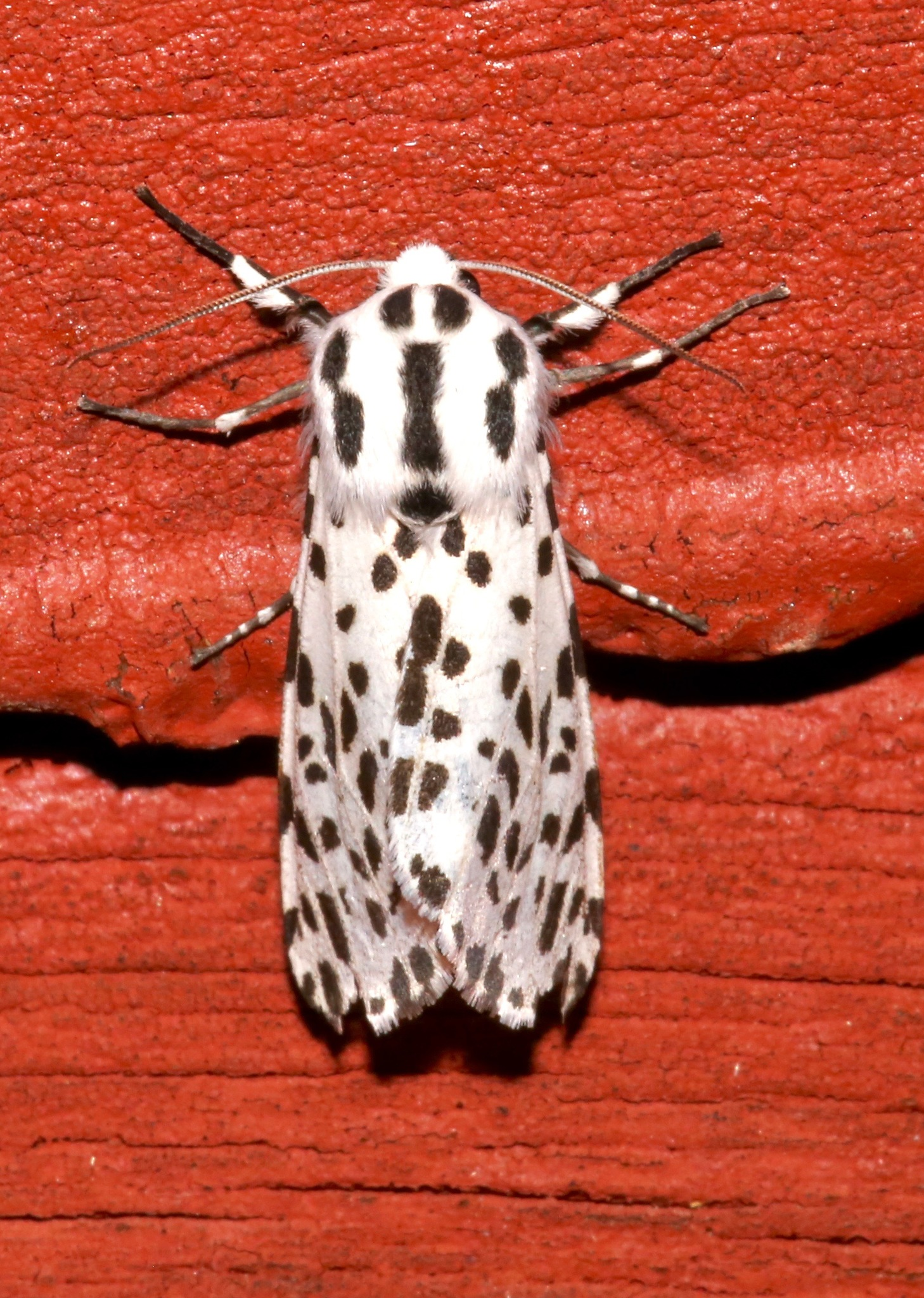

Scientific classification
- Kingdom: Animalia
- Phylum: Arthropoda
- Clade: Pancrustacea
- Class: Insecta
- Order: Lepidoptera
- Superfamily: Noctuoidea
- Family: Erebidae
- Subfamily: Arctiinae
- Genus: Hypsocompe
- Species: H. permaculata

Binomial name
- Hypsocompe permaculata (Packard, 1872)

Synonyms
- Hypercompe permaculata Packard, 1872

= Hypsocompe permaculata =

Species of moth

Hypsocompe permaculata, the many-spotted tiger moth, is a species of tiger moth in the family Erebidae. It was first described by Alpheus Spring Packard in 1872. It is native to the western United States and parts of northern Mexico.
