= Hypercompe caudata =

Scientific classification
- Kingdom: Animalia
- Phylum: Arthropoda
- Clade: Pancrustacea
- Class: Insecta
- Order: Lepidoptera
- Superfamily: Noctuoidea
- Family: Erebidae
- Subfamily: Arctiinae
- Genus: Hypercompe
- Species: H. caudata

Binomial name
- Hypercompe caudata (Walker, 1855)

Synonyms
- Ecpantheria caudata Walker, 1855; Ecpantheria abscondens Oberthür, 1881; Ecpantheria yukatanensis Oberthür, 1881; Ecpantheria mexicana Oberthür, 1881; Ecpantheria sennettii Lintner, 1884

Species of moth

Hypercompe caudata is a moth of the family Erebidae. It was described by Francis Walker in 1855. It is found in Texas, southern Arizona, Mexico, Costa Rica, Honduras and Nicaragua.

The wingspan is 56 mm for males and 86 mm for females. Adults are on wing in January, April, October and November.
