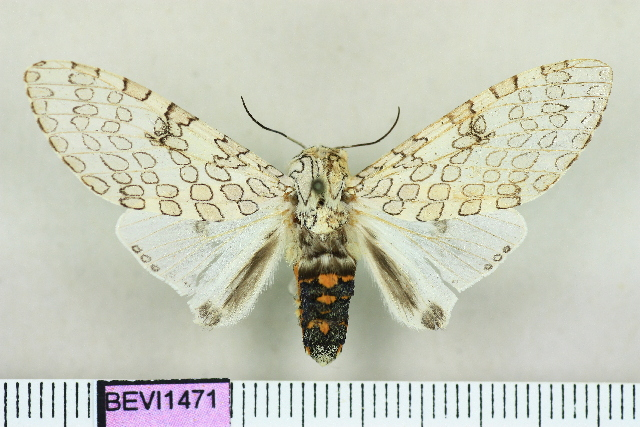

Scientific classification
- Domain: Eukaryota
- Kingdom: Animalia
- Phylum: Arthropoda
- Class: Insecta
- Order: Lepidoptera
- Superfamily: Noctuoidea
- Family: Erebidae
- Subfamily: Arctiinae
- Genus: Hypercompe
- Species: H. ganglio

Binomial name
- Hypercompe ganglio (Oberthür, 1881)

Synonyms
- Ecpantheria ganglio Oberthür, 1881

= Hypercompe ganglio =

Species of moth

Hypercompe ganglio is a moth of the family Erebidae. It is found in Brazil.
