= Hypercompe nigriplaga =

Scientific classification
- Kingdom: Animalia
- Phylum: Arthropoda
- Class: Insecta
- Order: Lepidoptera
- Superfamily: Noctuoidea
- Family: Erebidae
- Subfamily: Arctiinae
- Genus: Hypercompe
- Species: H. nigriplaga

Binomial name
- Hypercompe nigriplaga (Walker, 1855)

Synonyms
- Ecpantheria nigriplaga Walker, 1855; Ecpantheria obesa Walker, 1855; Ecpantheria ab. postfusca Strand, 1921

Species of moth

Hypercompe nigriplaga is a moth of the family Erebidae first described by Francis Walker in 1855. It is found on Jamaica.
