= Hypercompe eridanus =

Scientific classification
- Domain: Eukaryota
- Kingdom: Animalia
- Phylum: Arthropoda
- Class: Insecta
- Order: Lepidoptera
- Superfamily: Noctuoidea
- Family: Erebidae
- Subfamily: Arctiinae
- Genus: Hypercompe
- Species: H. eridanus

Binomial name
- Hypercompe eridanus (Cramer, [1775])

Synonyms
- Phalaena eridanus Cramer, [1775]

Species of moth

Hypercompe eridanus is a moth of the family Erebidae first described by Pieter Cramer in 1775. It is found in Colombia, Suriname, and French Guiana.

Larvae have been recorded feeding on Cissus, Citrus, Erythrina, Ipomoea, Musa, Panicum, and Vanilla species.
