= Hypercompe campinasa =

Scientific classification
- Domain: Eukaryota
- Kingdom: Animalia
- Phylum: Arthropoda
- Class: Insecta
- Order: Lepidoptera
- Superfamily: Noctuoidea
- Family: Erebidae
- Subfamily: Arctiinae
- Genus: Hypercompe
- Species: H. campinasa

Binomial name
- Hypercompe campinasa (Schaus, 1938)

Synonyms
- Ecpantheria campinasa Schaus, 1938

Species of moth

Hypercompe campinasa is a moth of the family Erebidae first described by William Schaus in 1938. It is found in Brazil.

The larvae have been recorded feeding on Gossypium herbaceum.
