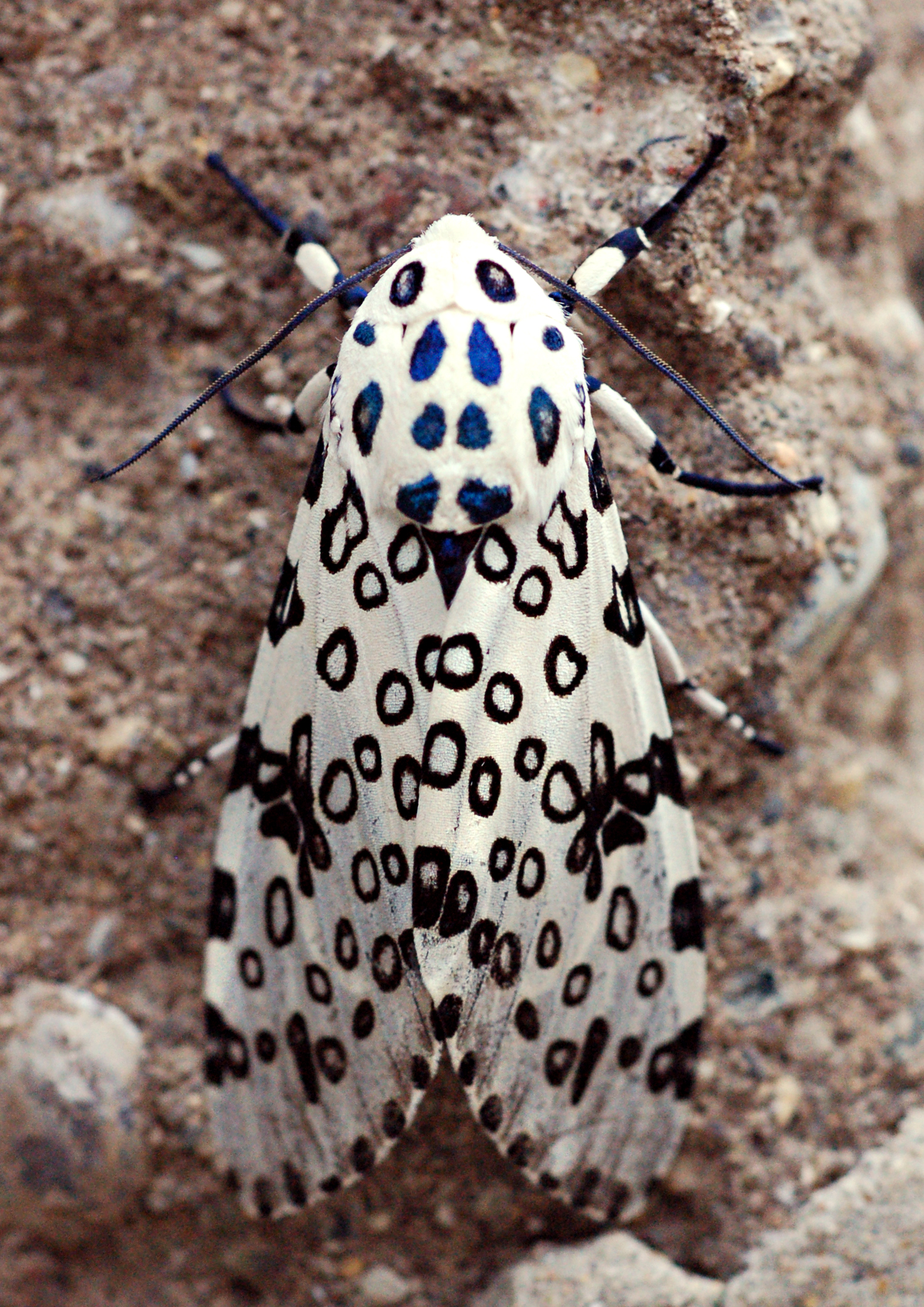

Conservation status
- Secure (NatureServe)

Scientific classification
- Kingdom: Animalia
- Phylum: Arthropoda
- Clade: Pancrustacea
- Class: Insecta
- Order: Lepidoptera
- Superfamily: Noctuoidea
- Family: Erebidae
- Subfamily: Arctiinae
- Genus: Hypercompe
- Species: H. scribonia

Binomial name
- Hypercompe scribonia (Stoll, 1790)

Subspecies
- H. s. scribonia (Stoll, 1790); H. s. denudata (Slosson, 1888)

Synonyms
- Bombyx chryseis Olivier, 1790; Phalaena scribonia Stoll, 1790; Phalaena oculatissima J.E. Smith, 1797 (unjustified emendation); Bombyx cunegunda Palisot de Beauvois, 1824; Ecpantheria confluens Oberthür, 1881; Ecpantheria denudata Slosson, 1888; Ecpantheria scribonia

= Giant leopard moth =

Species of moth

The giant leopard moth (Hypercompe scribonia) is a moth of the family Erebidae. They are distributed through North America from southern Ontario, and southern and eastern United States through New England, Mexico, and south to Colombia. The obsolete name, Ecpantheria scribonia, is still occasionally encountered.

They are known to be attracted to bitter, unripe vegetables and broccoli flowers.

This moth species has a wingspan of 76 mm (3 in). Its wings are bright white with a pattern of neat black blotches, some solid and some hollow. The overside of the abdomen is dark blue with orange markings, while the underside is white with solid black spots, and males have a narrow yellow line on the sides. Their legs have black and white bands. Adult moths are strictly nocturnal and do not generally fly before nightfall.

This species has a notable sexual dimorphism in size, with the adult male reaching about 51 mm (2 in) in length, while the adult female grows up to 30 mm (1.2 in). The leopard moth requires two years to complete its round of life. In Missouri, adults are on the wing from May to September and are multivoltine. During mating sessions, the wings of the male cover most of the female's abdomen, which can sometimes lead to the loss of wing scales in the female and have negative effects on her flight efficiency. Their mating sessions are notably long-lasting, taking more than 24 hours. They stay mostly immobile during the whole process, but move from spot to spot to thermoregulate, walking into shadowy areas if too hot or into sunlight if too cold. The male effectuates the locomotion, while the female folds her legs to make her easier to carry.

The caterpillar is of the "woolly bear" kind, with a thick coat of black bristles (setae) and red or orange bands between its segments, which become conspicuous when the caterpillar rolls into a ball for defense. Like the banded woolly bear, its hairs are not urticant nor venomous and do not typically cause irritation. The moth overwinters as a caterpillar, often under the bark of decaying wood. The caterpillar grows to be 7.6 cm (3 in) long.

== Recorded food plants ==
The caterpillar eats a variety of broadleaf plants, such as broadleaf plantains, dandelions, and violets:

- Acer (maple)
- Bougainvillea
- Brassica oleracea (cabbage)
- Brugmansia (angel trumpet)
- Cannabis
- Citrus
- Dioscorea
- Euphorbia
- Helianthus (sunflower)
- Lagerstroemia (crepe myrtle)
- Lactuca sativa (lettuce)
- Lonicera (honeysuckle)
- Magnolia
- Morus (mulberry tree)
- Musa (banana/plantain)
- Ocimum basilicum (basil)
- Paulownia (princess tree)
- Persea
- Phytolacca
- Plantago
- Prunus
- Pyrostegia
- Ricinus
- Robinia
- Salix (willow)
- Syringa (lilac)
- Taraxacum (dandelion)
- Viola

== Gallery ==
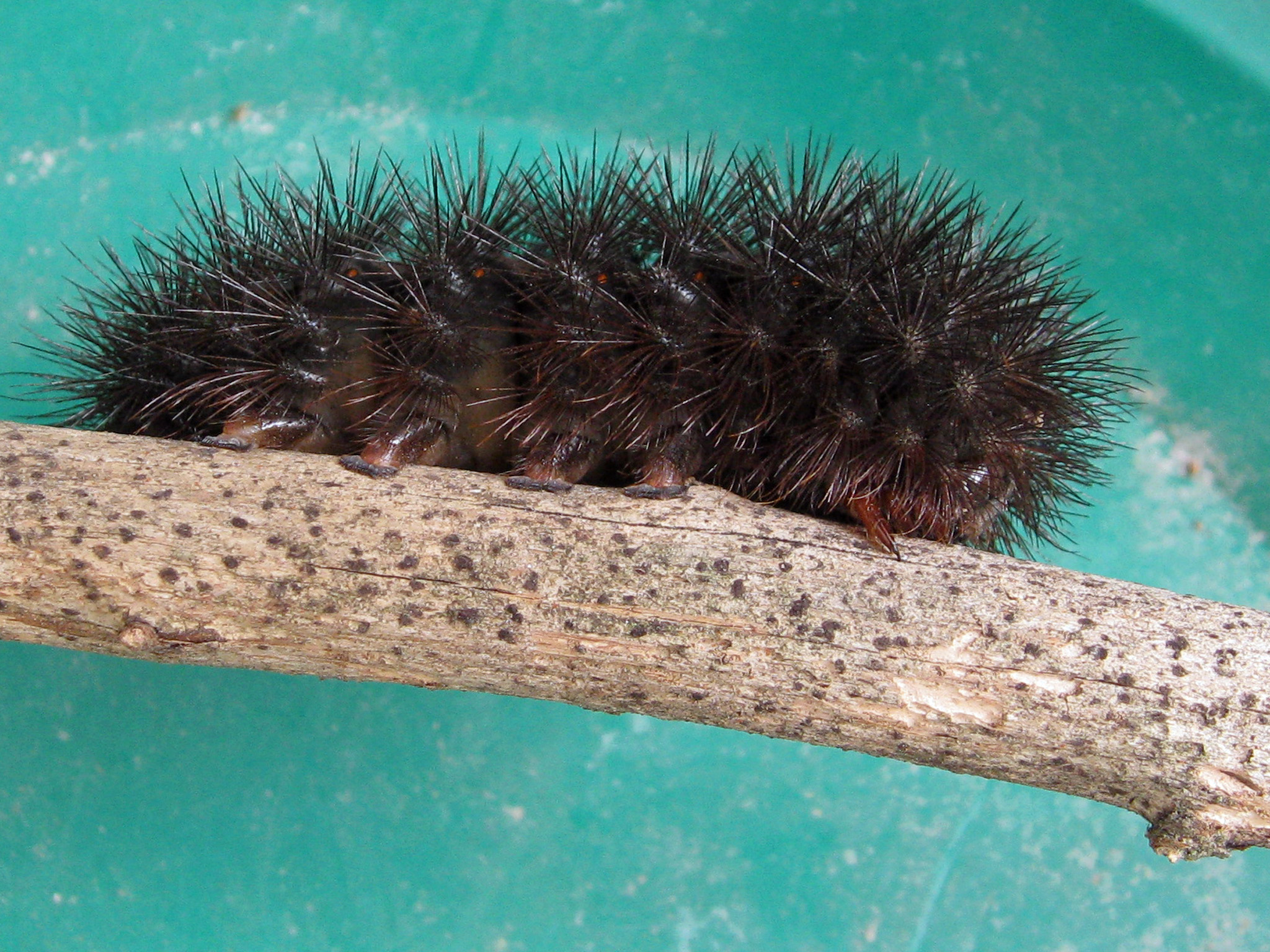
Larval stage

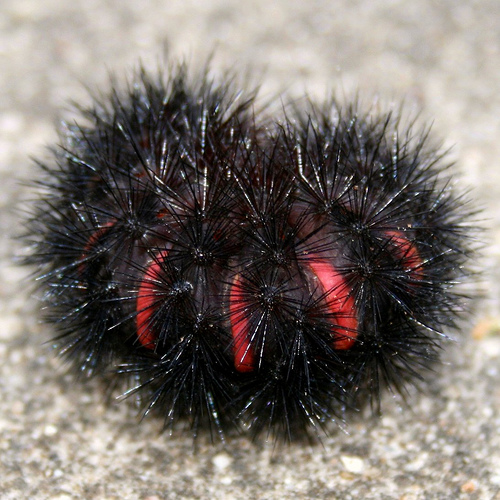
Caterpillar in typical defensive ball

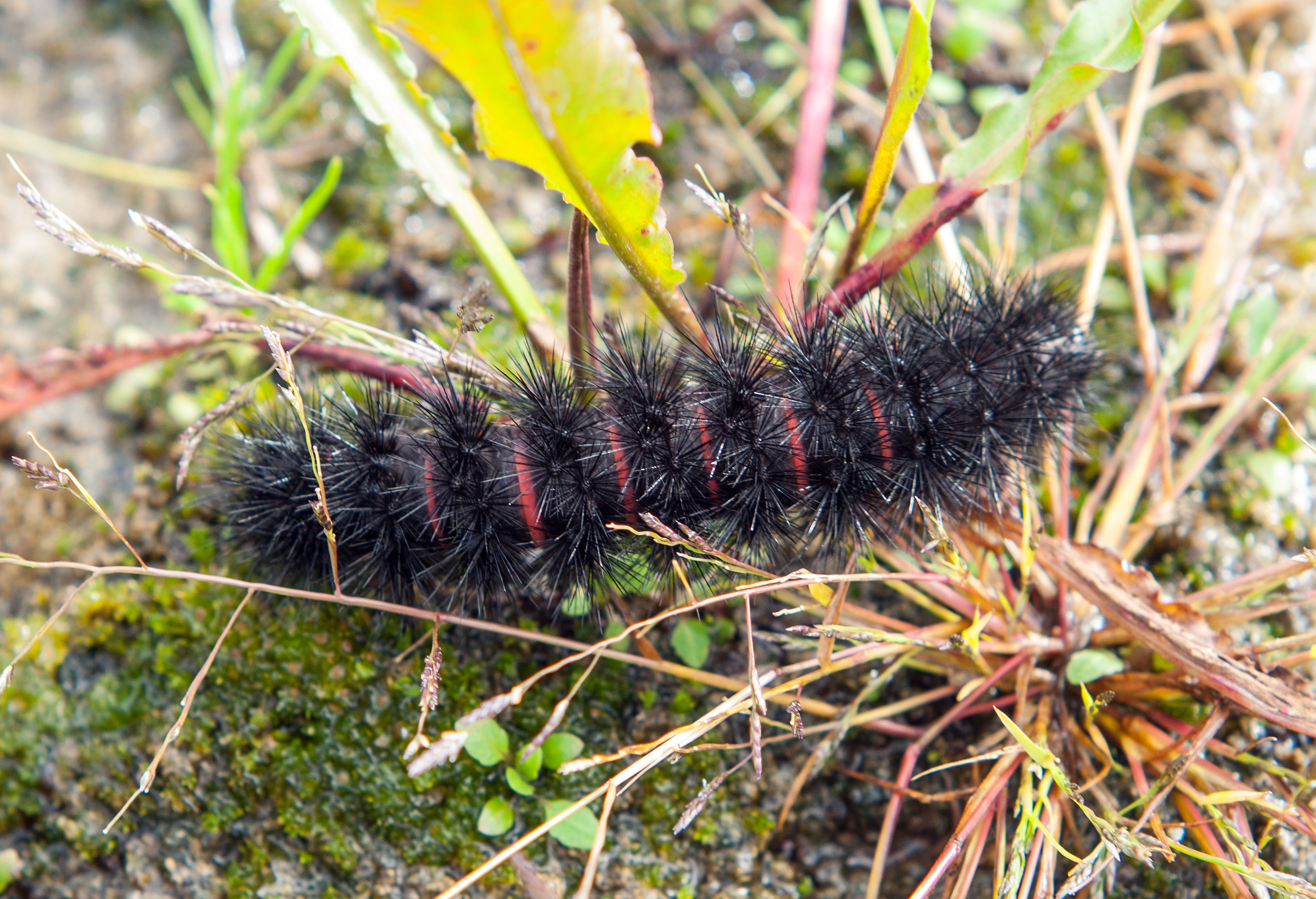
Caterpillar with typical red stripes

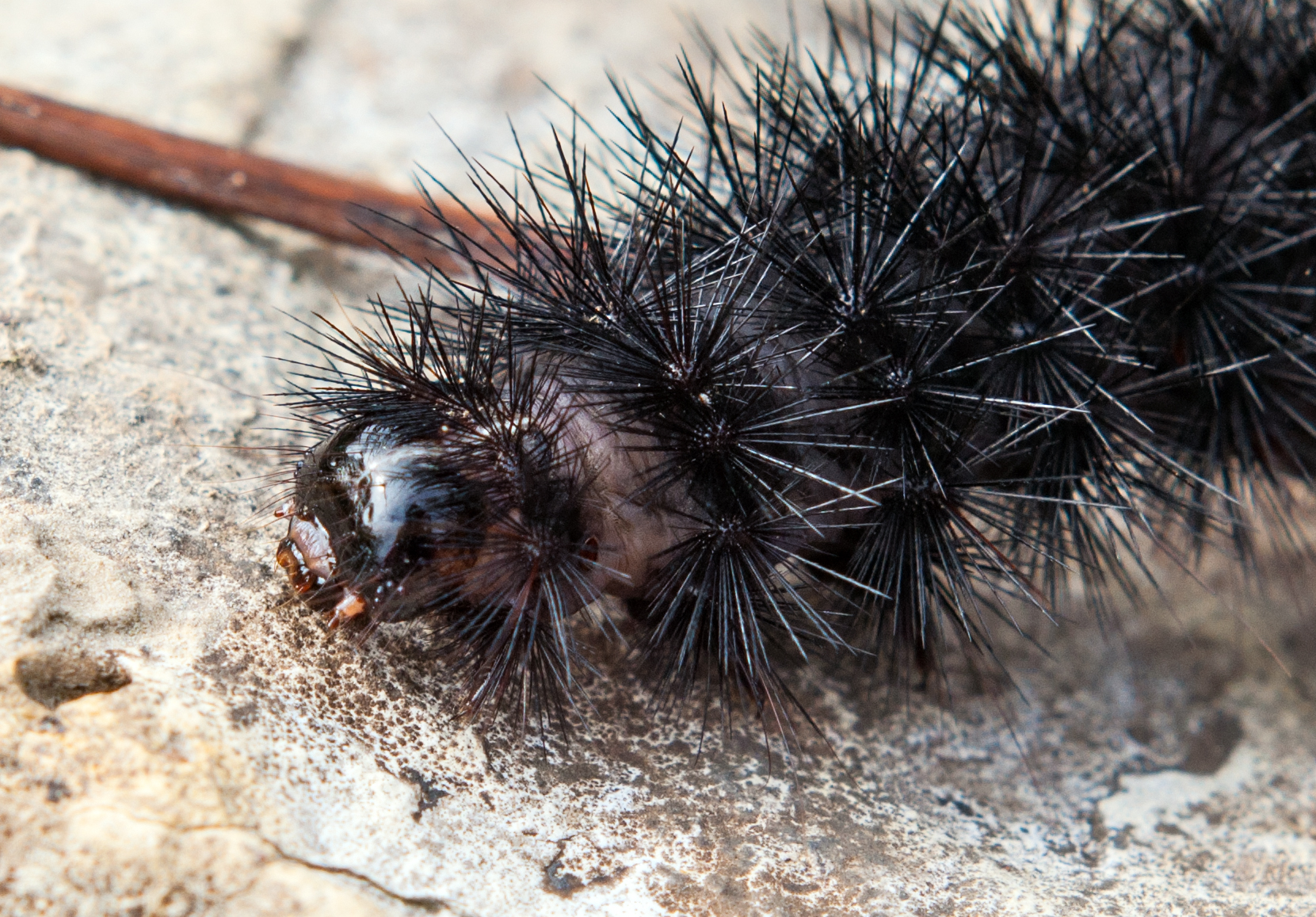
Head of a caterpillar

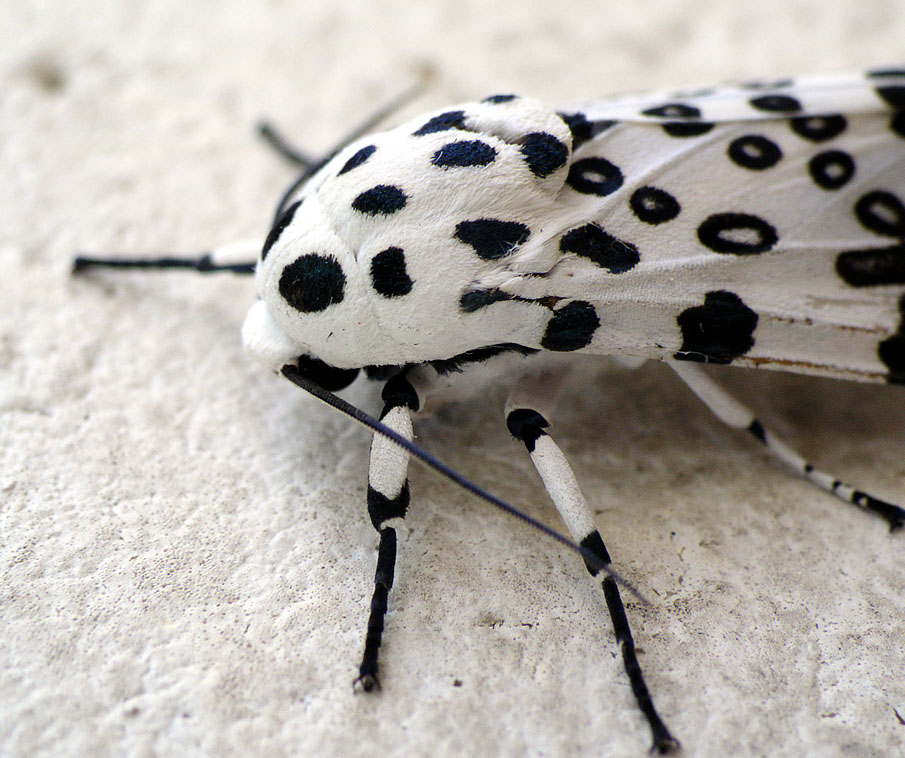
Closeup of head and thorax

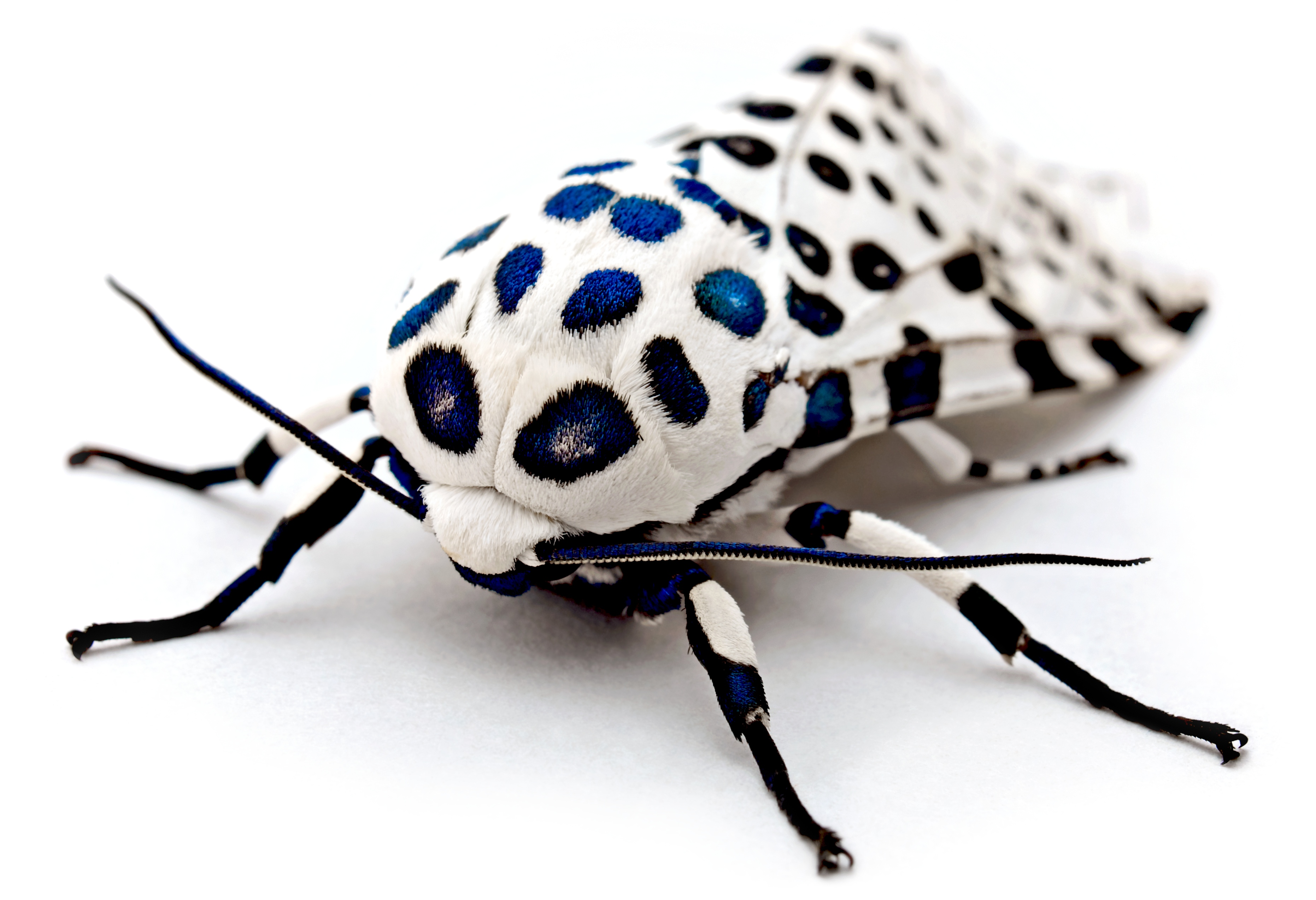
Closeup showing iridescent blue spots

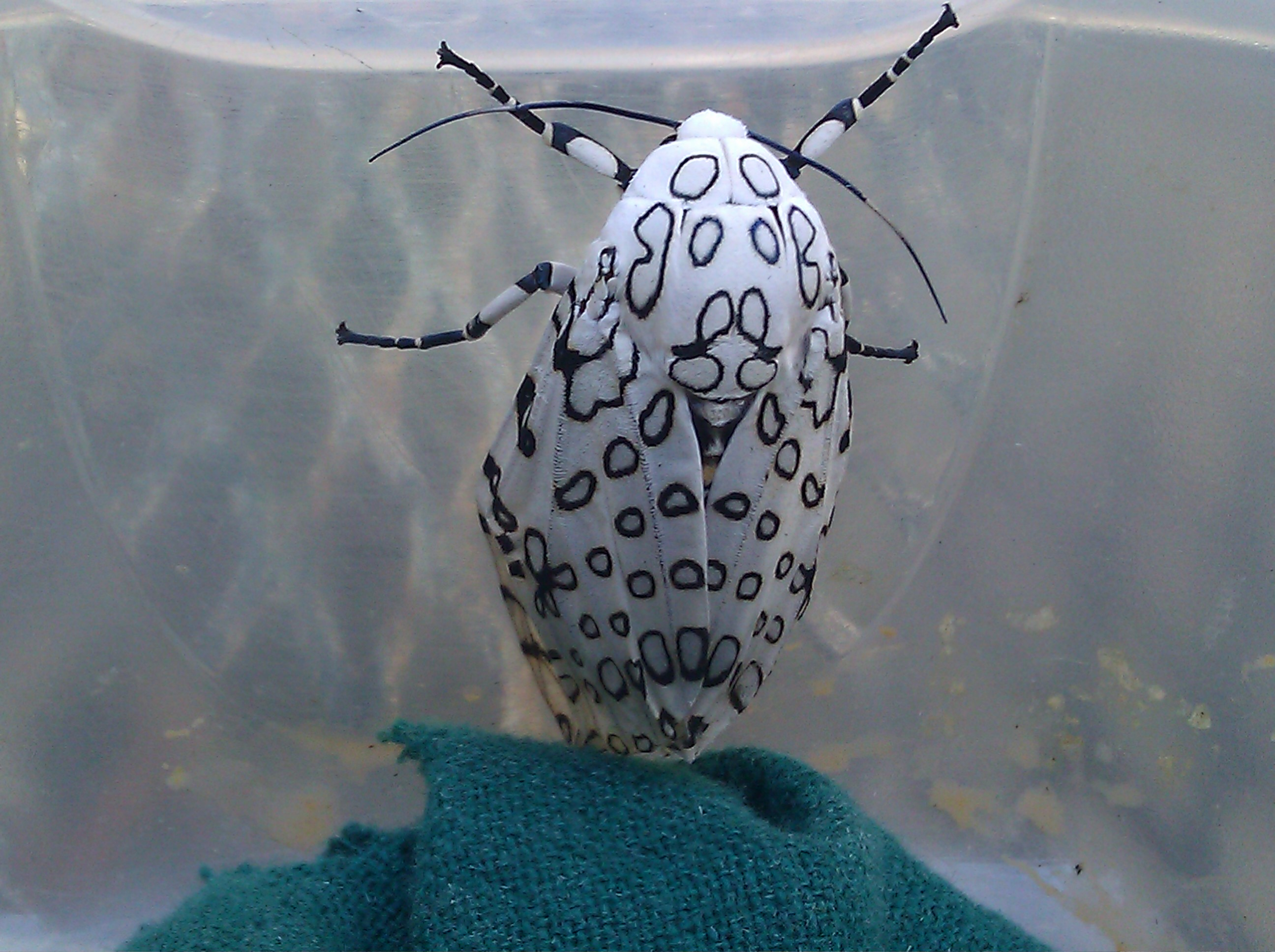
Closeup of newly eclosed moth

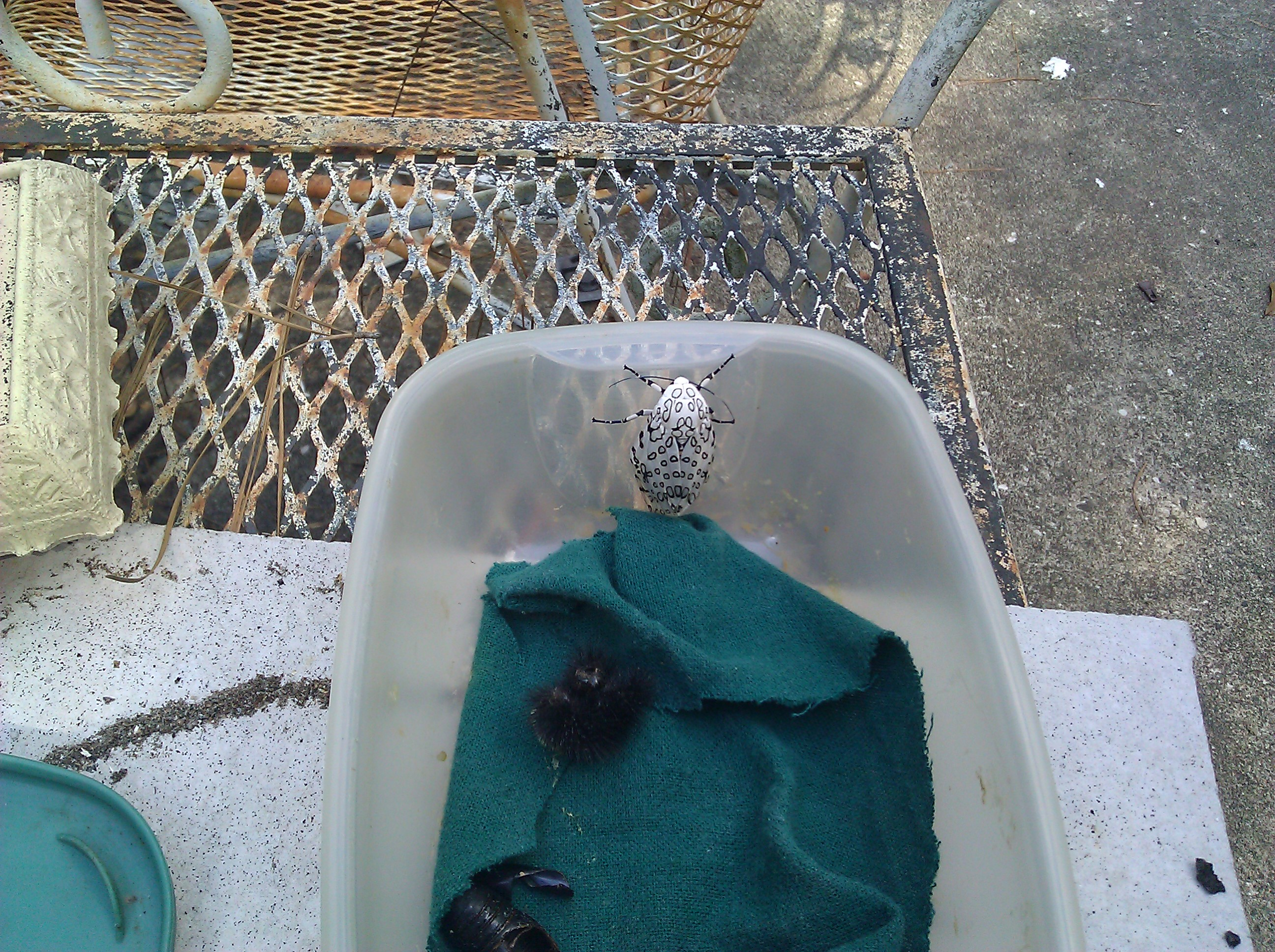
Showing the old skin, empty pupal shell, and adult moth

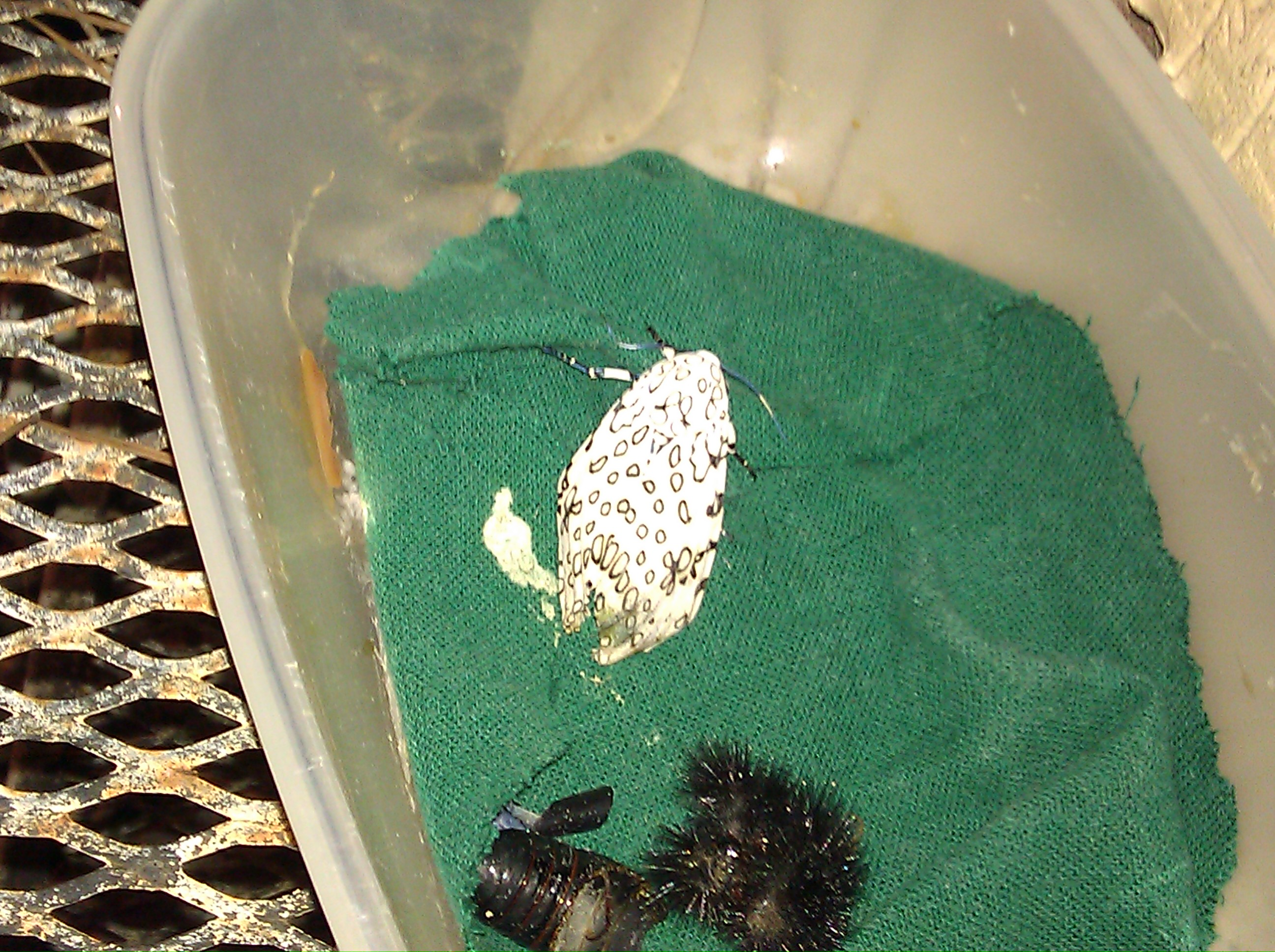
Last image at night before it flew off once wings dried

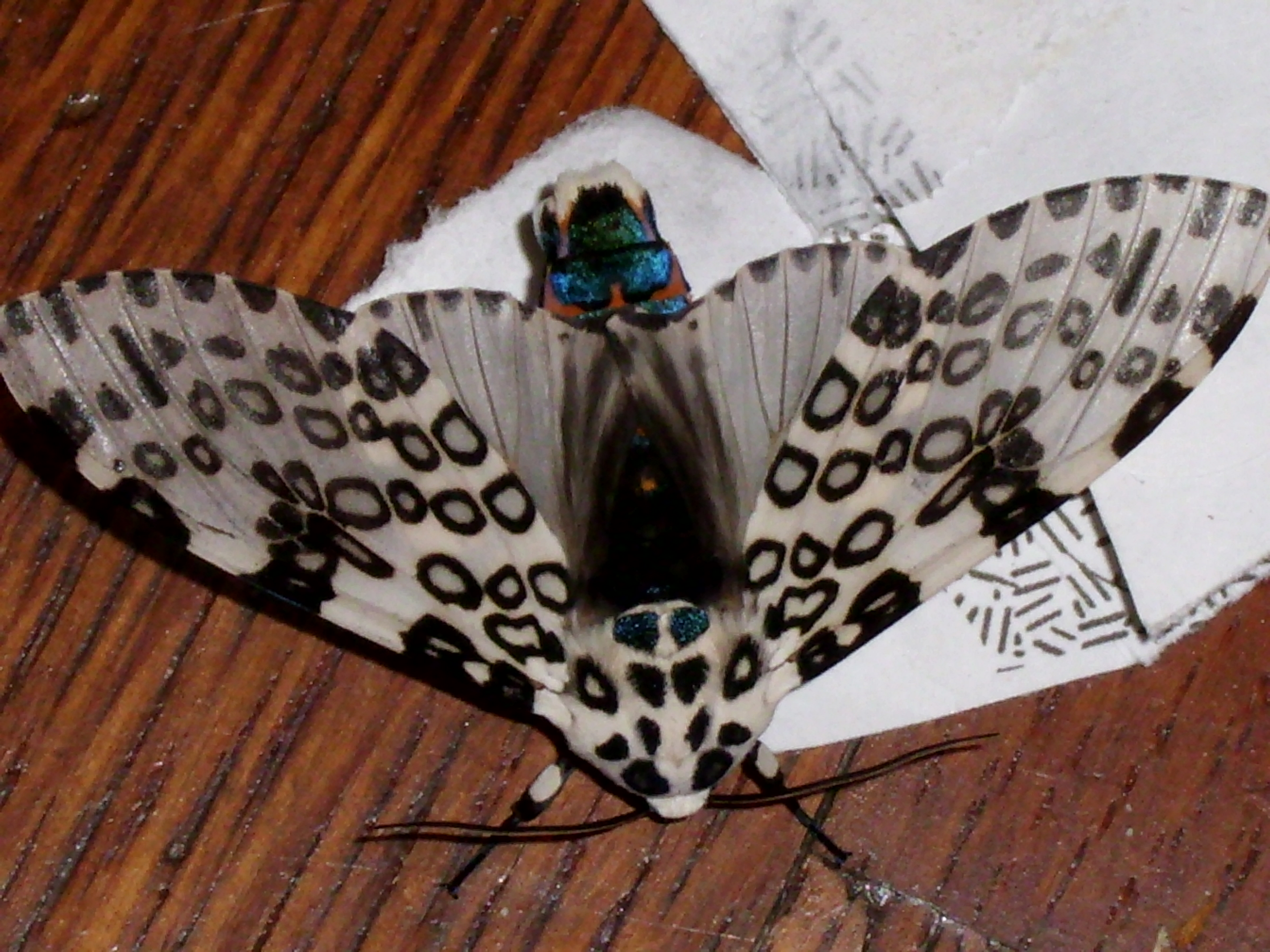
Wings spread, displaying abdomen colors

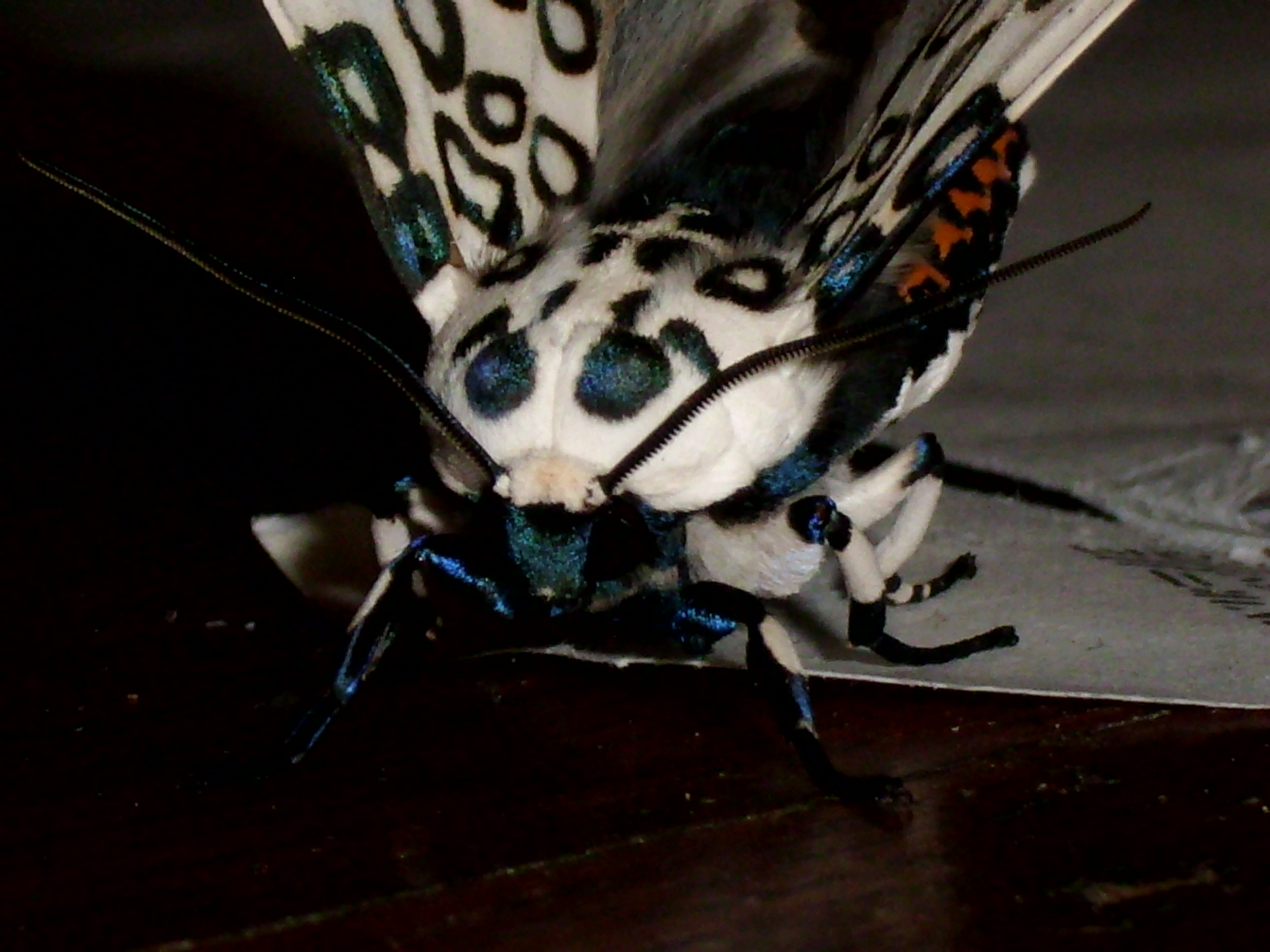
Close-up while wings upswept

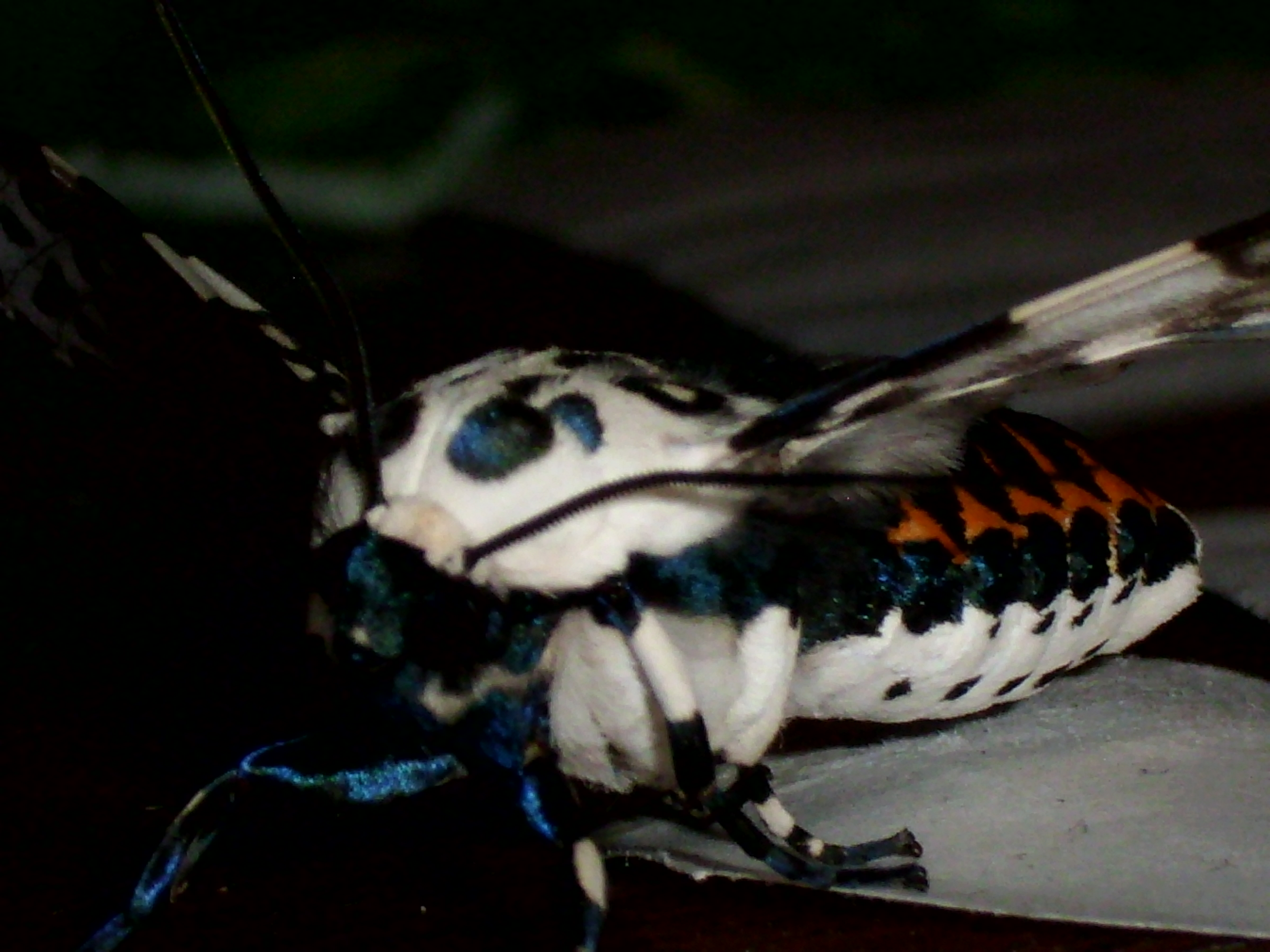
The moment before take-off

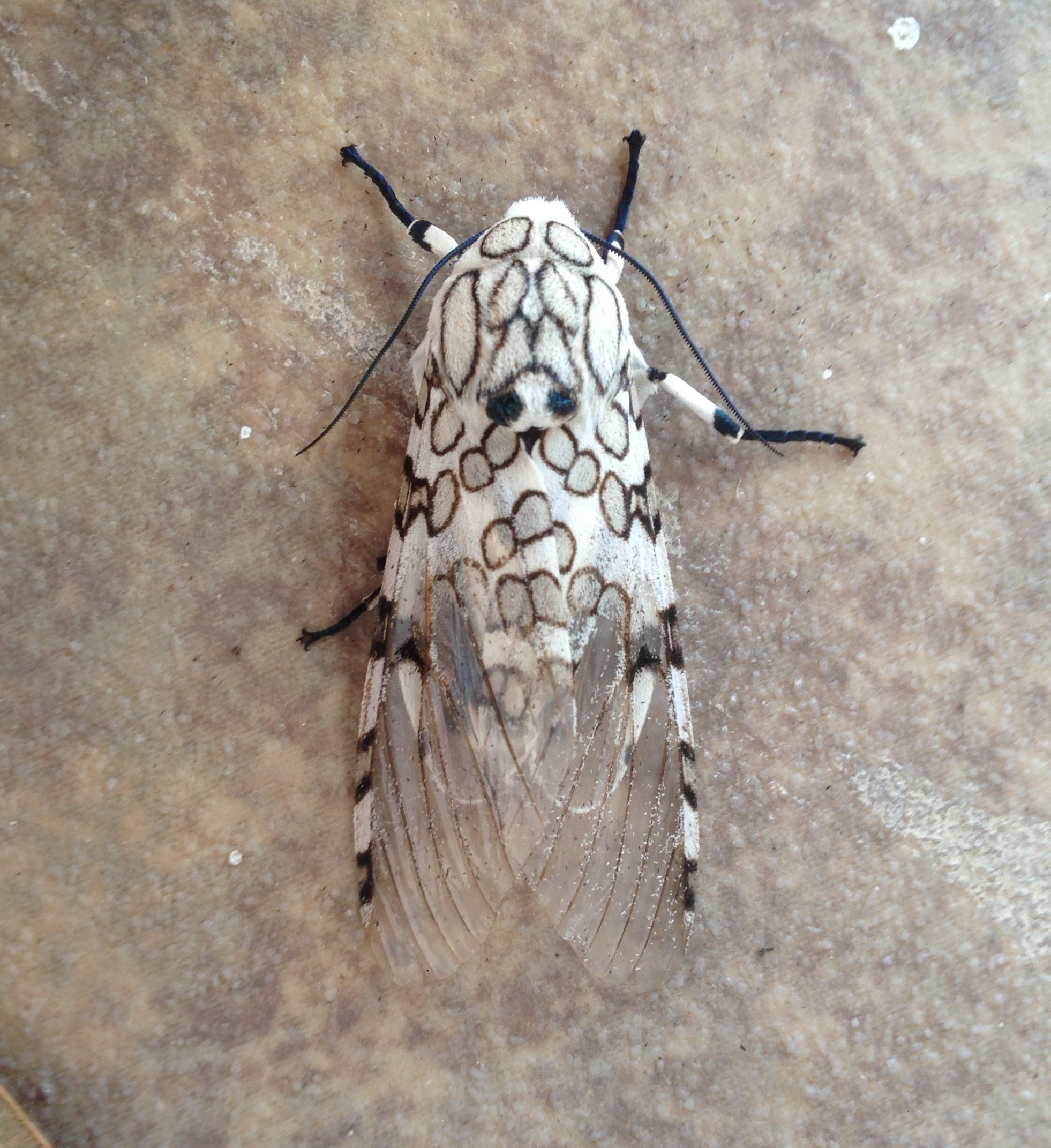
A female giant leopard moth after mating

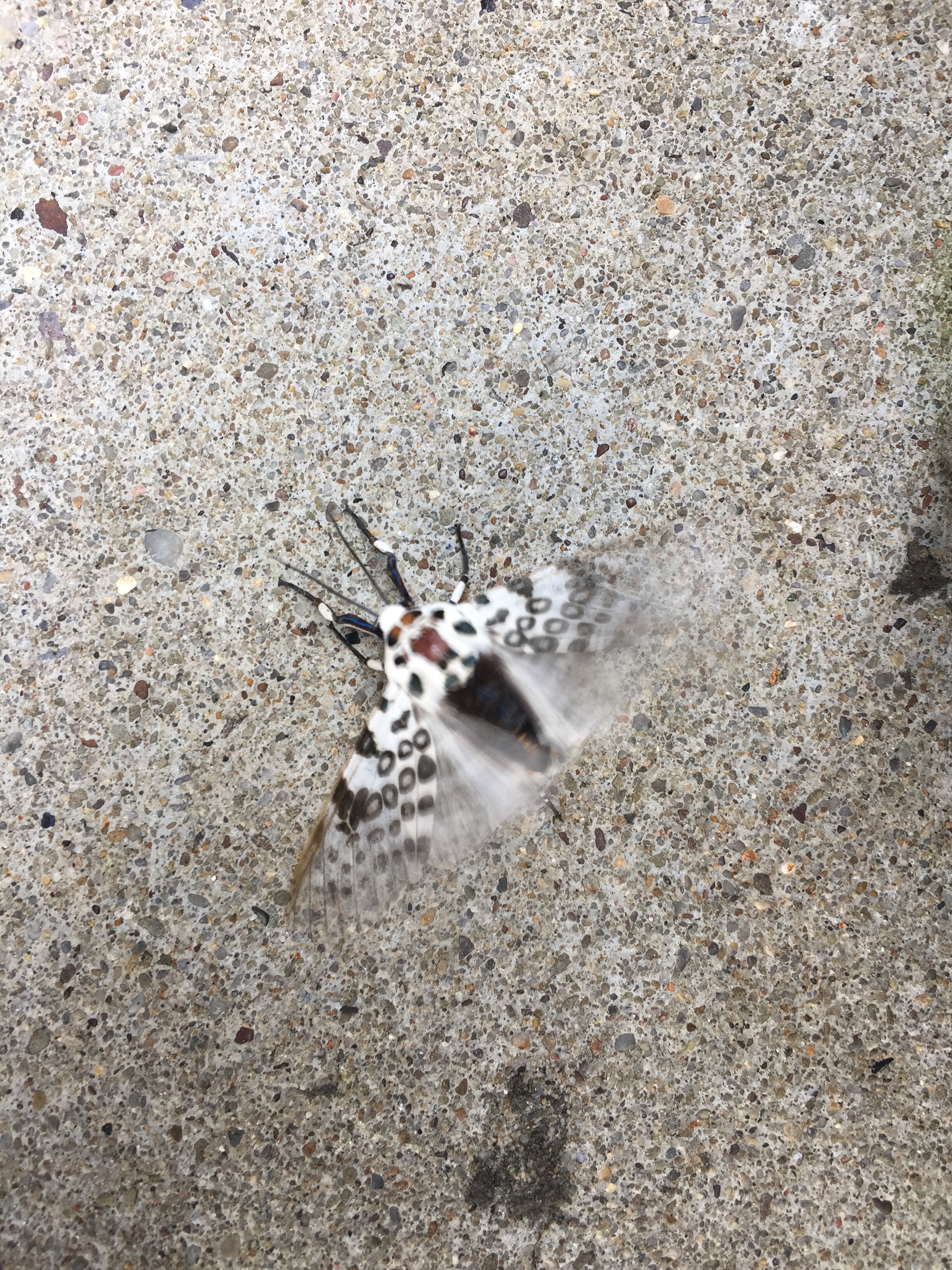
A female taking off after mating
