= Hypercompe ocularia =

Ocularia leopard

Scientific classification
- Domain: Eukaryota
- Kingdom: Animalia
- Phylum: Arthropoda
- Class: Insecta
- Order: Lepidoptera
- Superfamily: Noctuoidea
- Family: Erebidae
- Subfamily: Arctiinae
- Genus: Hypercompe
- Species: H. ocularia

Binomial name
- Hypercompe ocularia (Fabricius, 1775)

Synonyms
- Bombyx ocularia Fabricius, 1775; Ecpantheria cyaneator Walker, [1865]; Ecpantheria columbina Oberthür, 1881; Ecpantheria distans Oberthür, 1881

Species of moth

Hypercompe ocularia, the ocularia leopard, is a moth of the family Erebidae. The species was first described by Johan Christian Fabricius in 1775.

== Description ==
This moth is a translucent-white colour, patterned with numerous brown, oval rings on the forewings.

== Distribution ==
It is found in Colombia, Peru and Ecuador. This is a cloud-forest species found at elevations between about 200–1000 m.

== Biology ==
Moths of the genus Hypercompe are noxious to birds and exhibit warning colouration. When approached by a bird, these moths expose a coloured abdomen and exude noxious fluids as a defence mechanism.

== Sources ==
- Pitkin, Brian & Jenkins, Paul. "Search results Family: Arctiidae". Butterflies and Moths of the World. Natural History Museum, London.
