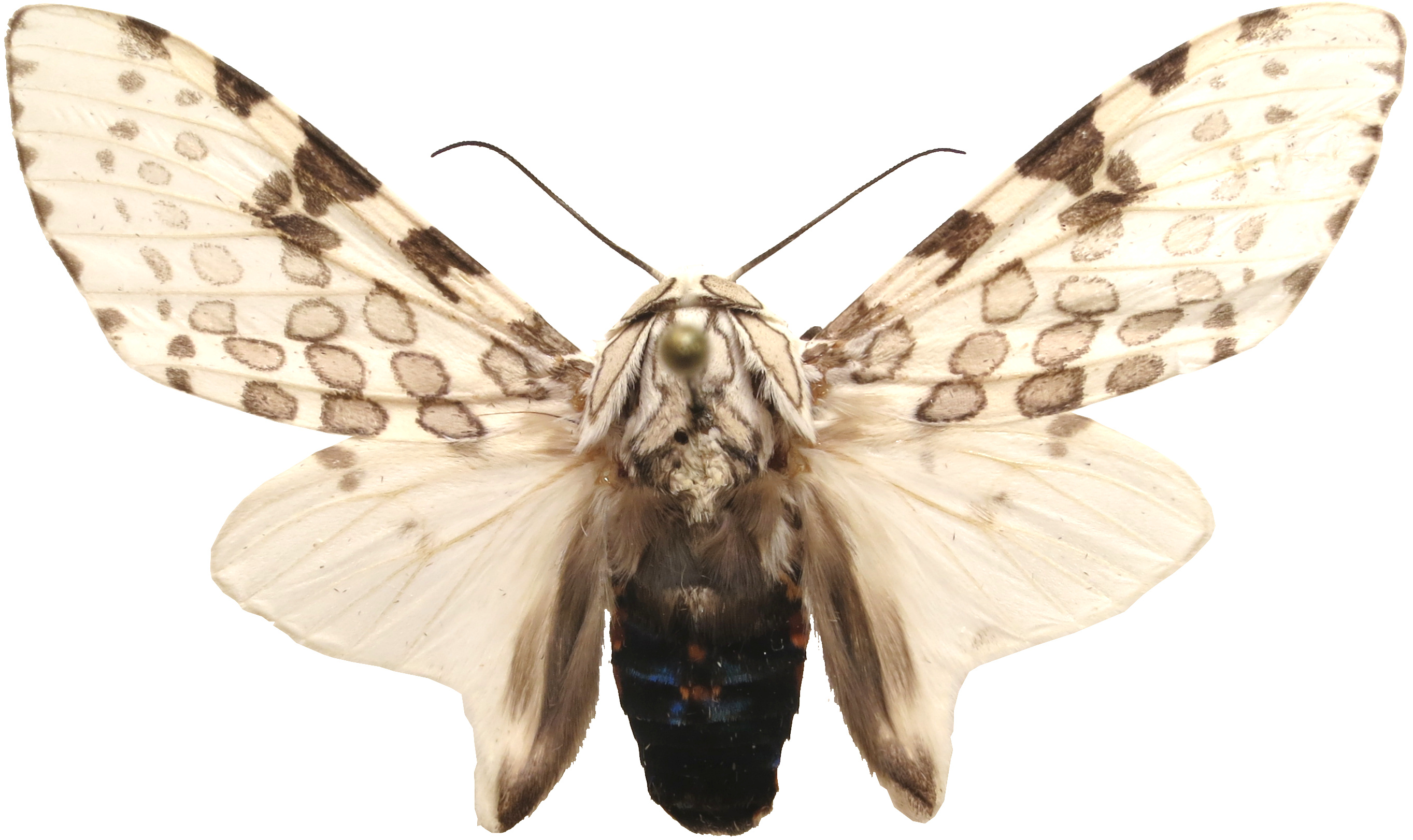
- From French Guiana

Scientific classification
- Domain: Eukaryota
- Kingdom: Animalia
- Phylum: Arthropoda
- Class: Insecta
- Order: Lepidoptera
- Superfamily: Noctuoidea
- Family: Erebidae
- Subfamily: Arctiinae
- Genus: Hypercompe
- Species: H. cunigunda

Binomial name
- Hypercompe cunigunda (Stoll, [1781])

Synonyms
- Phalaena cunigunda Stoll, [1781]; Ecpantheria gunglio Oberthür, 1881; Ecpantheria cayennensis Oberthür, 1881; Ecpantheria cayennensis var. decipiens Oberthür, 1881

= Hypercompe cunigunda =

Species of moth

Hypercompe cunigunda is a moth of the family Erebidae first described by Caspar Stoll in 1781. It is found in French Guiana, Suriname, Brazil, Venezuela, Ecuador and Bolivia.

The larvae have been recorded feeding on Melothria pendula.
