= Hypercompe flavopunctata =

Scientific classification
- Domain: Eukaryota
- Kingdom: Animalia
- Phylum: Arthropoda
- Class: Insecta
- Order: Lepidoptera
- Superfamily: Noctuoidea
- Family: Erebidae
- Subfamily: Arctiinae
- Genus: Hypercompe
- Species: H. flavopunctata

Binomial name
- Hypercompe flavopunctata (Schaus, 1921)

Synonyms
- Ecpantheria flavopunctata Schaus, 1921

Species of moth

Hypercompe flavopunctata is a moth of the family Erebidae first described by William Schaus in 1921. It is found in Paraguay.
