= Testaptera fuscescens =

Scientific classification
- Kingdom: Animalia
- Phylum: Arthropoda
- Clade: Pancrustacea
- Class: Insecta
- Order: Lepidoptera
- Superfamily: Noctuoidea
- Family: Erebidae
- Subfamily: Arctiinae
- Genus: Testaptera
- Species: T. fuscescens

Binomial name
- Testaptera fuscescens (Rothschild, 1917)

Synonyms
- Turuptiana fuscescens Rothschild, 1917; Hypercompe fuscescens (Rothschild, 1917)

Species of moth

Testaptera fuscescens is a species of moth in the family Erebidae that was first described by Walter Rothschild in 1917. It is found in Peru.
