= Hypercompe deflorata =

Scientific classification
- Kingdom: Animalia
- Phylum: Arthropoda
- Class: Insecta
- Order: Lepidoptera
- Superfamily: Noctuoidea
- Family: Erebidae
- Subfamily: Arctiinae
- Genus: Hypercompe
- Species: H. deflorata

Binomial name
- Hypercompe deflorata (Fabricius, 1775)

Synonyms
- Bombyx deflorata Fabricius, 1775; Ecpantheria quitensis Oberthür, 1881; Ecpantheria quitensis ab. confluens Oberthür, 1881

Species of moth

Hypercompe deflorata is a moth of the family Erebidae first described by Johan Christian Fabricius in 1775. It is found in Ecuador.

== Subspecies ==
- Hypercompe deflorata deflorata
- Hypercompe deflorata quitensis Oberthür, 1881
