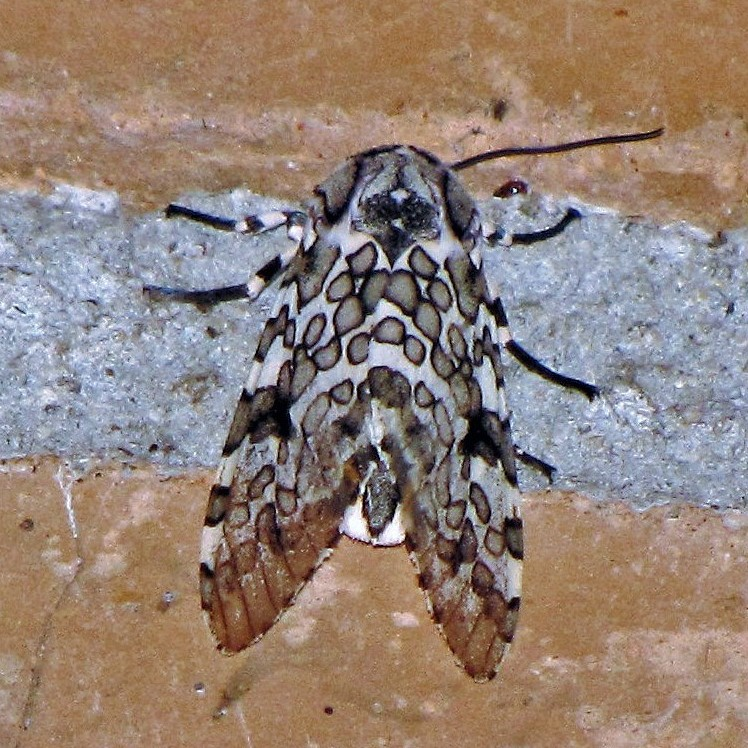

Scientific classification
- Kingdom: Animalia
- Phylum: Arthropoda
- Clade: Pancrustacea
- Class: Insecta
- Order: Lepidoptera
- Superfamily: Noctuoidea
- Family: Erebidae
- Subfamily: Arctiinae
- Genus: Hypercompe
- Species: H. detecta

Binomial name
- Hypercompe detecta (Oberthür, 1881)

Synonyms
- Ecpantheria detecta Oberthür, 1881; Ecpantheria dorsata Forbes, 1929

= Hypercompe detecta =

Species of moth

Hypercompe detecta is a species of moth in the family Erebidae. It was first described by Charles Oberthür in 1881 and is found in Brazil.

== Subspecies ==
- Hypercompe detecta detecta
- Hypercompe detecta dorsata (Forbes, 1929)
