= Hypercompe perplexa =

Scientific classification
- Domain: Eukaryota
- Kingdom: Animalia
- Phylum: Arthropoda
- Class: Insecta
- Order: Lepidoptera
- Superfamily: Noctuoidea
- Family: Erebidae
- Subfamily: Arctiinae
- Genus: Hypercompe
- Species: H. perplexa

Binomial name
- Hypercompe perplexa (Schaus, 1911)

Synonyms
- Ecpantheria perplexa Schaus, 1911

Species of moth

Hypercompe perplexa is a moth of the family Erebidae first described by William Schaus in 1911. It is found in Costa Rica.
