= Hypercompe euripides =

Scientific classification
- Kingdom: Animalia
- Phylum: Arthropoda
- Class: Insecta
- Order: Lepidoptera
- Superfamily: Noctuoidea
- Family: Erebidae
- Subfamily: Arctiinae
- Genus: Hypercompe
- Species: H. euripides

Binomial name
- Hypercompe euripides (Dyar, 1912)

Synonyms
- Ecpantheria euripides Dyar, 1912

Species of moth

Hypercompe euripides is a moth of the family Erebidae first described by Harrison Gray Dyar Jr. in 1912. It is found in Mexico.
