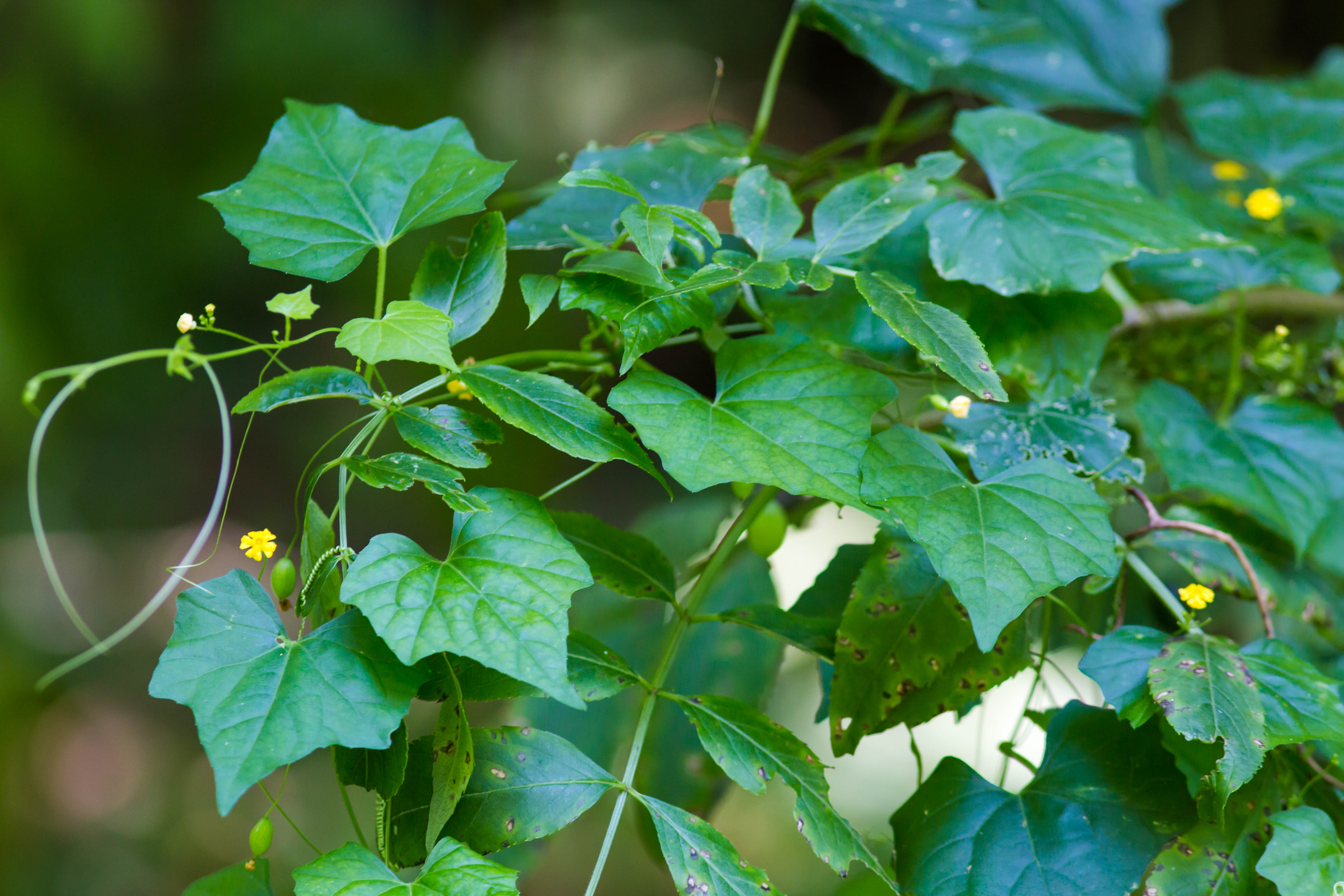

Scientific classification
- Kingdom: Plantae
- Clade: Tracheophytes
- Clade: Angiosperms
- Clade: Eudicots
- Clade: Rosids
- Order: Cucurbitales
- Family: Cucurbitaceae
- Genus: Melothria
- Species: M. pendula

Binomial name
- Melothria pendula L.

= Melothria pendula =

Species of flowering plant

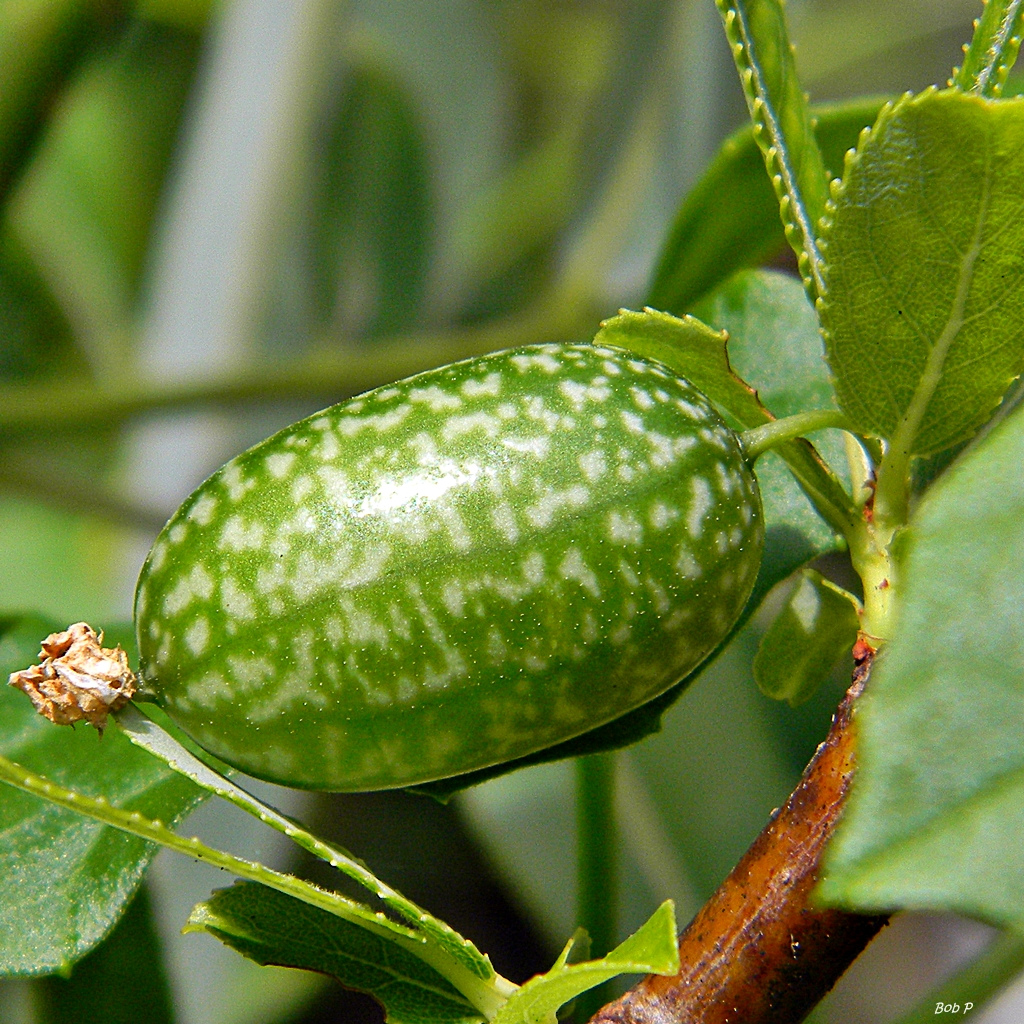
Melothria pendula fruit

Melothria pendula (commonly known as the creeping cucumber, Guadalupe cucumber, mouse melon, and meloncito) is a plant in the Benincaseae tribe. The plant is especially prominent in the Southeastern United States. The plant resembles the cultivated cucumber, possessing miniature yellow flowers, similar leaf shape, same leaf patterns, as well as similar growth patterns. The unripe berries strongly resemble minuscule watermelons.

== Etymology ==
The genus name Melothria is from Ancient Greek μηλοθρων : mēlothrōn 'kind of white grape' in reference to small grapevine fruits born by the genus. The specific name pendula means 'hanging'.

== Toxicity ==
The ripe berries, which are black, have powerful laxative qualities when consumed. The root, vines, leaves, and flowers have unknown toxicity.

== Edibility ==
The berries, when unripe and light green can be eaten raw. Dogs are known to eat the leaves without any apparent side effects.

== Ecology ==
The larvae of Hypercompe cunigunda have been recorded feeding on this plant.
