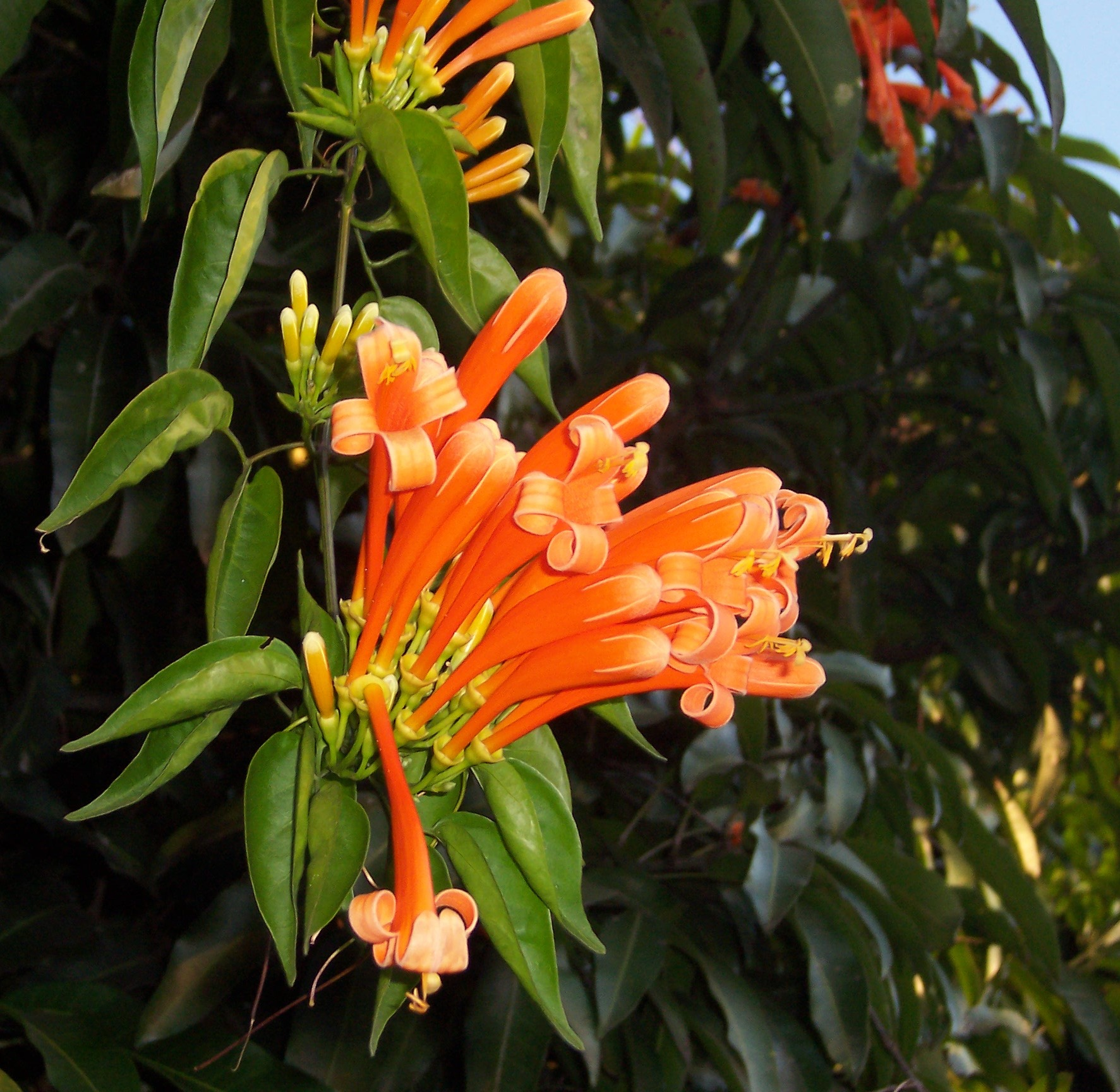

Scientific classification
- Kingdom: Plantae
- Clade: Tracheophytes
- Clade: Angiosperms
- Clade: Eudicots
- Clade: Asterids
- Order: Lamiales
- Family: Bignoniaceae
- Genus: Pyrostegia
- Species: P. venusta

Binomial name
- Pyrostegia venusta (Ker Gawl.)Miers

Synonyms
- Bignonia ignea Vell.; Bignonia tecomiflora Rusby; Bignonia tubulosa Klotzsch; Bignonia venusta Ker Gawl.; Jacaranda echinata Spreng.; Pyrostegia amabilis Miers nom. inval.; Pyrostegia dichotoma Miers ex K.Schum.; Pyrostegia ignea (Vell.) C.Presl; Pyrostegia ornata Miers nom. inval.; Pyrostegia pallida Miers nom. inval.; Pyrostegia parvifolia Miers nom. inval.; Pyrostegia puberula Miers nom. inval.; Pyrostegia reticulata Miers nom. inval.; Pyrostegia tecomiflora (Rusby) K.Schum. ex Urb.; Pyrostegia tubulosa (Klotzsch) Bureau & K.Schum.; Tecoma venusta (Ker Gawl.) Lem.; Tynanthus igneus (Vell.) Barb.Rodr.

= Pyrostegia venusta =

Species of vine

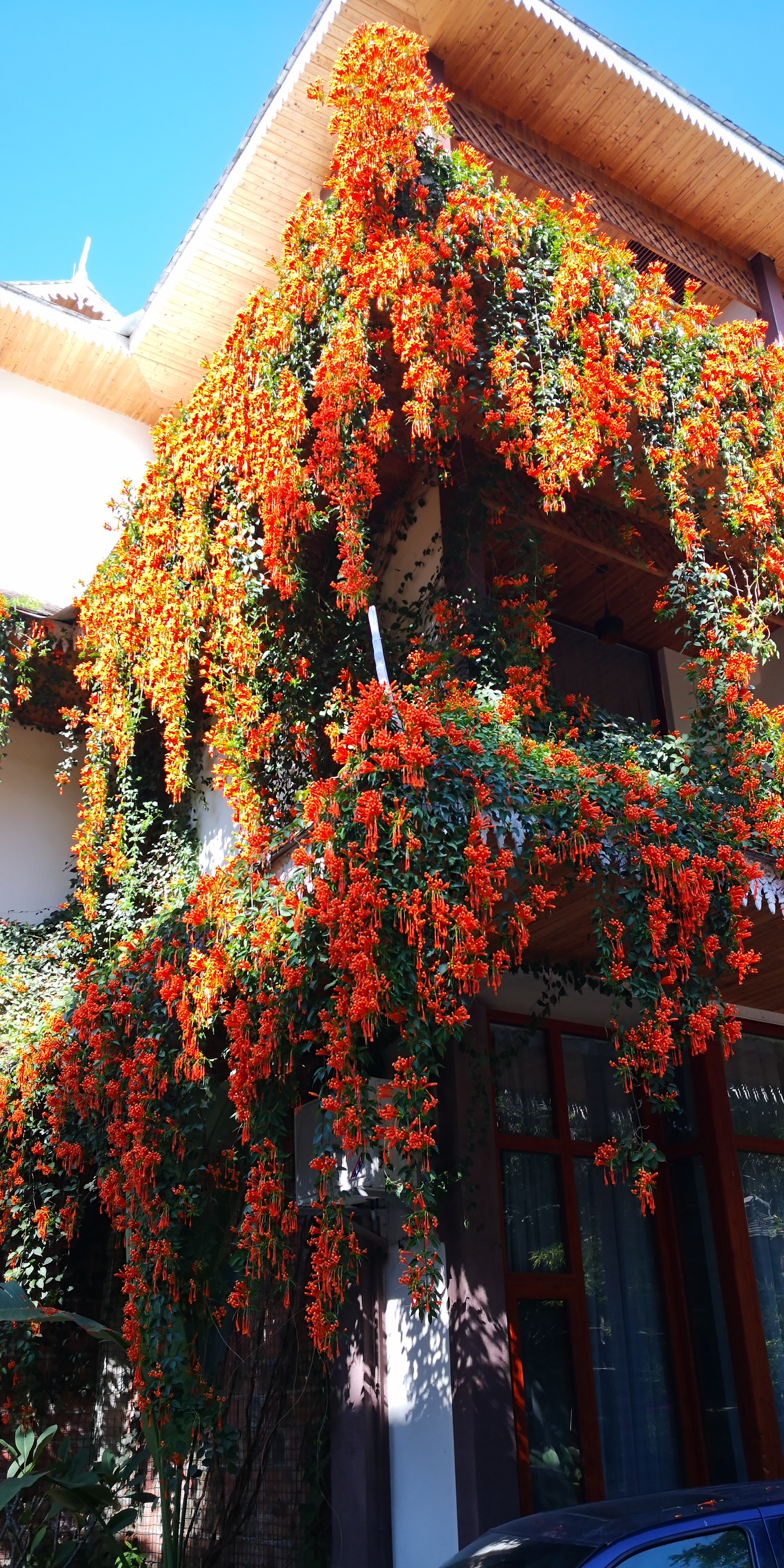
Pyrostegia venusta

Pyrostegia venusta, also commonly known as flamevine or orange trumpet vine, is a plant species of the genus Pyrostegia of the family Bignoniaceae originally native to southern Brazil, Bolivia, northeastern Argentina and Paraguay; today, it is also a widely cultivated garden species.

== Description ==
It is an evergreen or semi-deciduous, vigorously-growing climber, capable of reaching 5 m in height. The foliage is made up of opposite, pinnate leaves with two or three, 4 to 8 cm leaflets, and a 3-branched tendril, which all arise together from the end of the leaf petiole.

The orange flowers, which appear from winter to spring, are 5 to 9 cm long and densely clustered. They are pollinated by hummingbirds. The fruits are smooth, 3 cm long brown capsules.

== Cultivation ==
The plant is sensitive to cold winds and prefers sunny, sheltered locations. Its frost hardiness USDA zones are 9 to 11. It is resistant to soil salinity.

The plant has forked tendrils, which will cling to any rough surface, including brick walls. It can be grown from semi-hardwood cuttings taken in summer, autumn or winter.

It is naturalised in eastern Australia, eastern Africa and in the southeastern United States.

== Taxonomic history ==
The species was first described by John Miers in 1863.

== Etymology ==
Venusta means 'beautiful', 'charming', or 'graceful'. "Pyrostegia" is from the Greek pyros 'fire', relating to the colour of the flowers and the shape of the upper lip, and stegia 'covering'. When the flowers cover a building, it may appear to be on fire.
