= Hypercompe albiscripta =

Scientific classification
- Domain: Eukaryota
- Kingdom: Animalia
- Phylum: Arthropoda
- Class: Insecta
- Order: Lepidoptera
- Superfamily: Noctuoidea
- Family: Erebidae
- Subfamily: Arctiinae
- Genus: Hypercompe
- Species: H. albiscripta

Binomial name
- Hypercompe albiscripta (H. Druce, 1901)

Synonyms
- Ecpantheria albiscripta H. Druce, 1901

Species of moth

Hypercompe albiscripta is a moth of the family Erebidae first described by Herbert Druce in 1901. It is found in Brazil.
