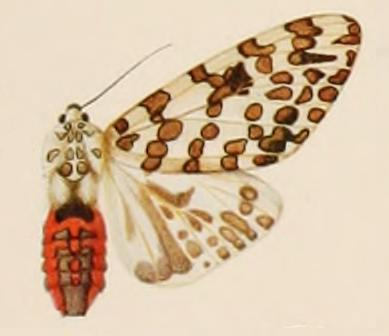

Scientific classification
- Domain: Eukaryota
- Kingdom: Animalia
- Phylum: Arthropoda
- Class: Insecta
- Order: Lepidoptera
- Superfamily: Noctuoidea
- Family: Erebidae
- Subfamily: Arctiinae
- Genus: Hypercompe
- Species: H. burmeisteri

Binomial name
- Hypercompe burmeisteri (Rothschild, 1910)

Synonyms
- Ecpantheria burmeisteri Rothschild, 1910

= Hypercompe burmeisteri =

Species of moth

Hypercompe burmeisteri is a moth of the family Erebidae first described by Walter Rothschild in 1910. It is found in Argentina.
