= Hypercompe gaujoni =

Scientific classification
- Domain: Eukaryota
- Kingdom: Animalia
- Phylum: Arthropoda
- Class: Insecta
- Order: Lepidoptera
- Superfamily: Noctuoidea
- Family: Erebidae
- Subfamily: Arctiinae
- Genus: Hypercompe
- Species: H. gaujoni

Binomial name
- Hypercompe gaujoni (Dognin, 1889)

Synonyms
- Ecpantheria gaujoni Dognin, 1889

Species of moth

Hypercompe gaujoni is a moth of the family Erebidae first described by Paul Dognin in 1889. It is found in Ecuador.
