= Hypercompe orsa =

Scientific classification
- Domain: Eukaryota
- Kingdom: Animalia
- Phylum: Arthropoda
- Class: Insecta
- Order: Lepidoptera
- Superfamily: Noctuoidea
- Family: Erebidae
- Subfamily: Arctiinae
- Genus: Hypercompe
- Species: H. orsa

Binomial name
- Hypercompe orsa (Cramer, [1777])

Synonyms
- Noctura orsa Cramer, [1777]

Species of moth

Hypercompe orsa is a moth of the family Erebidae first described by Pieter Cramer in 1777. It is found in Suriname.

The larvae have been recorded feeding on Lantana, Senecio and Sphagneticola species.
