= Hypercompe decora =

Scientific classification
- Kingdom: Animalia
- Phylum: Arthropoda
- Class: Insecta
- Order: Lepidoptera
- Superfamily: Noctuoidea
- Family: Erebidae
- Subfamily: Arctiinae
- Genus: Hypercompe
- Species: H. decora

Binomial name
- Hypercompe decora (Walker, 1855)

Synonyms
- Ecpantheria decora Walker, 1855; Ecpantheria cyaneicornis Grote, 1867; Ecpantheria haitensis Oberthür, 1881

Species of moth

Hypercompe decora is a moth of the family Erebidae first described by Francis Walker in 1855. It is found in Mexico, Cuba and Haiti.
