= Hypercompe obsolescens =

Scientific classification
- Kingdom: Animalia
- Phylum: Arthropoda
- Class: Insecta
- Order: Lepidoptera
- Superfamily: Noctuoidea
- Family: Erebidae
- Subfamily: Arctiinae
- Genus: Hypercompe
- Species: H. obsolescens

Binomial name
- Hypercompe obsolescens (Hampson, 1916)

Synonyms
- Ecpantheria obsolescens Hampson, 1916

Species of moth

Hypercompe obsolescens is a moth of the family Erebidae first described by George Hampson in 1916. It is found in Peru.
