= Hypercompe alpha =

Scientific classification
- Domain: Eukaryota
- Kingdom: Animalia
- Phylum: Arthropoda
- Class: Insecta
- Order: Lepidoptera
- Superfamily: Noctuoidea
- Family: Erebidae
- Subfamily: Arctiinae
- Genus: Hypercompe
- Species: H. alpha

Binomial name
- Hypercompe alpha (Oberthür, 1881)

Synonyms
- Ecpantheria alpha Oberthür, 1881; Ecpantheria ab. alphaeoides Strand, 1919

Species of moth

Hypercompe alpha is a moth of the family Erebidae first described by Charles Oberthür in 1881. It is found in Mexico.
