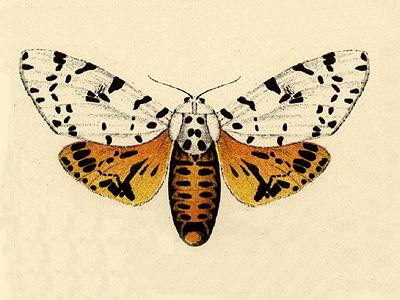

Scientific classification
- Domain: Eukaryota
- Kingdom: Animalia
- Phylum: Arthropoda
- Class: Insecta
- Order: Lepidoptera
- Superfamily: Noctuoidea
- Family: Erebidae
- Subfamily: Arctiinae
- Genus: Hypercompe
- Species: H. persola

Binomial name
- Hypercompe persola (Möschler, 1886)

Synonyms
- Ecpantheria persola Möschler, 1886

= Hypercompe persola =

Species of moth

Hypercompe persola is a moth of the family Erebidae. It is found on Jamaica.

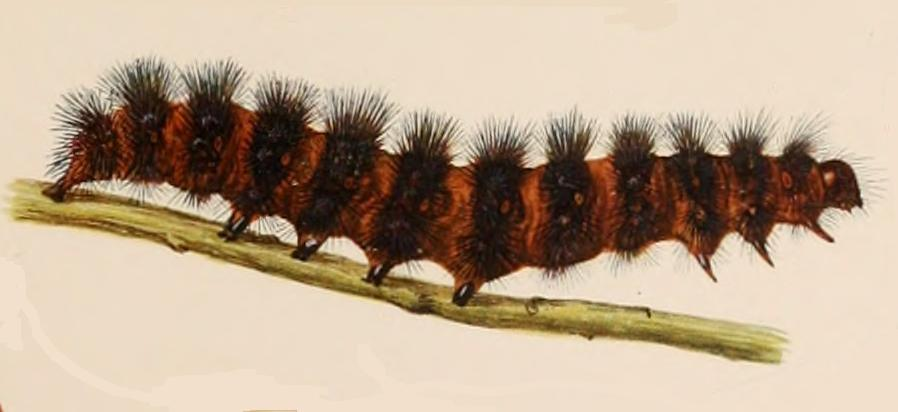
Larva
