= Hypercompe muzina =

Scientific classification
- Domain: Eukaryota
- Kingdom: Animalia
- Phylum: Arthropoda
- Class: Insecta
- Order: Lepidoptera
- Superfamily: Noctuoidea
- Family: Erebidae
- Subfamily: Arctiinae
- Genus: Hypercompe
- Species: H. muzina

Binomial name
- Hypercompe muzina (Oberthür, 1881)

Synonyms
- Ecpantheria muzina Oberthür, 1881; Ecpantheria albicollis Oberthür, 1881; Ecpantheris thiemei Oberthür, 1881; Ecpantheria depauperata Oberthür, 1881; Ecpantheria garzoni Oberthür, 1881; Ecpantheria xanthonotata Oberthür, 1881

Species of moth

Hypercompe muzina is a moth of the family Erebidae first described by Charles Oberthür in 1881. It is found from Texas and Mexico to Brazil and Colombia.

The larvae have been recorded feeding on Theobroma cacao.
