= Hypercompe bolivar =

Scientific classification
- Domain: Eukaryota
- Kingdom: Animalia
- Phylum: Arthropoda
- Class: Insecta
- Order: Lepidoptera
- Superfamily: Noctuoidea
- Family: Erebidae
- Subfamily: Arctiinae
- Genus: Hypercompe
- Species: H. bolivar

Binomial name
- Hypercompe bolivar (Oberthür, 1881)

Synonyms
- Ecpantheria bolivar Oberthür, 1881

Species of moth

Hypercompe bolivar is a moth of the family Erebidae first described by Charles Oberthür in 1881. It is found in Colombia.
