= Testaptera pertestacea =

Scientific classification
- Kingdom: Animalia
- Phylum: Arthropoda
- Clade: Pancrustacea
- Class: Insecta
- Order: Lepidoptera
- Superfamily: Noctuoidea
- Family: Erebidae
- Subfamily: Arctiinae
- Genus: Testaptera
- Species: T. pertestacea

Binomial name
- Testaptera pertestacea (Rothschild, 1935)

Synonyms
- Turuptiana pertestacea Rothschild, 1935

Species of moth

Testaptera pertestacea is a species of moth in the family Erebidae that was first described by Walter Rothschild in 1935. It is found in Peru.
