= Hypercompe cretacea =

Scientific classification
- Domain: Eukaryota
- Kingdom: Animalia
- Phylum: Arthropoda
- Class: Insecta
- Order: Lepidoptera
- Superfamily: Noctuoidea
- Family: Erebidae
- Subfamily: Arctiinae
- Genus: Hypercompe
- Species: H. cretacea

Binomial name
- Hypercompe cretacea (Dognin, 1912)

Synonyms
- Ecpantheria cretacea Dognin, 1912

Species of moth

Hypercompe cretacea is a moth of the family Erebidae first described by Paul Dognin in 1912. It is found in Colombia.
