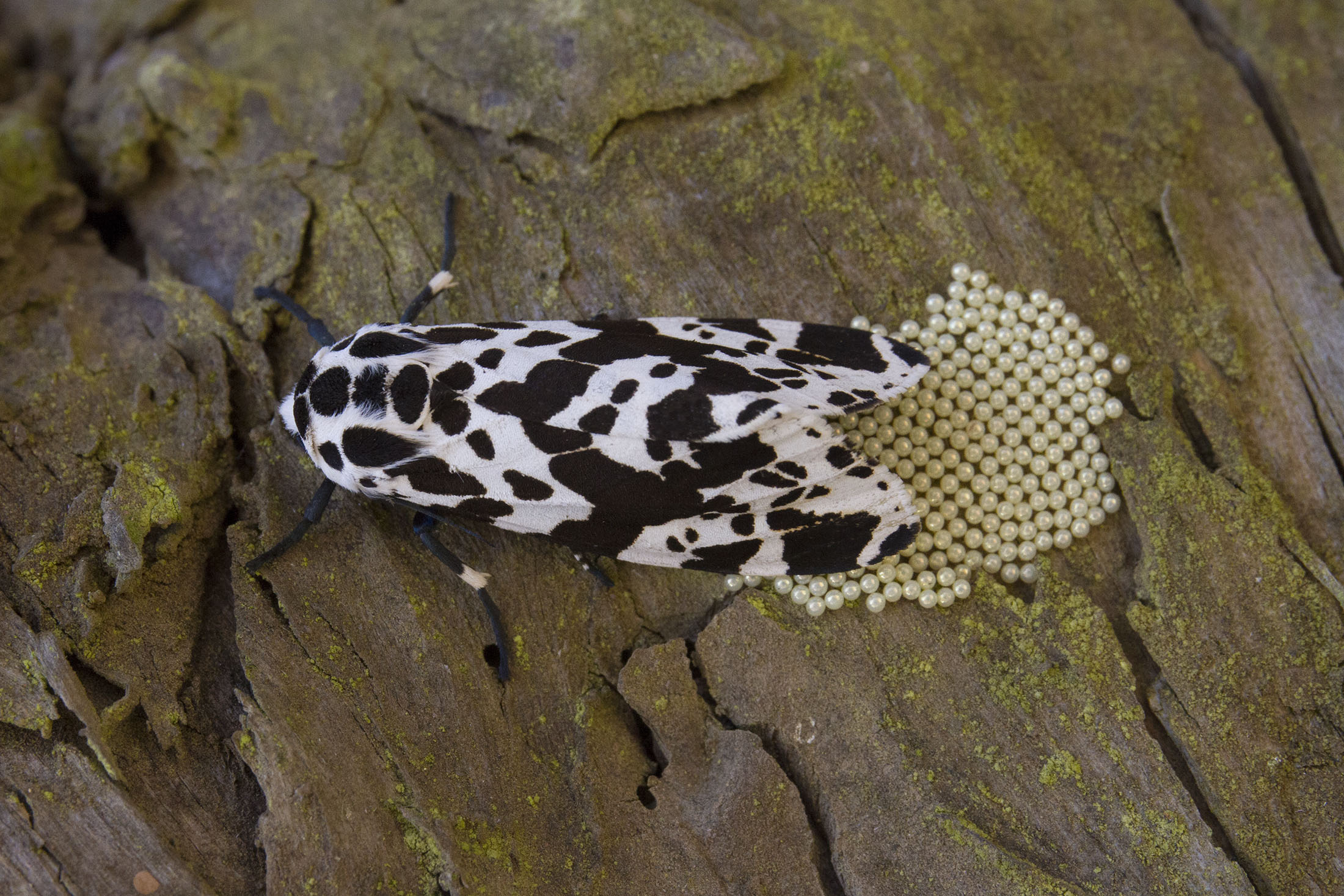
- Female laying eggs

Scientific classification
- Kingdom: Animalia
- Phylum: Arthropoda
- Clade: Pancrustacea
- Class: Insecta
- Order: Lepidoptera
- Superfamily: Noctuoidea
- Family: Erebidae
- Subfamily: Arctiinae
- Genus: Hypsocompe
- Species: H. extrema

Binomial name
- Hypsocompe extrema (Walker, 1855)

Synonyms
- Ecpantheria extrema Walker, 1855; Hypercompe extrema (Walker, 1855); Ecpantheria chilensis Oberthür, 1881

= Hypsocompe extrema =

Species of moth

Hypsocompe extrema is a species of moth in the family Erebidae. It was first described by Francis Walker in 1855 and is found in Mexico, Costa Rica and possibly Chile.

The wingspan is about 34 mm.
