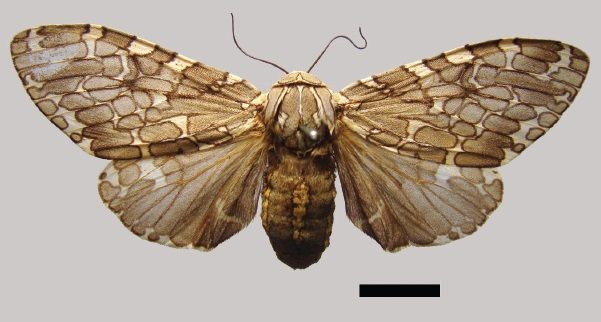

Scientific classification
- Kingdom: Animalia
- Phylum: Arthropoda
- Class: Insecta
- Order: Lepidoptera
- Superfamily: Noctuoidea
- Family: Erebidae
- Subfamily: Arctiinae
- Genus: Hypercompe
- Species: H. kinkelini

Binomial name
- Hypercompe kinkelini (Burmeister, 1880)

Synonyms
- Ecpantheria kinkelini Burmeister, 1880; Ecpantheria cincelini Hampson, 1901

= Hypercompe kinkelini =

Species of moth

Hypercompe kinkelini is a moth of the family Erebidae first described by Hermann Burmeister in 1880. It is found in Argentina.

== Etymology ==
The species is named is in honor of Kinkelin, who collected the type specimens.
