= Hypercompe obtecta =

Scientific classification
- Domain: Eukaryota
- Kingdom: Animalia
- Phylum: Arthropoda
- Class: Insecta
- Order: Lepidoptera
- Superfamily: Noctuoidea
- Family: Erebidae
- Subfamily: Arctiinae
- Genus: Hypercompe
- Species: H. obtecta

Binomial name
- Hypercompe obtecta (Dognin, 1907)

Synonyms
- Ecpantheria obtecta Dognin, 1907

Species of moth

Hypercompe obtecta is a moth of the family Erebidae first described by Paul Dognin in 1907. It is found in Argentina.
