= Hypercompe nigriloba =

Scientific classification
- Domain: Eukaryota
- Kingdom: Animalia
- Phylum: Arthropoda
- Class: Insecta
- Order: Lepidoptera
- Superfamily: Noctuoidea
- Family: Erebidae
- Subfamily: Arctiinae
- Genus: Hypercompe
- Species: H. nigriloba

Binomial name
- Hypercompe nigriloba (Hulstaert, 1924)

Synonyms
- Ecpantheria nigriloba Hulstaert, 1924

Species of moth

Hypercompe nigriloba is a moth of the family Erebidae first described by Gustaaf Hulstaert in 1924. It is found in Brazil.
