= Hypsocompe amulaensis =

Scientific classification
- Kingdom: Animalia
- Phylum: Arthropoda
- Clade: Pancrustacea
- Class: Insecta
- Order: Lepidoptera
- Superfamily: Noctuoidea
- Family: Erebidae
- Subfamily: Arctiinae
- Genus: Hypsocompe
- Species: H. amulaensis

Binomial name
- Hypsocompe amulaensis (H. Druce, 1889)

Synonyms
- Ecpantheria amulaensis H. Druce, 1889; Ecpantheria amulaensis ab. amula Strand, 1919; Hypercompe amulaensis (H. Druce, 1889)

Species of moth

Hypsocompe amulaensis is a species of moth in the family Erebidae. It was first described by Herbert Druce in 1889 and is found in Mexico.
