= Hypsocompe tenebra =

Scientific classification
- Kingdom: Animalia
- Phylum: Arthropoda
- Clade: Pancrustacea
- Class: Insecta
- Order: Lepidoptera
- Superfamily: Noctuoidea
- Family: Erebidae
- Subfamily: Arctiinae
- Genus: Hypsocompe
- Species: H. tenebra

Binomial name
- Hypsocompe tenebra (Schaus, 1894)

Synonyms
- Arachnis tenebra Schaus, 1894; Hypercompe tenebra (Schaus, 1894)

Species of moth

Hypsocompe tenebra is a species of moth in the family Erebidae. It was first described by William Schaus in 1894 and is found in Mexico.
