= Hypercompe peruvensis =

Scientific classification
- Kingdom: Animalia
- Phylum: Arthropoda
- Class: Insecta
- Order: Lepidoptera
- Superfamily: Noctuoidea
- Family: Erebidae
- Subfamily: Arctiinae
- Genus: Hypercompe
- Species: H. peruvensis

Binomial name
- Hypercompe peruvensis (Hampson, 1901)

Synonyms
- Ecpantheria peruvensis Hampson, 1901

Species of moth

Hypercompe peruvensis is a moth of the family Erebidae first described by George Hampson in 1901. It is found in Peru.
