= Hypsocompe andromela =

Scientific classification
- Kingdom: Animalia
- Phylum: Arthropoda
- Clade: Pancrustacea
- Class: Insecta
- Order: Lepidoptera
- Superfamily: Noctuoidea
- Family: Erebidae
- Subfamily: Arctiinae
- Genus: Hypsocompe
- Species: H. andromela

Binomial name
- Hypsocompe andromela (Dyar, 1909)

Synonyms
- Ecpantheria andromela Dyar, 1909; Hypercompe andromela (Dyar, 1909)

Species of moth

Hypsocompe andromela is a species of moth in the family Erebidae. It was first described by Harrison Gray Dyar Jr. in 1909 and is found in Mexico.
