= Hypercompe bari =

Scientific classification
- Domain: Eukaryota
- Kingdom: Animalia
- Phylum: Arthropoda
- Class: Insecta
- Order: Lepidoptera
- Superfamily: Noctuoidea
- Family: Erebidae
- Subfamily: Arctiinae
- Genus: Hypercompe
- Species: H. bari

Binomial name
- Hypercompe bari (Oberthür, 1881)

Synonyms
- Ecpantheria bari Oberthür, 1881; Ecpantheria dubiosa Oberthür, 1881

Species of moth

Hypercompe bari is a moth of the family Erebidae first described by Charles Oberthür in 1881. It is found in French Guiana.
