= Hypercompe dognini =

Scientific classification
- Domain: Eukaryota
- Kingdom: Animalia
- Phylum: Arthropoda
- Class: Insecta
- Order: Lepidoptera
- Superfamily: Noctuoidea
- Family: Erebidae
- Subfamily: Arctiinae
- Genus: Hypercompe
- Species: H. dognini

Binomial name
- Hypercompe dognini (Rothschild, 1910)

Synonyms
- Ecpantheria dognini Rothschild, 1910

Species of moth

Hypercompe dognini is a moth of the family Erebidae first described by Walter Rothschild in 1910. It is found in Brazil.
