= Hypercompe conspersa =

Scientific classification
- Kingdom: Animalia
- Phylum: Arthropoda
- Class: Insecta
- Order: Lepidoptera
- Superfamily: Noctuoidea
- Family: Erebidae
- Subfamily: Arctiinae
- Genus: Hypercompe
- Species: H. conspersa

Binomial name
- Hypercompe conspersa (Walker, 1866)

Synonyms
- Ecpantheria conspersa Walker, 1866

Species of moth

Hypercompe conspersa is a moth of the family Erebidae first described by Francis Walker in 1866. It is found in Colombia.
