= Hypsocompe atra =

Scientific classification
- Kingdom: Animalia
- Phylum: Arthropoda
- Clade: Pancrustacea
- Class: Insecta
- Order: Lepidoptera
- Superfamily: Noctuoidea
- Family: Erebidae
- Subfamily: Arctiinae
- Genus: Hypsocompe
- Species: H. atra

Binomial name
- Hypsocompe atra (Oberthür, 1881)

Synonyms
- Ecpantheria atra Oberthür, 1881; Hypercompe atra (Oberthür, 1881); Arctia eminens H. Edwards, 1884

Species of moth

Hypsocompe atra is a species of moth in the family Erebidae. It was first described by Charles Oberthür in 1881 and is found in Mexico.
