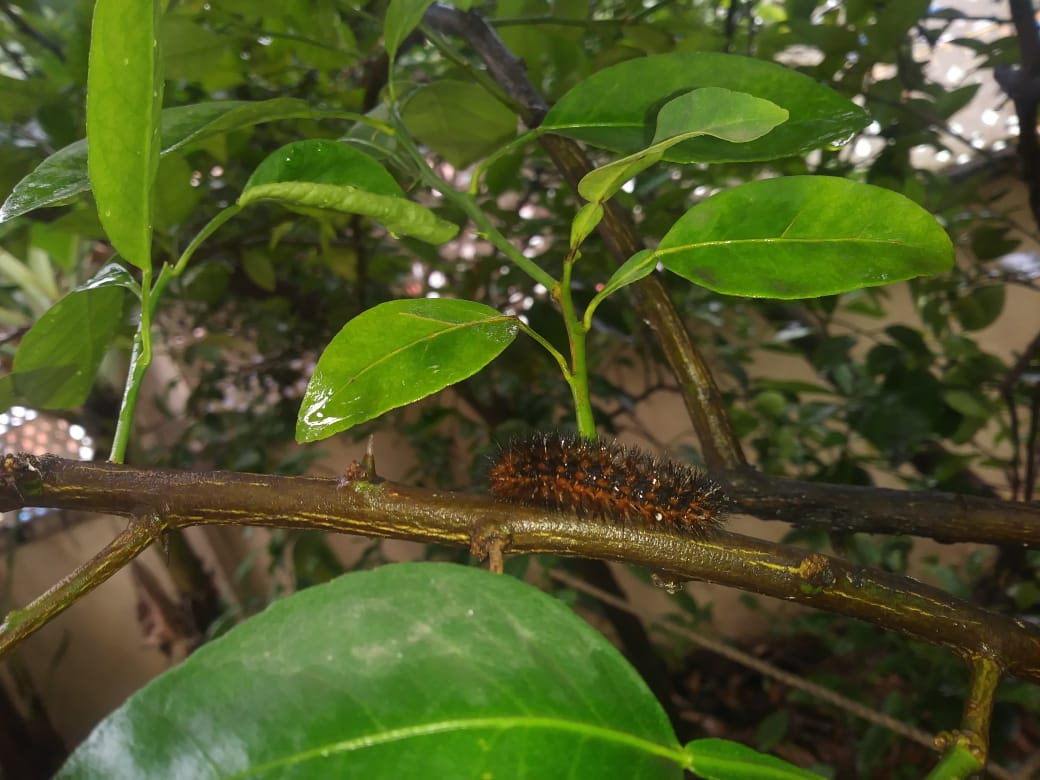

Scientific classification
- Domain: Eukaryota
- Kingdom: Animalia
- Phylum: Arthropoda
- Class: Insecta
- Order: Lepidoptera
- Superfamily: Noctuoidea
- Family: Erebidae
- Subfamily: Arctiinae
- Genus: Hypercompe
- Species: H. trinitatis

Binomial name
- Hypercompe trinitatis (Rothschild, 1910)

Synonyms
- Ecpantheria icasia trinitatis Rothschild, 1910

= Hypercompe trinitatis =

Species of moth

Hypercompe trinitatis is a moth of the family Erebidae first described by Walter Rothschild in 1910. It is found in Trinidad.
