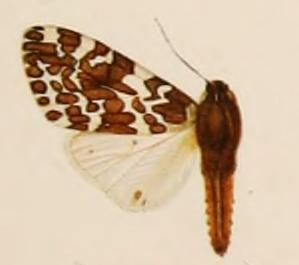

Scientific classification
- Domain: Eukaryota
- Kingdom: Animalia
- Phylum: Arthropoda
- Class: Insecta
- Order: Lepidoptera
- Superfamily: Noctuoidea
- Family: Erebidae
- Subfamily: Arctiinae
- Genus: Hypercompe
- Species: H. melanoleuca

Binomial name
- Hypercompe melanoleuca (Rothschild, 1910)

Synonyms
- Ecpantheria melanoleuca Rothschild, 1910

= Hypercompe melanoleuca =

Species of moth

Hypercompe melanoleuca is a moth of the family Erebidae first described by Walter Rothschild in 1910. It is found in Argentina.
