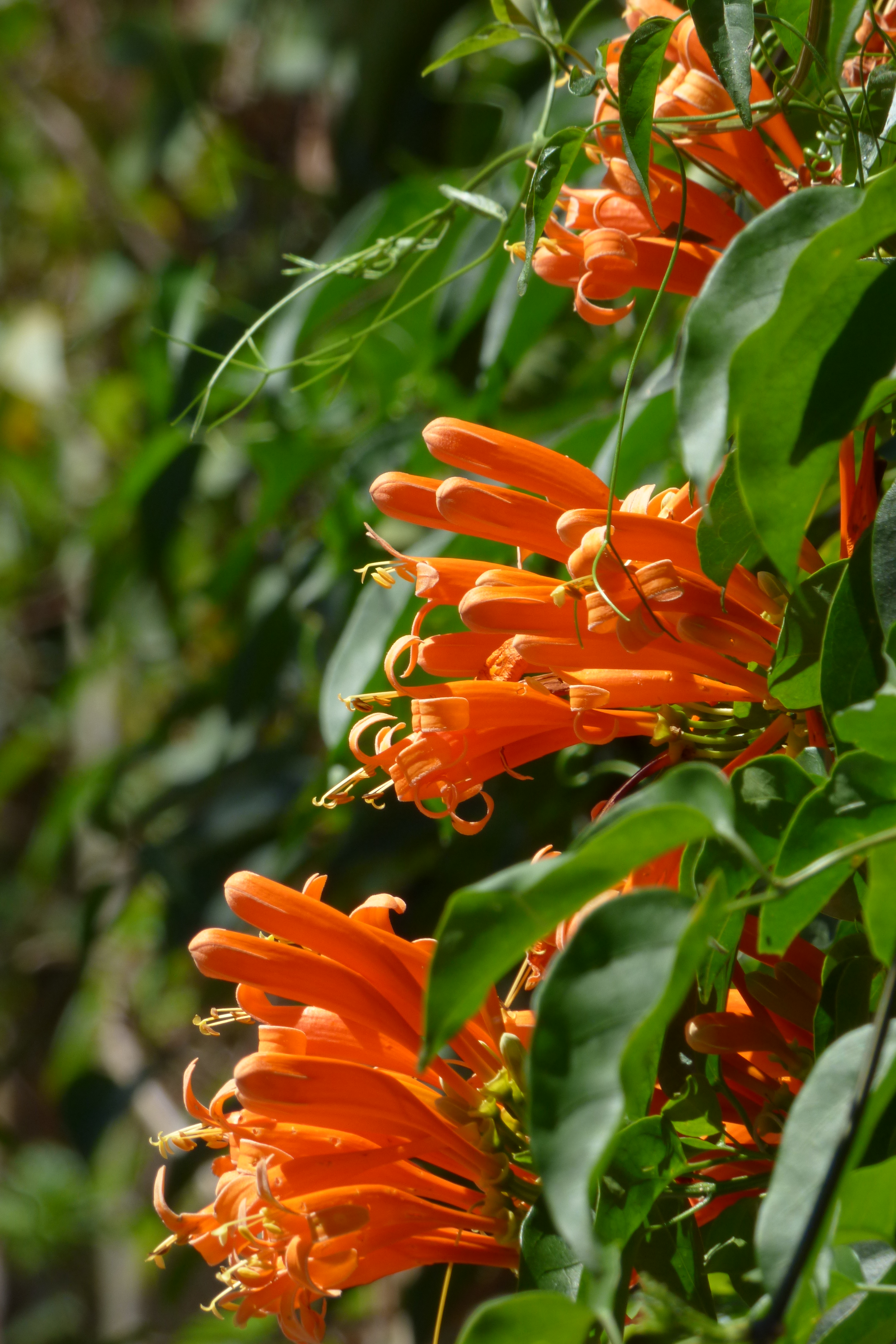
- Pyrostegia venusta

Scientific classification
- Kingdom: Plantae
- Clade: Tracheophytes
- Clade: Angiosperms
- Clade: Eudicots
- Clade: Asterids
- Order: Lamiales
- Family: Bignoniaceae
- Tribe: Bignonieae
- Genus: Pyrostegia; C.Presl

Species
- See text

= Pyrostegia =

Genus of flowering plants

Pyrostegia is a genus of plants in the family Bignoniaceae, native to tropical and subtropical areas of the Americas.

== Species ==
As of May 2020, Plants of the World Online recognises two species:

- Pyrostegia millingtonioides Sandwith
- Pyrostegia venusta (Ker Gawl.) Miers
