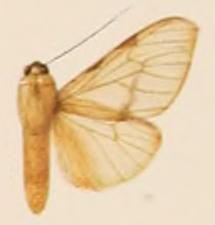

Scientific classification
- Kingdom: Animalia
- Phylum: Arthropoda
- Clade: Pancrustacea
- Class: Insecta
- Order: Lepidoptera
- Superfamily: Noctuoidea
- Family: Erebidae
- Subfamily: Arctiinae
- Genus: Testaptera
- Species: T. testacea

Binomial name
- Testaptera testacea (Rothschild, 1909)

Synonyms
- Automolis testacea Rothschild, 1909; Hypercompe testacea (Rothschild, 1909)

= Testaptera testacea =

Species of moth

Testaptera testacea is a species of moth in the family Erebidae that was first described by Walter Rothschild in 1909. It is found in Peru.
