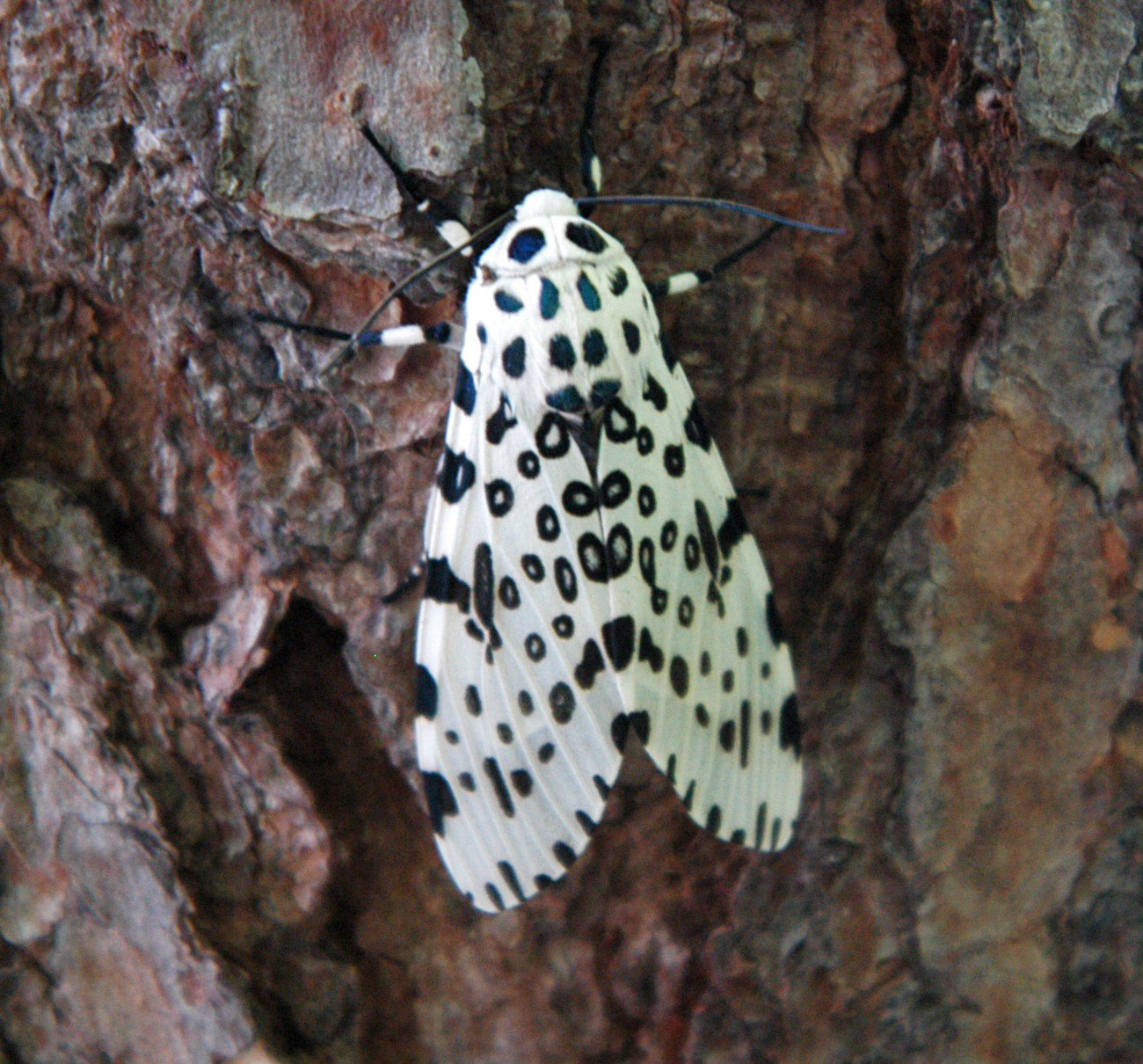
- Giant leopard moth, Hypercompe scribonia

Scientific classification
- Kingdom: Animalia
- Phylum: Arthropoda
- Clade: Pancrustacea
- Class: Insecta
- Order: Lepidoptera
- Superfamily: Noctuoidea
- Family: Erebidae
- Subfamily: Arctiinae
- Subtribe: Spilosomina
- Genus: Hypercompe; Hübner, 1819

Type species
- Phalaena icasia Cramer, 1777

Synonyms
- Ecpantheria Hübner, 1820; Agaposoma C. Felder, 1874

= Hypercompe =

Genus of moths

Hypercompe is a genus of tiger moths in the family Erebidae erected by Jacob Hübner in 1819.

== Taxonomy ==
The species of the former subgenus Catenina are now considered as a distinct genus. Several species were formerly separated in Ecpantheria, which is now regarded as a junior synonym.

== Species ==
The genus includes the following species:

- Hypercompe abdominalis
- Hypercompe albicornis
- Hypercompe albiscripta
- Hypercompe alpha
- Hypercompe anomala
- Hypercompe bari
- Hypercompe bolivar
- Hypercompe burmeisteri
- Hypercompe campinasa
- Hypercompe caudata (Walker, 1855)
- Hypercompe chelifer
- Hypercompe conspersa
- Hypercompe cretacea
- Hypercompe cunigunda
- Hypercompe decora
- Hypercompe deflorata
- Hypercompe detecta
- Hypercompe dognini
- Hypercompe dubia
- Hypercompe eridanus
- Hypercompe euripides
- Hypercompe flavopunctata
- Hypercompe ganglio
- Hypercompe gaujoni
- Hypercompe icasia
- Hypercompe indecisa
- Hypercompe jaguarina
- Hypercompe kinkelini
- Hypercompe melanoleuca
- Hypercompe mielkei
- Hypercompe muzina
- Hypercompe nigriloba
- Hypercompe nigriplaga
- Hypercompe obsolescens
- Hypercompe obtecta
- Hypercompe ocularia
- Hypercompe orbiculata
- Hypercompe orsa
- Hypercompe perplexa
- Hypercompe persola
- Hypercompe peruvensis
- Hypercompe robusta
- Hypercompe scribonia (Stoll, [1790]), giant leopard moth
- Hypercompe simplex
- Hypercompe theophila
- Hypercompe trinitatis
