= Melanoleuca (disambiguation) =

Melanoleuca is a genus of mushrooms in the family Tricholomataceae.

Melanoleuca, derived from the Ancient Greek melano- meaning "black", and leukos meaning "white", may refer to:

- Melanoleuca, a junior synonym of the moth genus Ethmia
- Ailuropoda melanoleuca, the binomial name of the giant panda
