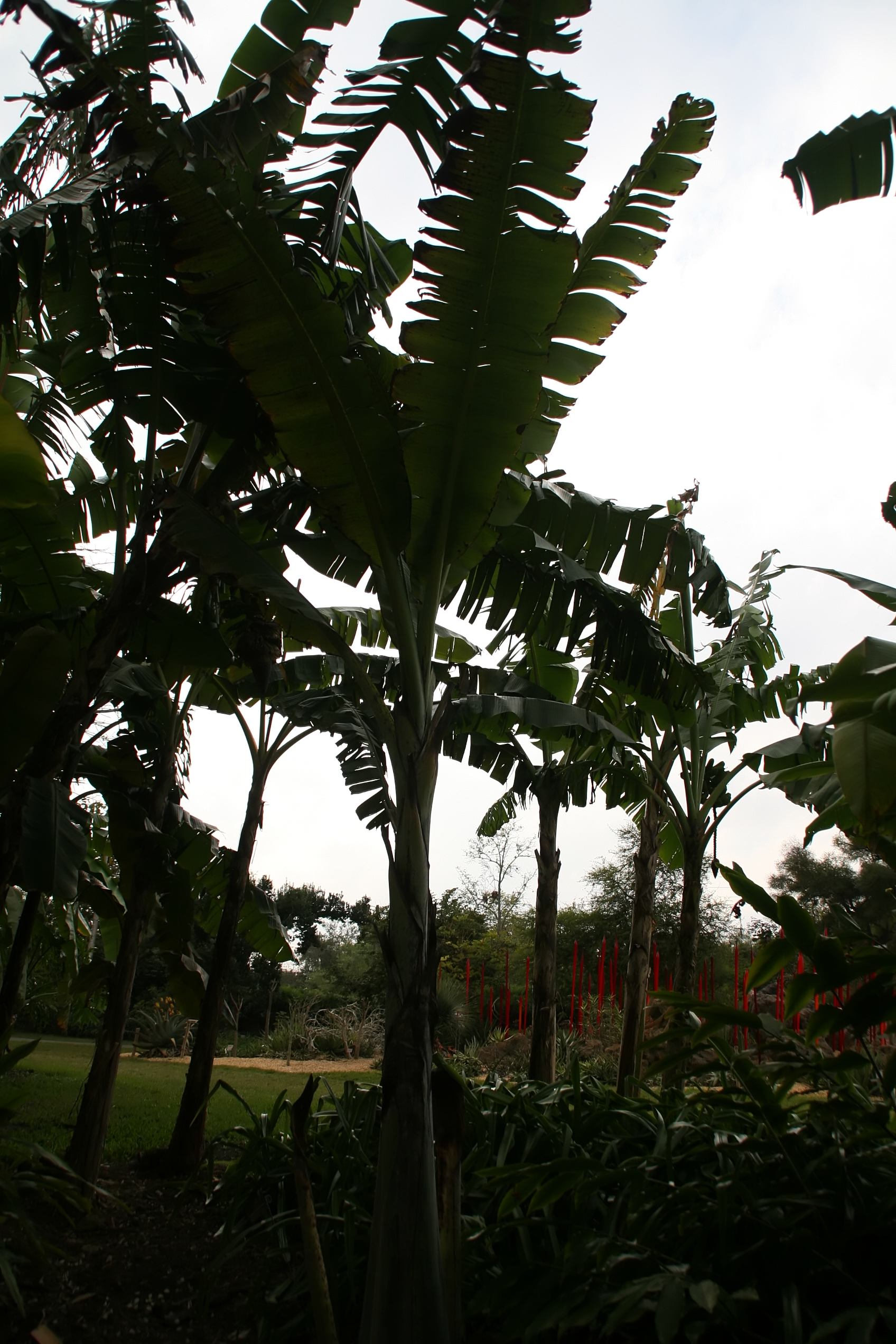
- At Fairchild Tropical Botanic Garden, Miami

Conservation status
- Least Concern (IUCN 3.1)

Scientific classification
- Kingdom: Plantae
- Clade: Tracheophytes
- Clade: Angiosperms
- Clade: Monocots
- Clade: Commelinids
- Order: Zingiberales
- Family: Musaceae
- Genus: Ensete
- Species: E. glaucum

Binomial name
- Ensete glaucum (Roxb.) Cheesman

= Ensete glaucum =

Species of flowering plant

Ensete glaucum, the snow banana, has also been classified as Musa nepalensis, Ensete giganteum, or Ensete wilsonii.

== Distribution ==
This gigantic monocarpic herbaceous plant is native to China, Nepal, India, Myanmar (Burma), Vietnam and Thailand. It is also native to Indonesia, Malaysia, Papua New Guinea, the Philippines and Taiwan. It grows from 800–1,200 m (3,000–4,000 ft) in elevation.

== Description ==
Ensete glaucum has a thick, waxy with sometimes bluish tinge, solitary pseudostem. It grows larger than the Abyssinian banana (Ensete ventricosum).

Its leaves are 1.4–1.8 m (5–6 ft) long and 50–60 cm (20–24 in) wide.

== Cultivation and uses ==
The plant is cultivated as an ornamental plant, for its unique swollen bulbous base and large leaves and is used to feed pigs in parts of China.

In India the pulp of the fruit is eaten, considered highly medicinal, and given to infants and patients. Young shoots and a flowering part are eaten as a vegetable. The plant is used in religious and domestic celebrations.

It is easy to raise from seed. It is an extremely fast growing banana given heat, but not as hardy as the Abyssinian banana (Ensete ventricosum), and is not as well known.
