= Ensete perrieri =

Conservation status
- Critically Endangered (IUCN 3.1)

Scientific classification
- Kingdom: Plantae
- Clade: Tracheophytes
- Clade: Angiosperms
- Clade: Monocots
- Clade: Commelinids
- Order: Zingiberales
- Family: Musaceae
- Genus: Ensete
- Species: E. perrieri

Binomial name
- Ensete perrieri (Claverie) Cheesman

Rare species of banana

Ensete perrieri, or the Madagascar banana, is a species of banana exclusively found in western Madagascar. The Madagascar banana is listed as critically endangered because of deforestation and climate change. Some botanists believe that the Madagascar banana is a potential source of resistance to Panama disease, which wiped out the Gros Michel banana, and threatens the Cavendish banana, which is the main banana of international commerce.

== Description ==
The Madagascar banana is a tree-like herbaceous plant. It loses all of its leaves in the dry season with only a pseudostem of leaf-sheaths remaining.

A typical Madagascar banana tree is 5 to 6 metres (16 to 20 ft) high, with a trunk swollen at the base into a thick tuber 2.5 m (8 ft 2 in) in circumference. The roots are white, cylindrical and thick. The stem is surrounded by persistent leaf sheaths and thus takes on the appearance of a large trunk swollen at its base. It measures, on average, 2 m (6 ft 7 in) in circumference at the collar, 2.5 m (8 ft 2 in) a little higher (at a distance of 50 centimetres (20 in)), only 0.7 m (2 ft 4 in) at the level of the lower leaves.

== Uses ==
Because of its large seeds, it is not palatable to eat. However, it may be possible to breed edible bananas with it. A traditional Malagasy use of the banana in southwest Madagascar is to grind the stems to a powder as a treatment for stomach-ache.

== Taxonomy ==
A specimen was collected in Betsiboka in 1905 by a French botanist named Pierre Claverie, and is kept in a herbarium in the National Museum of Natural History, France. The Madagascar banana is named after a French botanist, Joseph Marie Henry Alfred Perrier de la Bâthie, and was originally classified in the genus Musa, but was later reclassified as Ensete by Ernest Entwistle Cheesman. The Madagascar banana is a relative of the Abyssinian banana (Ensete ventricosum).

== Habitat and cultivation ==
Madagascar bananas are native to the dry tropical forests of western Madagascar, and in 2018, it was thought by botanists at Kew Gardens that there were only three known mature Madagascar banana trees left, but seedlings have been seen. The Madagascar banana has a genetic trait that allows it to be resistant to diseases. Madagascar bananas can be found within the Tsingy de Bemaraha Strict Nature Reserve.

== See also ==
- Red banana
- Blue Java banana
- Flora of Madagascar
