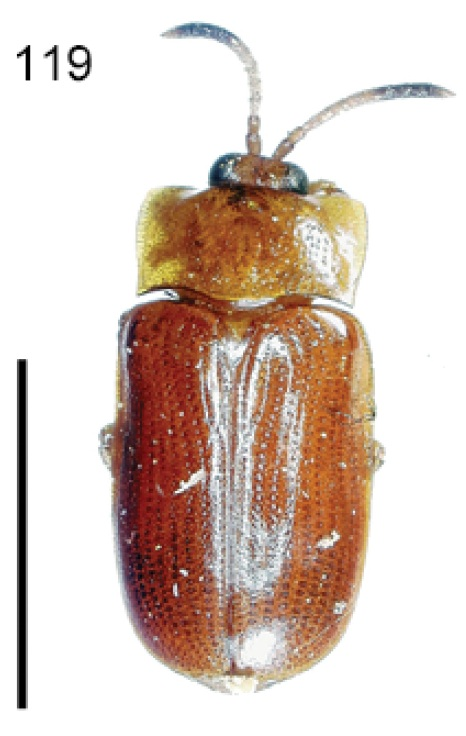

Scientific classification
- Kingdom: Animalia
- Phylum: Arthropoda
- Class: Insecta
- Order: Coleoptera
- Suborder: Polyphaga
- Infraorder: Cucujiformia
- Family: Chrysomelidae
- Genus: Cephaloleia
- Species: C. dilaticollis

Binomial name
- Cephaloleia dilaticollis Baly, 1858

Synonyms
- Cephalolia laticollis Baly, 1869; Cephalolia abscisa Uhmann, 1936

= Cephaloleia dilaticollis =

Species of beetle

Cephaloleia dilaticollis is a species of beetle of the family Chrysomelidae. It is found in Bolivia, Brazil, Colombia, Costa Rica, Ecuador, Mexico, Nicaragua, Panama, Peru and Venezuela.

== Description ==
Adults reach a length of about 4.3–4.6 mm. Adults are reddish brown, with the eyes and apical four antennomeres darker.

== Biology ==
Adults have been collected on Musaceae and Calathea insignis.
