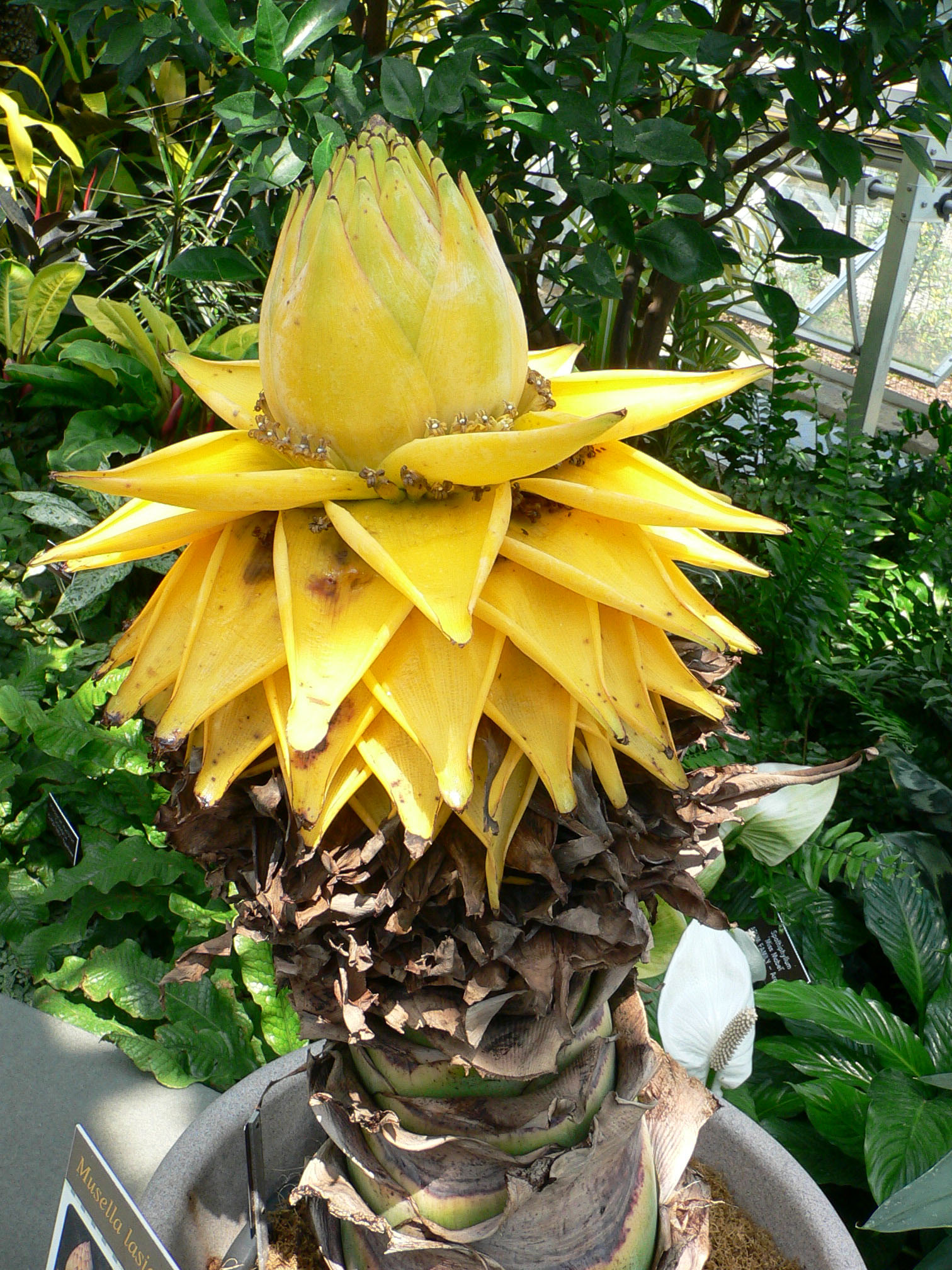

Conservation status
- Endangered (IUCN 3.1)

Scientific classification
- Kingdom: Plantae
- Clade: Tracheophytes
- Clade: Angiosperms
- Clade: Monocots
- Clade: Commelinids
- Order: Zingiberales
- Family: Musaceae
- Genus: Musella (Franch.) C.Y.Wu ex H.W.Li
- Species: M. lasiocarpa

Binomial name
- Musella lasiocarpa (Franch.) C.Y.Wu ex H.W.Li

Synonyms (Note: Musa lasiocarpa (the basionym of Ensete lasiocarpum) was originally described and published in Journal de Botanique (Morot) 3(20): 330–331, f. 1. 1889.)
- Ensete lasiocarpum (Franch.) Cheesman; Musa lasiocarpa Franch. (basionym); Musella splendida R.V.Valmayor & L.D.Danh

= Musella lasiocarpa =

Chinese dwarf banana

Species of tree

Musella lasiocarpa (syn. Musa lasiocarpa), commonly known as Chinese dwarf banana, golden lotus banana or Chinese yellow banana, is the sole species in the genus Musella. It is thus a close relative of bananas, and also a member of the family Musaceae.

== Description ==
It is known for its erect, yellow pseudostems (see image), generally appearing during the second year of cultivation, that can last a few months. Just before opening, the yellow, flower-like pseudostem resembles a lotus - from which the plant gets one of its names.

== Distribution and habitat ==
The plant is native to Sichuan, Guizhou and Yunnan Provinces in China, and Vietnam, where it grows high in the mountains to altitudes of over 2,000 m (6,600 ft).

== Horticulture ==
Under its synonym Musa lasiocarpa, this plant has won the Royal Horticultural Society's Award of Garden Merit. It can be grown outside, but requires protection from freezing temperatures.

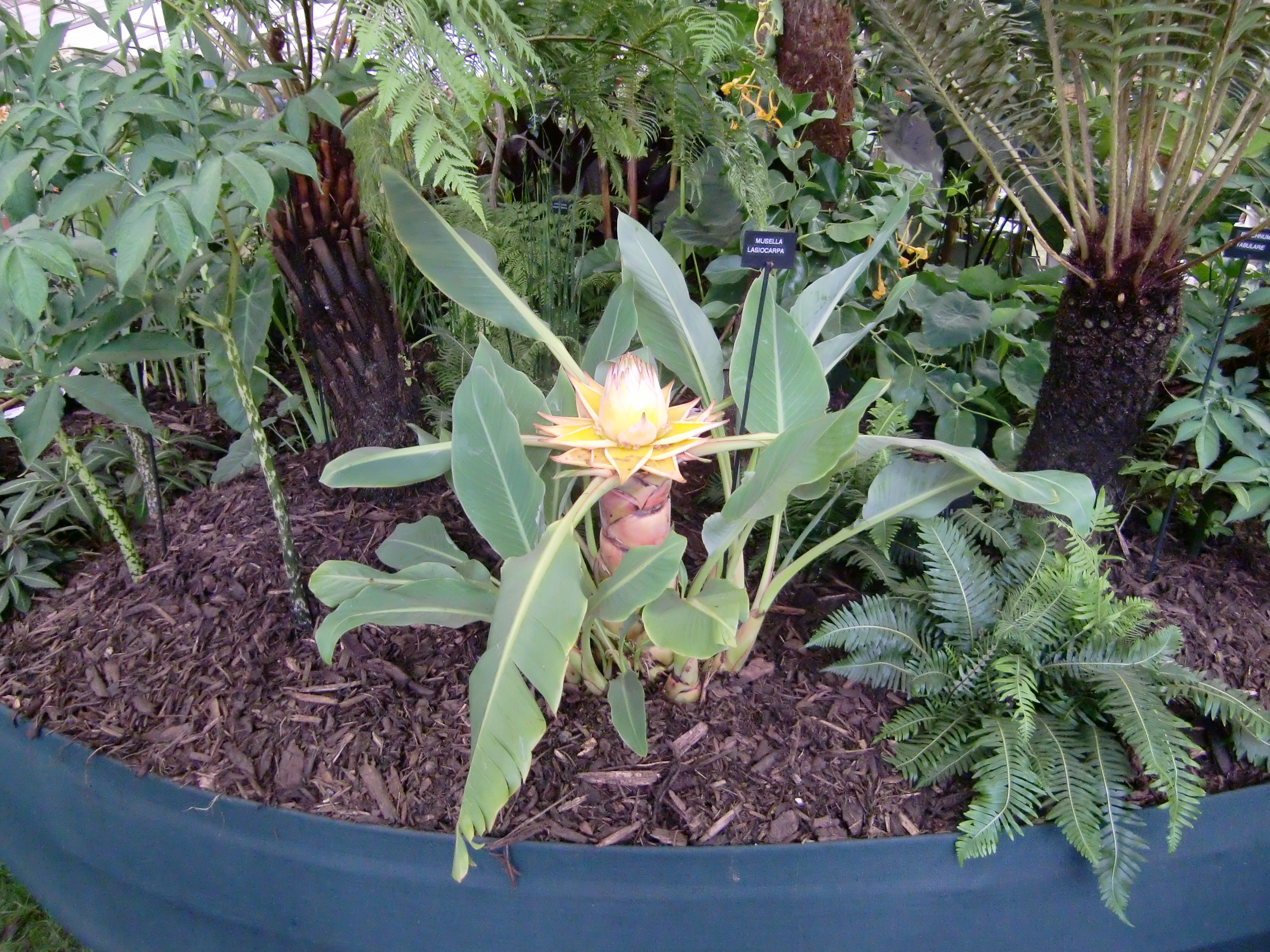

== See also ==
- List of hardy bananas
