= Cenizo =

Cenizo can refer to:

- Leucophyllum frutescens, plant sometimes called cenizo
- Blue Java banana, a banana cultivar sometimes called cenizo in Central America
- El Cenizo, Texas, town in Texas
- Cenizo, a band of Coahuiltecan Native Americans
