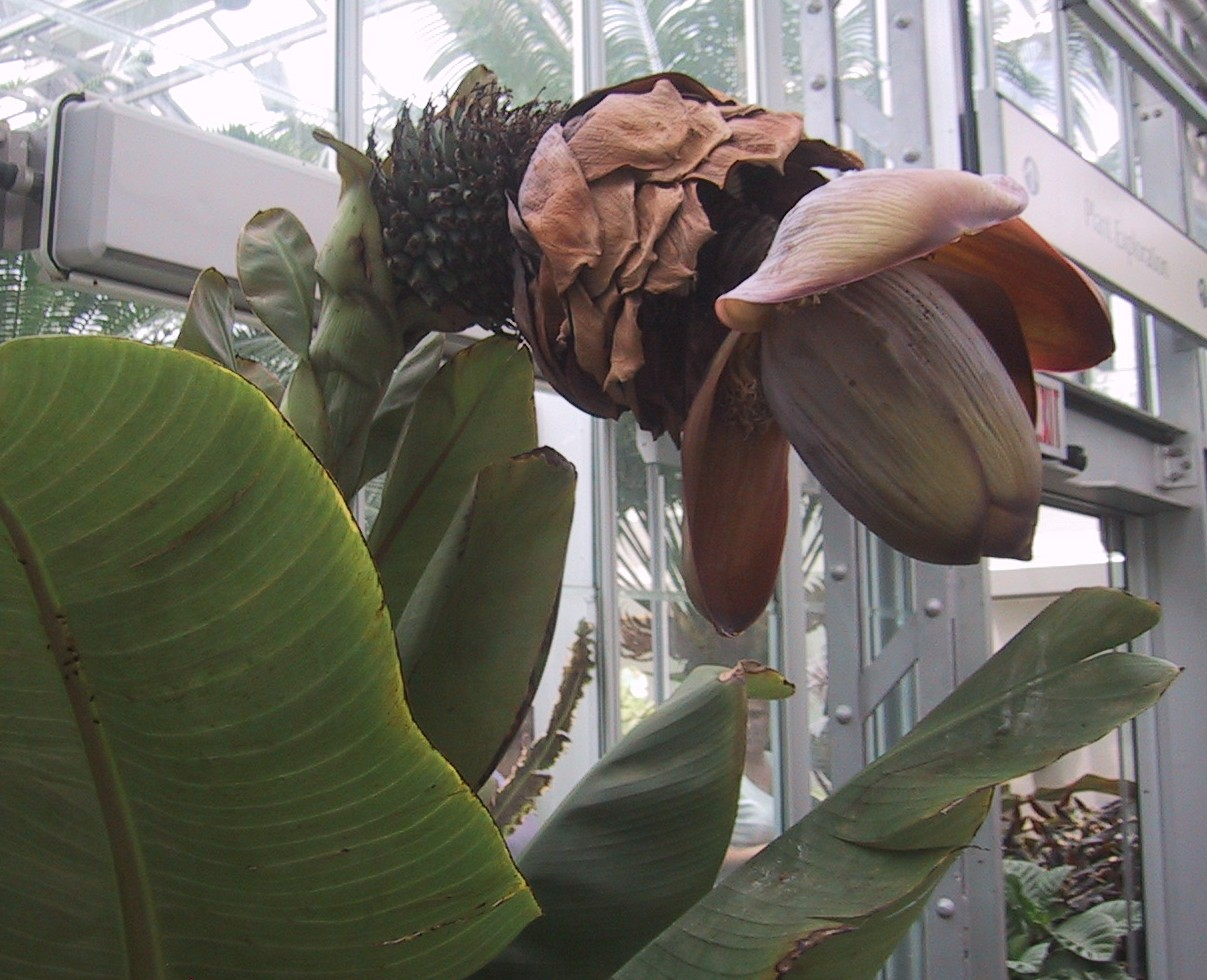
- At the United States Botanic Garden

Conservation status
- Near Threatened (IUCN 3.1)

Scientific classification
- Kingdom: Plantae
- Clade: Tracheophytes
- Clade: Angiosperms
- Clade: Monocots
- Clade: Commelinids
- Order: Zingiberales
- Family: Musaceae
- Genus: Ensete
- Species: E. superbum

Binomial name
- Ensete superbum Roxb.

Synonyms
- Musa superba Roxb.

= Ensete superbum =

Species of banana

Ensete superbum is a species of banana from India.

== Distribution ==
The plant is well-known from the Western Ghats, Anaimalai Hills, some other South Indian hills in Dindigul and other parts of the peninsular India. It has also been recorded from Jhadol and Ogna forest ranges in Rajasthan, North India. There are also reports of a similar species in Thailand, but it is yet to be formally described.

== Description ==
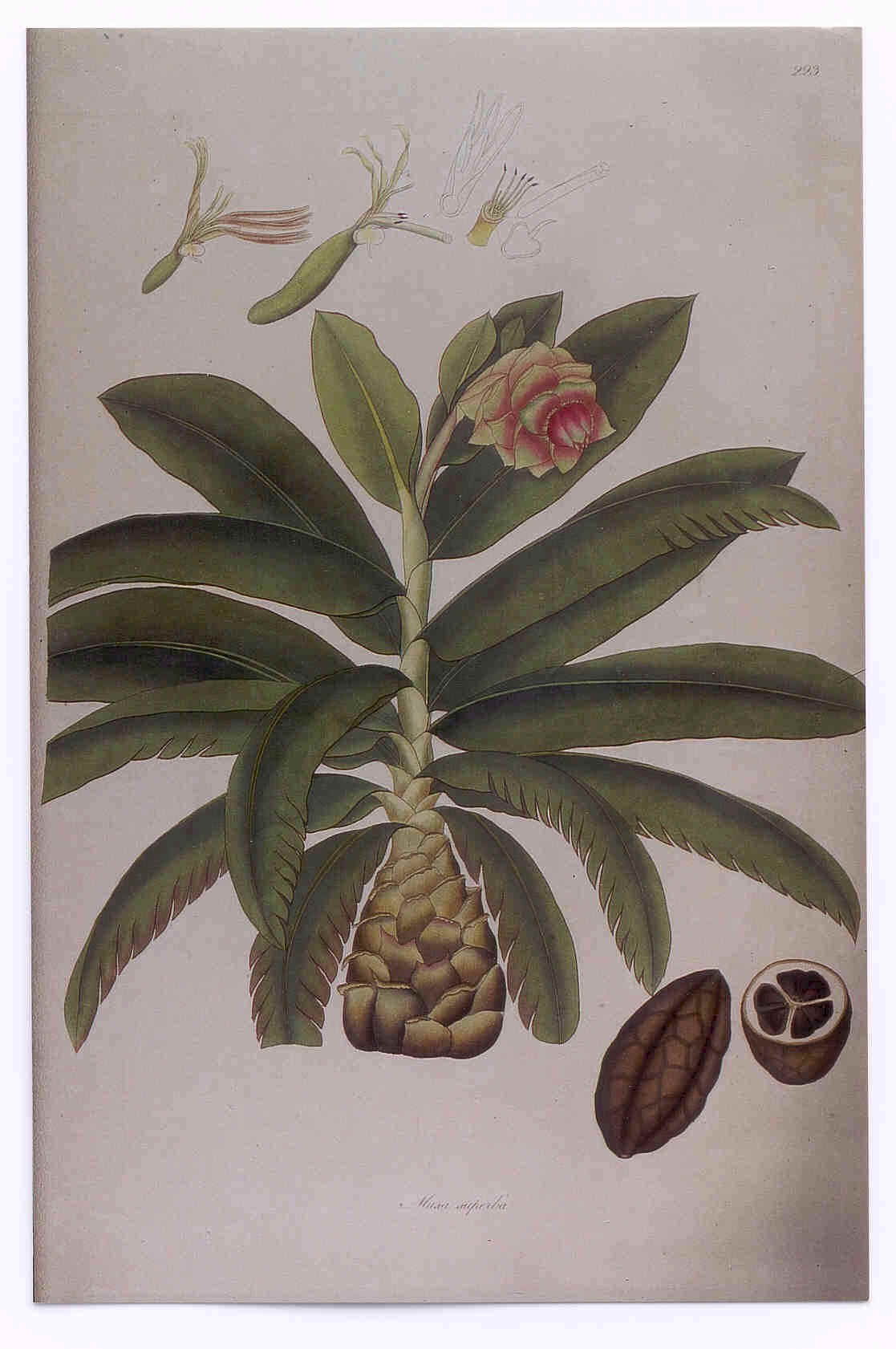
A page from William Roxburgh's Plants of the Coast of Coromandel, Vol. 3 with drawings of Ensete superbum

Plants may grow up to 3,7 m (12 f) high, the pseudostem may be up to half the height with a swollen base of up to 2,5 m (8 ft) in circumference at the base. The leaves are bright green in on both sides with a deeply grooved and short petiole. The leaf sheaths are persistent at the base and leave closely set scars on the corm. The fruits are slightly less than 8 cm (3 inches) long and more or less triangular with dark brown seeds. The upper parts of the plant die out during the dry season leaving the corm, which forms new leaves at the beginning of the monsoon.

== Gallery ==
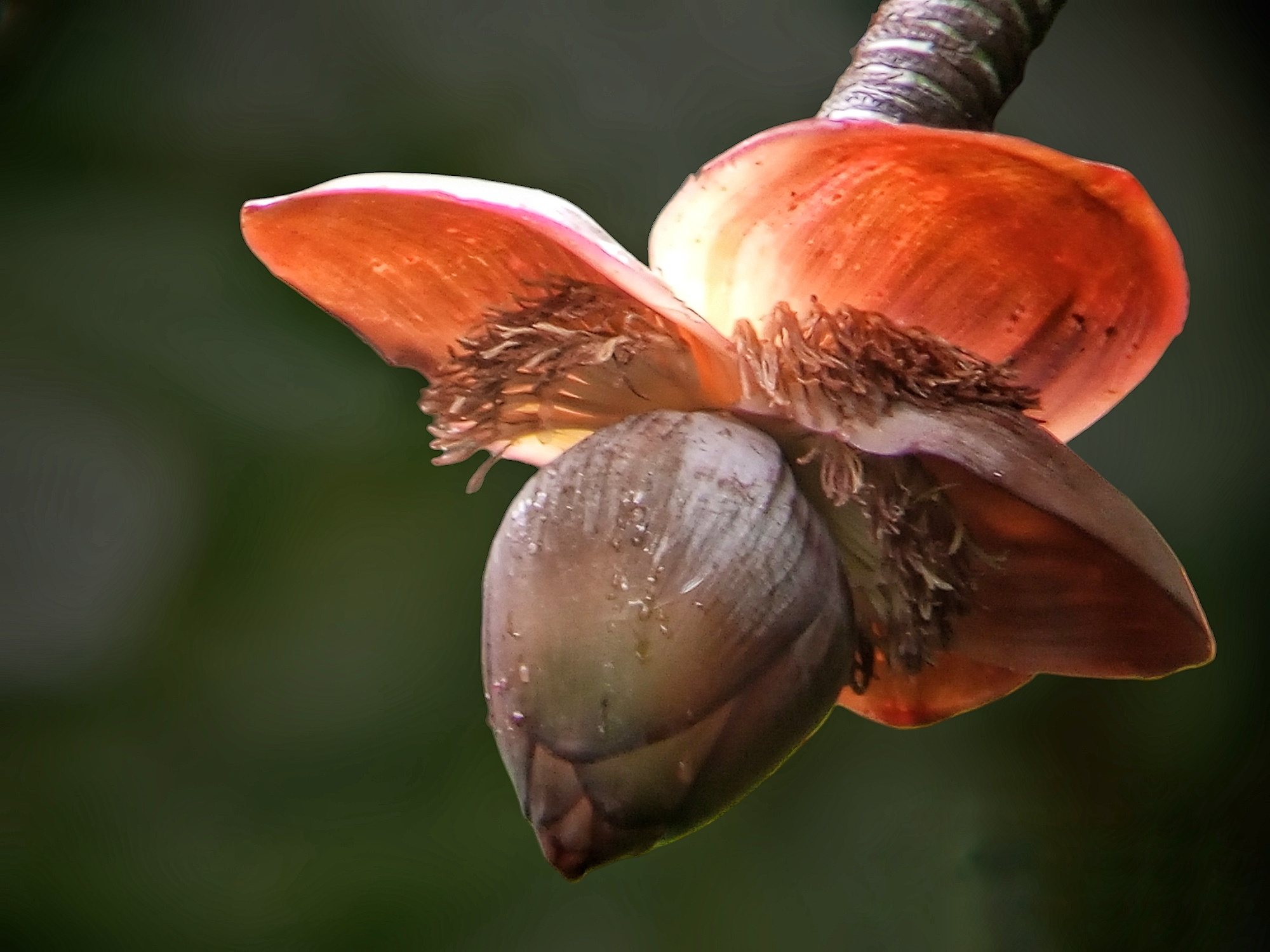
Flower detail

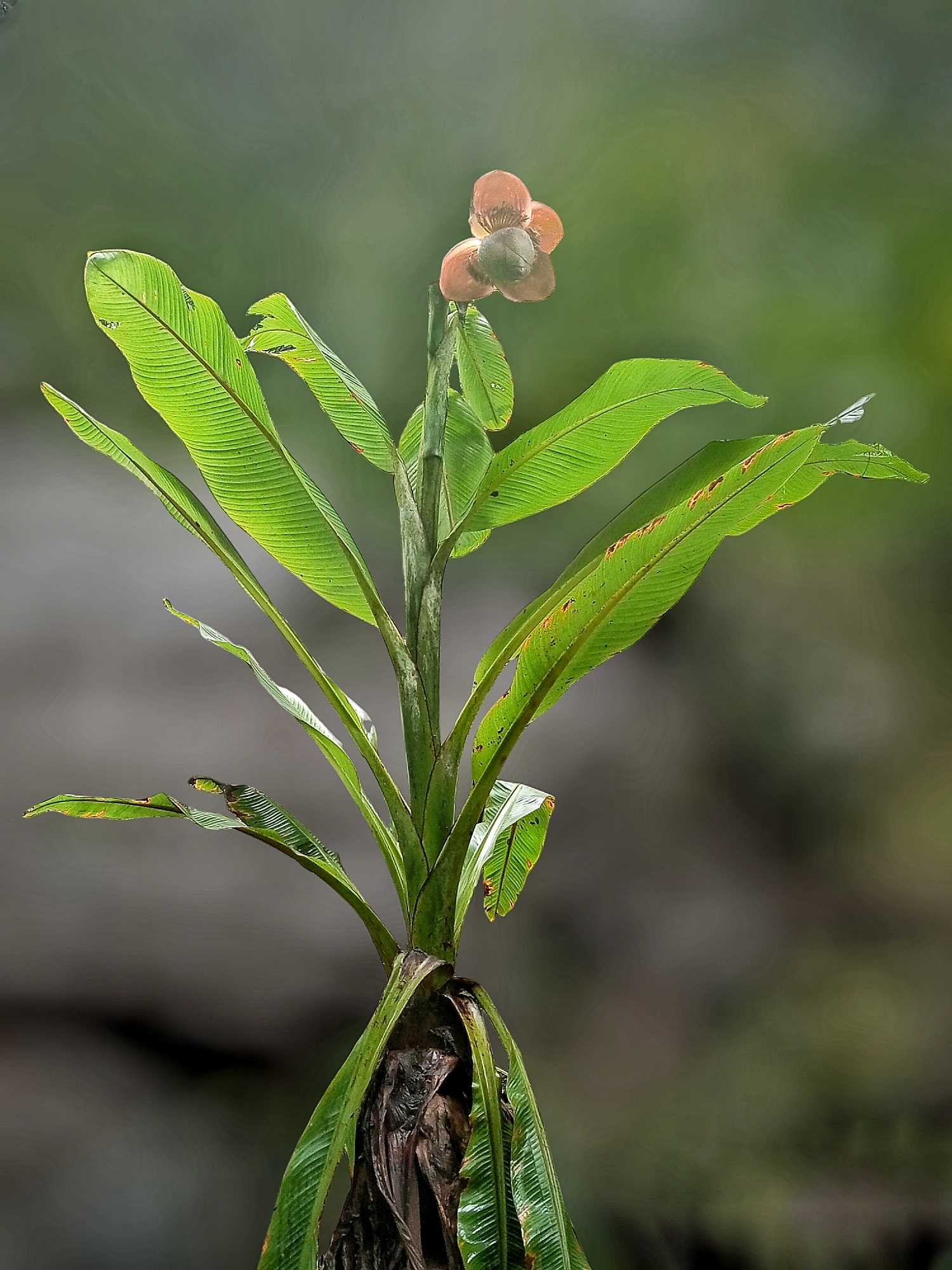
Ensete superbum at Western Ghats Mountains

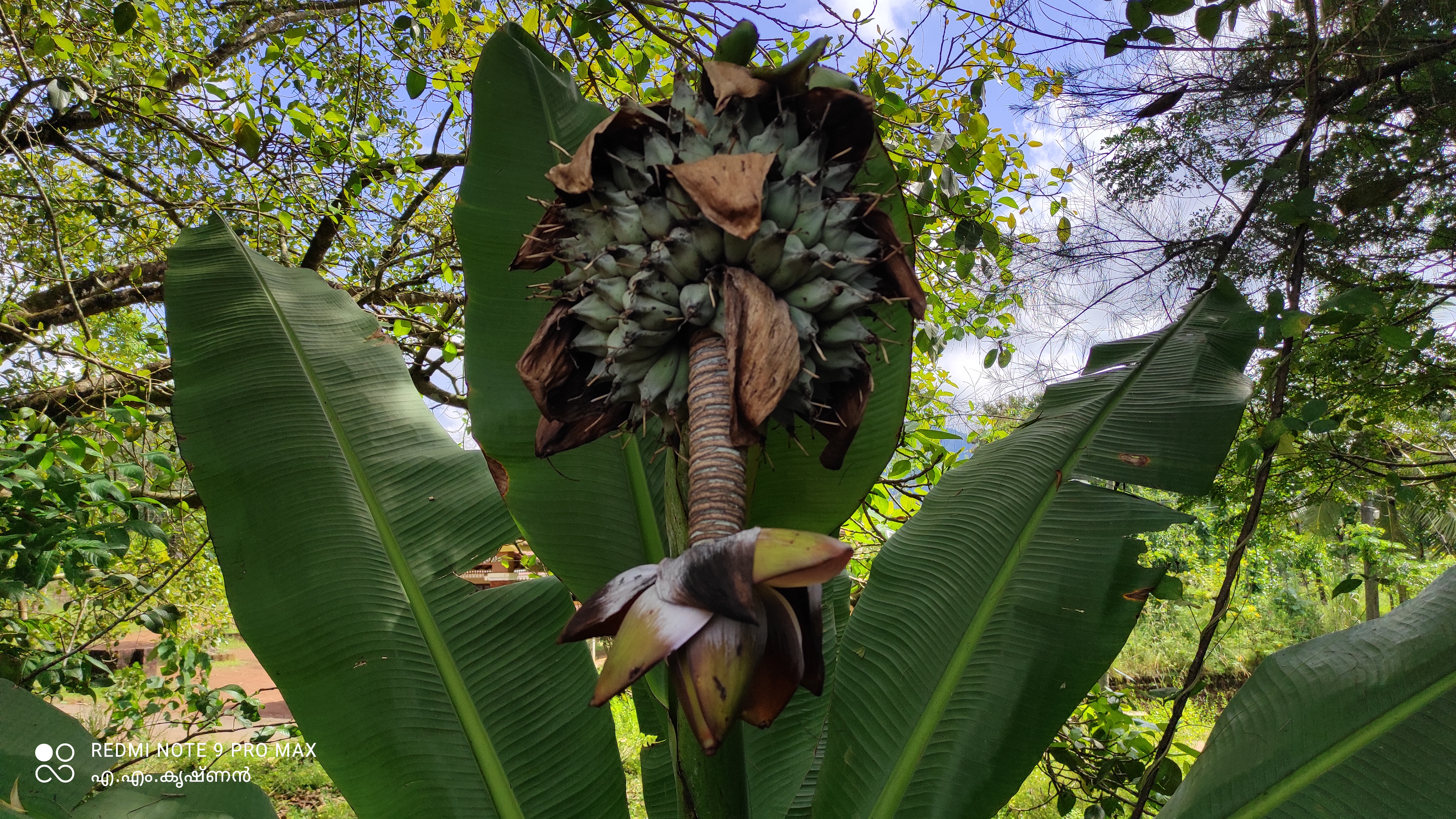
Fruit detail

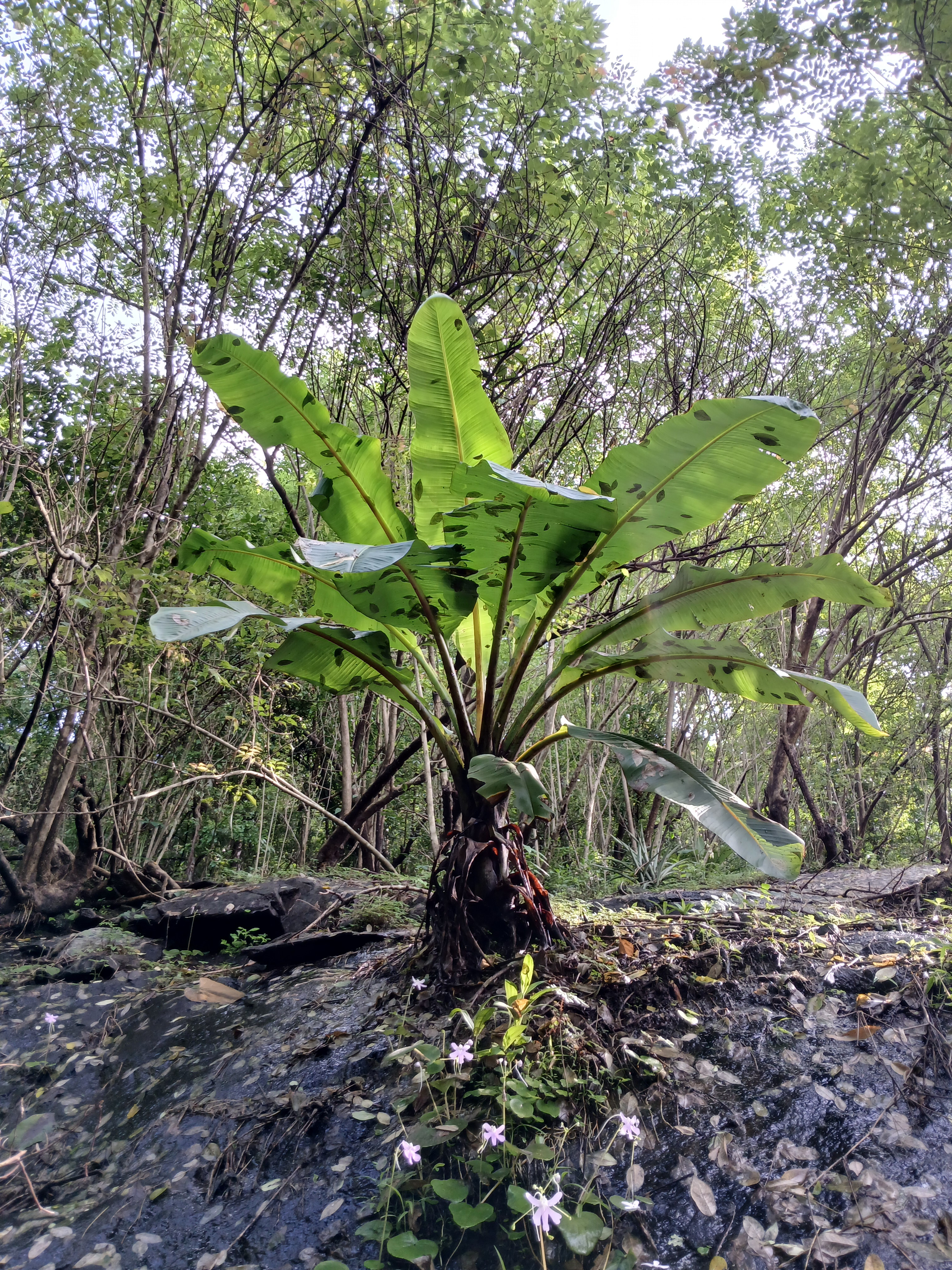

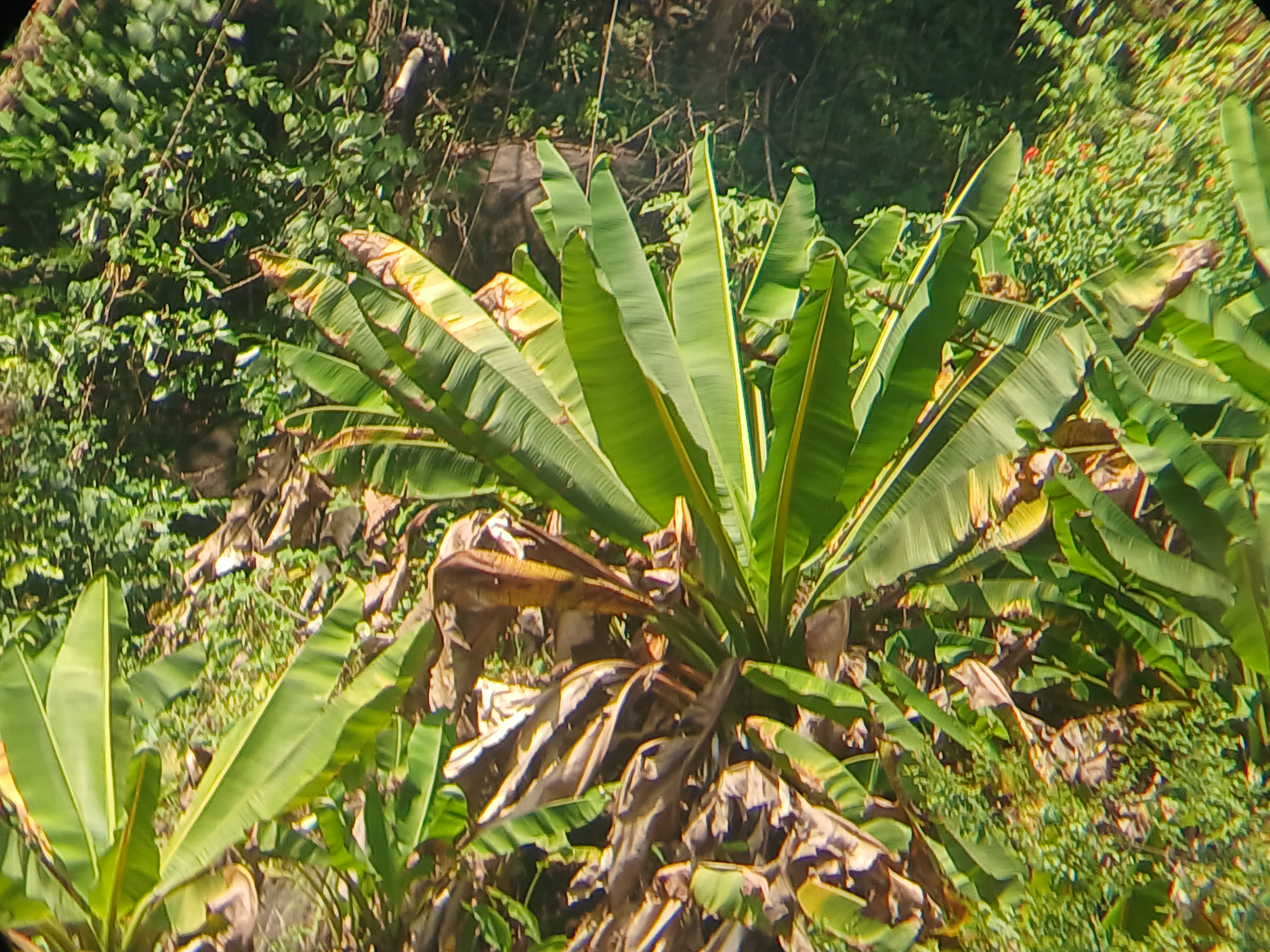

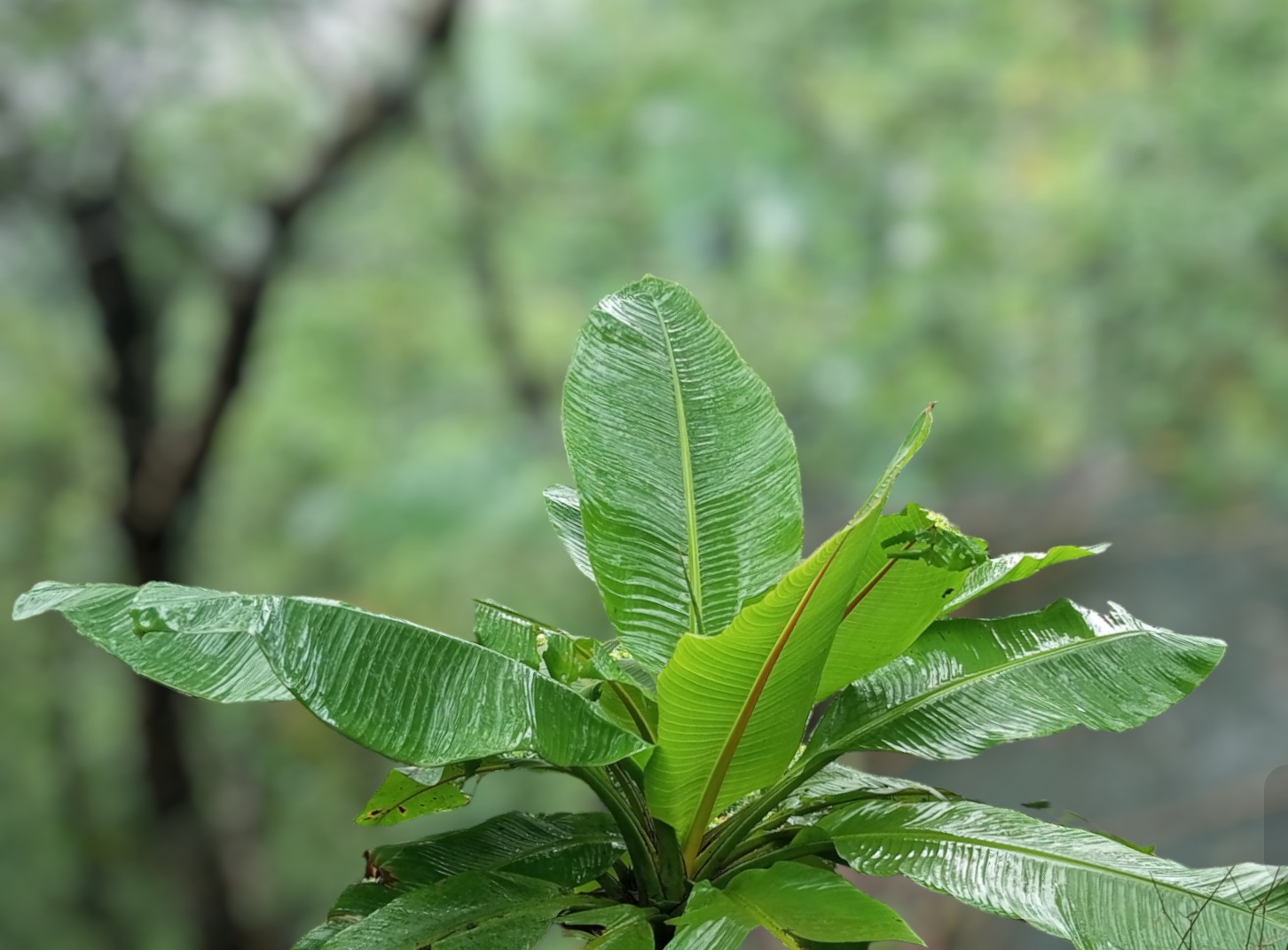

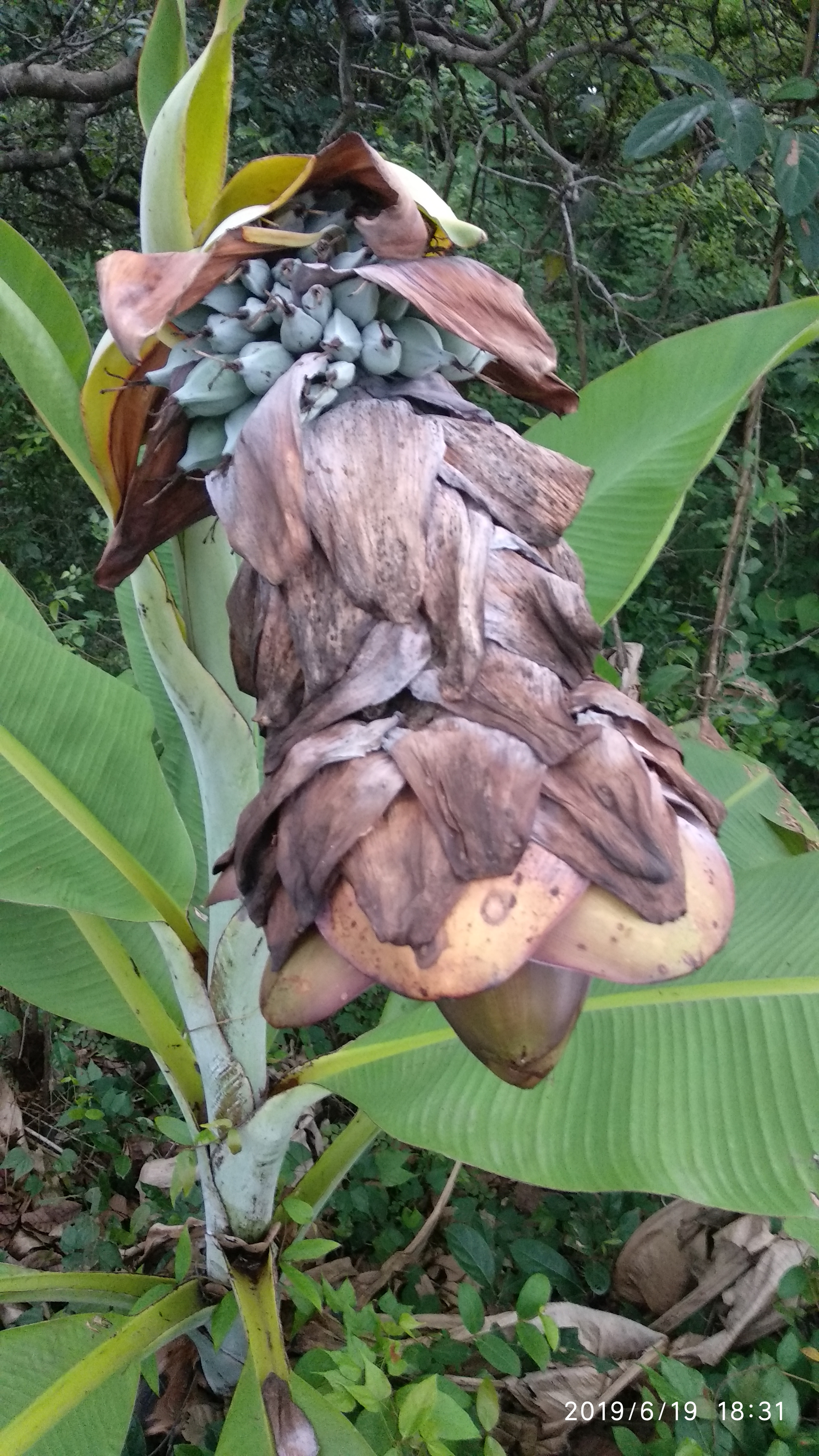

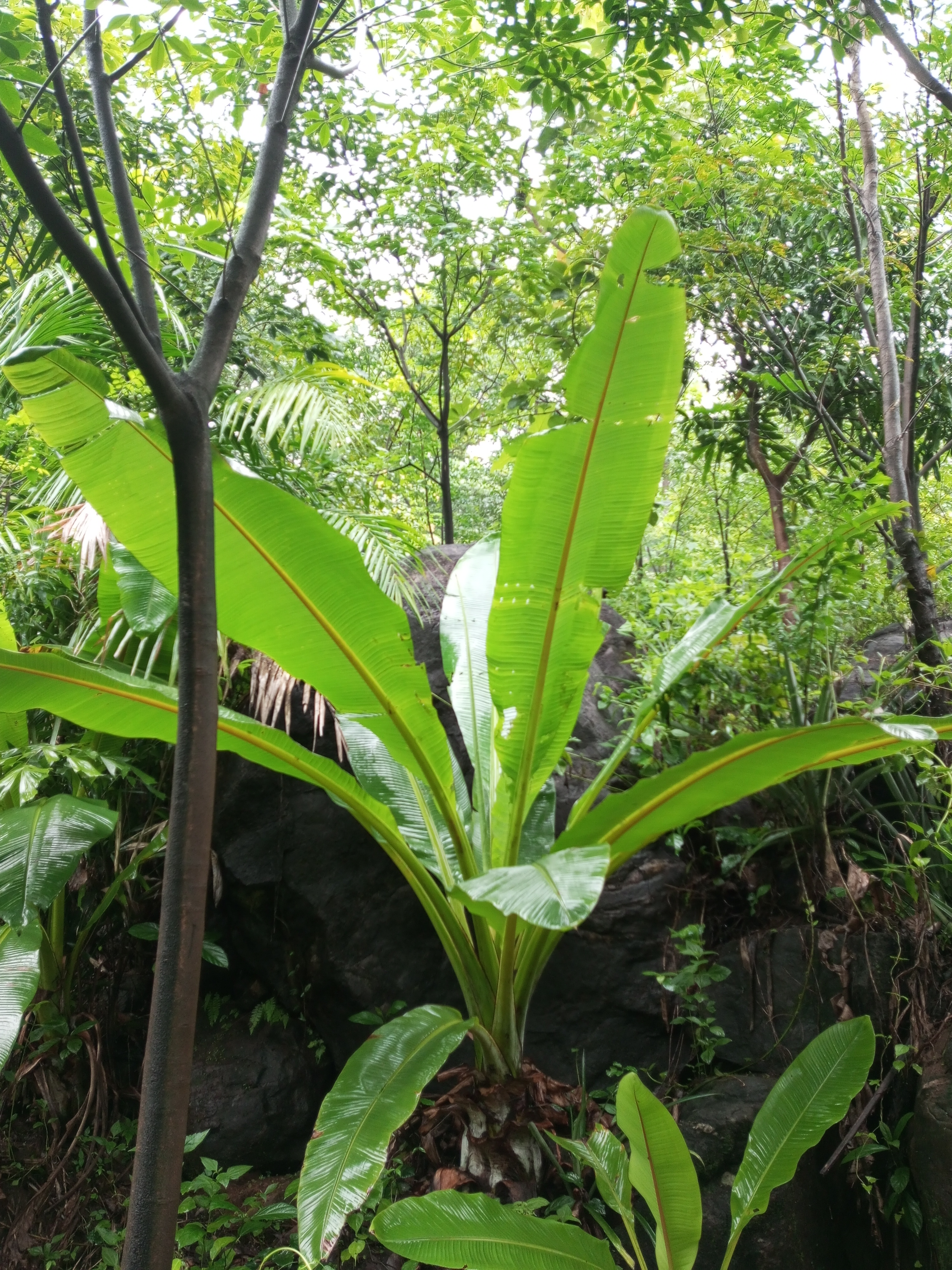
