= Red banana =

Variety of banana

Musa acuminata 'Red Dacca'
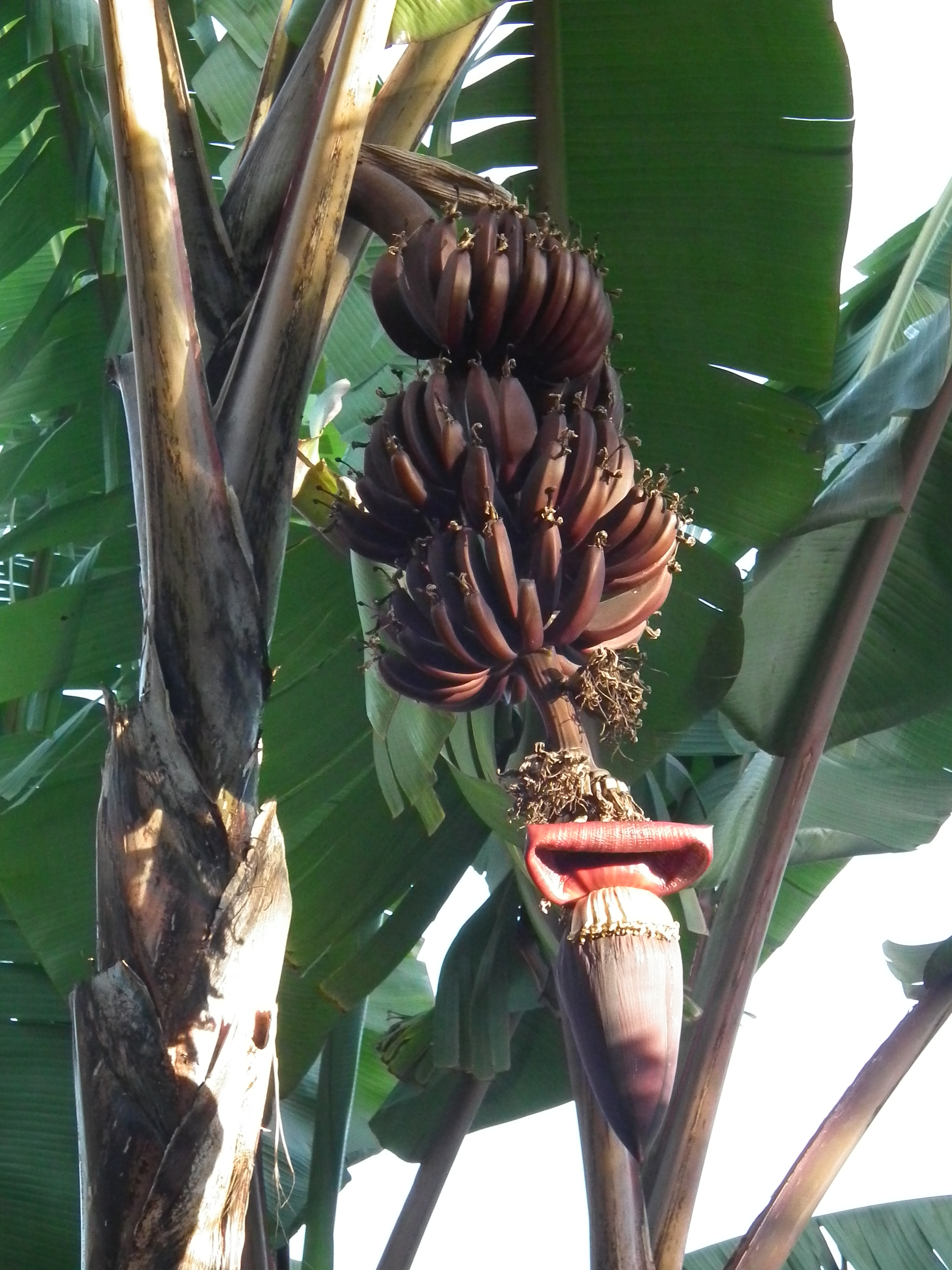
- Red banana plant from Tanzania showing fruits and inflorescence
- Species: Musa acuminata
- Cultivar group: AAA Group
- Cultivar: 'Red Dacca'
- Origin: South Asia, South East Asia

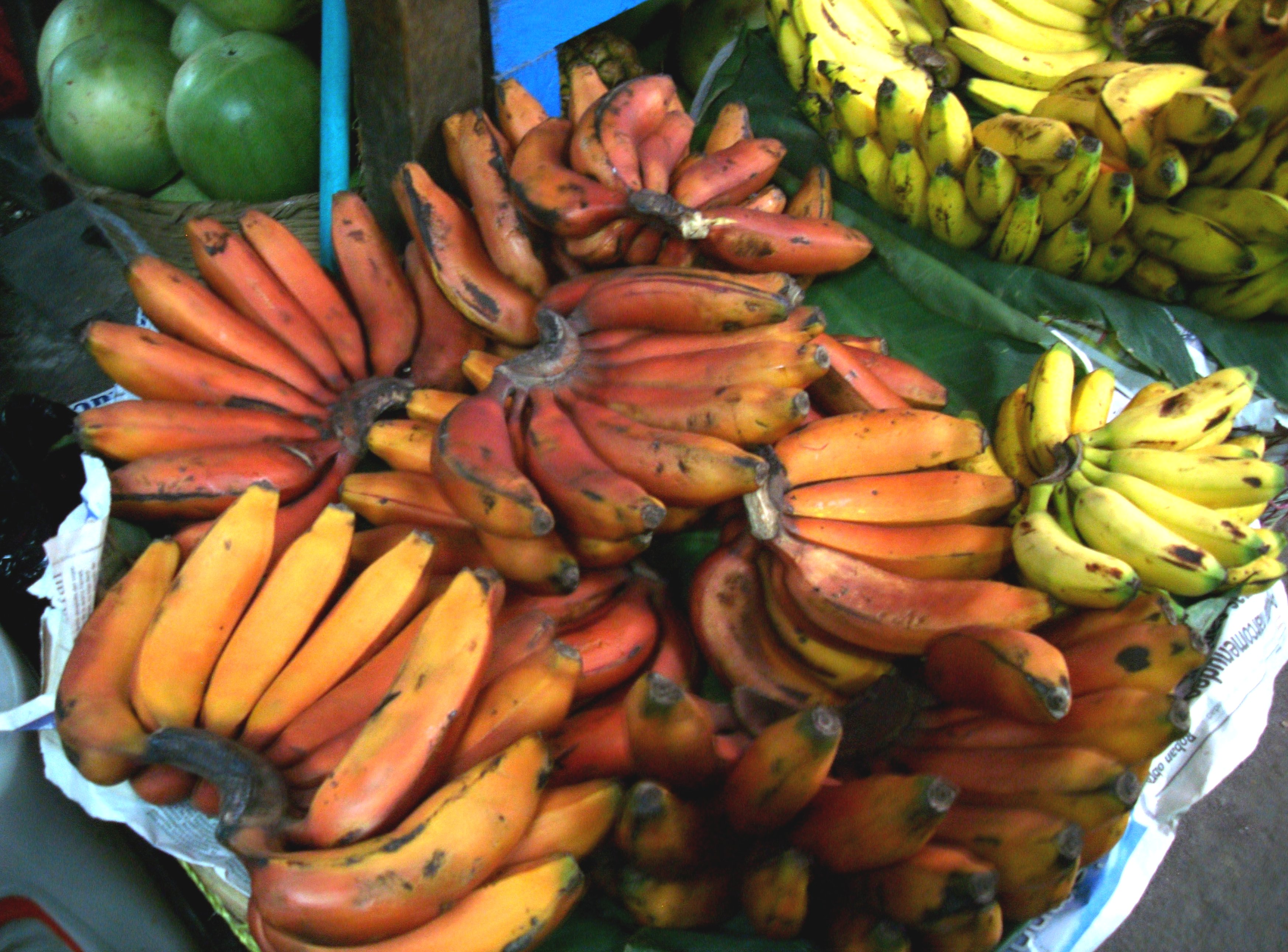
Red bananas at the market in Guatemala

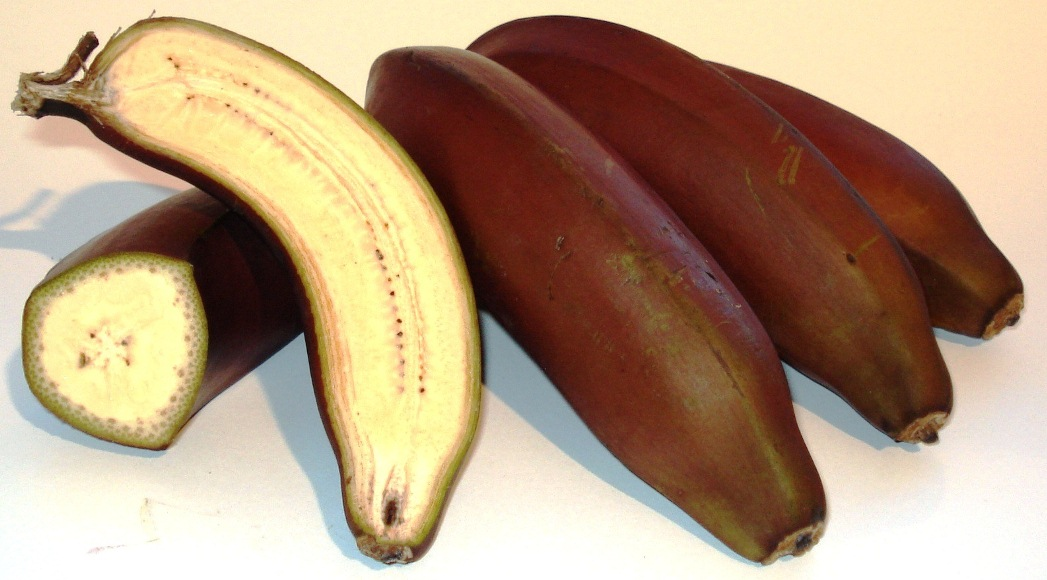
Red banana longitudinal and cross sections

Red bananas are a group of varieties of bananas with reddish-purple skin. Some are smaller and plumper than the common Cavendish banana, others much larger. Ripe, raw red bananas have a flesh that is creamy to light pink. They are also softer and sweeter than the yellow Cavendish varieties, some with a slight tangy raspberry flavor and others with an earthy one. Many red bananas are exported by producers in East Africa, Asia, South America, and the United Arab Emirates. They are a favorite in Central America, but are sold throughout the world.

== Description ==
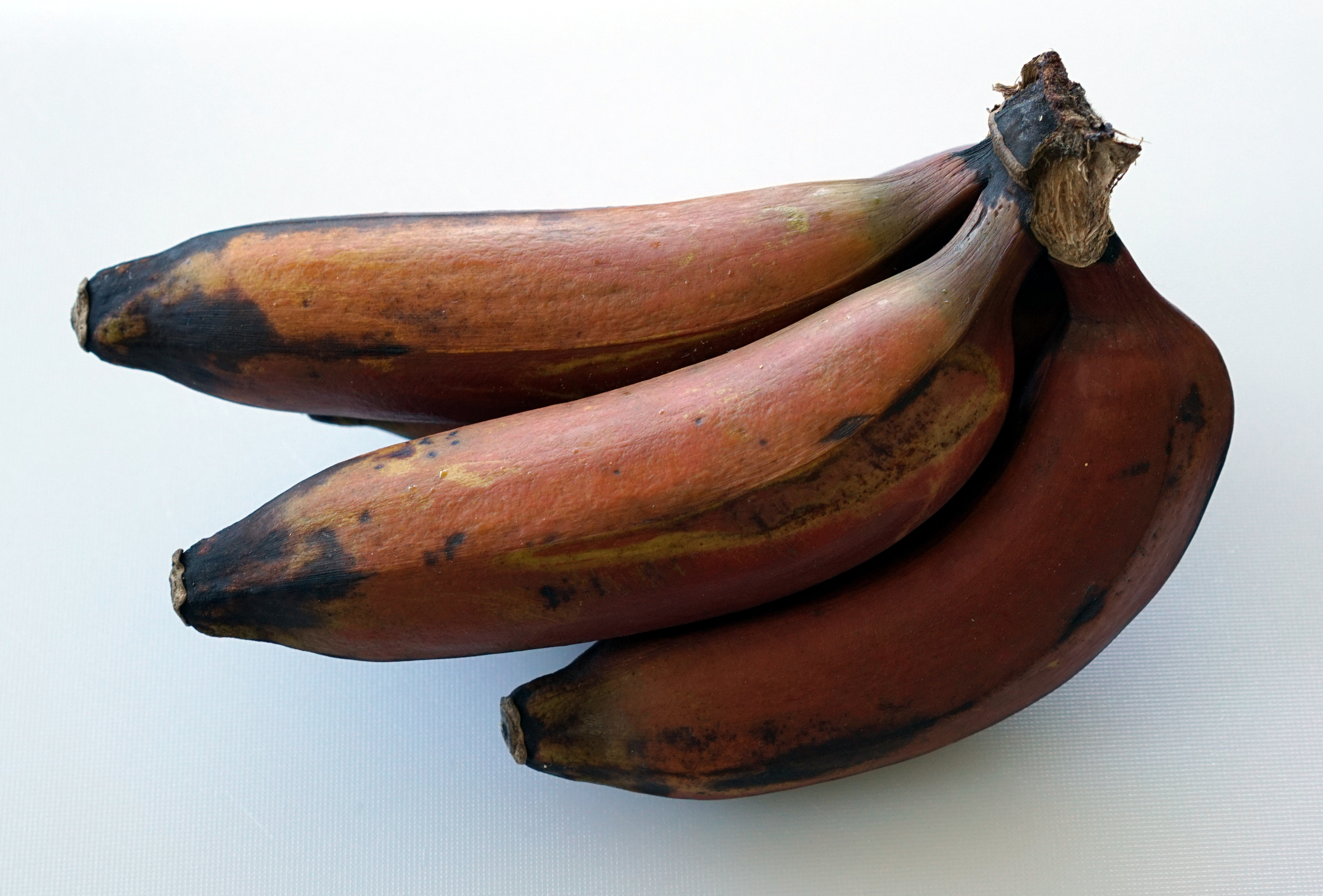
A bunch of ripe red bananas

Red bananas should have a deep red or maroon rind when ripe and are best eaten when unbruised and slightly soft. This variety contains more beta-carotene and vitamin C than yellow bananas. It also contains potassium and iron. The redder the fruit, the more carotene and the higher the vitamin C level. As with yellow bananas, red bananas will ripen in a few days at room temperature and are best stored outside from refrigeration.

Compared with the most common banana, the Cavendish banana, they tend to be smaller, have a slightly thicker skin with a sweeter taste, but do have a longer shelf life than yellow bananas.

=== Nomenclature ===
It is known in English as Red dacca (Australia), Red banana, 'Red' banana (US), Claret banana, Cavendish banana "Cuban Red", Jamaican red banana, and Red Cavendish banana.

== Taxonomy ==
The red banana is a triploid cultivar of the wild banana Musa acuminata, belonging to the AAA group.

Its official designation is Musa acuminata (AAA Group) 'Red Dacca'.

Synonyms include:

- Musa acuminata Colla (AAA Group) cv. 'Red'
- Musa sapientum L. f. rubra Bail.
- Musa sapientum L. var. rubra (Firm.) Baker
- Musa rubra Wall. ex Kurz.
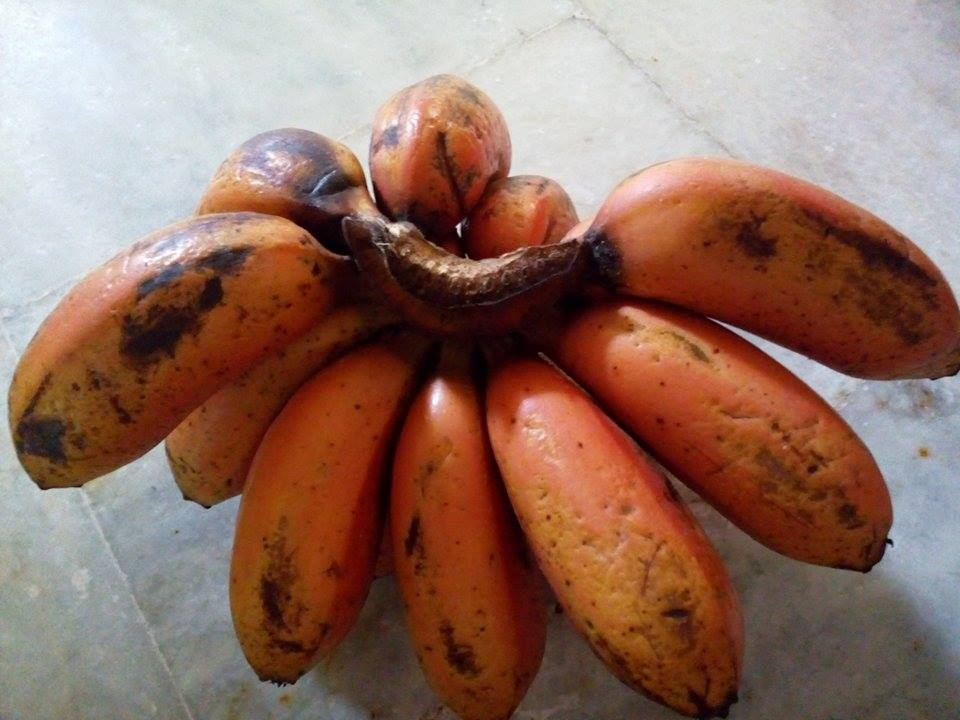
- Red banana from Tamil Nadu
  Musa × paradisiaca L. ssp. sapientum (L.) Kuntze var. rubra
- Musa acuminata Colla (AAA Group) cv. 'Cuban Red'
- Musa acuminata Colla (Cavendish Group) cv. 'Cuban Red'
- Musa acuminata Colla (AAA Group) cv. 'Red Jamaican'
- Musa acuminata Colla (AAA Group) cv. 'Jamaican Red'
- Musa acuminata Colla (AAA Group) cv. 'Spanish Red'.

== History ==
The first bananas to appear on the market in Toronto (in the 1870s and 1880s) were red bananas. Red bananas are available year-round at specialty markets and larger supermarkets in the United States.

== Uses ==
=== Culinary ===
Red bananas are eaten in the same way as yellow bananas, by peeling the fruit before eating. They are frequently eaten raw, whole, or chopped, and added to desserts and fruit salads, but can also be baked, fried, and toasted. Additionally, red bananas are commonly sold dried (for example, as chips) in stores.

The red banana has more beta-carotene and vitamin C than the yellow banana varieties. However, all bananas (regardless of their variety) are sources of three sugars: sucrose, fructose, and glucose.

== Cultivation ==
=== Pests and diseases ===
- Panama disease

== See also ==
- Banana cultivar groups
- Musa acuminata
- Blue java banana
- Madagascar banana
