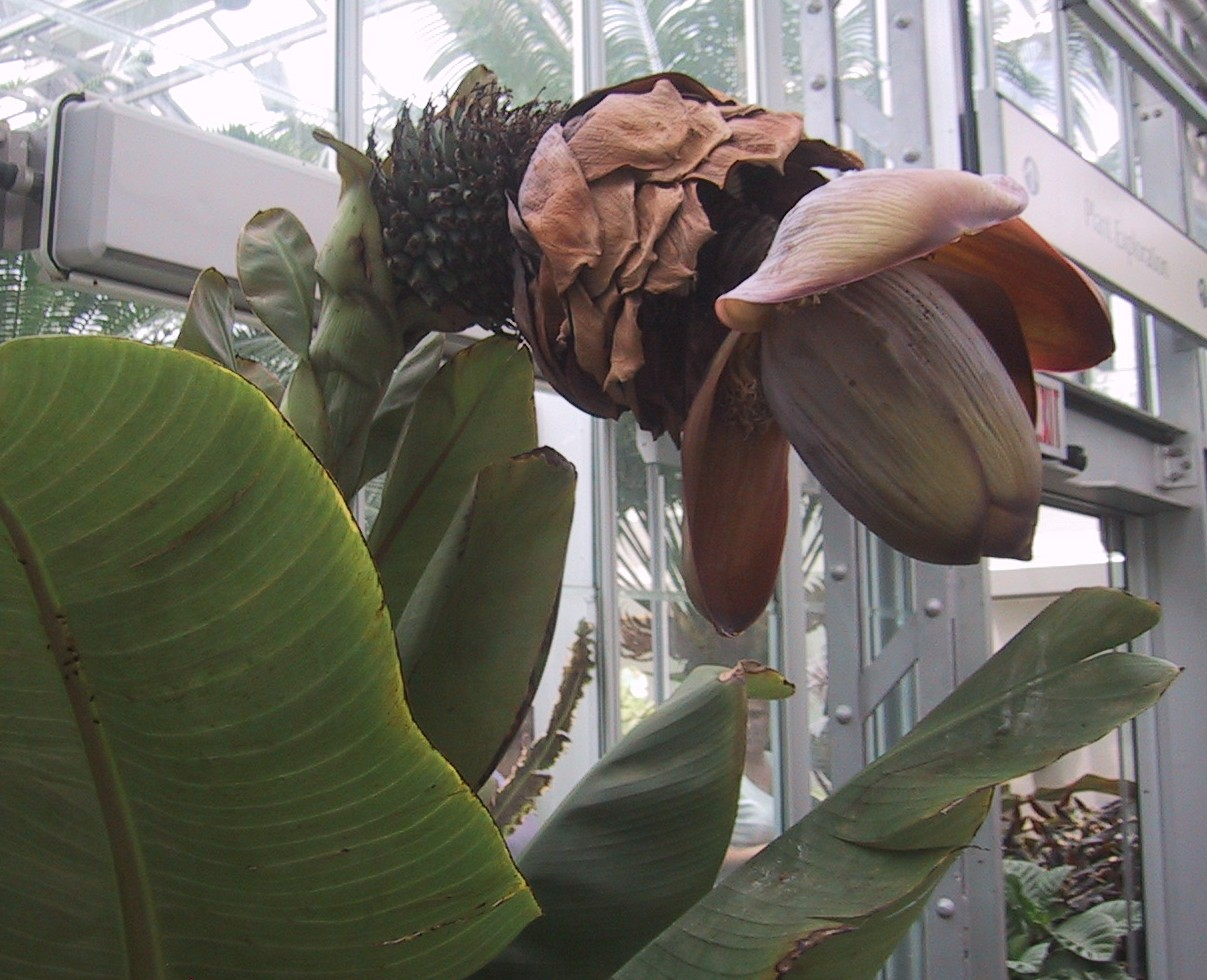
- Ensete superbum at the United States Botanic Garden

Scientific classification
- Kingdom: Plantae
- Clade: Tracheophytes
- Clade: Angiosperms
- Clade: Monocots
- Clade: Commelinids
- Order: Zingiberales
- Family: Musaceae
- Genus: Ensete; Bruce

Species
- See text

= Ensete =

Ensete Temporal range: Eocene–Recent

Genus of plants

Ensete is a genus of monocarpic flowering plants native to tropical regions of Africa and Asia. It is one of the three genera in the banana family, Musaceae, and includes the false banana or enset (E. ventricosum), an economically important food crop in Ethiopia.

== Taxonomy ==
The genus Ensete was first described by Paul Fedorowitsch Horaninow (or Horaninov, 1796–1865) in his Prodromus Monographiae Scitaminarum of 1862 in which he created a single species, Ensete edule. However, the genus did not receive general recognition until 1947 when it was revived by E. E. Cheesman in the first of a series of papers in the Kew Bulletin on the classification of the bananas, with a total of 25 species.

Taxonomically, the genus Ensete has shrunk since Cheesman revived the taxon. Cheesman acknowledged that field study might reveal synonymy and the most recent review of the genus by Simmonds (1960) listed just six. Recently the number has increased to seven as the Flora of China has, not entirely convincingly, reinstated Ensete wilsonii. There is one species in Thailand, somewhat resembling E. superbum, that has not been formally described, and possibly other Asian species.

It is possible to separate Ensete into its African and Asian species.

Africa
Ensete gilletii synonym Ensete livingstonianum - native range W. Tropical Africa to Malawi

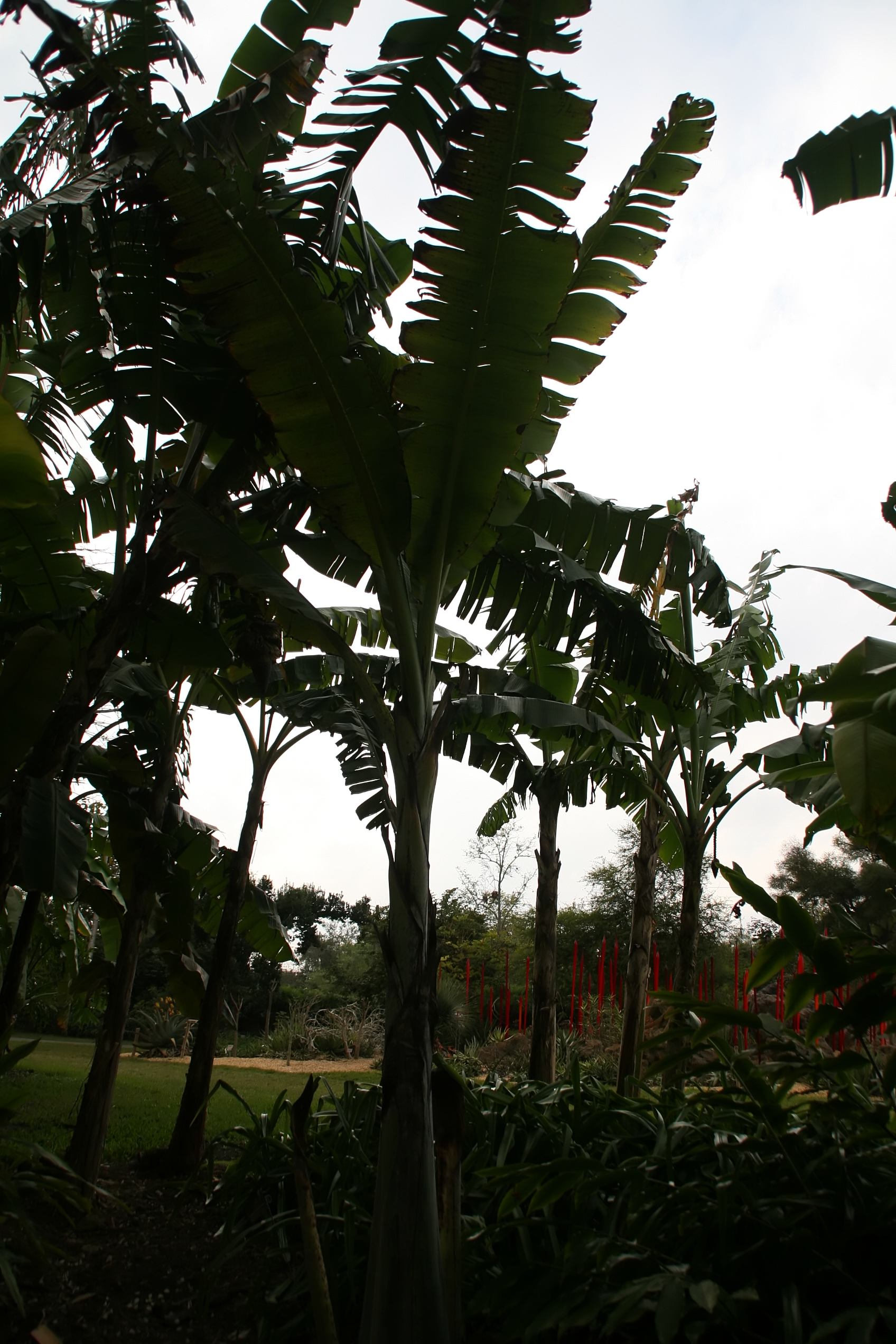
Ensete glaucum (Snow banana)

Ensete homblei - native range is SE. DR Congo to N. Zambia
Ensete perrieri – endemic to Madagascar but intriguingly like the Asian E. glaucum
Ensete ventricosum – enset or false banana, widely cultivated as a food plant in Ethiopia

Asia

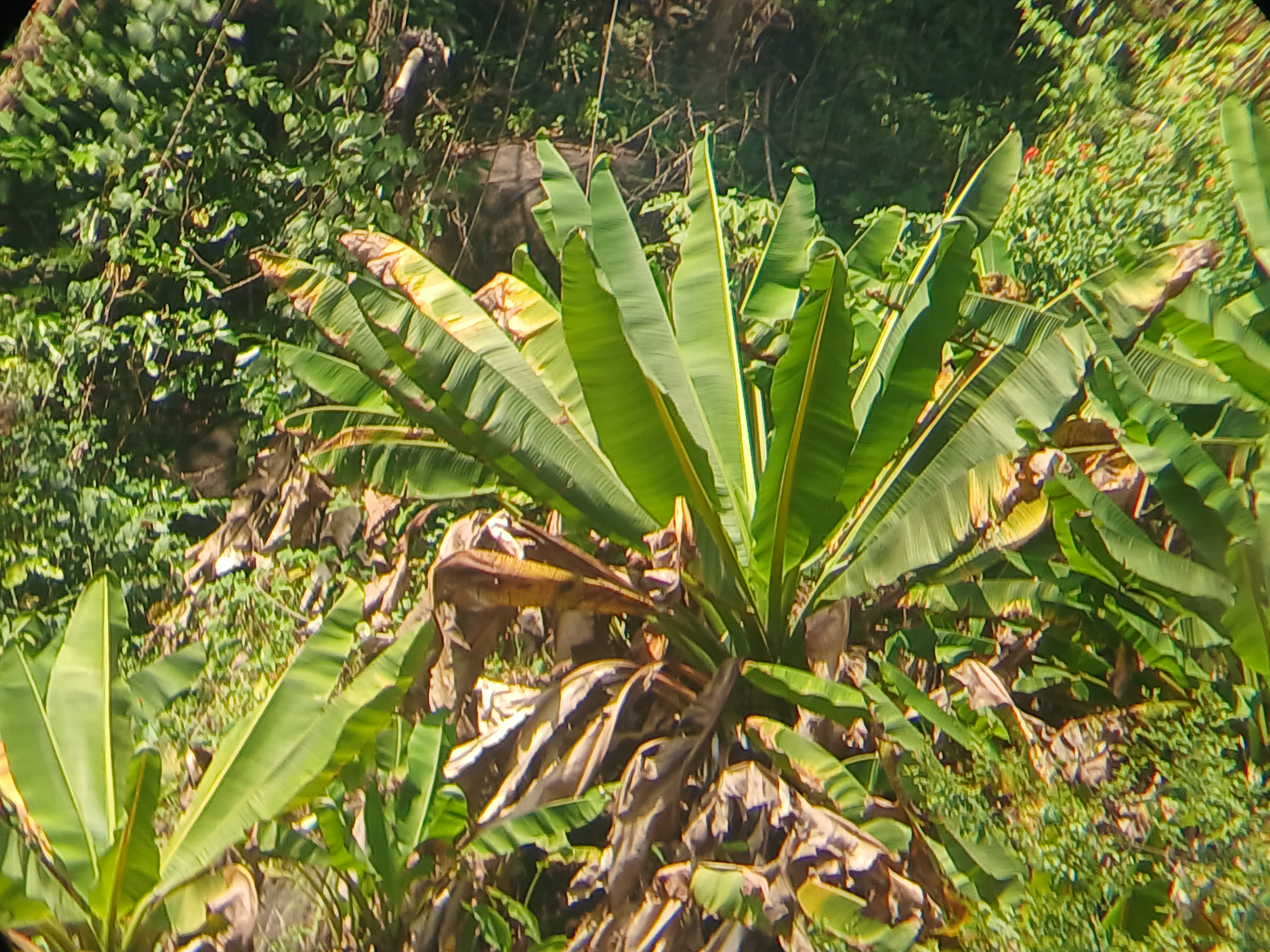
Ensete superbum (Ghat banana)

Ensete glaucum – widespread in Asia from India to Papua New Guinea
Ensete superbum – Western Ghats of India
Ensete wilsonii – Yunnan, China, but doubtfully distinct from E. glaucum
Ensete sp. "Thailand" – possibly a new species or a disjunct population of E. superbum

=== Extinct species ===
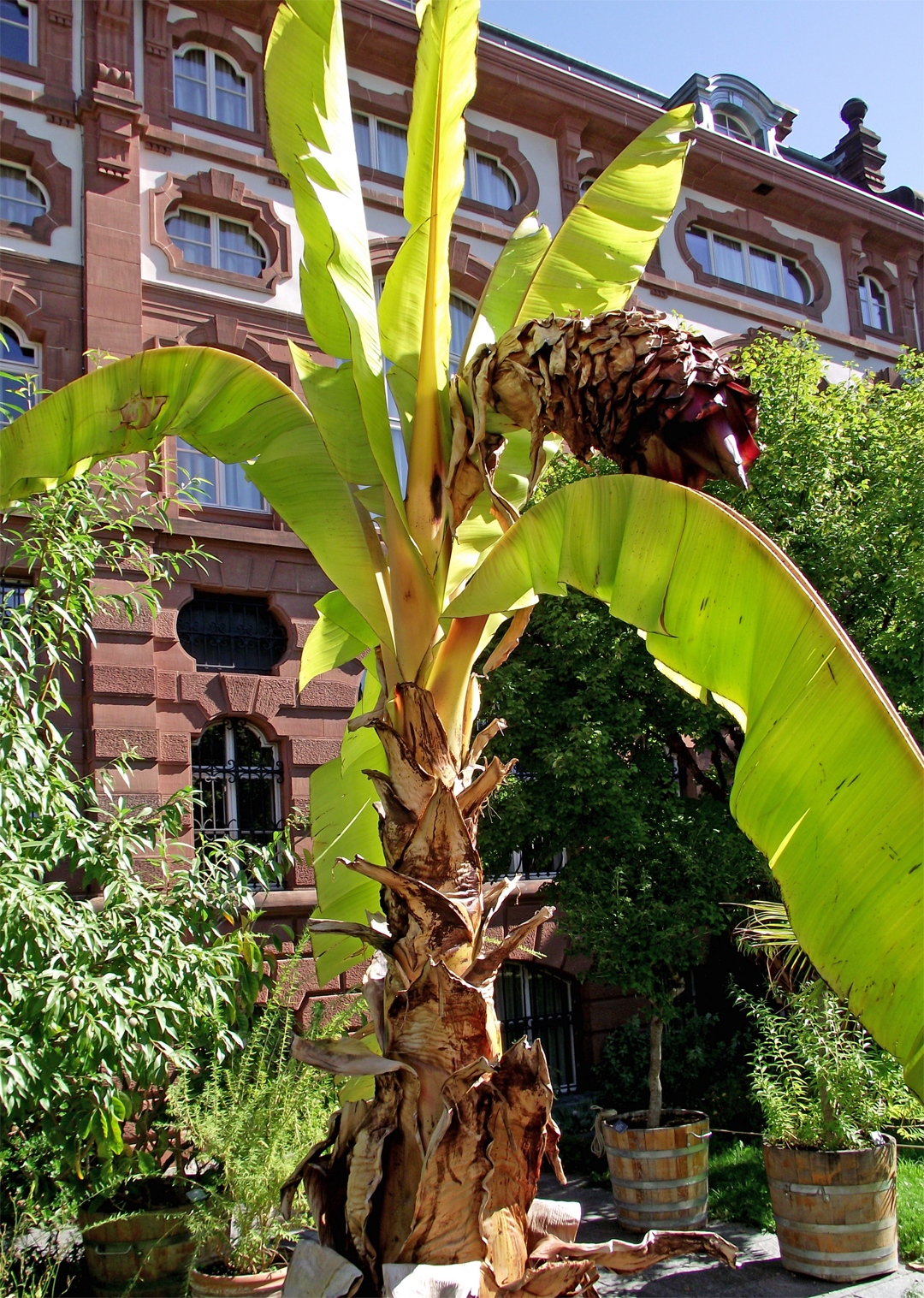
Ensete ventricosum (Abyssinian banana)

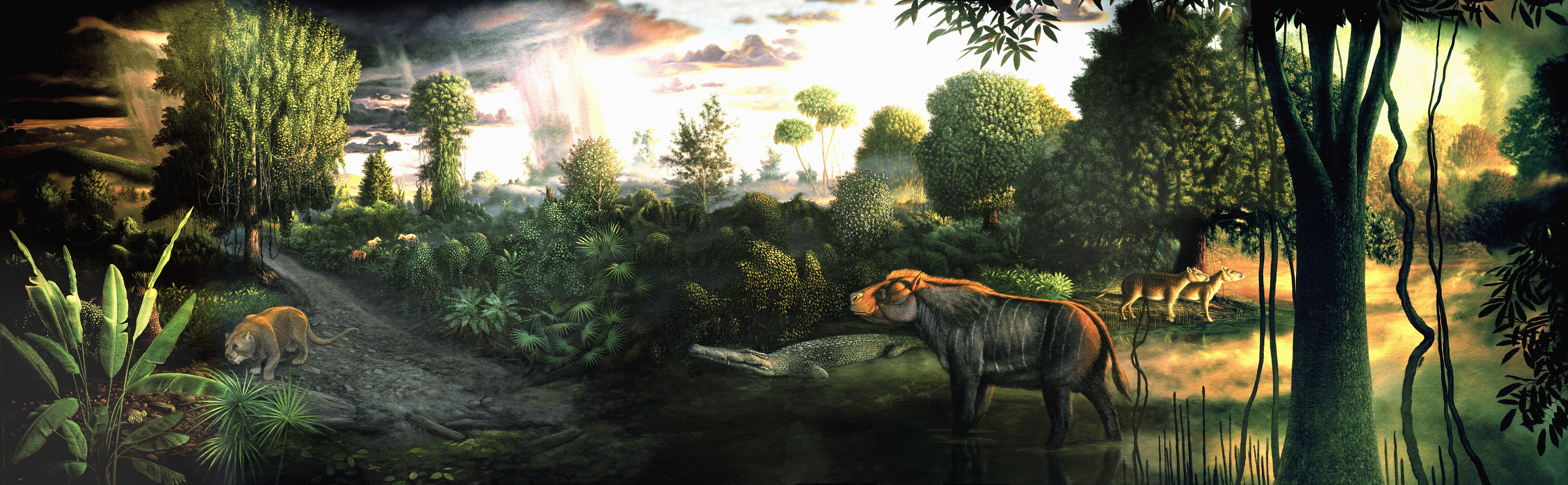
Ensete oregonense (bottom, left)

Ensete oregonense Clarno Formation, Oregon, United States, Eocene

== See also ==
- List of Ethiopian dishes and foods
- List of Southern African indigenous trees
- Musa (genus)
- Musella lasiocarpa
- True plantains

== Relevant literature ==
- Borrell, James S., Mark Goodwin, Guy Blomme, Kim Jacobsen, Abebe M. Wendawek, Dawd Gashu, Ermias Lulekal, Zemede Asfaw, Sebsebe Demissew, and Paul Wilkin. "Enset‐based agricultural systems in Ethiopia: A systematic review of production trends, agronomy, processing and the wider food security applications of a neglected banana relative." Plants, People, Planet 2, no. 3 (2020): 212-228.
