= Blue Java banana =

Banana cultivar

Musa 'Blue Java'
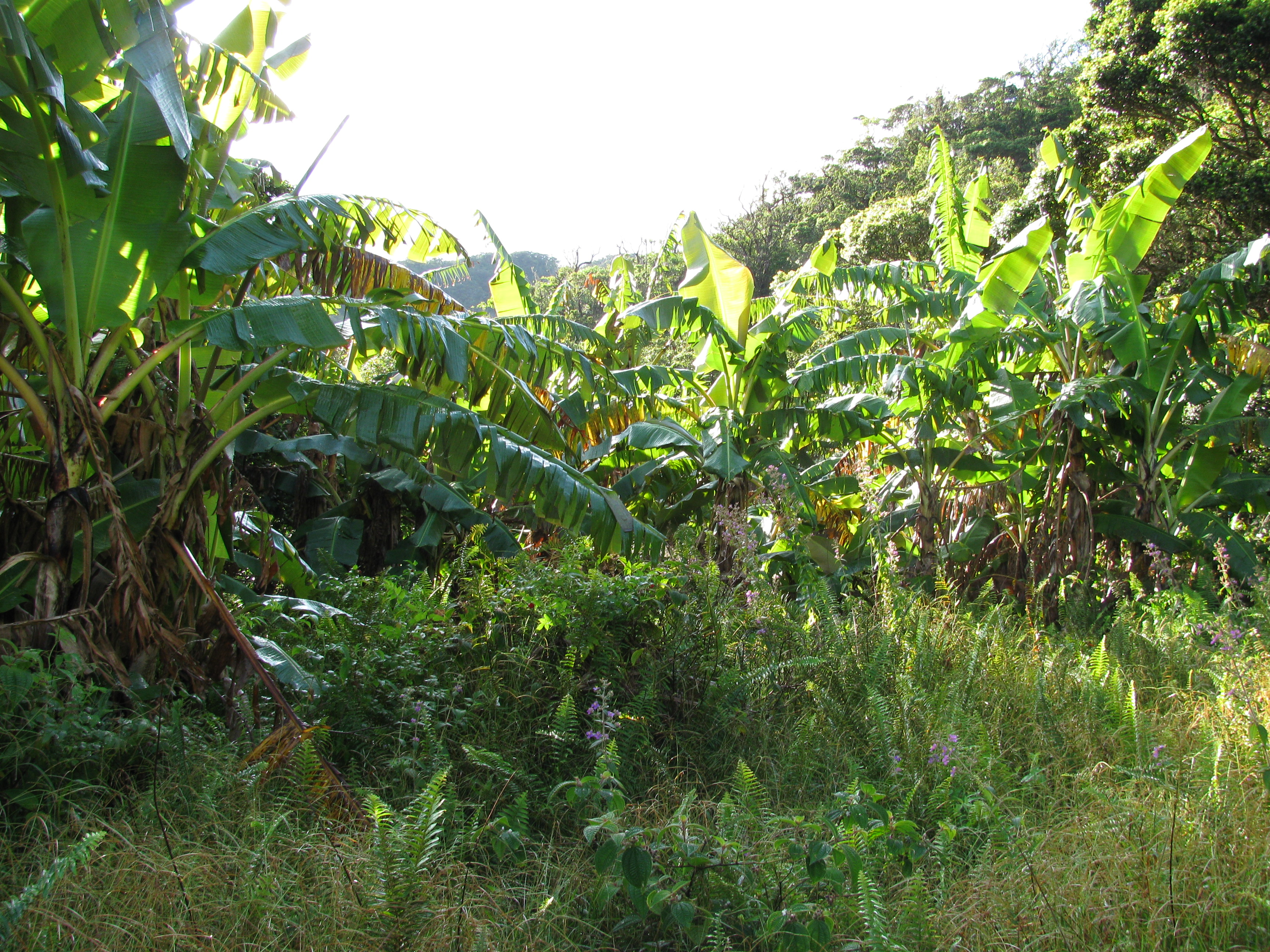
- Stands in Maui, Hawaii
- Hybrid parentage: Musa acuminata × balbisiana
- Cultivar group: ABB Group
- Cultivar: 'Blue Java'
- Origin: Southeast Asia down to Northern Australia

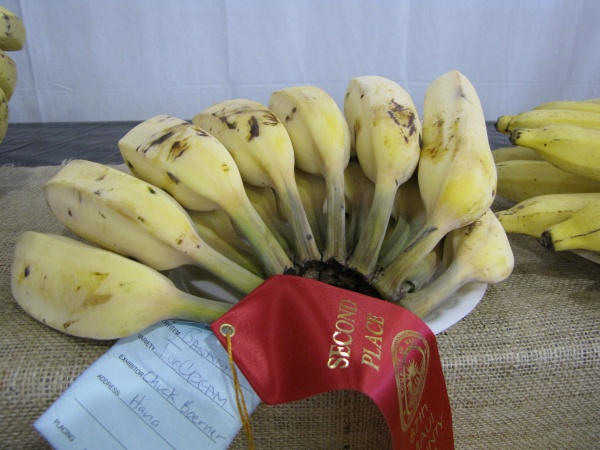
Bunch of Blue Java bananas

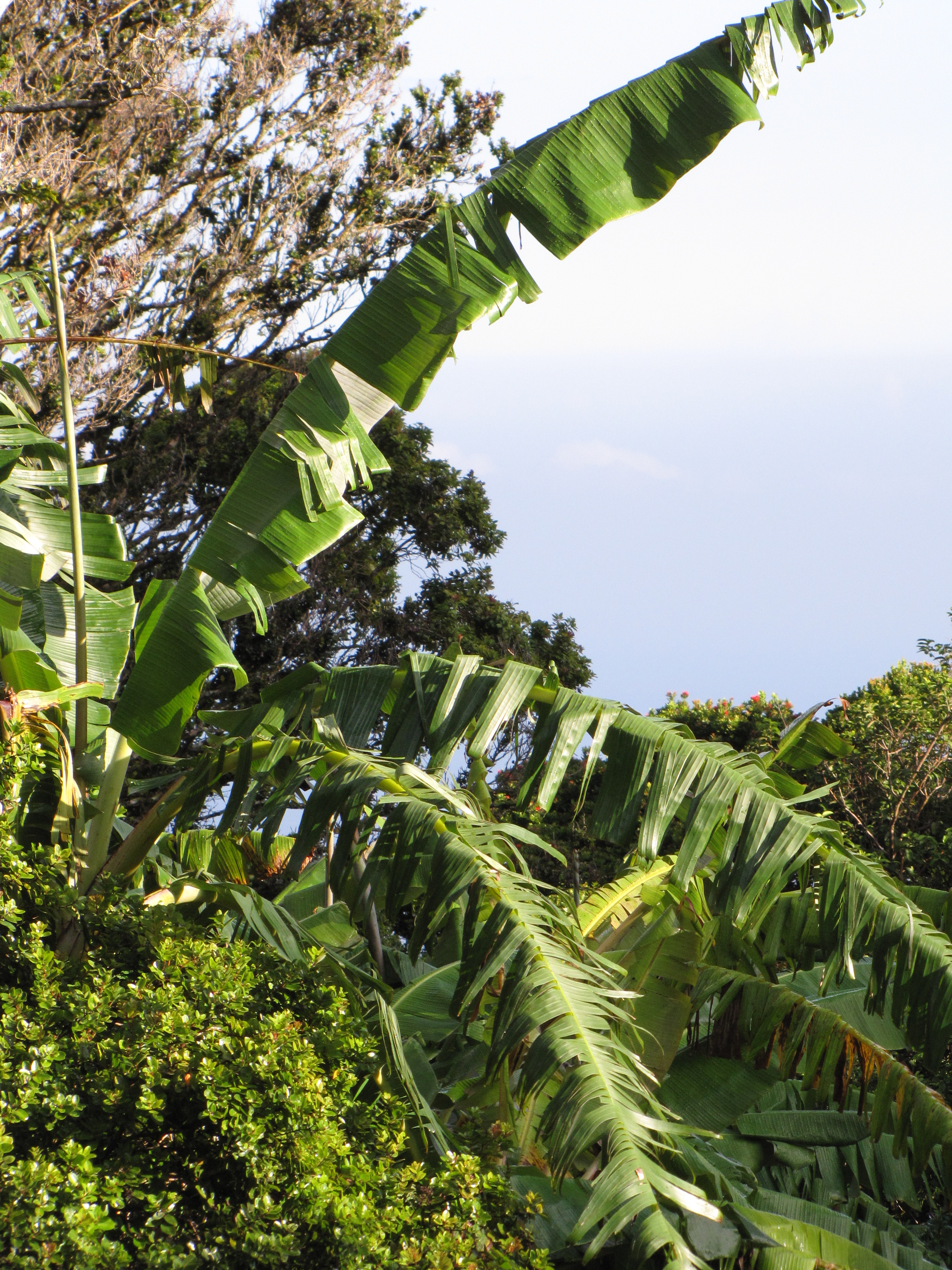
Blue Java tree in Maui, Hawaii

The Blue Java (also known as the blue banana, Ice Cream banana, Vanilla Banana, Hawaiian banana, Ney Mannan, Krie, or Cenizo) is a hardy, cold-tolerant banana cultivar known for its sweet aromatic fruit, which is said to have an ice cream-like consistency and flavor reminiscent of vanilla. It is native to Southeast Asia and is a hybrid of two species of banana native to Southeast Asia—Musa balbisiana and Musa acuminata.

== Taxonomy and nomenclature ==
The Blue Java banana is a triploid (ABB) hybrid of the seeded banana Musa balbisiana and Musa acuminata.

Its accepted name is Musa acuminata × balbisiana (ABB Group) 'Blue Java'.

Synonyms include:

- Musa acuminata × balbisiana (ABB Group) 'Ice Cream'

In Hawaii it is known as the 'Ice Cream banana' and in Fiji as the 'Hawaiian banana'. It is also called 'Krie' in the Philippines, 'Kepok Awu' in Indonesia and 'Cenizo' in Central America.

== Description ==
Blue Java banana trees can grow to a height of 4.5 to 6 metres (15 to 20 ft). They are cold-tolerant and wind-resistant because of their strong pseudostems and root systems. The leaves are silvery green in color.

The fruit bunches are small, bearing seven to nine hands. The fruit are 18 to 23 centimetres (7 to 9 in) in length and exhibit a characteristic silvery green color when unripe where the silveriness is caused by heavy coat of wax. The fruit turn a pale yellow when ripe, with white creamy flesh. They bloom around 15 to 24 months after planting and can be harvested after 115 to 150 days. The bananas have bumps called "knuckles" due to their passing resemblance to human knuckles.

== Uses ==
Blue Java bananas are popular bananas that can be eaten fresh or cooked. They are known for their fragrant flavor which has a vanilla-like custard taste.

They are also popular as ornamentals and shade plants for their unusual blue coloration, large size, and tolerance to temperate climates.

== Pests and diseases ==
=== Common pests ===
- Borers
- Grasshoppers
- Root-knot nematode

=== Common diseases ===
- Panama disease
- Black sigatoka

== See also ==
- List of banana cultivars
- Madagascar banana
- Plantain (disambiguation)
- Red banana
- Saba banana
