= Ernest Entwistle Cheesman =

English botanist (1898–1983)

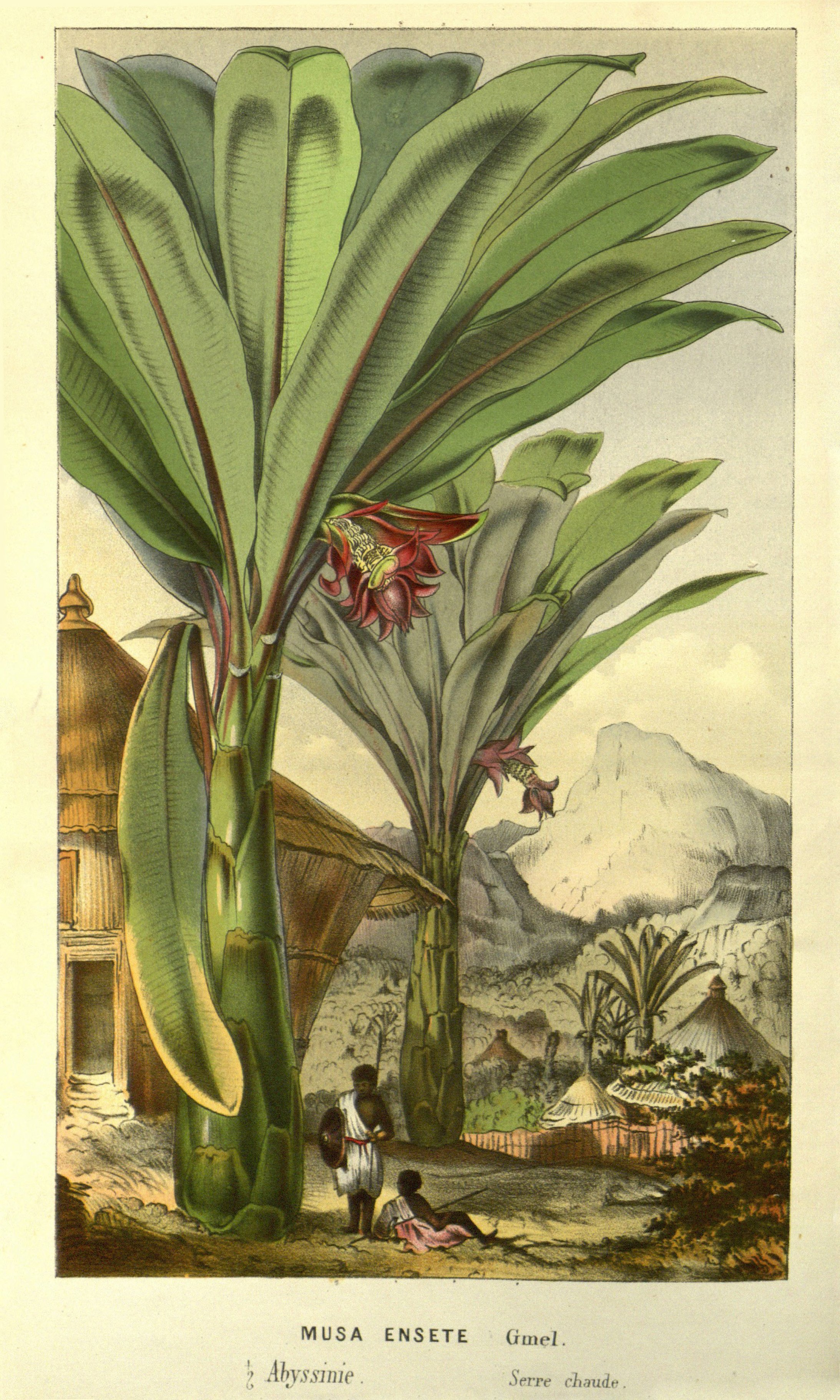
Ensete ventricosum

Ernest Entwistle Cheesman (21 September 1898 Wood Green - 9 January 1983 Weybridge), was an English botanist noted in particular for his work on the banana family Musaceae.

== Career ==
Cheesman worked in Trinidad and Tobago in 1925-1937 as professor of botany at the Trinidad Imperial College of Tropical Agriculture. There, he published Flora of Trinidad and Tobago with R. O. Williams in 1929.

Cheesman also became interested in the cultivation of cocoa while in Trinidad and wrote a number of papers on the subject.

Returning to England, he worked on the taxonomy of Musaceae at the Royal Botanic Gardens, Kew during the 1940s.

As a result of his studies, he revived the genus Ensete in 1947 (Kew Bull. 1947, 97), which had first been published in 1862 by Paul Fedorowitsch Horaninow (1796-1865), but rejected. Cheesman made it clear that there are no wild Musa native to Africa, only Ensete, and that Ensete is monocarpic, has large seeds and 9 haploid chromosomes.

About bananas, Cheesman noted in 1948:

"Some botanists have regarded the seedless forms as ranking with the fertile species and have bestowed Latin binomials upon them. Others have preferred to regard them as varieties of one mythical "species" (usually called "Musa sapientum") which is supposed to exist somewhere in the wild and fertile condition … Such mistakes... are not peculiar to the genus "Musa", but they are unusually conspicuous in this group". Giving a seed-bearing wild species the status of subspecies to a seedless cultivar is a good example of the stultifying effect formal nomenclature has had on crop taxonomy.

N.W.Simmonds named the plant species Musa cheesmanii in tribute to Cheesman's work on the Musaceae. Simmonds was a 1950s research worker on Musaceae at the Imperial College of Tropical Agriculture in Trinidad. Cheesman had worked at the college in the late 1920s and 1930s.

== Personal life ==
Cheesman was the son of Charles Cheesman and Grace Lizzie Davies. About August 1936, he married Ellen Elizabeth B. Weston (1892-1966).

== Some Publications ==
- Cheesman, E. E., and R. O. Williams. 1928. Flora of Trinidad and Tobago. Port-of-Spain, Trinidad. Government Printing Office.
- Cheesman, E.E. 1931 Banana breeding at the Imperial College of Tropical Agriculture - A progress report. H.M. Stationery Office in London .
- Cheesman, E.E. 1932 Genetic and cytological studies of Musa. I. Certain hybrids of the Gros Michel banana Journal of Genetics 26: 291-312
- Cheesman E.E. 1935. The vegetative propagation of cocoa. Tropical Agriculture 12(9): 240-246.
- Cheesman E.E. 1936. The vegetative propagation of cocoa. VII.- Root systems of cuttings. Page 7, plates 3 & 4 in Fifth Annual Report on Cocoa Research 1935, Trinidad.
- Cheesman E.E. 1941. General notes on field experiments CRB1 to CRB6. Pages 4–11 in Tenth Annual Report on Cocoa Research 1940. Trinidad.
- Cheesman, E.E. 1947 Classification of the bananas. II. The genus Musa L. Kew Bulletin 2: 106-117
- Cheesman, E.E. 1948a Classification of the bananas. III. Critical notes on species a. Musa balbisiana Colla. Kew Bulletin 3: 11-17
- Cheesman, E.E. 1948b Classification of the bananas. III. Critical notes on species b. Musa acuminata Colla. Kew Bulletin 3: 17-28
