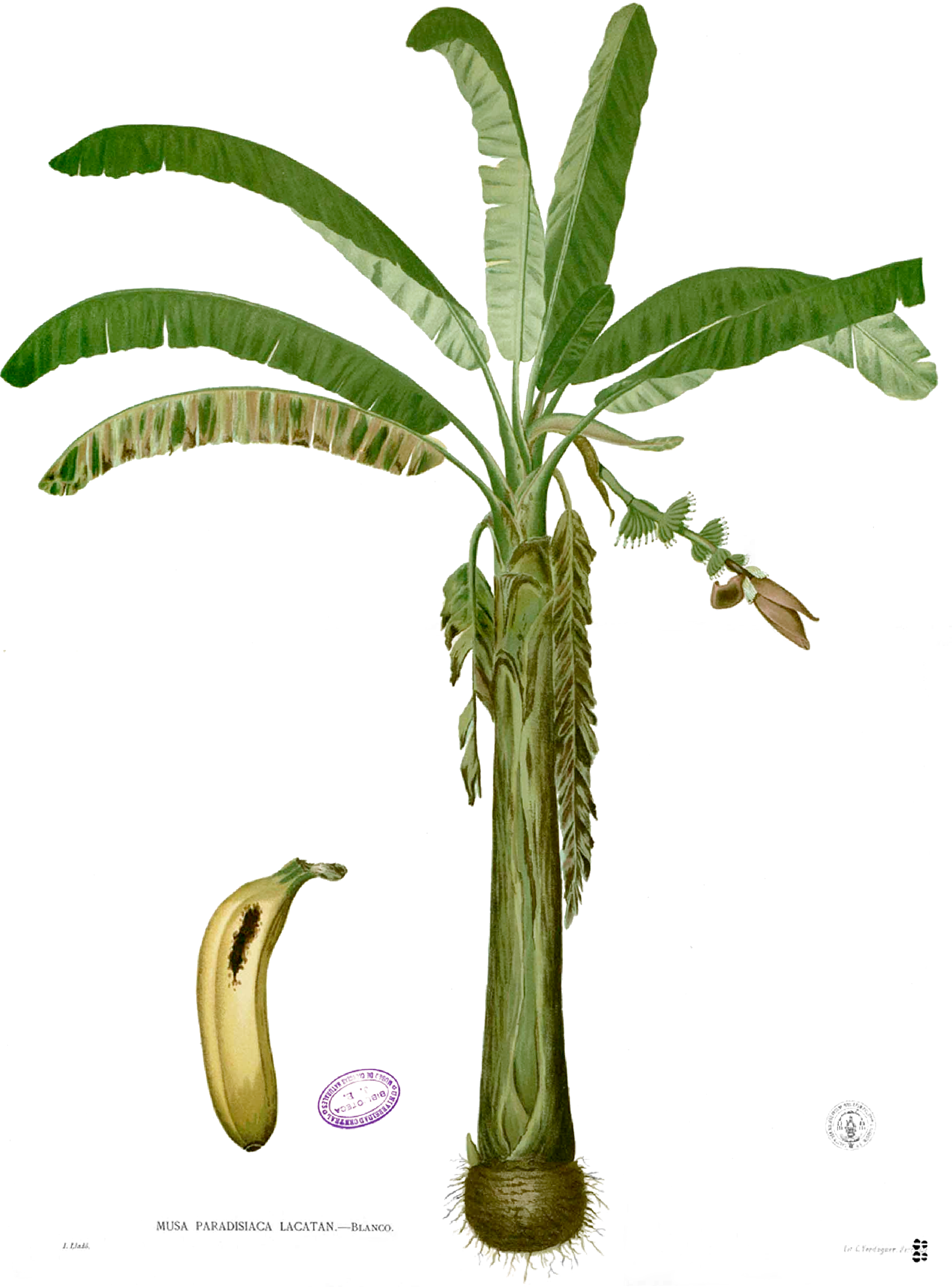
- Musa × paradisiaca

Scientific classification
- Kingdom: Plantae
- Clade: Tracheophytes
- Clade: Angiosperms
- Clade: Monocots
- Clade: Commelinids
- Order: Zingiberales
- Family: Musaceae; Juss.

Type genus
- Musa L.

Genera
- Ensete; Musa; Musella (also treated within Ensete)
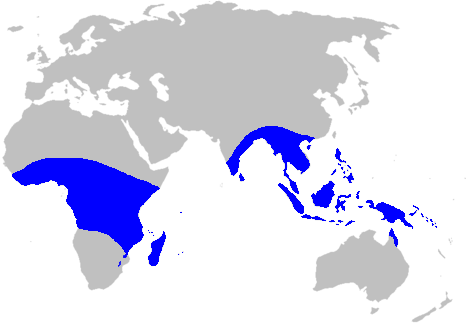
- Musaceae distribution

= Musaceae =

Musaceae Temporal range: Santonian - recent

Family of flowering plants

Musaceae is a family of flowering plants composed of three genera with about 91 known species, placed in the order Zingiberales. The family is native to the tropics of Africa and Asia. The plants have a large herbaceous growth habit with leaves with overlapping basal sheaths that form a pseudostem making some members appear to be woody trees. In most treatments, the family has three genera, Musa, Musella and Ensete. Cultivated bananas are commercially important members of the family, and many others are grown as ornamental plants.

== Taxonomy ==
The family has been practically universally recognized by taxonomists, although with differing circumscriptions. Older circumscriptions of the family commonly included the genera now included in Heliconiaceae and Strelitziaceae.

The APG III system, of 2009 (unchanged from the APG system, 1998), assigns Musaceae to the order Zingiberales in the clade commelinids in the monocots.

The oldest fossil evidence of the family is thought to possibly be the Late Cretaceous palynotaxon Spirematospermum chandlerae from North Carolina, unlike most other Spirematospermum species which are thought to represent members of Zingiberaceae. In contrast, "Musa" cardiosperma from the Maastrichtian Intertrappean Beds of India, formerly considered the earliest record of the genus Musa, is now thought to be a member of the Zingiberaceae and has been reclassified into the extinct genus Momordiocarpon. The oldest unequivocal fossil of the family is Ensete oregonense from the Eocene Clarno Formation of Oregon, although its actual placement within the family is uncertain.

Cladogram: Phylogeny of Zingiberales

- Zingiberales
  - - - Zingiberineae
        - Zingiberariae
          - Zingiberaceae
          - Costaceae
        - Cannariae
          - Cannaceae
          - Marantaceae
      - - Strelitziineae
          - Lowiaceae
          - Strelitziaceae
        - Heliconiaceae
  - - Musaceae

=== Genera ===
As currently circumscribed the family includes three genera. All genera and species are native to the Old World tropics. The largest and most economically important genus in the family is Musa, famous for the banana and plantain. The genus Musa was formally established in the first edition of Linnaeus' Species Plantarum in 1753 — the publication that marks the start of the present formal botanical nomenclature. At the time he wrote Species Plantarum, Linnaeus had first hand knowledge of only one type of banana, which he personally had the opportunity of seeing growing under glass in the garden of Mr. George Clifford near Haarlem in the Netherlands.

Before 1753, the genus had already been described by the pre-Linnaean botanist Georg Eberhard Rumphius and Linnaeus himself had described the banana he had seen as Musa cliffortiana in 1736 (this might be described as a "pre-Linnaean" Linnaean name). The 1753 name Musa paradisiaca L. for plantains and Musa sapientum L. for dessert bananas are now known to refer to hybrids, rather than natural species. It is known today that most cultivated seedless bananas are hybrids or polyploids of two wild banana species - Musa acuminata and Musa balbisiana. Linnaeus' Musa sapientum is now identified to be the hybrid Latundan cultivar (M. × paradisiaca AAB Group 'Silk'), while his Musa paradisiaca are now known to be hybrids belonging generally to the AAB and ABB banana cultivar groups. Hybridization and polyploidy was the cause of much confusion in the taxonomy of the genus Musa that was not resolved until the 1940s and 1950s.

In this clearing up of the taxonomy, Ernest Entwistle Cheesman in 1947 revived the genus name Ensete which had been published in 1862, by Horaninow, but had not been accepted.

Musa section Musella Franch. was raised to the rank of genus by H.W. Li in 1978 for the Chinese species Musella lasiocarpa, which was originally described in Musa in 1889 and transferred to Ensete by Cheesman in 1948. The species combines characters like the swollen stems of Ensete with the clonal habit of Musa. Acceptance of Musella has varied; as of February 2013, the World Checklist of Selected Plant Families considers it a synonym of Ensete, other sources dispute this view.

== Bibliography ==
- Sass, C; Iles, WJ; Barrett, CF; Smith, SY; Specht, CD (21 January 2016). "Revisiting the Zingiberales: using multiplexed exon capture to resolve ancient and recent phylogenetic splits in a charismatic plant lineage". PeerJ. 4 e1584. doi:10.7717/peerj.1584. PMC 4727956. PMID 26819846.
