= Banana =

Tropical, edible, staple fruit

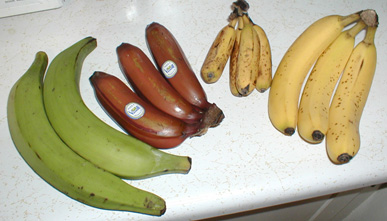
- Fruits of four different cultivars. Left to right: plantain, red banana, apple banana, and Cavendish banana
- Source plant(s): Musa
- Part(s) of plant: Fruit
- Uses: Food

A banana is an elongated, edible fruit that is botanically a berry produced by several kinds of large treelike herbaceous flowering plants in the genus Musa. In some countries, cooking bananas are called plantains, distinguishing them from dessert bananas. The fruit is variable in size, color and firmness, but is usually elongated and curved, with soft flesh rich in starch covered with a peel, which may have a variety of colors when ripe. It grows upward in clusters near the top of the plant. Almost all modern edible seedless (parthenocarp) cultivated bananas come from two wild species – Musa acuminata and Musa balbisiana, or their hybrids.

Musa species are native to tropical Indomalaya and Australia; they were probably domesticated in New Guinea. They are grown in 135 countries, primarily for their fruit, and to a lesser extent to make banana paper and textiles, while some are grown as ornamental plants. The world's largest producers of bananas in 2022 were India and China, which together accounted for approximately 26% of total production. Bananas are eaten raw or cooked in recipes varying from curries to banana chips, fritters, fruit preserves, or simply baked or steamed.

The term "banana" is applied also to other members of the Musa genus, such as the scarlet banana (Musa coccinea), the pink banana (Musa velutina), and the Fe'i bananas. Members of the genus Ensete, such as the snow banana (Ensete glaucum) and the economically important false banana (Ensete ventricosum) of Africa are sometimes included. Both genera are in the banana family, Musaceae.

Banana plantations can be damaged by parasitic nematodes and insect pests, and to fungal and bacterial diseases, one of the most serious being Panama disease which is caused by a Fusarium fungus. This and black sigatoka threaten the production of Cavendish bananas, the main kind eaten in the Western world, which is a triploid Musa acuminata. Plant breeders are seeking new varieties, but these are difficult to breed given that commercial varieties are seedless. To enable future breeding, banana germplasm is conserved in multiple gene banks around the world.

== Description ==
The banana plant is the largest herbaceous flowering plant. All the above-ground parts of a banana plant grow from a structure called a corm. Plants are normally tall and fairly sturdy with a tree-like appearance, but what appears to be a trunk is actually a pseudostem composed of multiple leaf-stalks (petioles). Bananas grow in a wide variety of soils, as long as it is at least 60 centimetres (2.0 ft) deep, has good drainage and is not compacted. They are fast-growing plants, with a growth rate of the sheathing leaves of up to 1.6 metres (5.2 ft) per day; the woody stalk that later bears the fruits grows more slowly.

The leaves of banana plants are composed of a stalk (petiole) and a blade (lamina). The base of the petiole widens to form a sheath; the tightly packed sheaths make up the pseudostem, which is all that supports the plant. The edges of the sheath meet when it is first produced, making it tubular. As new growth occurs in the centre of the pseudostem, the edges are forced apart. Cultivated banana plants vary in height depending on the variety and growing conditions. Most are around 5 m (16 ft) tall, with a range from 'Dwarf Cavendish' plants at around 3 m (9.8 ft) to 'Gros Michel' at 7 m (23 ft) or more. Leaves are spirally arranged and may grow 2.7 metres (8.9 ft) long and 60 cm (2.0 ft) wide. When a banana plant is mature, the corm stops producing new leaves and begins to form a flower spike or inflorescence. A stem develops which grows up inside the pseudostem, carrying the immature inflorescence until eventually it emerges at the top. Each pseudostem normally produces a single inflorescence, also known as the "banana heart". After fruiting, the pseudostem dies, but offshoots will normally have developed from the base, so that the plant as a whole is perennial. The inflorescence contains many petal-like bracts between rows of flowers. The female flowers (which can develop into fruit) appear in rows further up the stem (closer to the leaves) from the rows of male flowers. The ovary is inferior, meaning that the tiny petals and other flower parts appear at the tip of the ovary.

The banana fruits develop from the banana heart, in a large hanging cluster called a bunch, made up of around nine tiers called hands, with up to 20 fruits to a hand. A bunch can weigh 22–65 kilograms (49–143 lb). The stalk ends of the fruits connect up to the rachis part of the inflorescence. Opposite the stalk end, is the blossom end, where the remnants of the flower deviate the texture from the rest of the flesh inside the peel.

The fruit has been described as a "leathery berry". There is a protective outer layer (a peel or skin) with numerous long, thin strings (vascular bundles), which run lengthwise between the skin and the edible inner white flesh. The peel is less palatable and usually discarded after peeling the fruit. The inner part of the common yellow dessert variety can be split lengthwise into three sections that correspond to the inner portions of the three carpels by manually deforming the unopened fruit. In cultivated varieties, fertile seeds are usually absent.

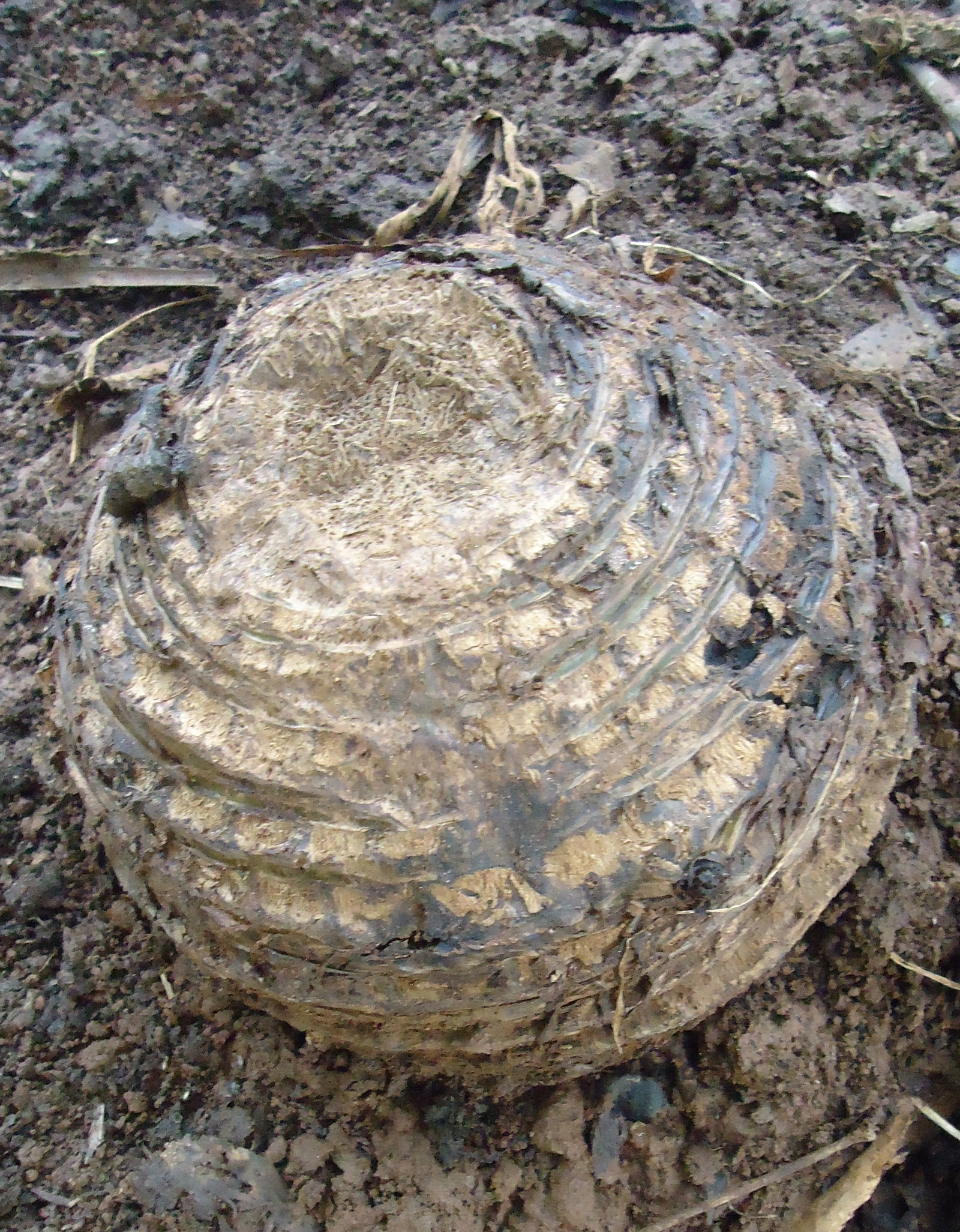
A corm, about 25 cm (10 in) across

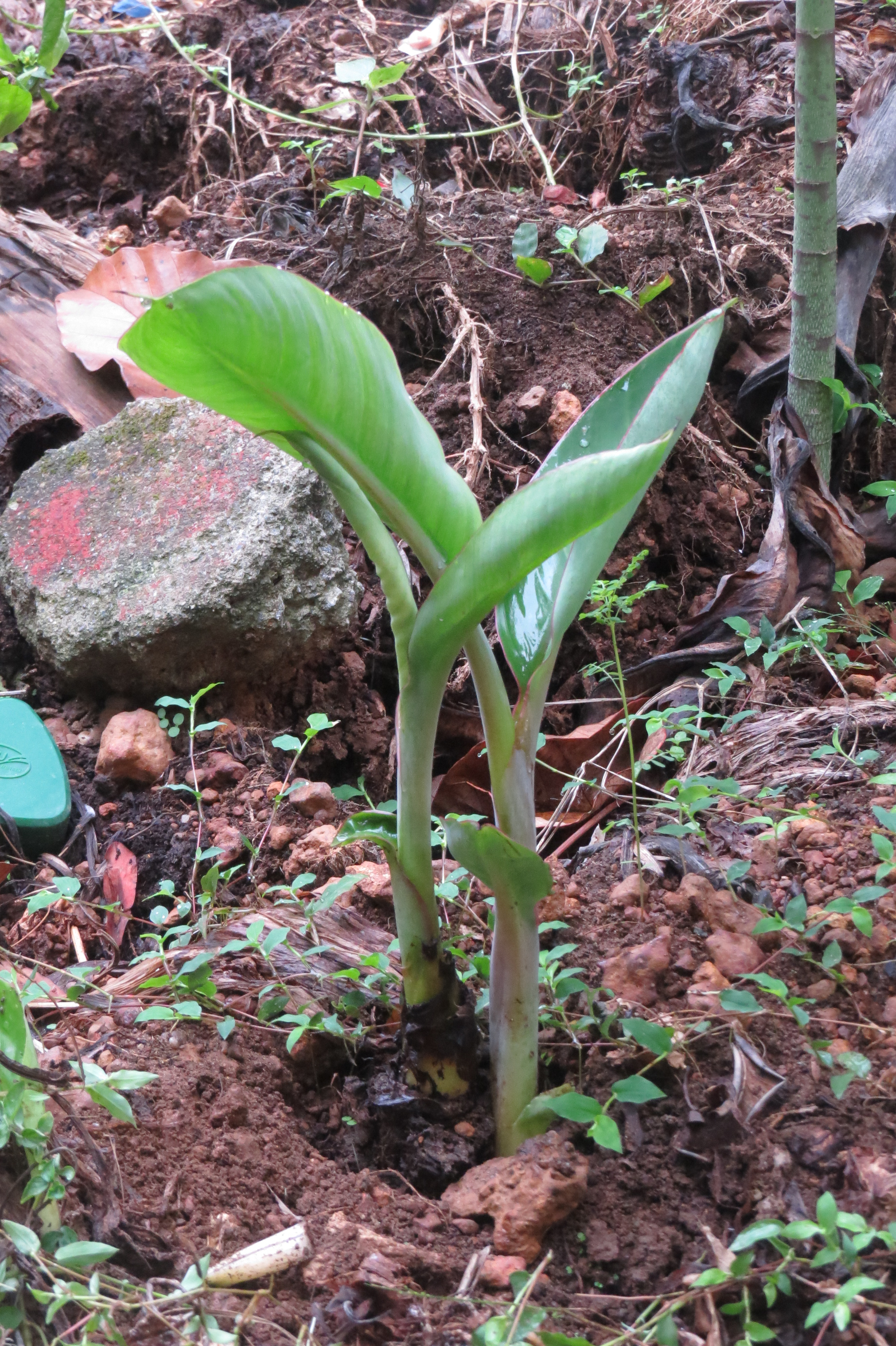
Young plant

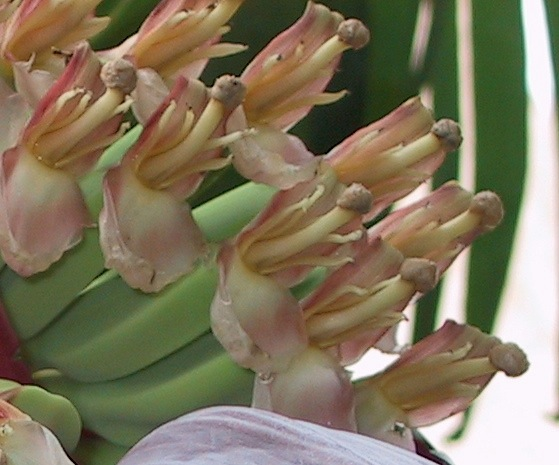
Female flowers have petals at the tip of the ovary

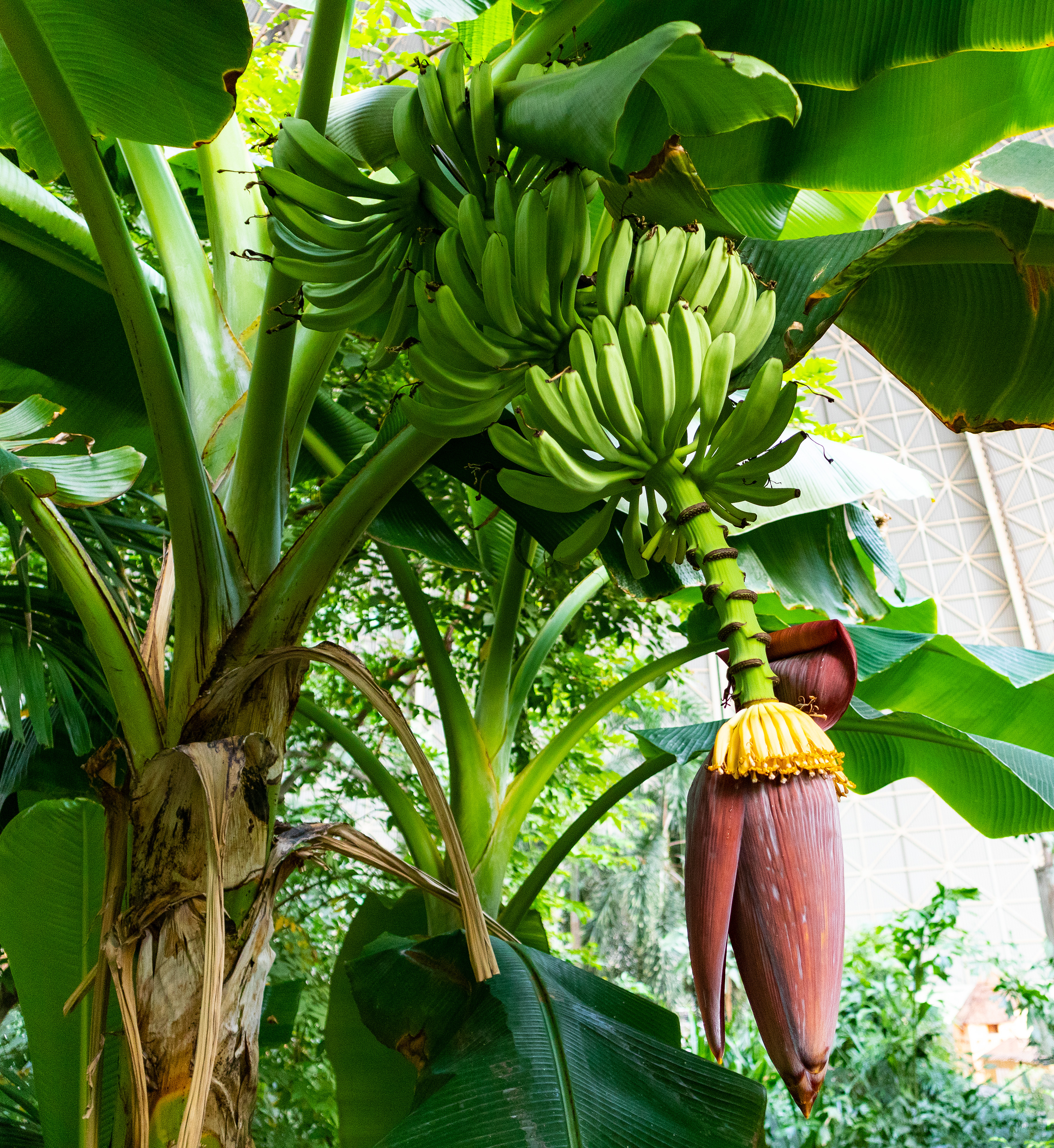
'Tree' showing fruit and inflorescence

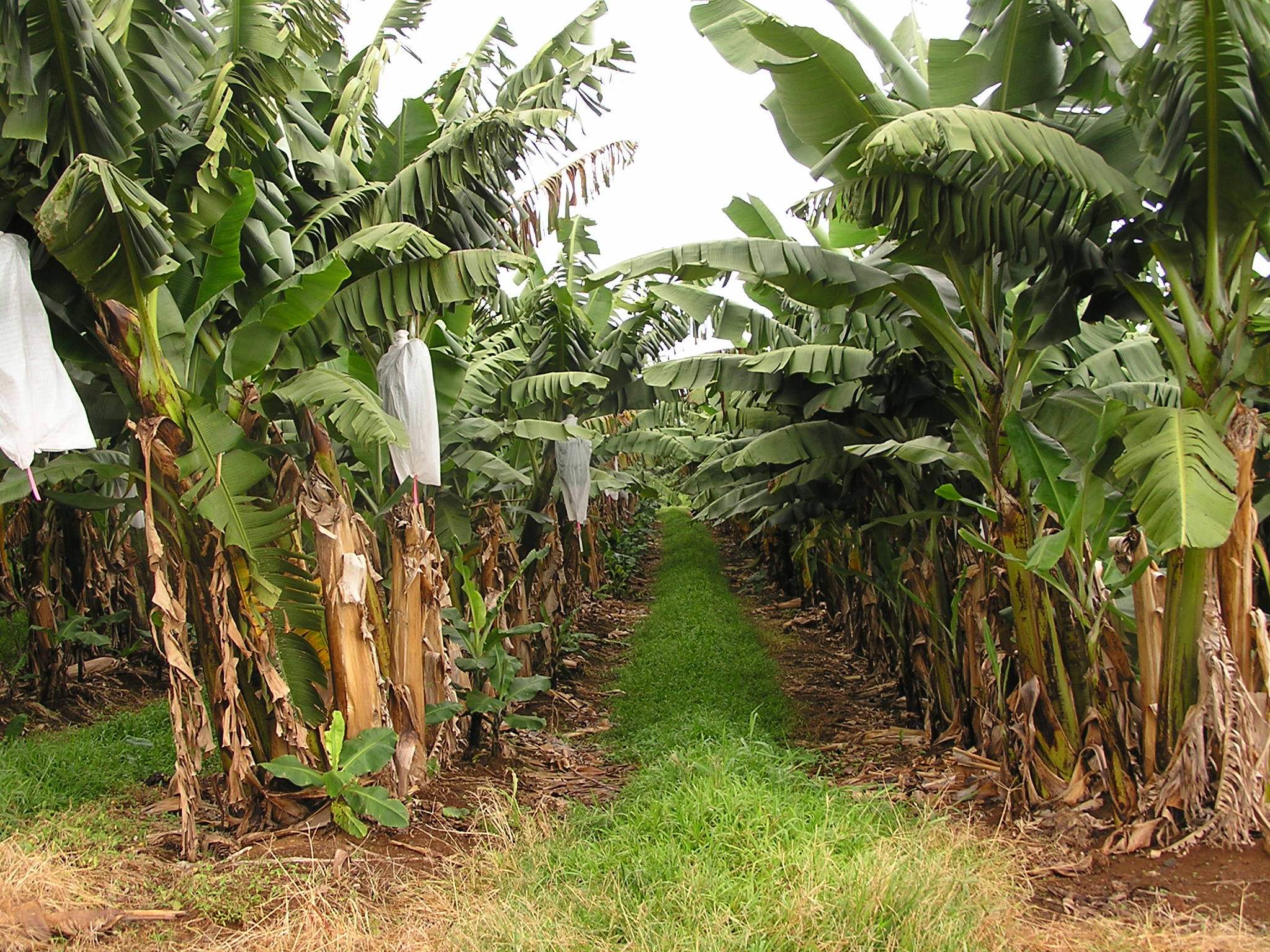
Single row planting

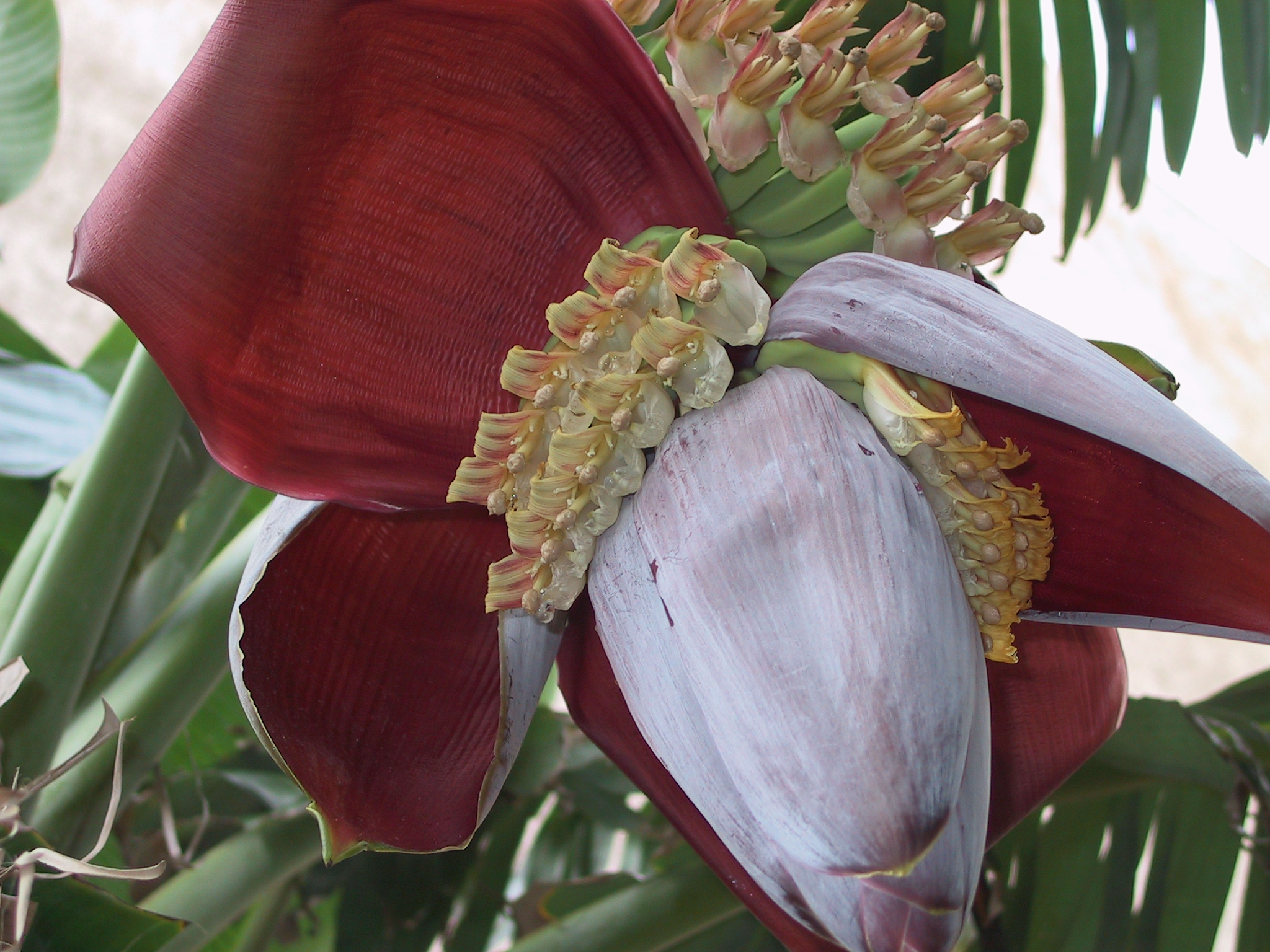
Inflorescence, partially opened

== Evolution ==
=== Phylogeny ===
A 2011 phylogenomic analysis using nuclear genes indicates the phylogeny of some representatives of the Musaceae family. Major edible kinds of banana are shown in boldface.

- Musaceae
  - Ensete ventricosum, Enset or false banana of Africa
  - Musella lasiocarpa, Golden lotus banana of China
  - Musa
    - Clade I
      - Musa balbisiana, **Plantain**^{‡} of South, East, and Southeast Asia
      - - Musa mannii, a wild banana of Arunachal Pradesh, India
        - - Musa acuminata ssp. zebrina, **Blood banana** of Sumatra
          - - Musa acuminata ssp. burmannica, **Banana**^{‡}, S. India to Cambodia
            - Musa ornata, Flowering banana of Southeast Asia
    - Clade II
      - Musa coccinea, Scarlet banana of China and Vietnam
      - - Musa beccarii, a wild banana of Sabah
        - - Musa textilis, Abacá or Manila hemp of the Philippines
          - - Musa maclayi of Papua New Guinea and Solomon Islands
            - Musa x troglodytarum, Fe'i banana of French Polynesia

^{‡} Many cultivated bananas are hybrids of M. acuminata x M. balbisiana (not shown in tree).

Work by Li and colleagues in 2024 identifies three subspecies of M. acuminata, namely sspp. banksii, malaccensis, and zebrina, as contributing substantially to the Ban, Dh, and Ze subgenomes of triploid cultivated bananas respectively.

=== Taxonomy ===
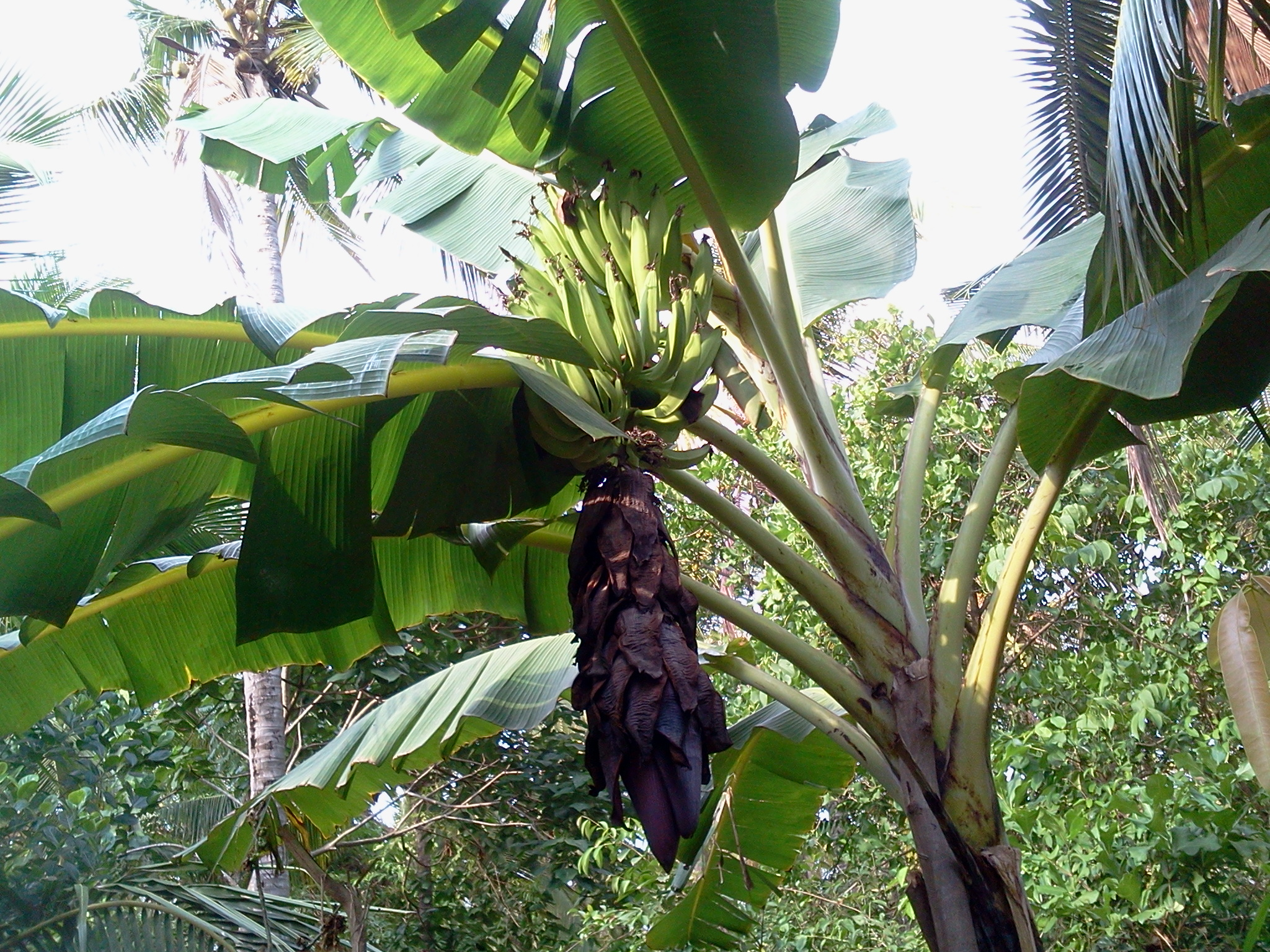
Musa 'Nendran' cultivar, grown widely in the Indian state of Kerala

The genus Musa was created by Carl Linnaeus in 1753. The name may be derived from Antonius Musa, physician to the Emperor Augustus, or Linnaeus may have adapted the Arabic word for banana, mauz. The ultimate origin of musa may be in the Trans–New Guinea languages, which have words similar to "#muku"; from there the name was borrowed into the Austronesian languages and across Asia, accompanying the cultivation of the banana as it was brought to new areas, via the Dravidian languages of India, into Arabic as a Wanderwort. The word "banana" is thought to be of West African origin, possibly from the Wolof word banaana, and passed into English via Spanish or Portuguese.

Musa is the type genus in the family Musaceae. The APG III system assigns Musaceae to the order Zingiberales, part of the commelinid clade of the monocotyledonous flowering plants. Some 85 species of Musa were recognized by Plants of the World Online as of July 2025; several produce edible fruit, while others are cultivated as ornamentals.

The classification of cultivated bananas has long been a problematic issue for taxonomists. Linnaeus originally placed bananas into two species based only on their uses as food: Musa sapientum for dessert bananas and Musa paradisiaca for plantains. More species names were added, but this approach proved to be inadequate for the number of cultivars in the primary center of diversity of the genus, Southeast Asia. Many of these cultivars were given names that were later discovered to be synonyms.

In a series of papers published from 1947 onward, Ernest Cheesman showed that Linnaeus's Musa sapientum and Musa paradisiaca were cultivars and descendants of two wild seed-producing species, Musa acuminata and Musa balbisiana, both first described by Luigi Aloysius Colla. Cheesman recommended the abolition of Linnaeus's species in favor of reclassifying bananas according to three morphologically distinct groups of cultivars – those primarily exhibiting the botanical characteristics of Musa balbisiana, those primarily exhibiting the botanical characteristics of Musa acuminata, and those with characteristics of both. Researchers Norman Simmonds and Ken Shepherd proposed a genome-based nomenclature system in 1955. This system eliminated almost all the difficulties and inconsistencies of the earlier classification of bananas based on assigning scientific names to cultivated varieties. Despite this, the original names are still recognized by some authorities, leading to confusion.

The accepted scientific names for most groups of cultivated bananas are Musa acuminata Colla and Musa balbisiana Colla for the ancestral species, and Musa × paradisiaca L. for the hybrid of the two.

An unusual feature of the genetics of the banana is that chloroplast DNA is inherited maternally, while mitochondrial DNA is inherited paternally. This facilitates taxonomic study of species and subspecies relationships.

=== Informal classification ===
In regions such as North America and Europe, Musa fruits offered for sale can be divided into small sweet "bananas" eaten raw when ripe as a dessert, and large starchy "plantains" or cooking bananas, which do not have to be ripe. Linnaeus made this distinction when naming two "species" of Musa. Members of the "plantain subgroup" of banana cultivars, most important as food in West Africa and Latin America, correspond to this description, having long pointed fruit. They are described by Ploetz et al. as "true" plantains, distinct from other cooking bananas.

The cooking bananas of East Africa belong to a different group, the East African Highland bananas. Further, small farmers in Colombia grow a much wider range of cultivars than large commercial plantations do, and in Southeast Asia—the center of diversity for bananas, both wild and cultivated—the distinction between "bananas" and "plantains" does not work. Many bananas are used both raw and cooked. There are starchy cooking bananas which are smaller than those eaten raw. The range of colors, sizes and shapes is far wider than in those grown or sold in Africa, Europe or the Americas. Southeast Asian languages do not make the distinction between "bananas" and "plantains" that is made in English. Thus both Cavendish dessert bananas and Saba cooking bananas are called pisang in Malaysia and Indonesia, kluai in Thailand and chuối in Vietnam. Fe'i bananas, grown and eaten in the islands of the Pacific, are derived from a different wild species. Most Fe'i bananas are cooked, but Karat bananas, which are short and squat with bright red skins, are eaten raw.

== History ==
Original native ranges of the ancestors of modern edible bananas. Musa acuminata Musa balbisiana

=== Domestication ===
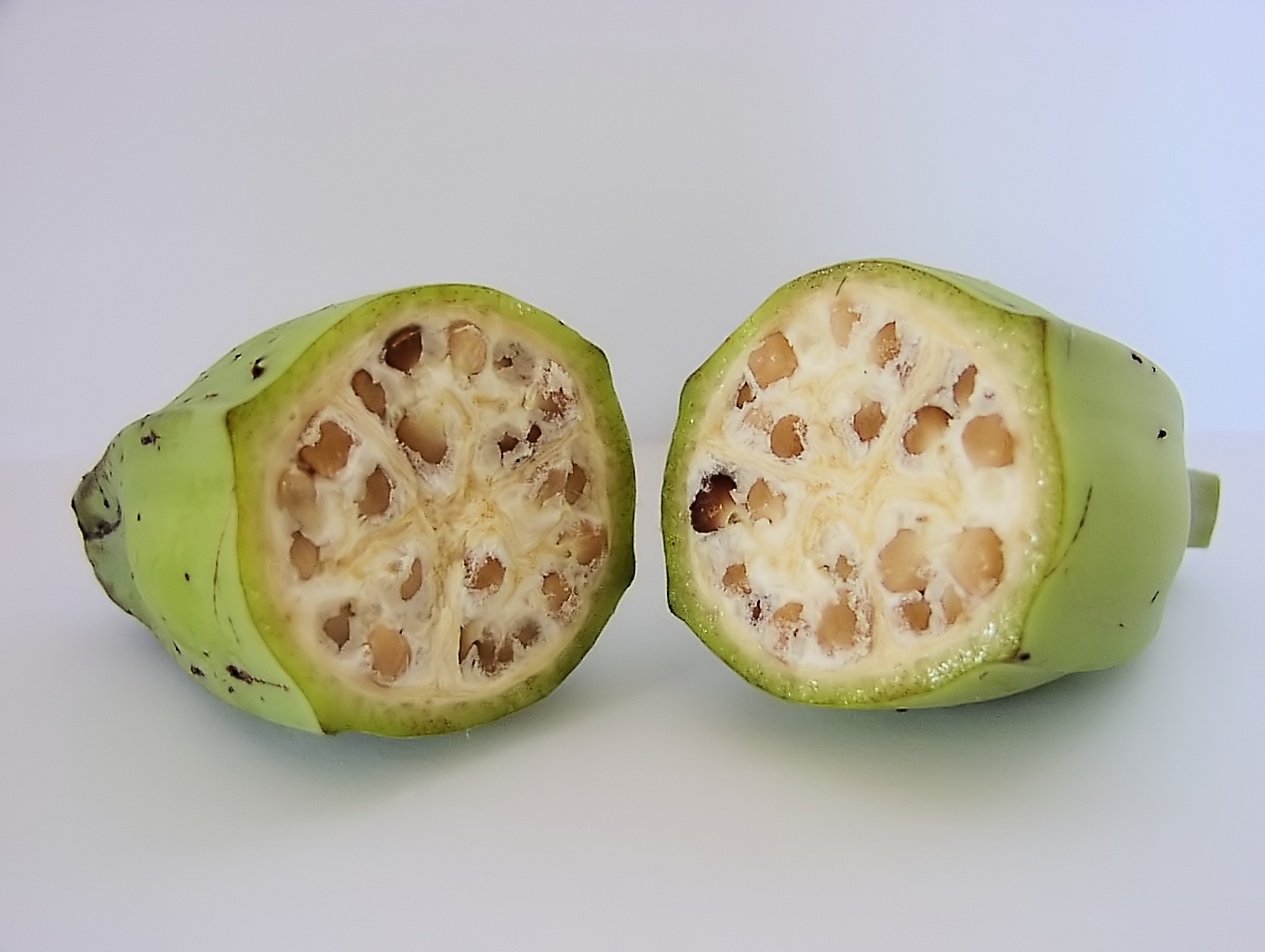
Fruits of wild-type bananas have numerous large, hard seeds.

The earliest domestication of bananas (Musa spp.) was from naturally occurring parthenocarpic (seedless) individuals of Musa banksii in New Guinea. These were cultivated by Papuans before the arrival of Austronesian-speakers. Numerous phytoliths of bananas have been recovered from the Kuk Swamp archaeological site and dated to around 10,000 to 6,500 BP. Foraging humans in this area began domestication in the late Pleistocene using transplantation and early cultivation methods. Various investigations – including Denham et al., 2003 – determine that by the early to middle of the Holocene the process was complete.

=== Ancient spread ===
From New Guinea, cultivated bananas spread westward into Island Southeast Asia. They hybridized with other (possibly independently domesticated) subspecies of Musa acuminata as well as M. balbisiana in the Philippines, northern New Guinea, and possibly Halmahera. These hybridization events produced the triploid cultivars of bananas commonly grown today. From Island Southeast Asia, they became part of the staple domesticated crops of the Austronesian peoples and were spread via their ancient seaborne migrations and ancient maritime trading routes into Oceania, Africa, South Asia, and Indochina.

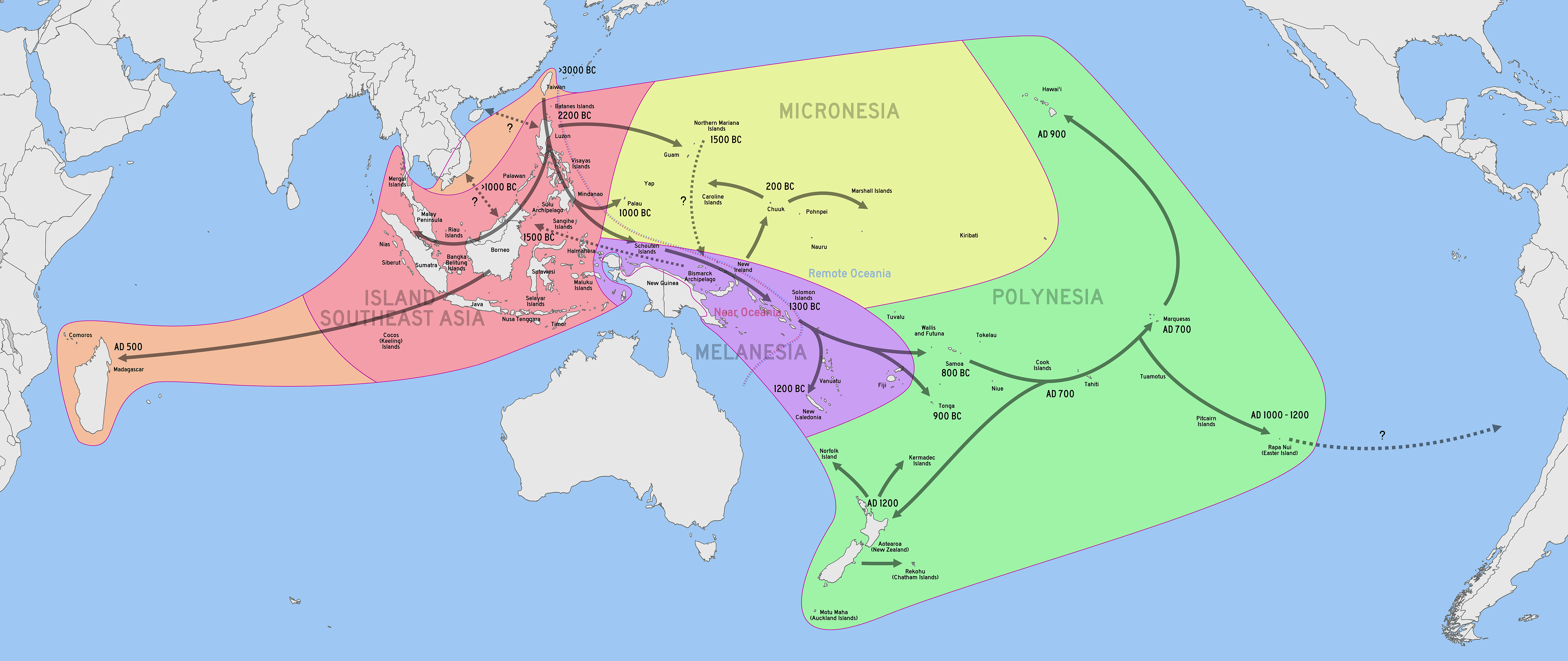
Chronological dispersal of Austronesian peoples across the Indo-Pacific

Bananas are believed to have been introduced to Africa from Southeast Asia via the Austronesian settlement of Madagascar (c. 600 AD). This is supported by relict populations of accidentally-introduced seeded Musa acuminata in northeastern Madagascar and Tanzania's Pemba Island, as well as the phenotypes of cultivated polyploid bananas, and their distribution, evidence of a Southeast Asian origin. However, the role of Madagascar as a staging board for the dispersal of bananas is unclear. Malagasy people colonized Madagascar from Island Southeast Asia around 600 AD onwards, but contact between East Africa and Island Southeast Asia dates back to at least 300 BC or earlier. The possibility that bananas may have been introduced from earlier Austronesian settlements in the East African coast that pre-date the settlement of Madagascar can not be ruled out. Carbon dating of phytolith remains from archaeological sites in present-day Cameroon provides evidence that bananas were cultivated on the continent earlier than 300 BC.

These ancient introductions resulted in the banana subgroup now known as the "true" plantains, which include the East African Highland bananas and the Pacific plantains (the Iholena and Maoli-Popo'ulu subgroups). Genetic evidence show that East African Highland bananas (AAA) originated from banana populations introduced to Africa from the region between Java, Borneo, and New Guinea. Pacific plantains (AAB), on the other hand, were introduced to the Pacific Islands from banana populations originating from either eastern New Guinea or the Bismarck Archipelago.

Another wave of introductions later spread domesticated polyploid bananas to other parts of tropical Asia, particularly Indochina and the Indian subcontinent.

Southeast Asia remains the region of primary diversity of the banana. Areas of secondary diversity are found in Africa, indicating a long history of banana cultivation there.

=== Other hypotheses ===
21st century discoveries of alleged banana phytoliths in Uganda and Cameroon dating to the first millennium BC and earlier triggered a debate about the date of the first introduction of bananas to East Africa.

However, the identification of the remains in Uganda as phytoliths, much less banana phytoliths, is now considered dubious. The Cameroon phytoliths, on the other hand, are confirmed as Musa, despite early doubts that they may be from Ensete. However, the incongruous early date (all other archaeobotanical remains of bananas in Africa being from at earliest the first millennium AD) remains questionable due to the low number of phytoliths recovered (25), the absence of additional phytoliths in more recent sediments, and the possibility that the apparent date was the result of stratigraphic mixing. An introduction date of 2000 to 1000 BC is also unlikely as this was long before there were any evidence of agriculture in East Africa. Polyploid banana cultivars are sterile and do not spread without human cultivation.

Similarly, phytoliths recovered from the Kot Diji archaeological site in Pakistan were interpreted as evidence that bananas were known to the Indus Valley civilisation. This may indicate very early dispersal of bananas by Austronesian traders by sea from as early as 2000 BCE. But this is still putative, as they may have come from local wild Musa species used for fiber or as ornamentals, not food; and banana phytoliths are absent in other contemporary sites in South Asia.

Glucanase and two other proteins specific to Musaceae were found in dental calculus from the early Iron Age (12th century BCE) Philistines in Tel Erani in the southern Levant. However, the authors only tentatively identify it as Musa, as the proteins can also be found in Ensete (cultivated for their edible corms and pseudostems in Africa).

=== Arab Agricultural Revolution ===
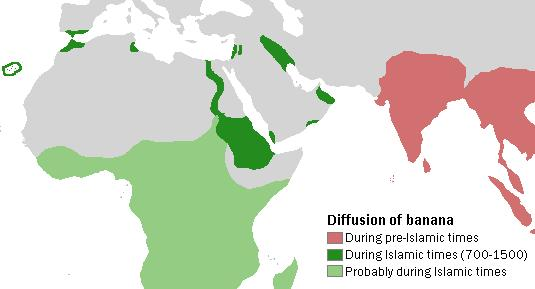
Actual and probable diffusion of bananas during the Arab Agricultural Revolution (700–1500 CE)

The banana may have been present in isolated locations in the Middle East on the eve of Islam. The spread of Islam was followed by far-reaching diffusion. There are numerous references to it in Islamic texts (such as poems and hadiths) from the 9th century onwards. By the 10th century, the banana appeared in texts from Palestine and Egypt. From there, it diffused into North Africa and Al-Andalus (Islamic Spain) during the Arab Agricultural Revolution. An article on banana tree cultivation is included in Ibn al-'Awwam's 12th-century agricultural work, Kitāb al-Filāḥa (Book on Agriculture). During the Middle Ages, bananas from Granada were considered among the best in the Arab world. Bananas were certainly grown in the Christian Kingdom of Cyprus by the late medieval period. Writing in 1458, the Italian traveller and writer Gabriele Capodilista wrote favourably of the extensive farm produce of the estates at Episkopi, near modern-day Limassol, including the area's banana plantations.

=== Early modern spread ===
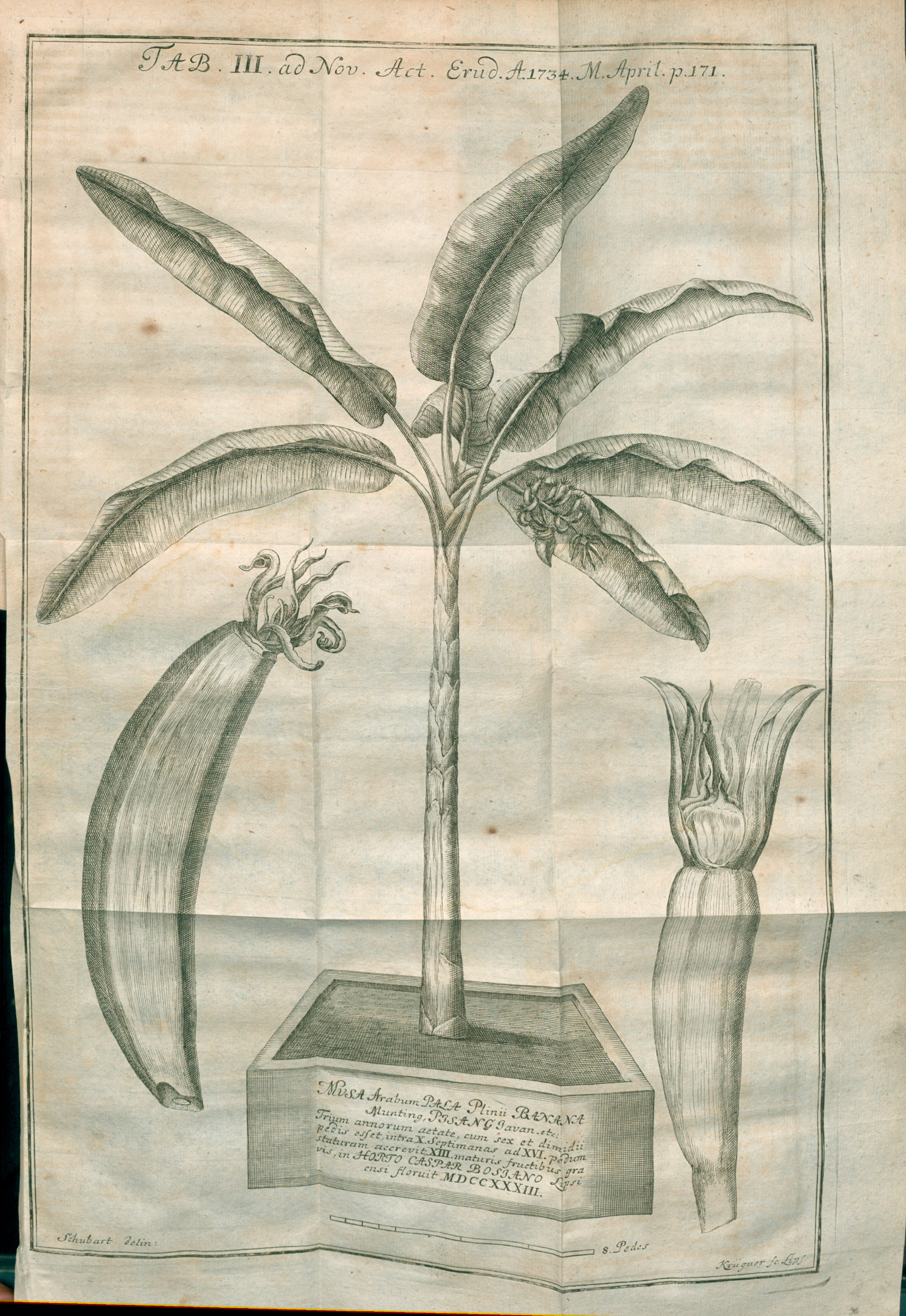
Illustration of fruit and plant, Acta Eruditorum, 1734

In the early modern period, bananas were encountered by European explorers during the Magellan expedition in 1521, in both Guam and the Philippines. Lacking a name for the fruit, the ship's historian Antonio Pigafetta described them as "figs more than one palm long." Bananas were introduced to South America by Portuguese sailors who brought them from West Africa in the 16th century. Southeast Asian banana cultivars, as well as abaca grown for fibers, were introduced to North and Central America by the Spanish from the Philippines, via the Manila galleons.

=== Plantation cultivation ===
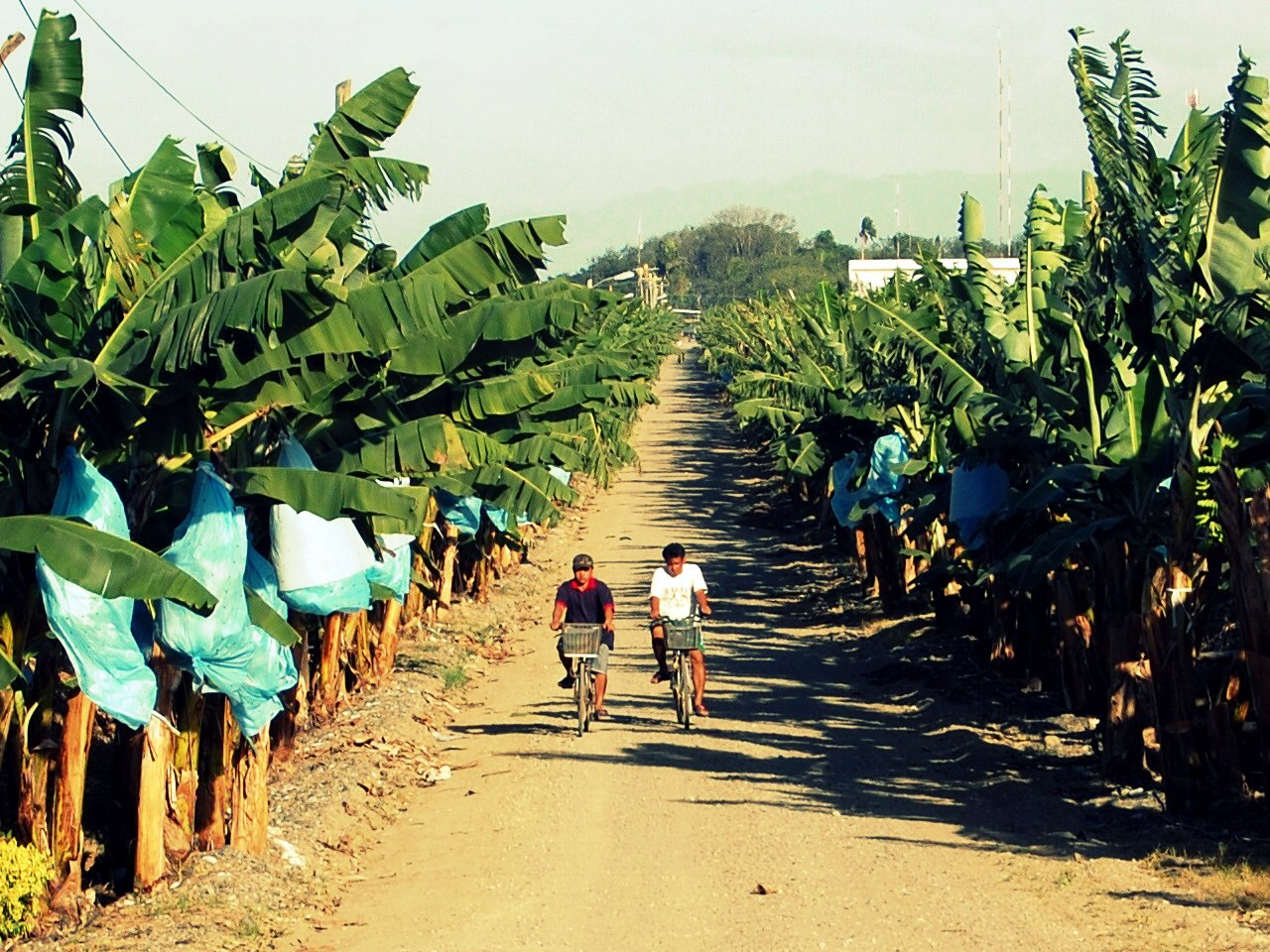
Plantation in the Philippines, 2010

In the 15th and 16th centuries, Portuguese colonists started banana plantations in the Atlantic Islands, Brazil, and western Africa. North Americans began consuming bananas on a small scale at very high prices shortly after the Civil War, though it was only in the 1880s that the food became more widespread. As late as the Victorian Era, bananas were not widely known in Europe, although they were available.

The earliest modern plantations originated in Jamaica and the related Western Caribbean Zone, including most of Central America. Plantation cultivation involved the combination of modern transportation networks of steamships and railroads with the development of refrigeration that allowed more time between harvesting and ripening. North American shippers like Lorenzo Dow Baker and Andrew Preston, the founders of the Boston Fruit Company started this process in the 1870s, with the participation of railroad builders like Minor C. Keith. Development led to the multi-national giant corporations like United Fruit Company (now Chiquita) and Standard Fruit Company (now Dole plc) . These companies were monopolistic, vertically integrated (controlling growing, processing, shipping and marketing) and usually used political manipulation to build enclave economies (internally self-sufficient, virtually tax exempt, and export-oriented, contributing little to the host economy). Their political maneuvers, which gave rise to the term banana republic for states such as Honduras and Guatemala, included working with local elites and their rivalries to influence politics or playing the international interests of the United States, especially during the Cold War, to keep the political climate favorable to their interests.

== Modern cultivation ==
Bananas are propagated asexually from offshoots. The plant is allowed to produce two shoots at a time; a larger one for immediate fruiting and a smaller "sucker" or "follower" to produce fruit in 6–8 months. As a non-seasonal crop, bananas are available fresh year-round. They are grown in some 135 countries.

=== Cavendish ===
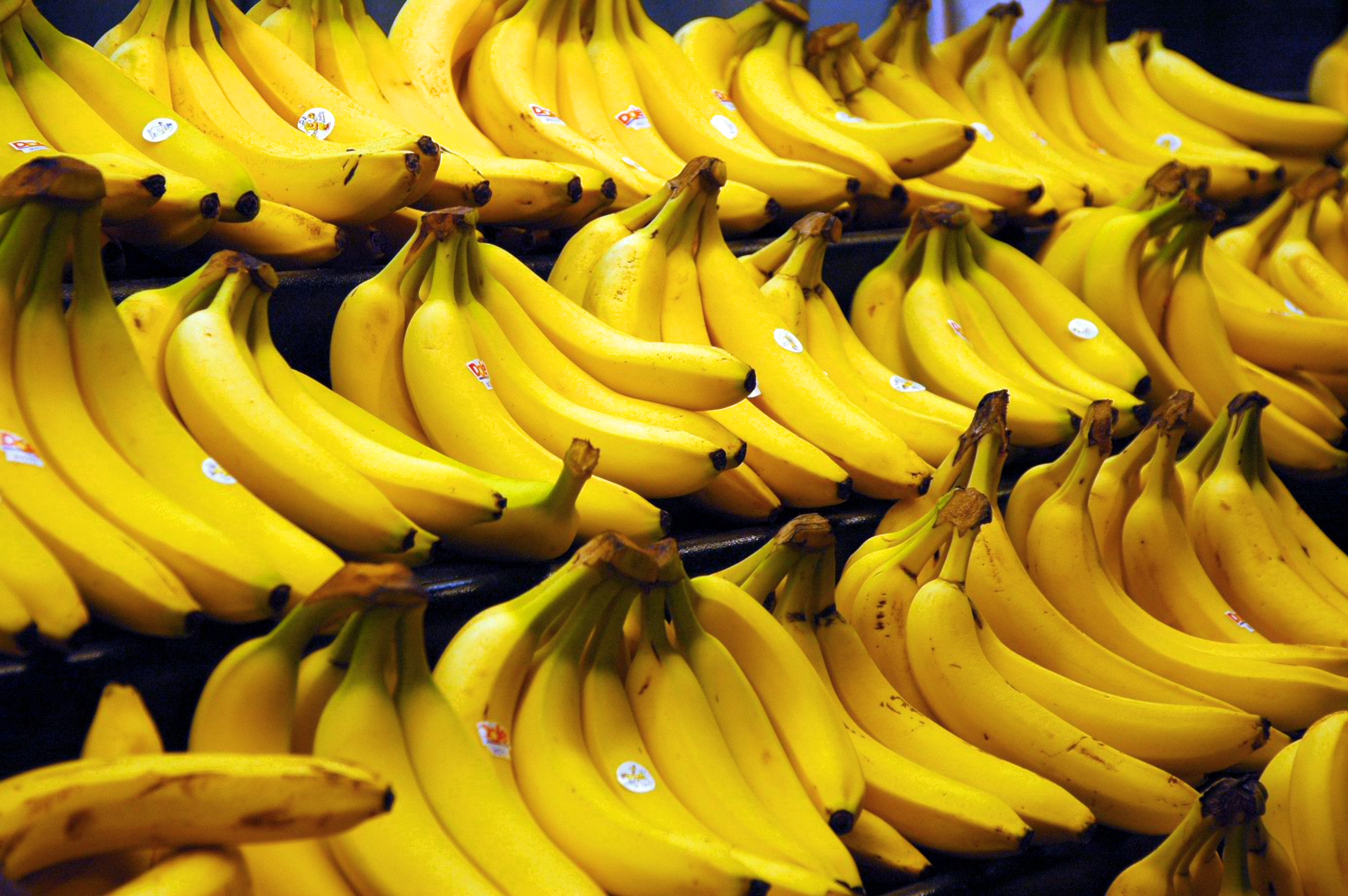
Cultivars in the Cavendish group dominate the world market.

In global commerce in 2009, by far the most important cultivars belonged to the triploid Musa acuminata AAA group of Cavendish group bananas. Disease is threatening the production of the Cavendish banana worldwide. It is unclear if any existing cultivar can replace Cavendish bananas, so various hybridisation and genetic engineering programs are attempting to create a disease-resistant, mass-market banana. One such strain that has emerged is the Taiwanese Cavendish or Formosana.

=== Ripening ===
Export bananas are picked green, and ripened in special rooms upon arrival in the destination country. These rooms are air-tight and filled with ethylene gas to induce ripening, which mimics the normal production of this gas as a ripening hormone. Ethylene stimulates the formation of amylase, an enzyme that breaks down starch into sugar, influencing the taste. Ethylene signals the production of pectinase, a different enzyme which breaks down the pectin between the cells of the banana, causing the banana to soften as it ripens. The vivid yellow color many consumers in temperate climates associate with bananas is caused by ripening around 18 °C (64 °F), and does not occur in Cavendish bananas ripened in tropical temperatures (over 27 °C (81 °F)), which leaves them green.

=== Storage and transport ===
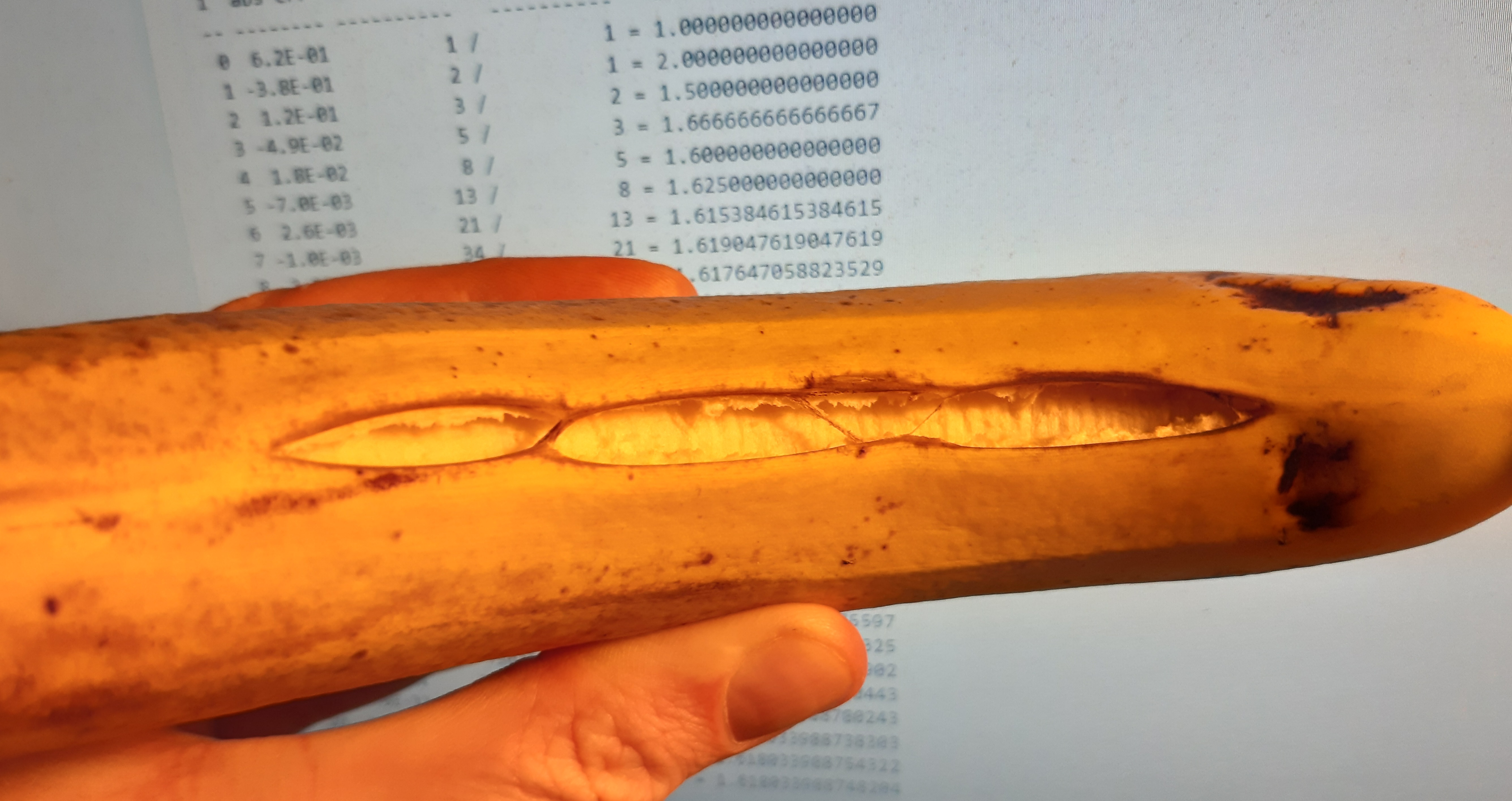
Ralstonia solanacearum on an overripe banana

Bananas are transported over long distances from the tropics to world markets. To obtain maximum shelf life, harvest comes before the fruit is mature. The fruit requires careful handling, rapid transport to ports, cooling, and refrigerated shipping. The goal is to prevent the bananas from producing their natural ripening agent, ethylene. This technology allows storage and transport for 3–4 weeks at 13 °C (55 °F). On arrival, bananas are held at about 17 °C (63 °F) and treated with a low concentration of ethylene. After a few days, the fruit begins to ripen and is distributed for final sale. Ripe bananas can be held for a few days at home. If bananas are too green, they can be put in a brown paper bag with an apple or tomato overnight to speed up the ripening process.

=== Sustainability ===
The excessive use of fertilizers contributes greatly to eutrophication in streams and lakes, harming aquatic life, while expanding banana production has led to deforestation. As soil nutrients are depleted, more forest is cleared for plantations. This causes soil erosion and increases the frequency of flooding.

Voluntary sustainability standards such as Rainforest Alliance and Fairtrade are being used to address some of these issues. Banana production certified in this way grew rapidly at the start of the 21st century to represent 36% of banana exports by 2016. However, such standards are applied mainly in countries which focus on the export market, such as Colombia, Costa Rica, Ecuador, and Guatemala; worldwide they cover only 8–10% of production.

=== Small-scale cultivation ===
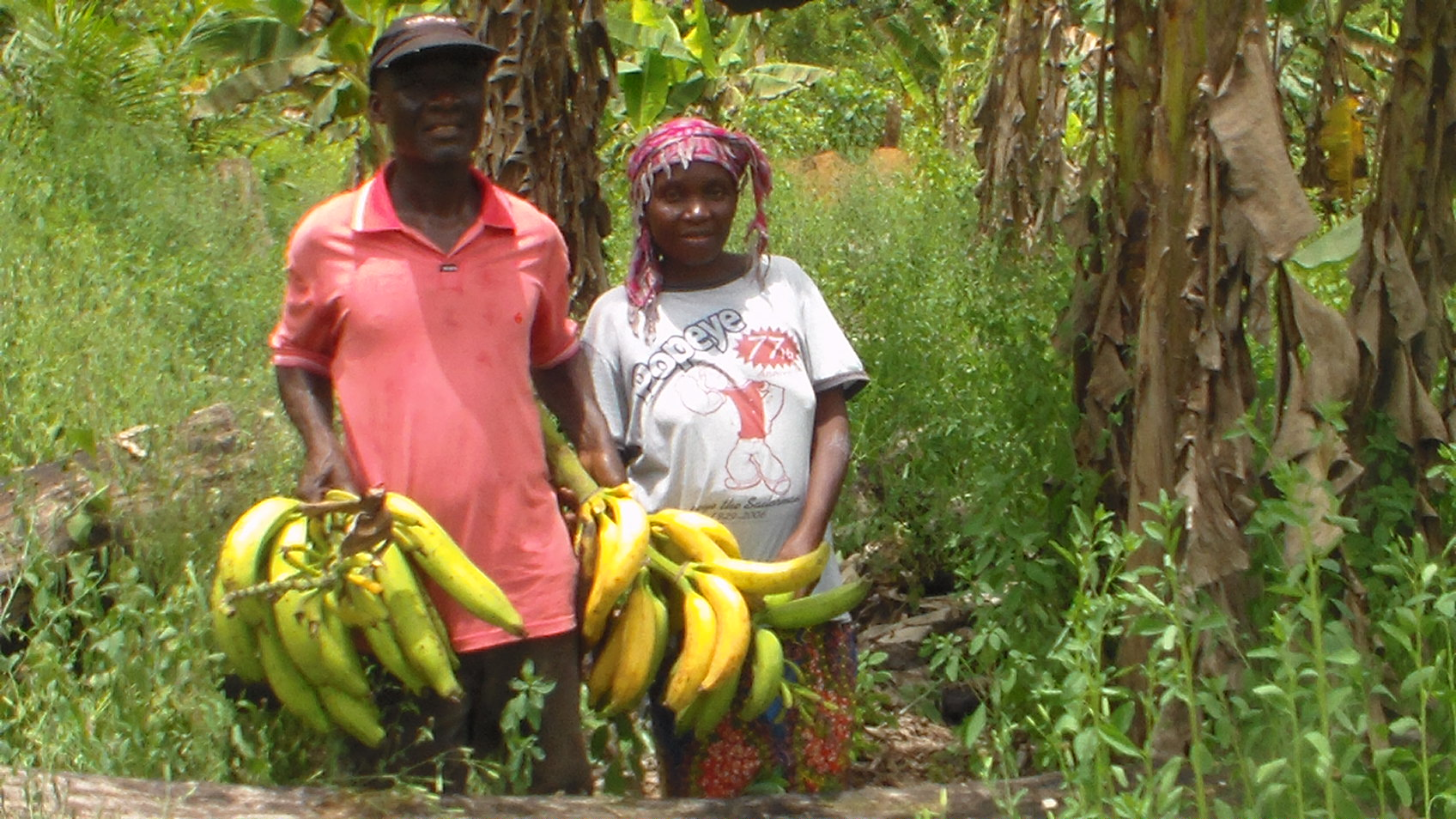
Small-scale banana production, Liberia, 2013

The vast majority of the world's bananas are cultivated for family consumption or for sale on local markets. They are grown in large quantities in India, while many other Asian and African countries host numerous small-scale banana growers who sell at least some of their crop. Peasants with smallholdings of 1 to 2 acres in the Caribbean produce bananas for the world market, often alongside other crops. In many tropical countries, the main cultivars produce green (unripe) bananas used for cooking. Because bananas and plantains produce fruit year-round, they provide a valuable food source during the hunger season between harvests of other crops, and are thus important for global food security.

== Breeding ==
Edible bananas are parthenocarpic (seedless). This is important for their edibility, but the lack of seed production makes breeding difficult. Furthermore, cultivated bananas are typically triploid (less commonly diploid, and a few tetraploid). They are typically derived from the wild diploid species M. acuminata and M. balbisiana, although some originate from M. acuminata only. Unpaired chromosomes in triploids, homoeologous recombination between chromosomes from the two ancestral species, and failures to produce functional reproductive structures (due to selection for parthenocarpy) all combine to cause extremely low frequencies of successful seed production when attempting to breed bananas. Starting in the 1920s, "pedigree breeding" has been employed to try to generate desirable hybrids. Existing triploids are bred against diploids, sometimes wild with a desired characteristic, trying to create a tetraploid by combining a haploid gamete from the diploid parent with a (rare) unreduced triploid gamete from the other. The resulting tetraploid can then be bred against another diploid to produce triploid offspring. More recently, the "reproductive breeding" strategy treats diploids with colchicine to produce tetraploid offspring, which can then be bred against a second diploid to produce triploids.

Mutation breeding can be used in this crop. Aneuploidy is a source of significant variation in allotriploid varieties. For one example, it can be a source of TR4 resistance. Lab protocols have been devised to screen for such aberrations and for possible resulting disease resistances. Wild Musa spp. provide useful resistance genetics, and are vital to breeding for TR4 resistance, as shown in introgressed resistance from wild relatives.

The Honduran Foundation for Agricultural Research has bred a seedless banana that is resistant to both Panama disease and black Sigatoka disease. The team made use of the fact that "seedless" varieties do rarely produce seeds; they obtained around 15 seeds from some 30,000 cultivated plants, pollinated by hand with pollen from wild Asian bananas.

== Production ==
2022 production (in millions of tonnes)
	Bananas	Plantains	Total
India	34.5		34.5
China	11.8		11.8
Uganda		10.4	10.4
Indonesia	9.2		9.2
Philippines	5.9	3.1	9.0
Nigeria	8.0		8.0
Ecuador	6.1	0.9	6.9
Brazil	6.9		6.9
Democratic Republic of the Congo	0.8	4.9	5.7
Cameroon	0.9	4.7	5.5
Colombia	2.5	2.5	5.0
Guatemala	4.8	0.3	5.0
Ghana	0.1	4.8	4.9
Angola	4.6		4.6
Tanzania	3.5	0.6	4.1
Rwanda	2.2	0.9	3.1
Costa Rica	2.5	0.1	2.6
Ivory Coast	0.5	2.1	2.6
Mexico	2.6		2.6
Dominican Republic	1.4	1.2	2.5
Vietnam	2.5		2.5
Peru	2.4		2.4
World	135.1	44.2	179.3
Source: FAOSTAT of the United Nations Note: Some countries distinguish between bananas and plantains, but four of the top six producers do not, thus necessitating comparisons using the total for bananas and plantains combined.

As of 2018, bananas are exported in larger volume and to a larger value than any other fruit. In 2022, world production of bananas and plantains combined was 179 million tonnes, led by India and China with a combined total of 26% of global production. Other major producers were Uganda, Indonesia, the Philippines, Nigeria and Ecuador. As reported for 2013, total world exports were 20 million tonnes of bananas and 859,000 tonnes of plantains. Ecuador and the Philippines were the leading exporters with 5.4 and 3.3 million tonnes, respectively, and the Dominican Republic was the leading exporter of plantains with 210,350 tonnes.

Banana production

Banana yields

== Ecology ==
Banana production is affected by climate change through temperature, water stress, geography, light exposure, pests and disease, and carbon dioxide. Overall, climate change from 1961 to 2016 suggests that climate change has had a net benefit on banana yields due to rising temperatures, but that these benefits are tapering off due to increased water demand and the challenge of growing companion crops like coffee.

Climate change effects vary greatly by region; study investigating climate change risk across the multiple countries responsible for 86% of banana production found Brazil, Colombia, Nicaragua, Panama, Malaysia to be 'at-risk', where banana yields are predicted to decline in response to climate change, while African countries as well as Honduras and Ecuador are predicted to be advantaged by climate change. Some major producing countries, notably India and China, are considered 'adaptable' as while they do show potential negative effects of climate change on yields, strong technology-yield trends may mitigate climate-driven yield declines. Shifting bioclimatic zones in some areas, such as Nepal, mean that banana cultivation may increase in some areas as other crops, such as coffee, suffer the effects of climate change in the same region. One study indicated the amount of area suited to banana growing in Nepal will grow by 40% by 2050, with some case studies showing benefit from the agroforestry technique of coffee-banana intercropping. As part of these adaptations, "market opportunities for smallholder farmers need to be properly addressed through cooperatives or other such local bodies which secure adequate prices for farmers" (p. 14)

Some banana diseases have spread in area due to climate change – for example, Black Sigatoka has spread from Honduras to Brazil, the Caribbean, and most recently, Florida. Banana growing in Latin America and the Caribbean are predicted to have an increased risk of infection due to increased spore germination and growth, and wetter crop canopies. However, predictions for Brazil suggest that due to reduced humidity, areas favorable to Black Sigatoka may decrease.

Bananas are negatively affected by flooding brought on or made worse by climate change. Even in areas where drying reduces disease risk, the investment in needed irrigation systems could pressure freshwater resources and thus, "the impact of future climate change on banana production from the perspective of management must consider both the disease and the host" (p. 6). Also, farmers are limited by resources in drought management activities such as weeding, mulching, irrigation costs, and extra labor (p. 18). Methods for mitigating adverse environmental impacts on banana production include cultivating "climate-resistant cultivars, integrated pest management, soil nutrient management, and disease management using agroforestry systems."

== Pests ==
Bananas are damaged by a variety of pests, especially nematodes and insects.

=== Nematodes ===
Banana roots are subject to damage from multiple species of parasitic nematodes. Radopholus similis causes nematode root rot, the most serious nematode disease of bananas in economic terms. Root-knot is the result of infection by species of Meloidogyne, while root-lesion is caused by species of Pratylenchus, and spiral nematode root damage is the result of infection by Helicotylenchus species.

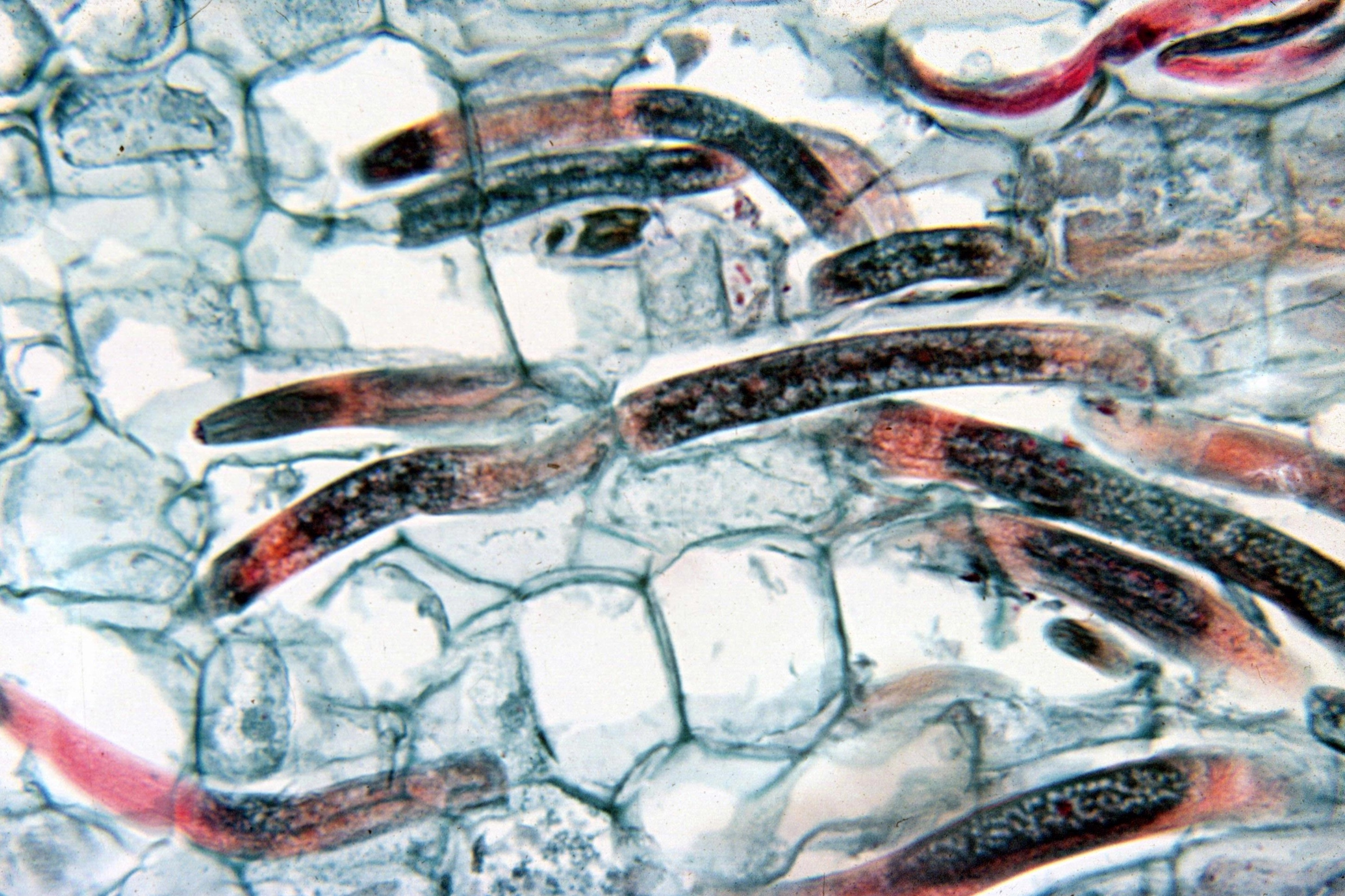
Radopholus similis inside banana root, causing nematode root rot

=== Insects ===
Among the main insect pests of banana cultivation are two beetles that cause substantial economic losses, the banana borer Cosmopolites sordidus and the banana stem weevil Odoiporus longicollis. Other significant pests include aphids and scarring beetles.

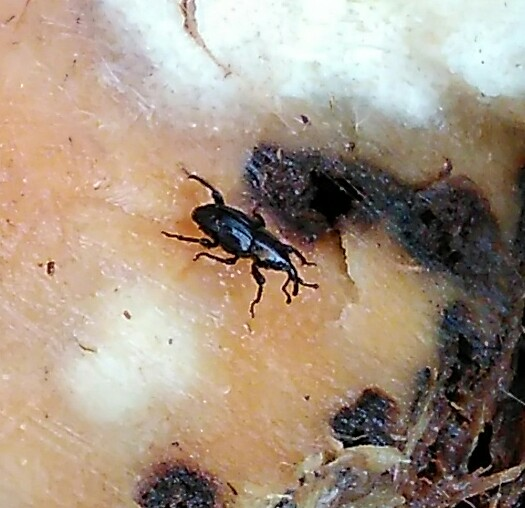
The banana borer is a destructive pest that tunnels inside the plant.

== Diseases ==
Although in no danger of outright extinction, bananas of the Cavendish group, which dominate the global market, are under threat. There is a need to enrich banana biodiversity by producing diverse new banana varieties, not just focusing on the Cavendish. Its predecessor 'Gros Michel', discovered in the 1820s, was similarly dominant but had to be replaced after widespread infections of Panama disease. Monocropping of Cavendish similarly leaves it susceptible to disease and so threatens both commercial cultivation and small-scale subsistence farming. Within the data gathered from the genes of hundreds of bananas, the botanist Julie Sardos has found several wild banana ancestors currently unknown to scientists, whose genes could provide a means of defense against banana crop diseases.

Some commentators have remarked that those variants which could replace what much of the world considers a "typical banana" are so different that most people would not consider them the same fruit, and blame the decline of the banana on monogenetic cultivation driven by short-term commercial motives. Overall, fungal diseases are disproportionately important to small island developing states.

=== Panama disease ===
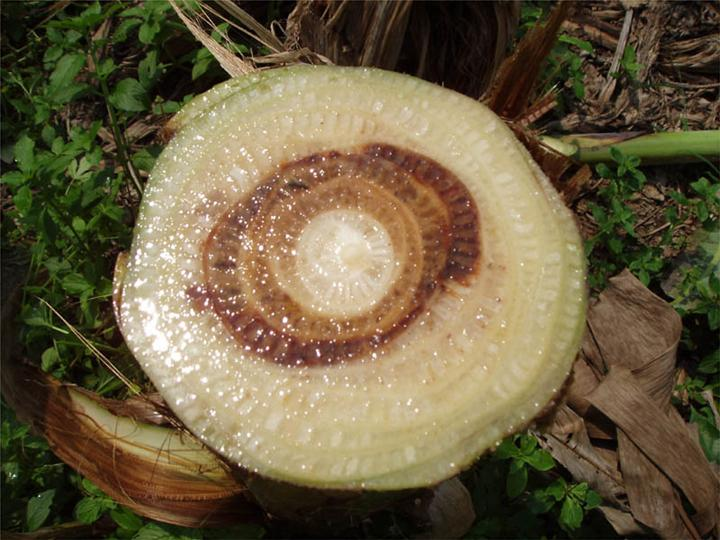
Panama disease Fusarium fungus climbing up through the banana stem

Panama disease is caused by a Fusarium soil fungus, which enters the plants through the roots and travels with water into the trunk and leaves, producing gels and gums that cut off the flow of water and nutrients, causing the plant to wilt, and exposing the rest of the plant to lethal amounts of sunlight. Prior to 1960, almost all commercial banana production centered on the Gros Michel cultivar, which was highly susceptible. Cavendish was chosen as the replacement for Gros Michel because, among resistant cultivars, it produces the highest quality fruit. It requires more care during shipping, and its quality compared to Gros Michel is debated.

==== Fusarium wilt TR4 ====
Fusarium wilt TR4, a reinvigorated strain of Panama disease, was discovered in 1993. This virulent form of Fusarium wilt has destroyed Cavendish plantations in several southeast Asian countries and spread to Australia and India. As the soil-based fungi can easily be carried on boots, clothing, or tools, the wilt spread to the Americas despite years of preventive efforts. Without genetic diversity, Cavendish is highly susceptible to TR4, and the disease endangers its commercial production worldwide. The only known defense to TR4 is genetic resistance. This is conferred either by RGA2, a gene isolated from a TR4-resistant diploid banana, or by the nematode-derived Ced9. This may be achieved by genetic modification.

=== Black sigatoka ===
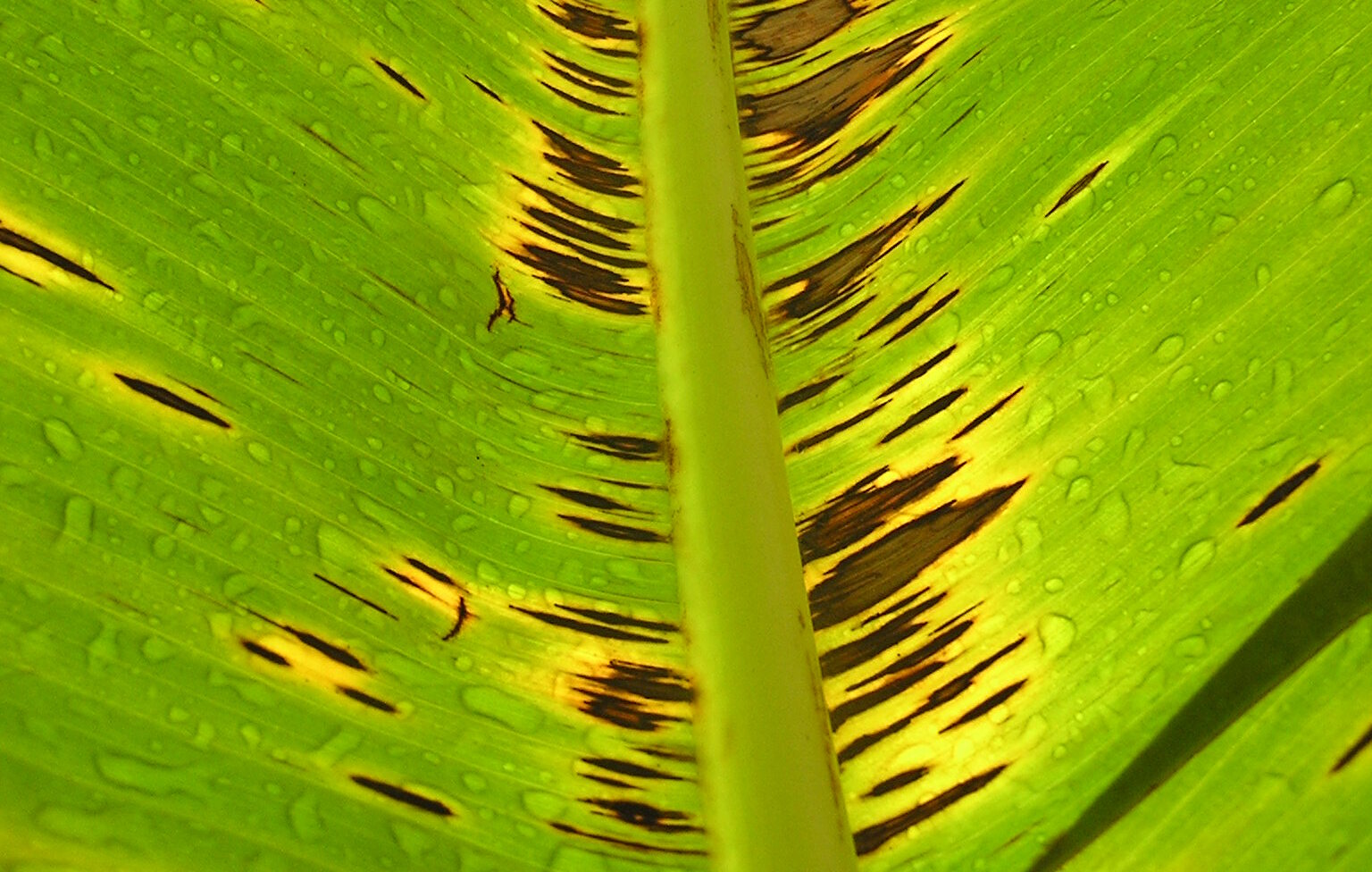
Leaf infected with black sigatoka

Black sigatoka is a fungal leaf spot disease first observed in Fiji in 1963 or 1964. It is caused by the ascomycete Mycosphaerella fijiensis. The disease, also called black leaf streak, has spread to banana plantations throughout the tropics from infected banana leaves used as packing material. It affects all main cultivars of bananas and plantains (including the Cavendish cultivars), impeding photosynthesis by blackening parts of the leaves, eventually killing the entire leaf. Starved for energy, fruit production falls by 50% or more, and the bananas that do grow ripen prematurely, making them unsuitable for export. The fungus has shown ever-increasing resistance to treatment; spraying with fungicides may be required as often as 50 times a year. Better strategies, with integrated pest management, are needed.

=== Banana bunchy top virus ===
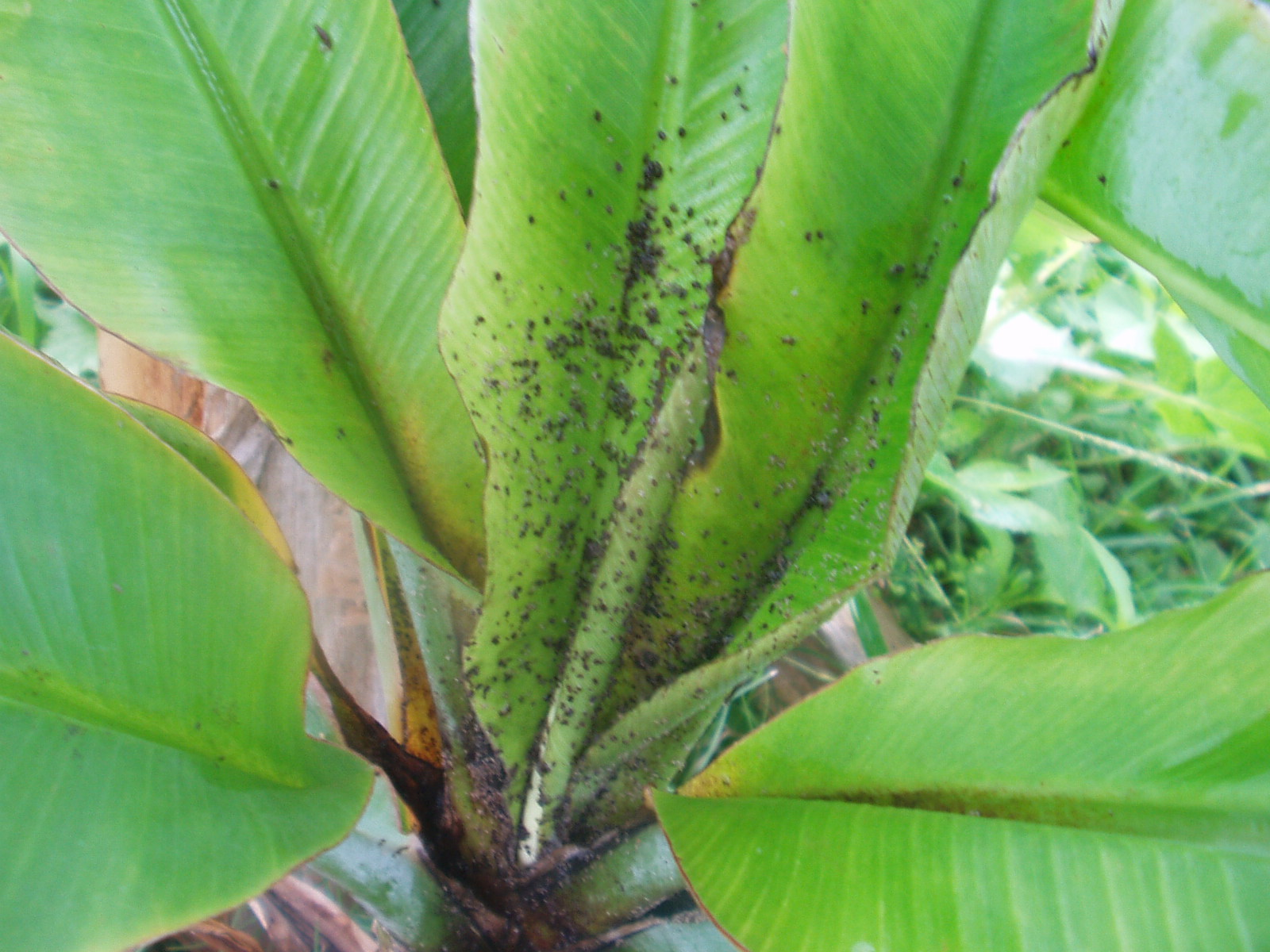
Colony of banana aphids (Pentalonia nigronervosa), vector of banana bunchy top virus

Banana bunchy top virus is a plant virus of the genus Babuvirus, family Nanonviridae affecting Musa spp. (including banana, abaca, plantain and ornamental bananas) and Ensete spp. in the family Musaceae. Banana bunchy top disease symptoms include dark green streaks of variable length in leaf veins, midribs and petioles. Leaves become short and stunted as the disease progresses, becoming 'bunched' at the apex of the plant. Infected plants may produce no fruit or the fruit bunch may not emerge from the pseudostem. The virus is transmitted by the banana aphid Pentalonia nigronervosa and is widespread in Southeast Asia, Asia, the Philippines, Taiwan, Oceania and parts of Africa. There is no cure, but it can be effectively controlled by the eradication of diseased plants and the use of virus-free planting material. No resistant cultivars have been found, but varietal differences in susceptibility have been reported. The commercially important Cavendish subgroup is severely affected.

=== Banana bacterial wilt ===
Banana bacterial wilt is a bacterial disease caused by Xanthomonas campestris pv. musacearum. First identified on a close relative of bananas, Ensete ventricosum, in Ethiopia in the 1960s, The disease was first seen in Uganda in 2001 affecting all banana cultivars. Since then it has been diagnosed in Central and East Africa, including the banana growing regions of Rwanda, the Democratic Republic of the Congo, Tanzania, Kenya, Burundi, and Uganda.

== Conservation of genetic diversity ==
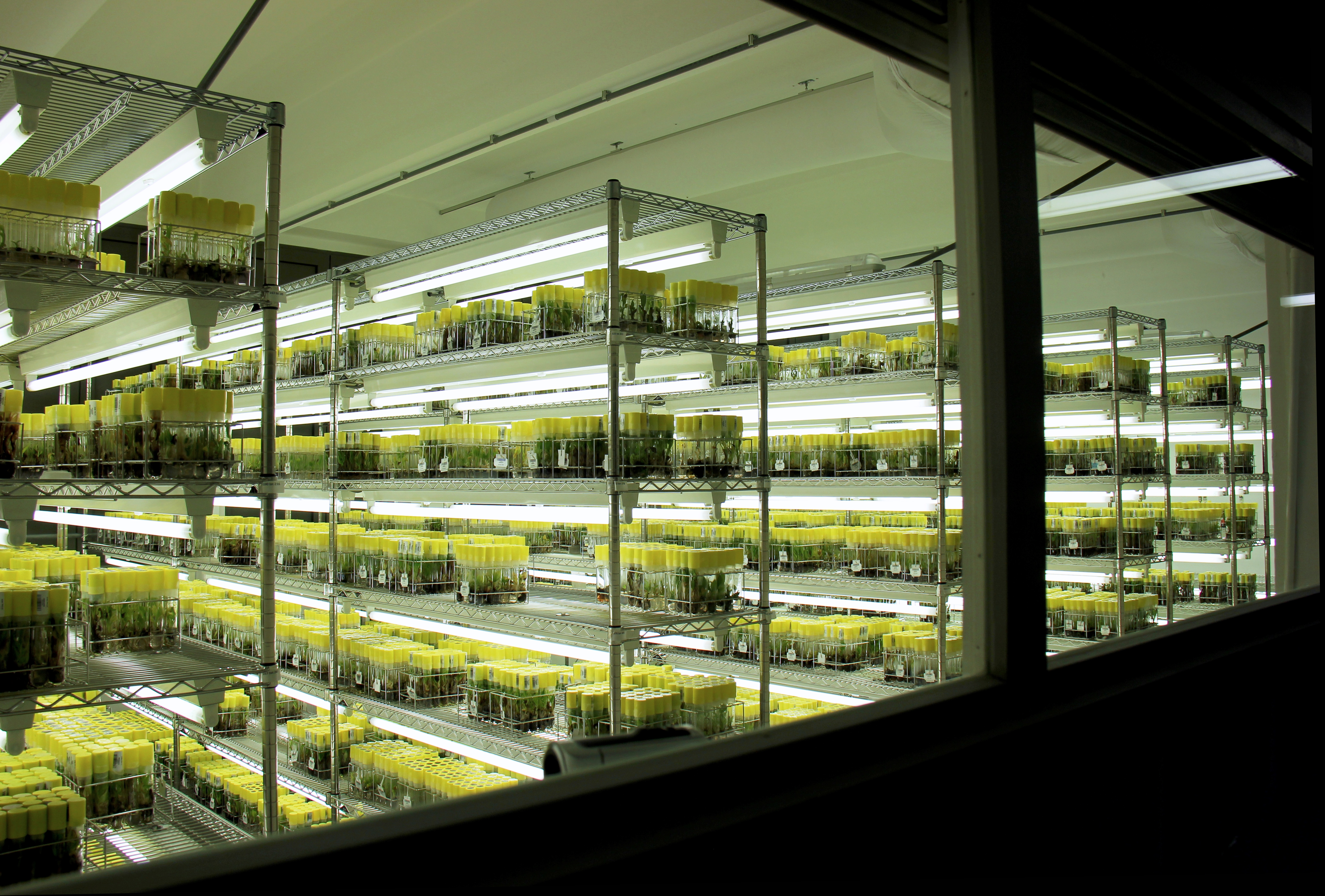
The cold storage room for the banana collection at Bioversity International's Musa Germplasm Transit Centre

Given the narrow range of genetic diversity present in bananas and the many threats via biotic (pests and diseases) and abiotic threats (such as drought) stress, conservation of the full spectrum of banana genetic resources is ongoing. In 2024, the economist Pascal Liu of the FAO described the impact of global warming as an "enormous threat" to the world supply of bananas.

Banana germplasm is conserved in many national and regional gene banks, and at the world's largest banana collection, the International Musa Germplasm Transit Centre, managed by Bioversity International and hosted at KU Leuven in Belgium. Since Musa cultivars are mostly seedless, they are conserved by three main methods: in vivo (planted in field collections), in vitro (as plantlets in test tubes within a controlled environment), and by cryopreservation (meristems conserved in liquid nitrogen at −196 °C).

Genes from wild banana species are conserved as DNA and as cryopreserved pollen. Seeds from wild species are sometimes conserved, although less commonly, as they are difficult to regenerate. In addition, bananas and their crop wild relatives are conserved in situ, in the wild natural habitats where they evolved and continue to do so. Diversity is also conserved in farmers' fields where continuous cultivation, adaptation and improvement of cultivars is often carried out by small-scale farmers growing traditional local cultivars.

== Nutrition ==
Bananas, raw (Daily Value)
Nutritional value per 100 g (3.5 oz)
- Energy: 371 kJ (89 kcal)
- Carbohydrates: 22.84 g
- Sugars: 12.23 g
- Dietary fiber: 2.6 g
- Fat: 0.33 g
- Protein: 1.09 g
Vitamins and minerals
Vitamins	Quantity %DV^{†}
Vitamin A equiv.	2% 19.2 μg
Thiamine (B1)	3% 0.031 mg
Riboflavin (B2)	6% 0.073 mg
Niacin (B3)	4% 0.665 mg
Pantothenic acid (B5)	7% 0.334 mg
Vitamin B6	24% 0.4 mg
Folate (B9)	5% 20 μg
Choline	2% 9.8 mg
Vitamin C	10% 8.7 mg
Minerals	Quantity %DV^{†}
Copper	11% 0.101 mg
Iron	1% 0.26 mg
Magnesium	6% 27 mg
Manganese	12% 0.27 mg
Phosphorus	2% 22 mg
Potassium	12% 358 mg
Sodium	0% 1 mg
Zinc	1% 0.15 mg
- Other constituents: Quantity
- Water: 74.91 g
- Full Link to USDA Database entry values are for edible portion
- ^{†}Percentages estimated using US recommendations for adults, except for potassium, which is estimated based on expert recommendation from the National Academies.

A raw banana (not including the peel) is 75% water, 23% carbohydrates, 1% protein, and contains negligible fat. A reference amount of 100 grams (3.5 oz) supplies 89 calories, 24% of the Daily Value of vitamin B_{6}, and moderate amounts of vitamin C, manganese, potassium, and dietary fiber, with no other micronutrients in significant content (table).

Although bananas are commonly thought to contain exceptional potassium content, their actual potassium content is not high per typical food serving, having only 12% of the Daily Value for potassium (table). The potassium-content ranking for bananas among fruits, vegetables, legumes, and many other foods is medium.

== Uses ==
=== Culinary ===
==== Fruit ====
Bananas are a staple starch for many tropical populations. Depending upon cultivar and ripeness, the flesh can vary in taste from starchy to sweet, and texture from firm to mushy. Both the skin and inner part can be eaten raw or cooked. The primary component of the aroma of fresh bananas is isoamyl acetate (also known as banana oil), which, along with several other compounds such as butyl acetate and isobutyl acetate, is a significant contributor to banana flavor.

Plantains are eaten cooked, often as fritters. Pisang goreng, bananas fried with batter, is a popular street food in Southeast Asia. Bananas feature in Philippine cuisine, with desserts like maruya banana fritters. Bananas can be made into fruit preserves. Banana chips are a snack produced from sliced and fried bananas, such as in Kerala. Dried bananas are ground to make banana flour. In Africa, matoke bananas are cooked in a sauce with meat and vegetables such as peanuts or beans to make the breakfast dish katogo. In Western countries, bananas are used to make desserts such as banana bread.

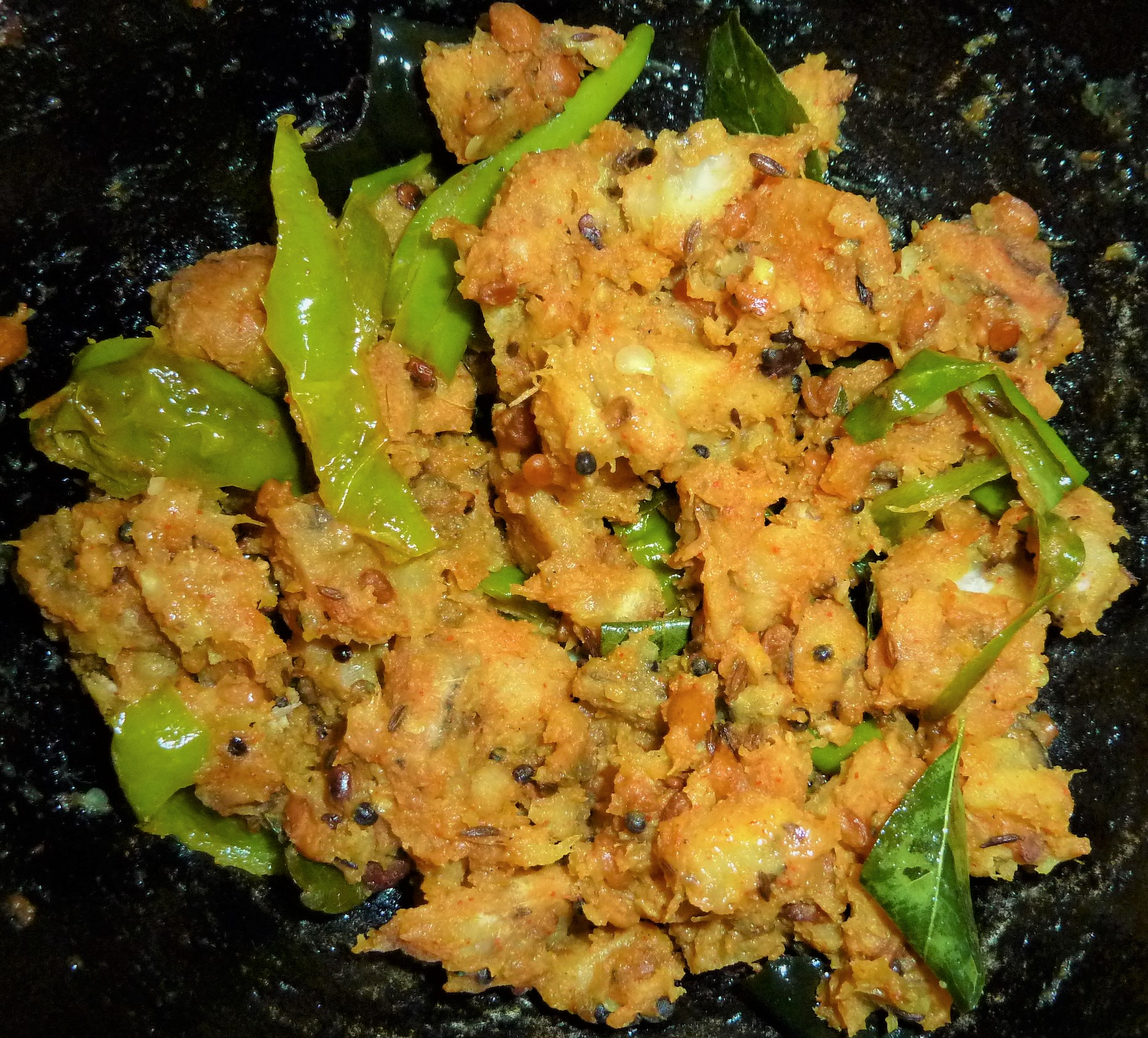
Banana curry with lemon, Andhra Pradesh, India

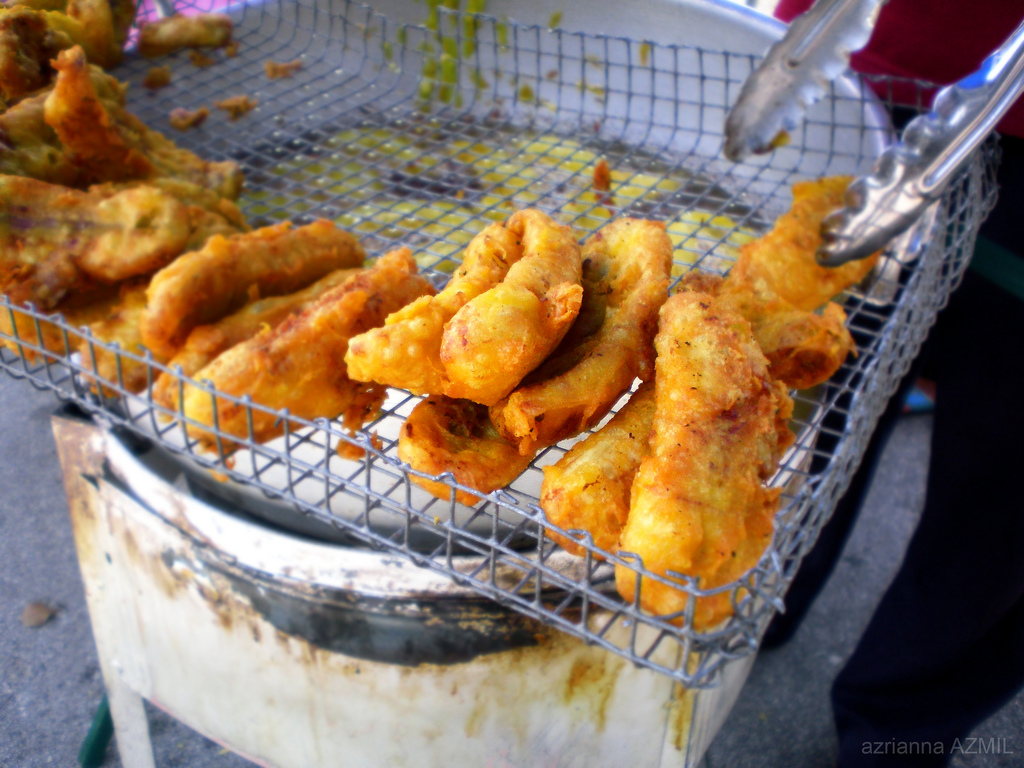
Pisang goreng fried banana in batter, a popular snack in Indonesia

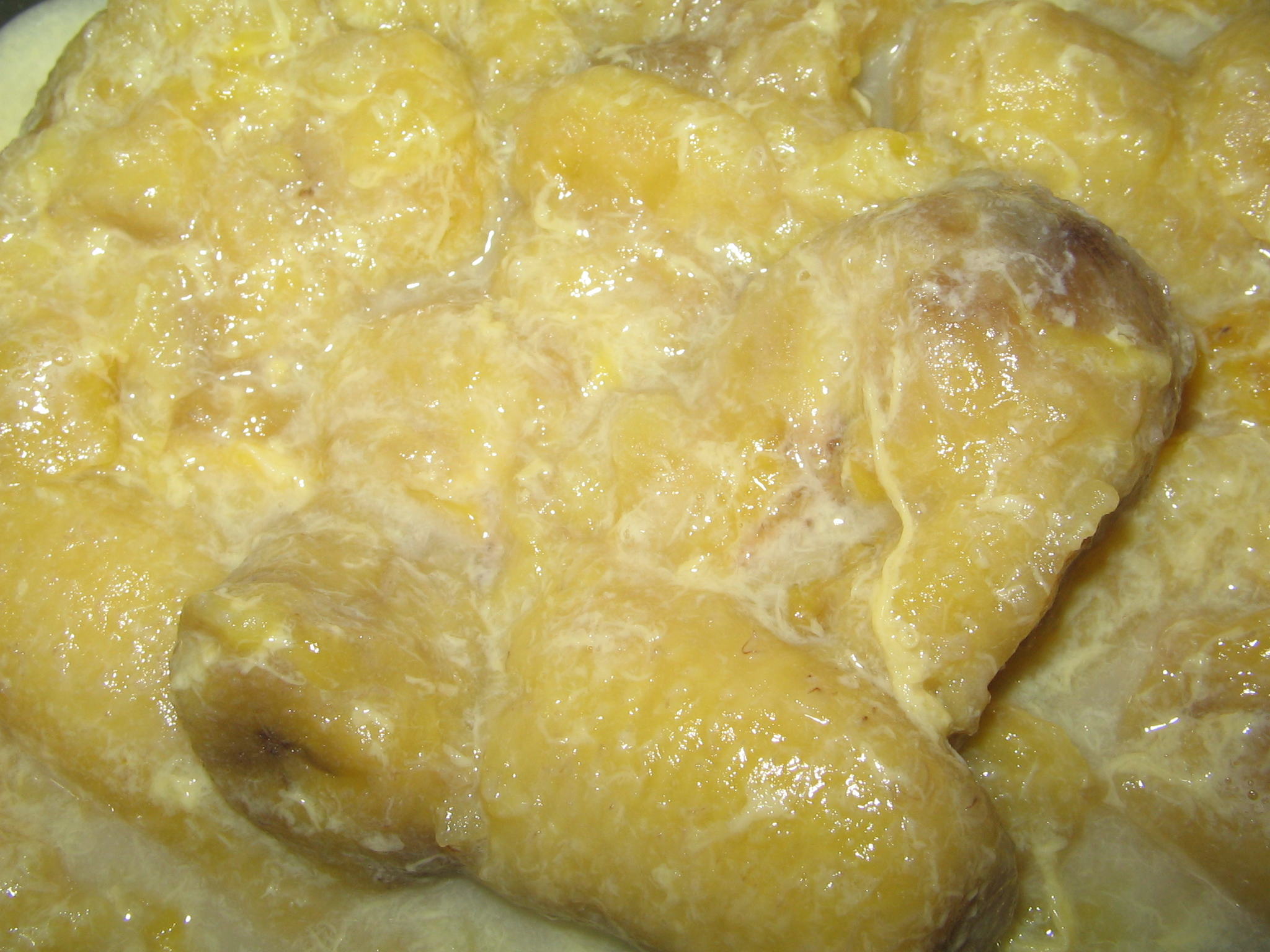
Banana in sweet gravy, known as pengat pisang in Malaysia

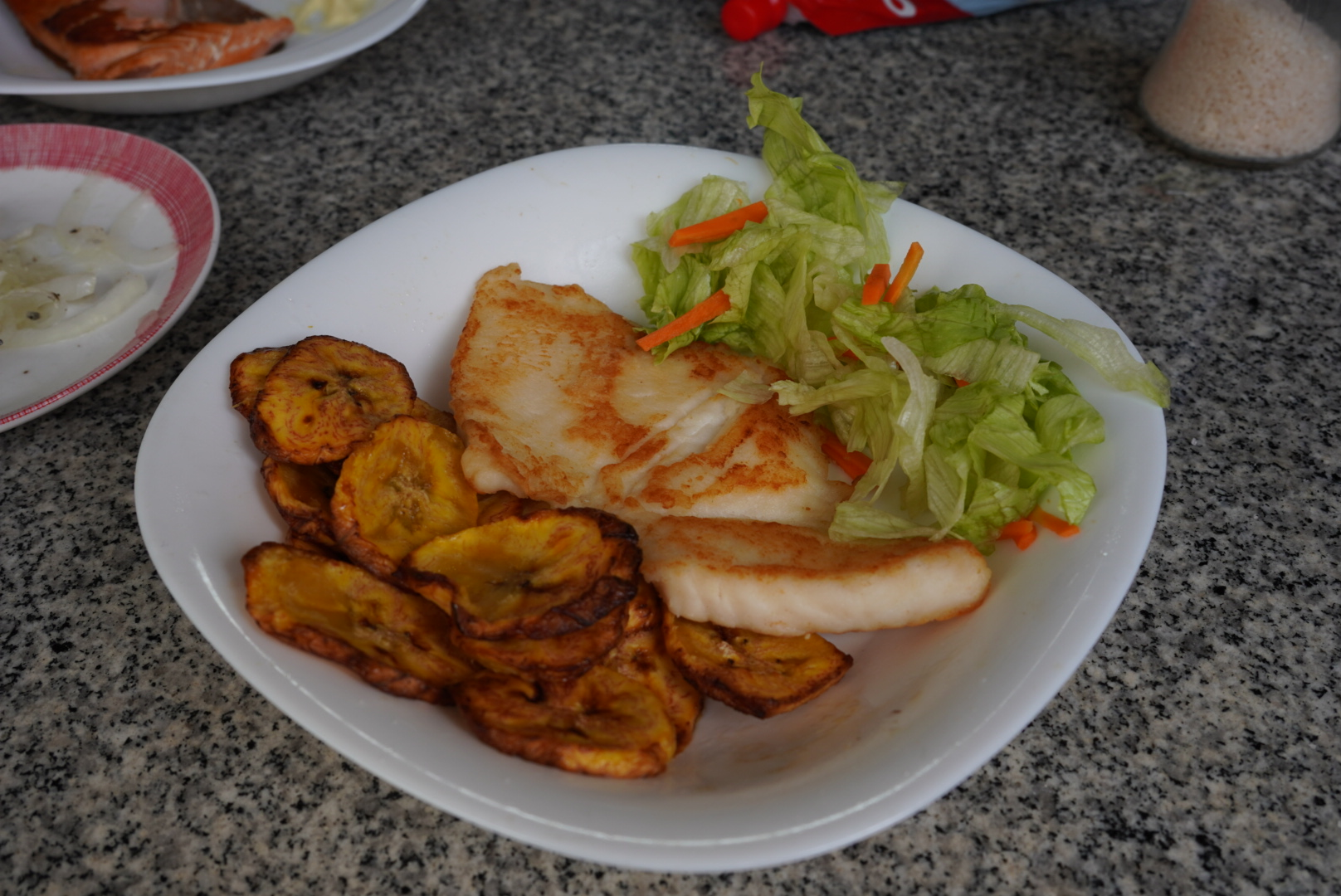
Fried bananas, served with lettuce, carrots and Arapaima.

==== Flowers ====
Banana flowers (also called "banana hearts" or "banana blossoms") are used as a vegetable in South Asian and Southeast Asian cuisine. The flavor resembles that of artichoke. As with artichokes, both the fleshy part of the bracts and the heart are edible.

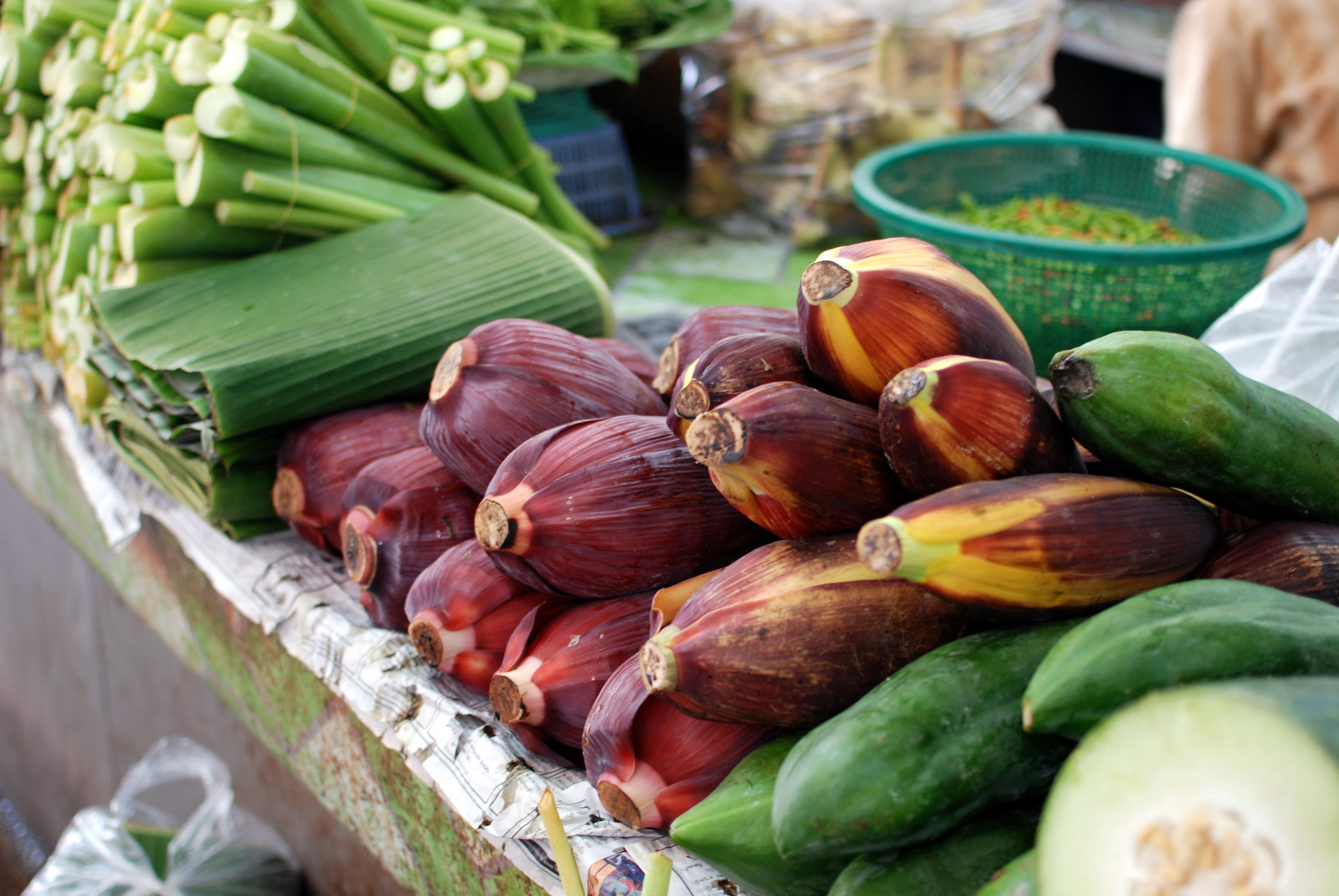
Banana flowers and leaves on sale in Thailand

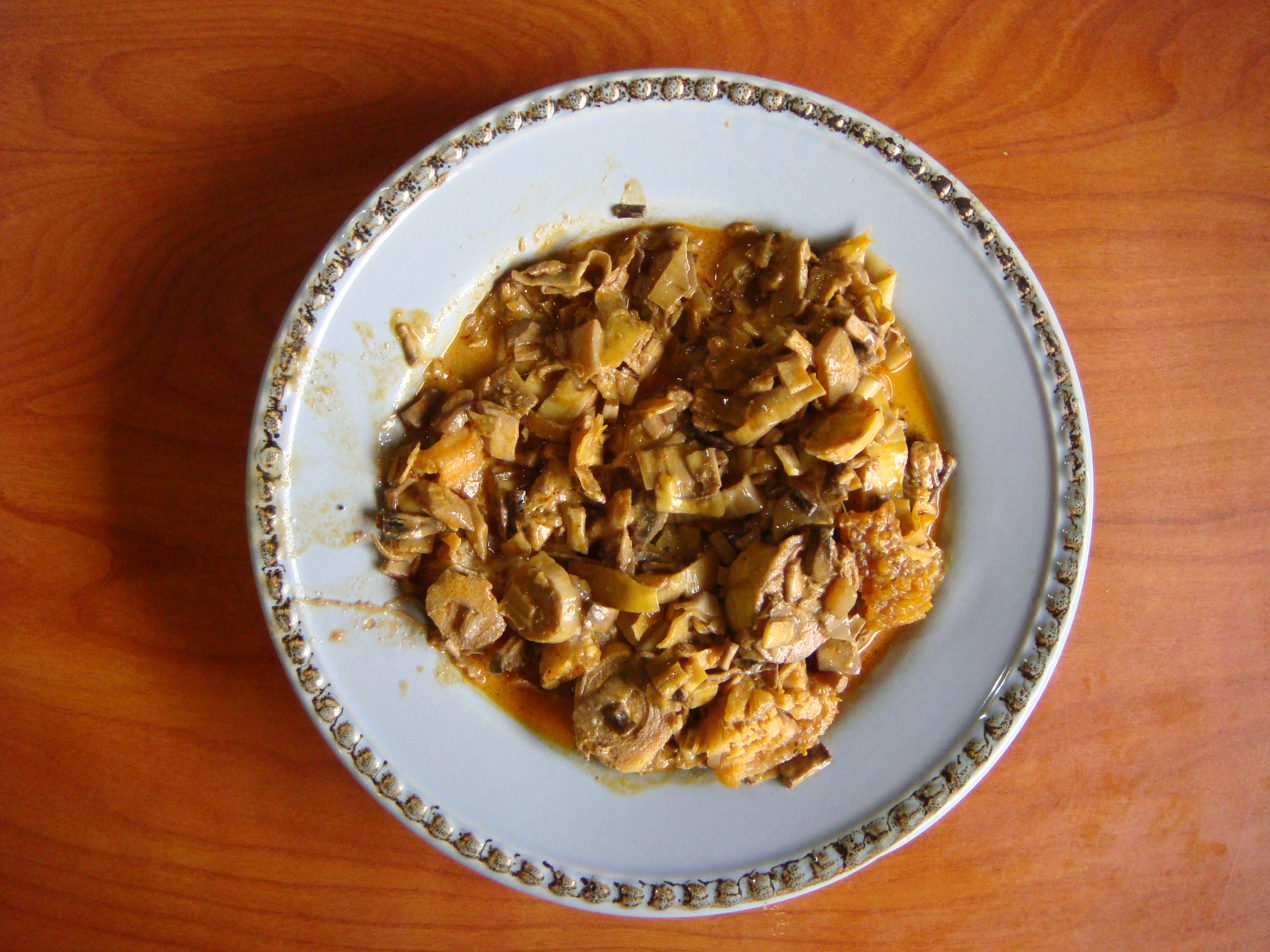
Kilawin na pusô ng saging, a Filipino dish of banana flowers

==== Leaf ====
Banana leaves are large, flexible, and waterproof. While generally too tough to actually be eaten, they are often used as ecologically friendly disposable food containers or as "plates" in South Asia and several Southeast Asian countries. In Indonesian cuisine, banana leaf is employed in cooking methods like pepes and botok; banana leaf packages containing food ingredients and spices are cooked in steam or in boiled water, or are grilled on charcoal. Certain types of tamales are wrapped in banana leaves instead of corn husks.

In Malaysia, banana leaves are traditionally used as a food wrap for nasi lemak. While banana leaves are not an essential ingredient, it imparts a subtle, vegetal aroma that enhances the flavor of the dish.

When banana leaves are used for steaming or grilling, they protect the food ingredients from burning and add a subtle sweet flavor. In South India, it is customary to serve traditional food on a banana leaf. In Tamil Nadu (India), dried banana leaves are used as to pack food and to make cups to hold liquid food items.

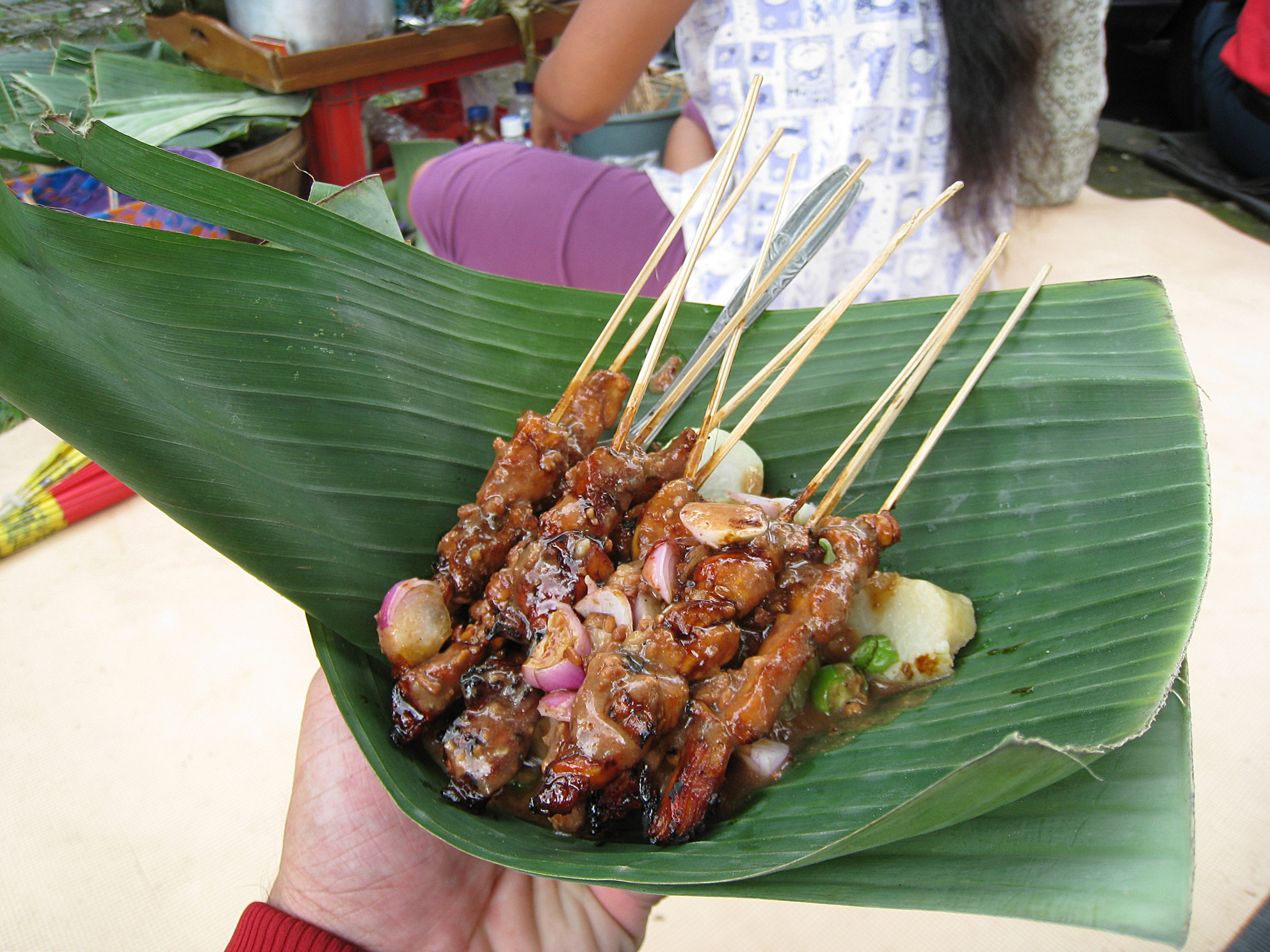
Banana leaf as disposable plate for chicken satay in Java

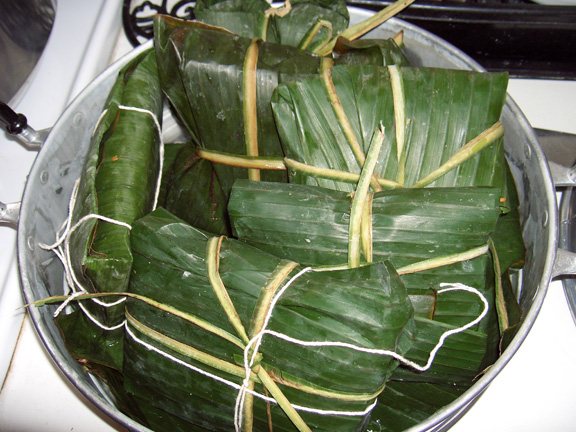
Nicaraguan Nacatamales, in banana leaves, ready to be steamed

==== Trunk ====
The tender core of the banana plant's trunk is also used in South Asian and Southeast Asian cuisine. Examples include the Burmese dish mohinga, and the Filipino dishes inubaran and kadyos, manok, kag ubad.

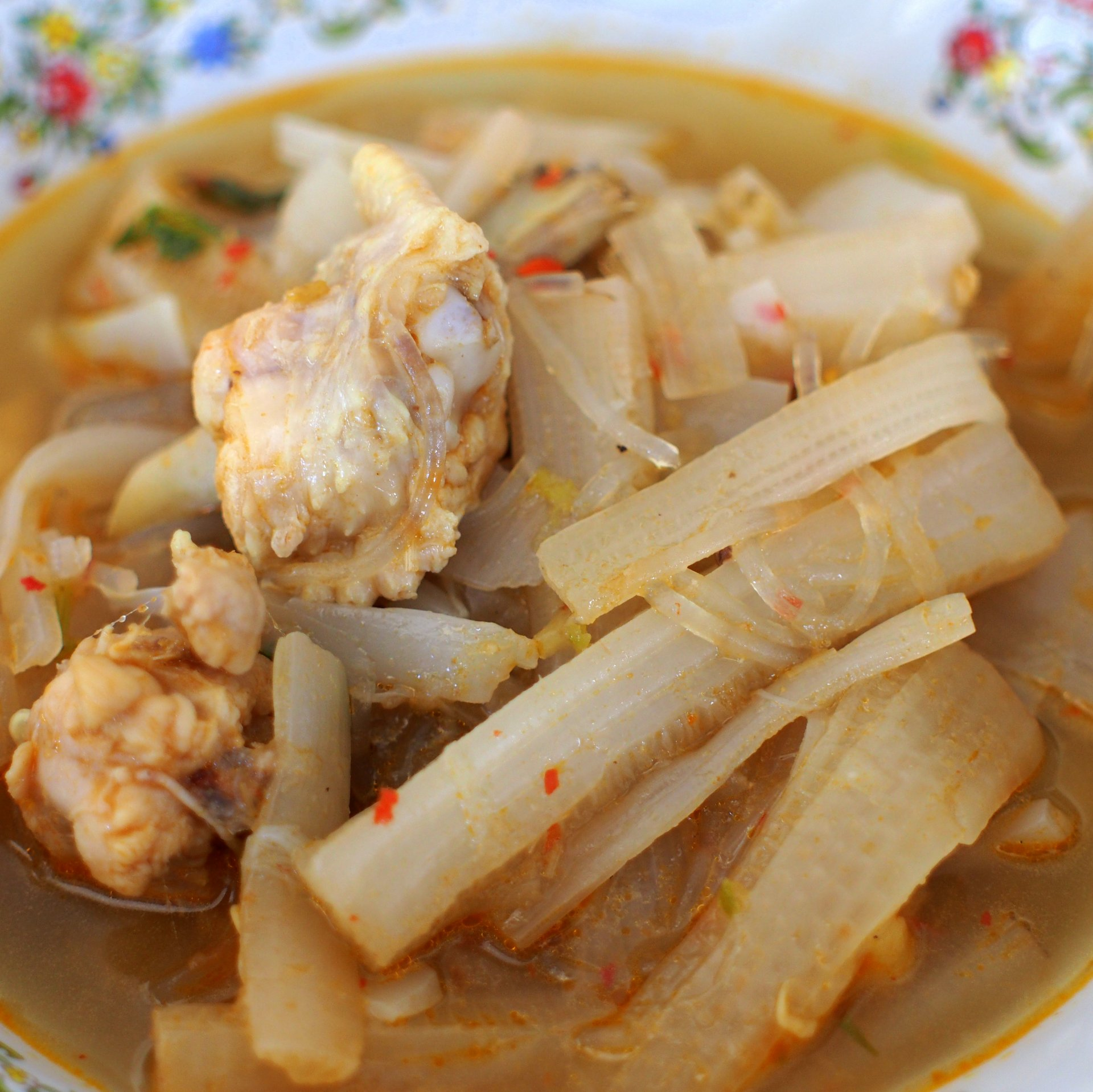
Kaeng yuak, a northern Thai curry of the core of the banana plant

=== Paper and textiles ===
Fiber harvested from the pseudostems and leaves of the abacá banana (Musa textilis) and other bananas have been used for textiles in the Philippines since ancient times. Archaeological evidence of cloth-weaving tools like spindle whorls date back to the period between 1000 BC and 500 AD in the Philippines. However, the tropical environment and the sparsity of pre-colonial records makes it hard to trace its antiquity. Nevertheless, abacá bananas are the main source of fibers for traditional textiles still woven among various ethnic groups of the Philippines. Examples of abacá-based textiles include the t'nalak, made by the Tiboli tribe of South Cotabato, and dagmay, made by the Bagobo people. Traditional abacá cloth collected from the Philippines during the Spanish colonial period is found in museum collections around the world, like the Boston Museum of Fine Arts and the Textile Museum of Canada.

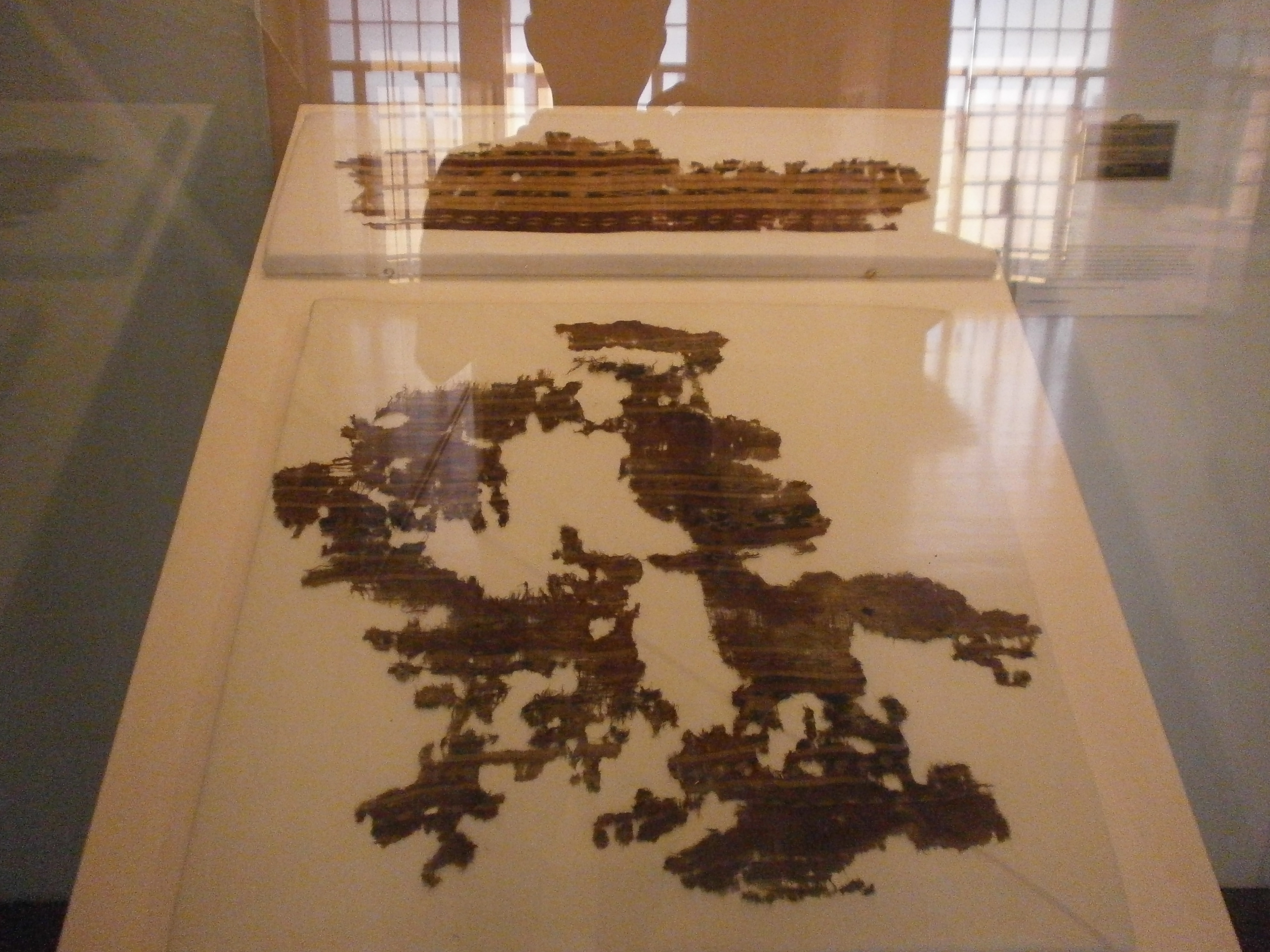
The Banton Burial Cloth (c. 1200–1300 AD) of the Philippines, the oldest surviving example of banana textile (and the oldest example of warp ikat weaving in Southeast Asia). It is made from abacá, a species of banana endemic to the Philippines.

The oldest surviving example of textile made from banana fibers is the Banton Burial Cloth recovered from a coffin in the sacred Ipot Cave of Banton, Romblon, Philippines, and dated to around the 13th and 14th centuries. Abacá textiles were also mentioned numerous times in Spanish colonial records in the Philippines since the 16th century, eventually acquiring the Philippine Spanish name medriñaque (entering the contemporary English language as "medrinacks", "medrianacks", "medrianackes", and "medrinacles", among other names) and the English name "Manila hemp". Aside from indigenous clothing for native Filipinos, medriñaque was also used during the colonial era as canvas for sails and for stiffening clothing like skirts, collars, and doublets. The inner fibers are also used in the making of hats, including the "Manila hats", hammocks, matting, cordage, ropes, coarse twines, and Manila paper. By the 19th century, abacá fiber had become one of the most important economic exports of the Philippines. They were in demand due to their strength and saltwater-resistance.

Outside the Philippines, abacá was first cultivated on a large scale in Sumatra in 1925 under the Dutch, who had observed its cultivation in the Philippines for cordage since the nineteenth century, followed up by plantings in Central America in 1929 sponsored by the U.S. Department of Agriculture. It also was transplanted into India and Guam.

A similar tradition of weaving banana textiles (from Musa basjoo and Musa balbisiana) also existed among the non-Han minority groups in southern China since at least the Han Dynasty (202 BC – 220 BC). Both fruit-bearing and fibrous banana species have been used. This textile tradition along with the banana species Musa basjoo (Japanese bashō, 芭蕉) was introduced to the Ryukyu Islands of Japan at around the 14th century. In the Japanese system of kijōka-bashōfu, leaves and shoots are cut from the plant periodically to ensure softness. Harvested shoots are first boiled in lye to prepare fibers for yarn-making. These banana shoots produce fibers of varying degrees of softness, yielding yarns and textiles with differing qualities for specific uses. For example, the outermost fibers of the shoots are the coarsest, and are suitable for tablecloths, while the softest innermost fibers are desirable for kimono and kamishimo. This traditional Japanese cloth-making process requires many steps, all performed by hand. Banana paper can be made either from the bark of the banana plant, mainly for artistic purposes, or from the fibers of the stem and non-usable fruits. The paper may be hand-made or industrially processed.

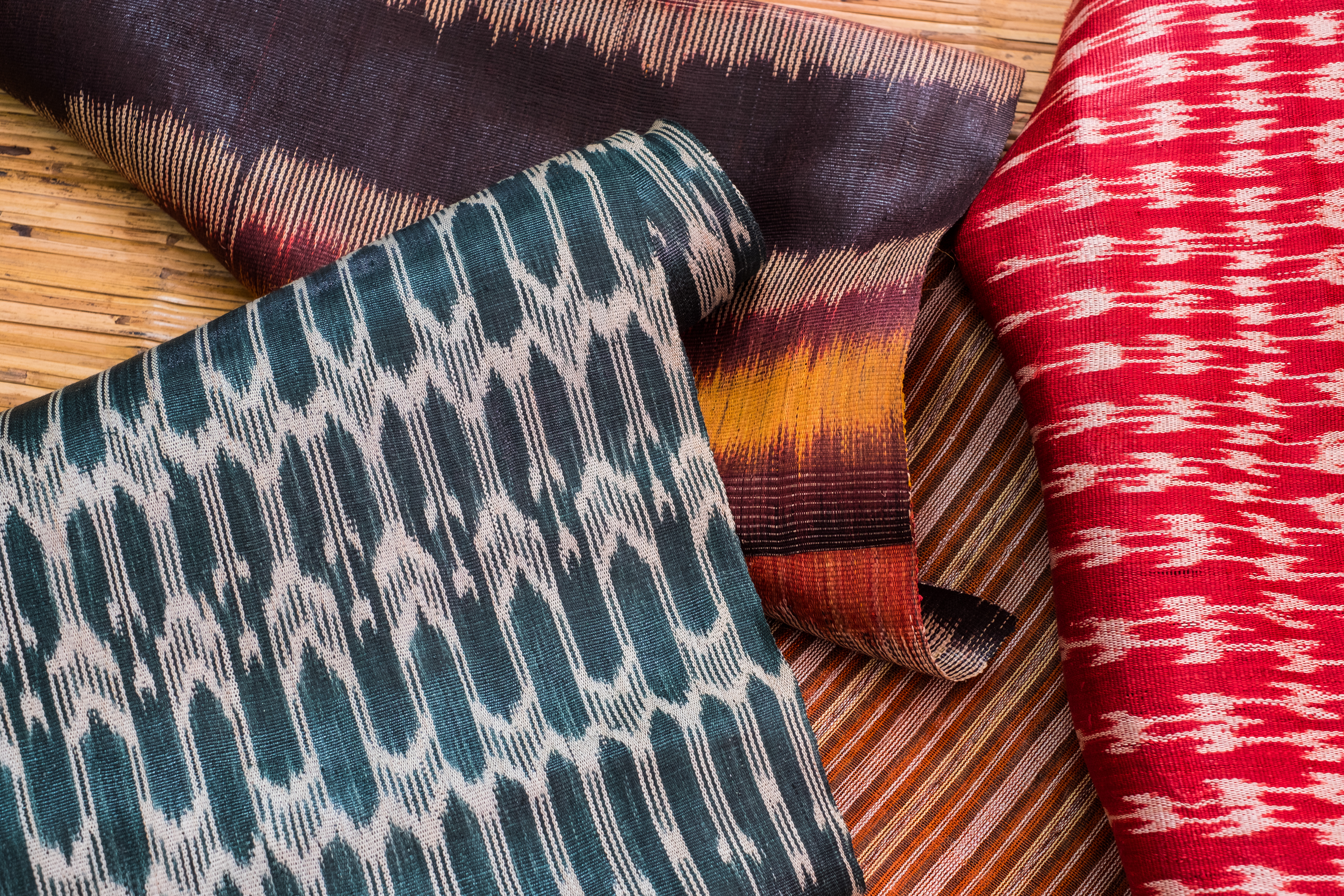
T'nalak cloth of the T'boli dreamweavers, one of the many types of traditional abacá cloths in the Philippines

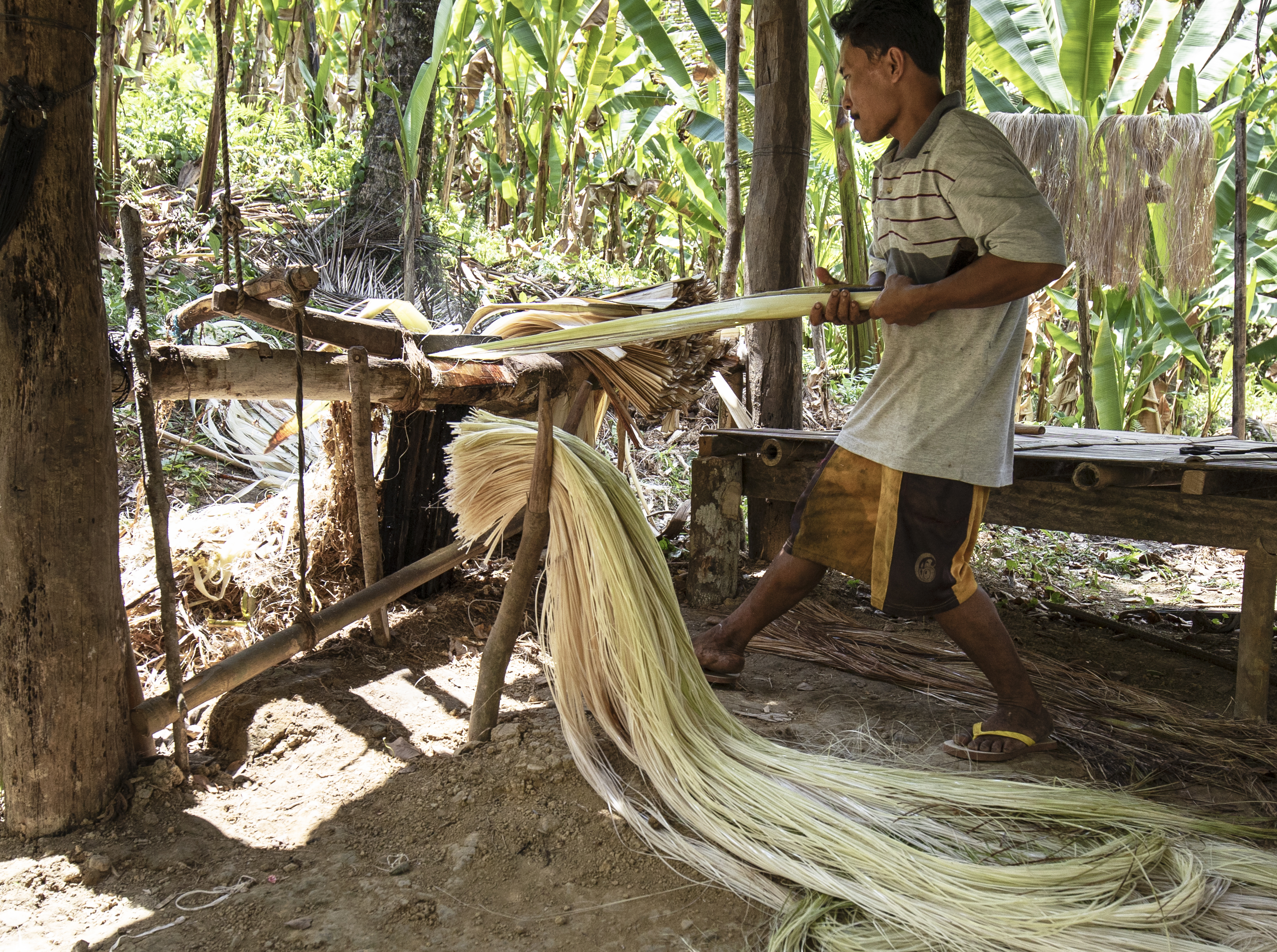
Abacá fibers being stripped using traditional methods in the Philippines

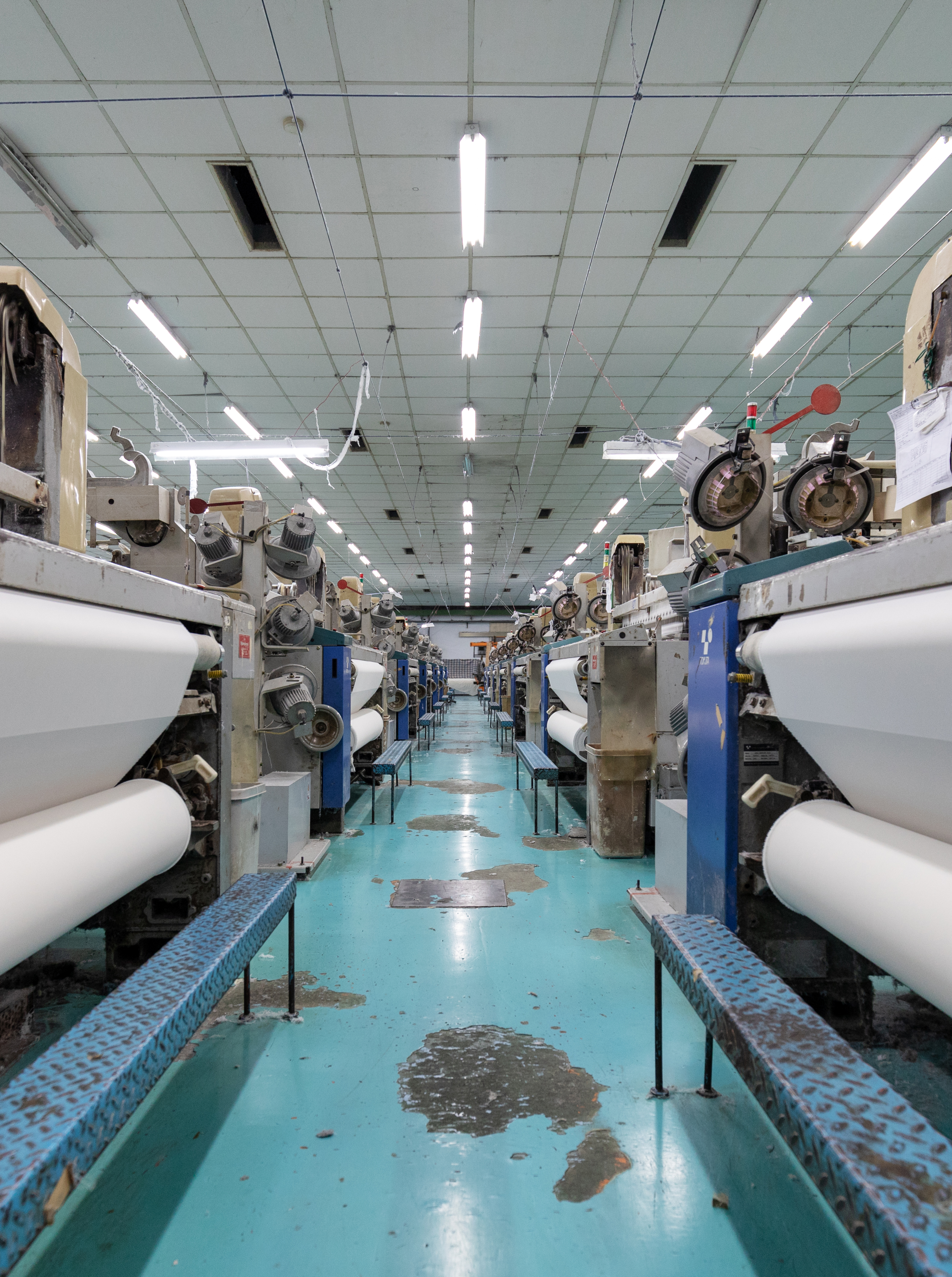
Weaving looms processing Manila hemp fabric

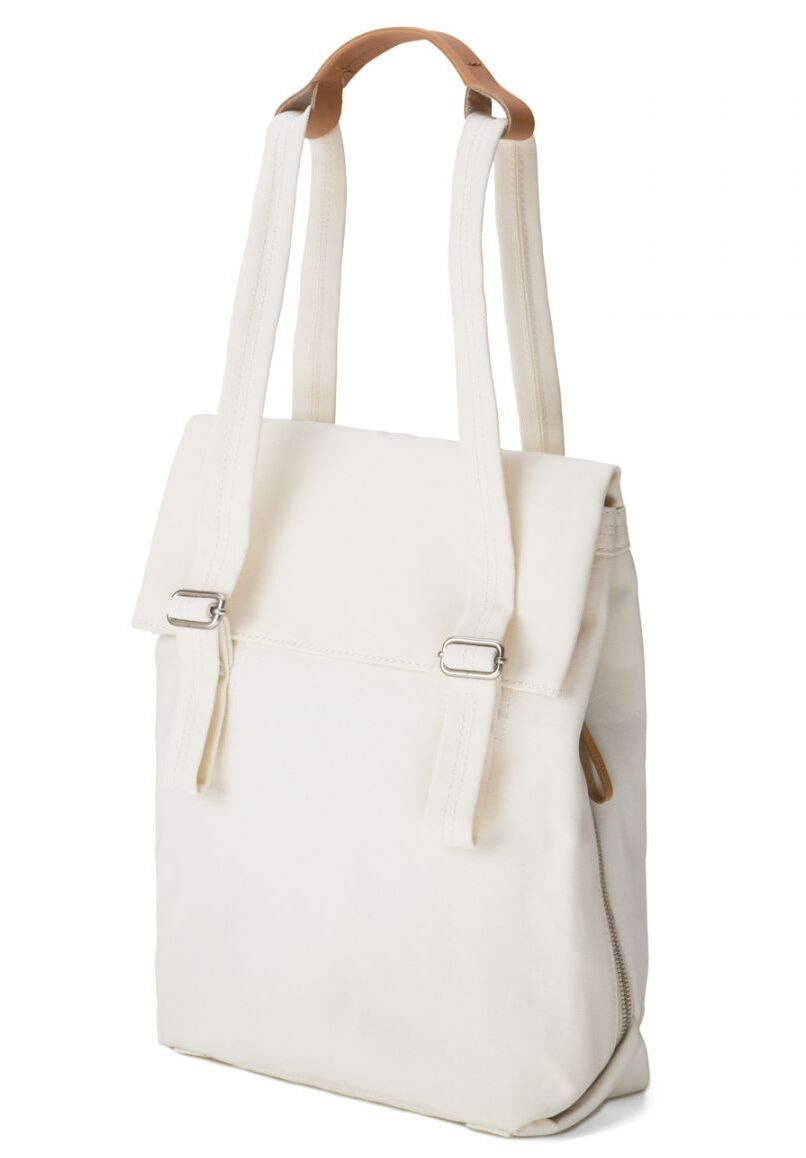
A modern Manila hemp bag

=== Other uses ===
The large leaves of bananas are locally used as umbrellas. Banana peel may have capability to extract heavy metal contamination from river water, similar to other purification materials. Waste bananas can be used to feed livestock. As with all living things, potassium-containing bananas emit radioactivity at low levels occurring naturally from the potassium-40 (K-40) isotope. The banana equivalent dose of radiation was developed in 1995 as a simple teaching-tool to educate the public about the natural, small amount of K-40 radiation occurring in everyone and in common foods.

=== Potential allergic reaction ===
Individuals with a latex allergy may experience a reaction to handling or eating bananas.

== Cultural roles ==
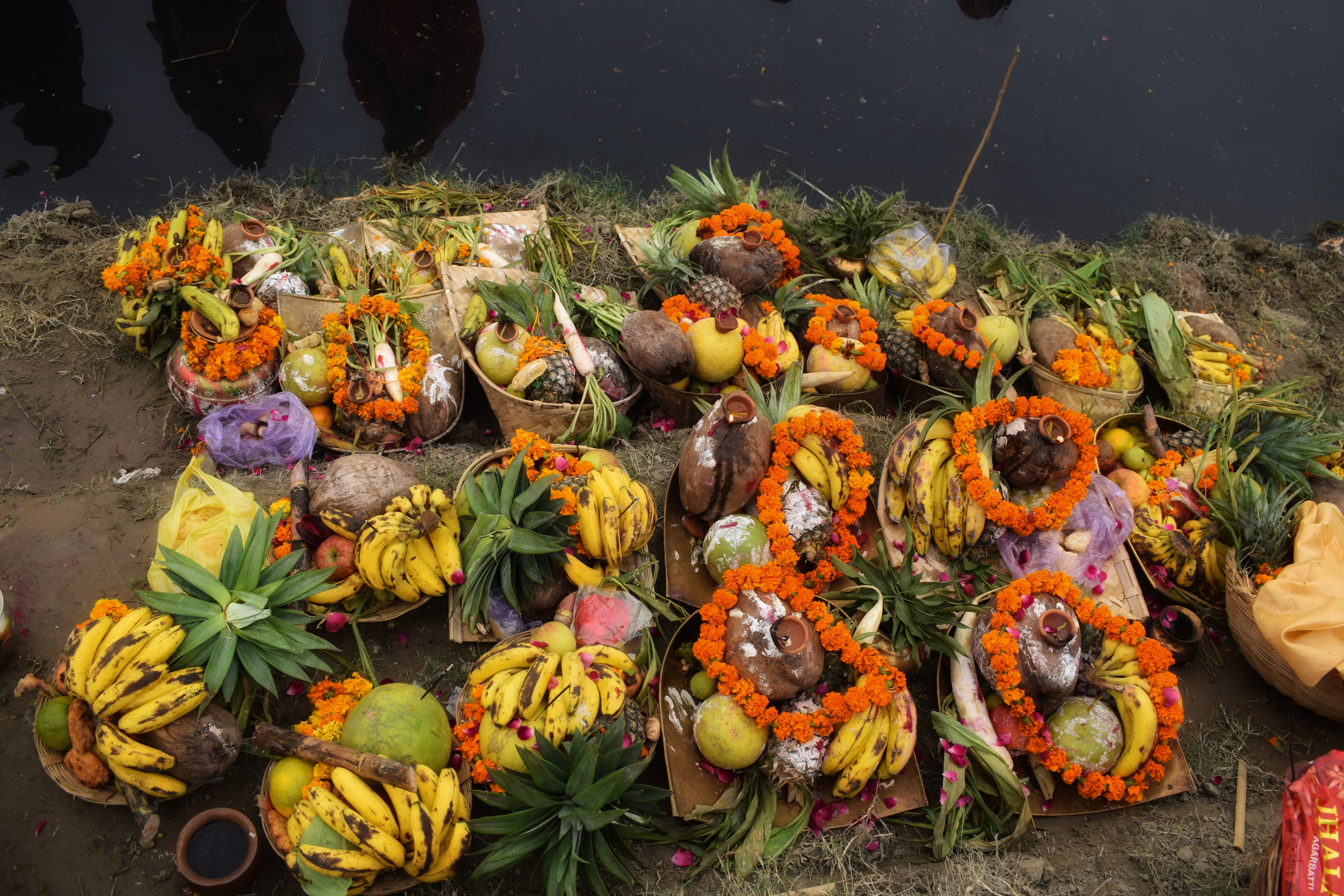
Bananas used in puja in the Hindu festival of Chhath in Northern India

=== Arts ===
The Edo period poet Matsuo Bashō is named after the Japanese word 芭蕉 (Bashō) for the Japanese banana. The Bashō planted in his garden by a grateful student became a source of inspiration to his poetry, as well as a symbol of his life and home.

The song "Yes! We Have No Bananas" was written by Frank Silver and Irving Cohn and originally released in 1923; for many decades, it was the best-selling sheet music in history. Since then the song has been rerecorded several times and has been particularly popular during banana shortages.

A person slipping on a banana peel has been a staple of physical comedy for generations. An American comedy recording from 1910 features a popular character of the time, "Uncle Josh", claiming to describe his own such incident. The banana's suggestively phallic shape has been exploited in artworks from Giorgio de Chirico's 1913 painting The Uncertainty of the Poet onwards. In 2019, an exhibition of Natalia LL's video and set of photographs showing a woman "sucking on a banana" at the National Museum in Warsaw was taken down and the museum's director reprimanded.

The cover artwork for the 1967 debut album of The Velvet Underground features a banana made by Andy Warhol. On the original vinyl LP version, the design allowed the listener to "peel" this banana to find a pink, peeled banana on the inside. In 1989, the feminist Guerilla Girls made a screenprint with two bananas, intentionally reminiscent of Warhol's, arranged to form a "0" to answer the question in the artwork, "How many works by women artists were in the Andy Warhol and Tremaine auctions at Sotheby's?".

Italian artist Maurizio Cattelan created a 2019 concept art piece titled Comedian involving taping a banana to a wall using silver duct tape. The piece was exhibited briefly at the Art Basel in Miami before being removed from the exhibition and eaten without permission in another artistic stunt titled Hungry Artist by New York artist David Datuna.

=== Religion and folklore ===
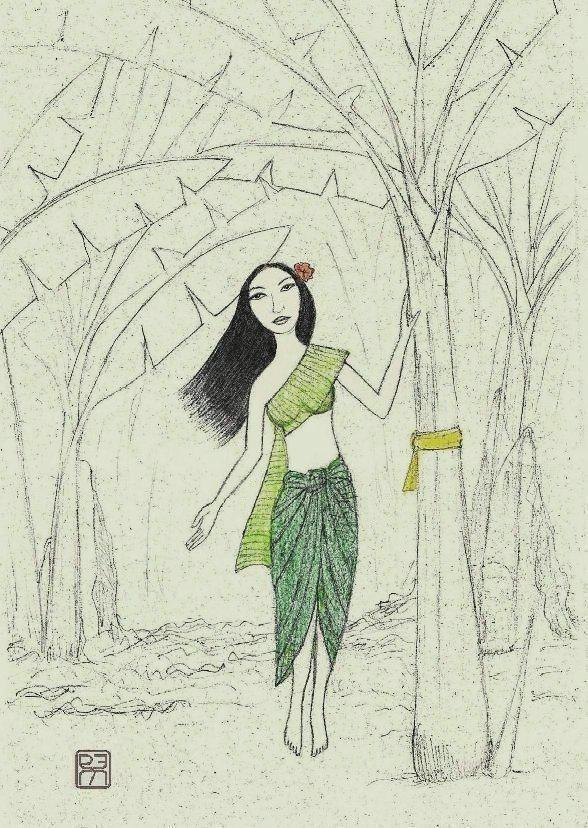
Nang Tani, the female ghost of Thai folklore that haunts banana plants

In India, bananas serve a prominent part in many festivals and occasions of Hindus. In South Indian weddings, particularly Tamil weddings, banana trees are tied in pairs to form an arch as a blessing to the couple for a long-lasting, useful life.

In Thailand, it is believed that a certain type of banana plant may be inhabited by a spirit, Nang Tani, a type of ghost related to trees and similar plants that manifests itself as a young woman. People often tie a length of colored satin cloth around the pseudostem of the banana plants.

In Malay folklore, the ghost known as Pontianak is associated with banana plants (pokok pisang), and its spirit is said to reside in them during the day.

=== Racial signifier ===
In European, British, and Australian sport, throwing a banana at a member of an opposing team has long been used as a form of racial abuse. The act, which was commonplace in England in the 1980s, is meant to taunt players of Black African ancestry by equating them to apes or monkeys.

== See also ==
- Corporación Bananera Nacional
- Domesticated plants and animals of Austronesia
- Orange, another fruit exported and consumed in large quantities
- United Brands Company v Commission of the European Communities
- Banana republic

== Bibliography ==
- de Langhe, Edmond; de Maret, Pierre (2004). "Tracking the banana: its significance in early agriculture". In Hather, Jon G. (ed.). The Prehistory of Food: Appetites for Change. Routledge. p. 372. ISBN 978-0-203-20338-5. Archived from the original on February 22, 2017.
- Nelson, S. C.; Ploetz, R. C.; Kepler, A. K. (2006). "Musa species (bananas and plantains)" (PDF). In Elevitch, C.R. (ed.). Species Profiles for Pacific Island Agroforestry. Hōlualoa, Hawaiʻi: Agroforestry Net, Inc. Archived (PDF) from the original on February 28, 2014.
- Office of the Gene Technology Regulator (2008). The Biology of Musa L. (banana) (PDF). Australian Government. Archived from the original (PDF) on December 3, 2012.
- Ploetz, R. C.; Kepler, A. K.; Daniells, J.; Nelson, S. C. (2007). "Banana and Plantain: An Overview with Emphasis on Pacific Island Cultivars" (PDF). In Elevitch, C. R. (ed.). Species Profiles for Pacific Island Agroforestry. Hōlualoa, Hawaiʻi: Permanent Agriculture Resources. Archived (PDF) from the original on January 1, 2016.
- Stover, R.H.; Simmonds, N.W. (1987). Bananas (3rd ed.). Harlow, England: Longman. ISBN 978-0-582-46357-8.
- Valmayor, Ramón V.; Jamaluddin, S. H.; Silayoi, B.; Kusumo, S.; Danh, L. D.; Pascua, O. C.; Espino, R. R. C. (2000). Banana cultivar names and synonyms in Southeast Asia (PDF). Los Baños, Philippines: International Network for Improvement of Banana and Plantain – Asia and the Pacific Office. ISBN 978-971-91751-2-4. Archived from the original (PDF) on May 30, 2013.
