= Rhino Horn banana =

Banana cultivar

Musa 'African Rhino Horn'
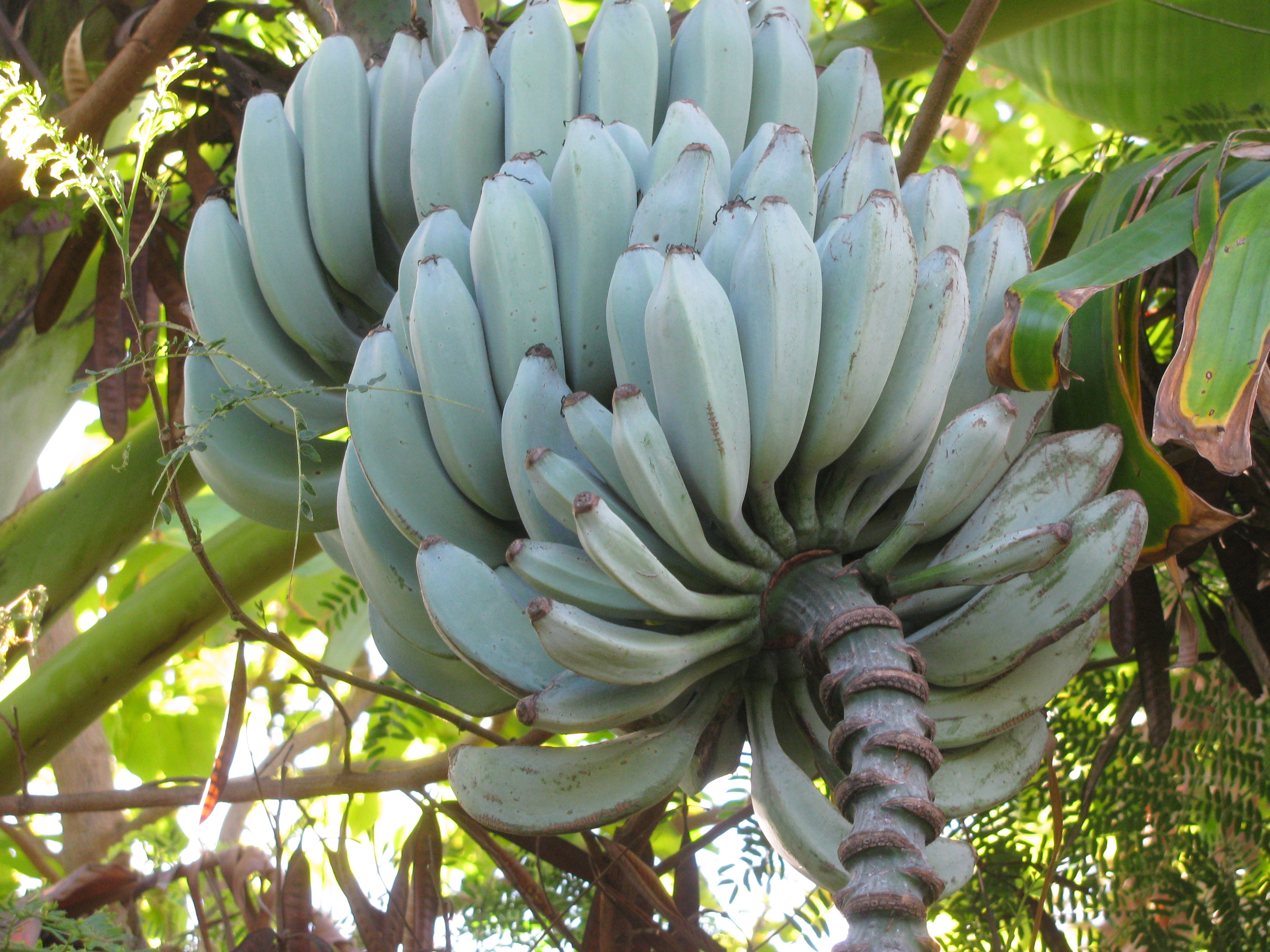
- Hybrid parentage: Musa acuminata × Musa balbisiana
- Cultivar group: AAB Group (Plantain Group)
- Cultivar: 'African Rhino Horn'
- Origin: Africa

Rhino Horn bananas, also called Rhino Horn plantains or African Rhino Horn, are hybrid banana cultivars from Africa. It produces strongly curved and elongated edible bananas which can grow to a length of two feet, the longest fruits among banana cultivars.

== Taxonomy ==
The Rhino Horn banana is a triploid (AAB Group, commonly known as Horn plantains) hybrid of the seeded banana Musa balbisiana and Musa acuminata.

Its official designation is Musa acuminata × balbisiana (AAB Group) 'African Rhino Horn'.

== Description ==
Rhino Horn banana plants can grow to a height of 12 to 20 feet. The pseudostem and leaves are dappled red.

Rhino Horn bananas have the longest fruits among banana cultivars, reaching up to 2 feet in length, though they normally only reach lengths of 12 to 14 inches. They produce two to four hands per bunch.

== Uses ==
Fruits of the Rhino Horn bananas can be eaten raw or cooked. They are also cultivated as ornamental plants for their attractive coloration.

== Pests and diseases ==
=== Common pests ===
- Borers (Cosmopolites sordidus)
- Grasshoppers
- Root Nematodes (Radopholus similis)

=== Common diseases ===
- Panama disease (Fusarium oxysporum f.sp. cubense)
- Black Sigatoka (Mycosphaerella fijiensis)

== See also ==
- Banana
- List of banana cultivars - Banana cultivar groups
- Musa
- Musa acuminata
- Musa balbisiana
- Plantain
