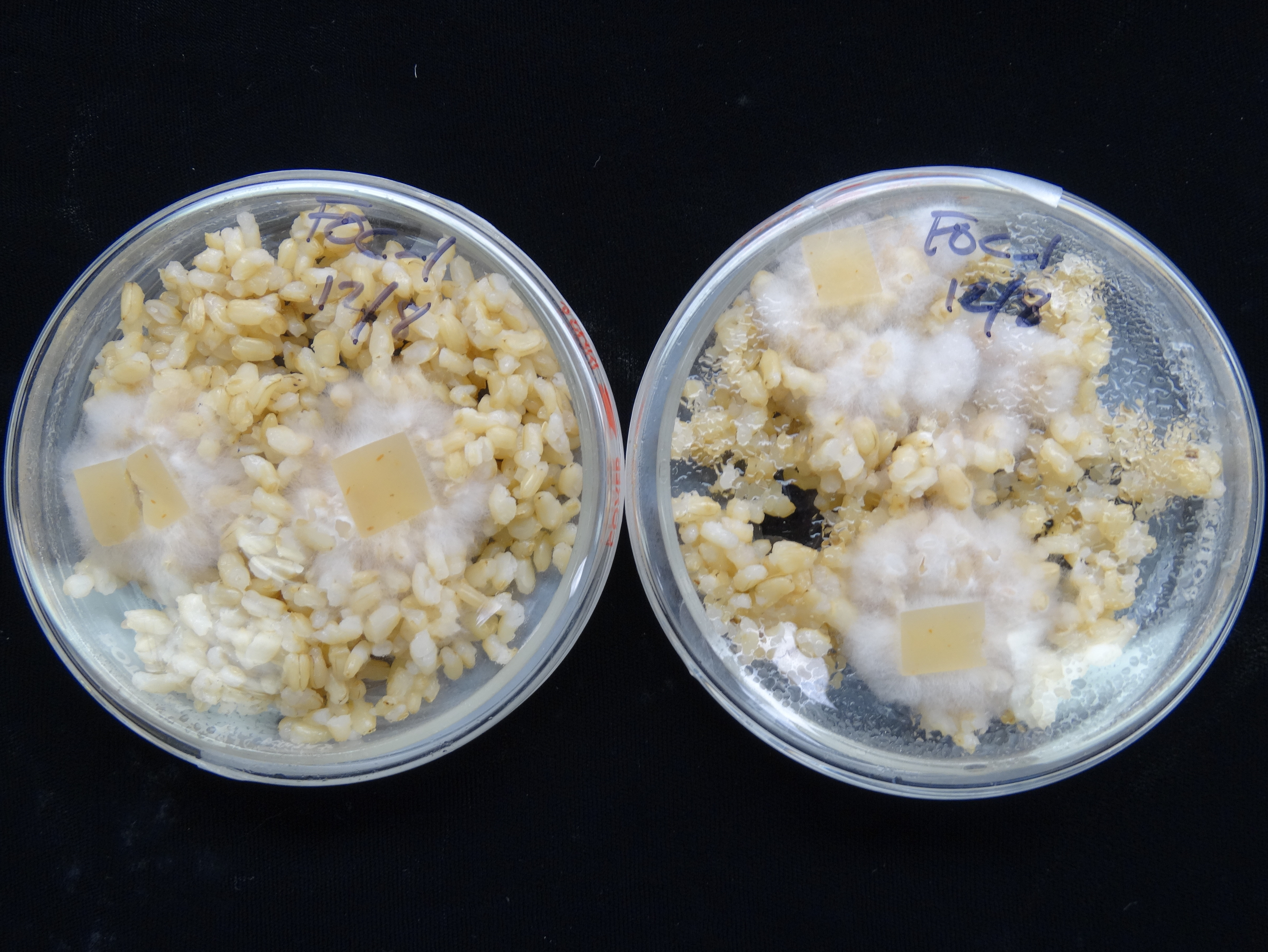
- Fusarium oxysporum f.sp. cubense race 1 growing for several days on brown rice

Scientific classification
- Kingdom: Fungi
- Division: Ascomycota
- Class: Sordariomycetes
- Order: Hypocreales
- Family: Nectriaceae
- Genus: Fusarium
- Species: F. oxysporum
- Forma specialis: F. o. f.sp. cubense

Trionomial name
- Fusarium oxysporum f.sp. cubense E.F.Sm., W.C.Snyder & H.N.Hansen (1940)

Synonyms
- Fusarium cubense E.F.Sm. (1910); Fusarium oxysporum var. cubense (E.F.Sm.) Wollenw. (1935); Fusarium oxysporum f. cubense (E.F.Sm.) W.C.Snyder & H.N.Hansen (1940)

= Fusarium oxysporum f.sp. cubense =

Fungus, causes banana wilt/Panama disease

Fusarium oxysporum f. sp. cubense is a fungal plant pathogen that causes Panama disease of banana (Musa spp.), also known as Fusarium wilt. The fungi and the related disease are responsible for widespread pressure on banana growing regions, destroying the economic viability of several commercially important banana varieties.

== Description ==
Fusarium oxysporum is a common inhabitant of soil and produces three types of asexual spores: macroconidia, microconidia and chlamydospores.

The macroconidia are nearly straight, slender and thin-walled. They usually have three or four septa, a foot-shaped basal cell and a curved and tapered apical cell. They are generally produced from phialides on conidiophores by basipetal division. They are important in secondary infection.

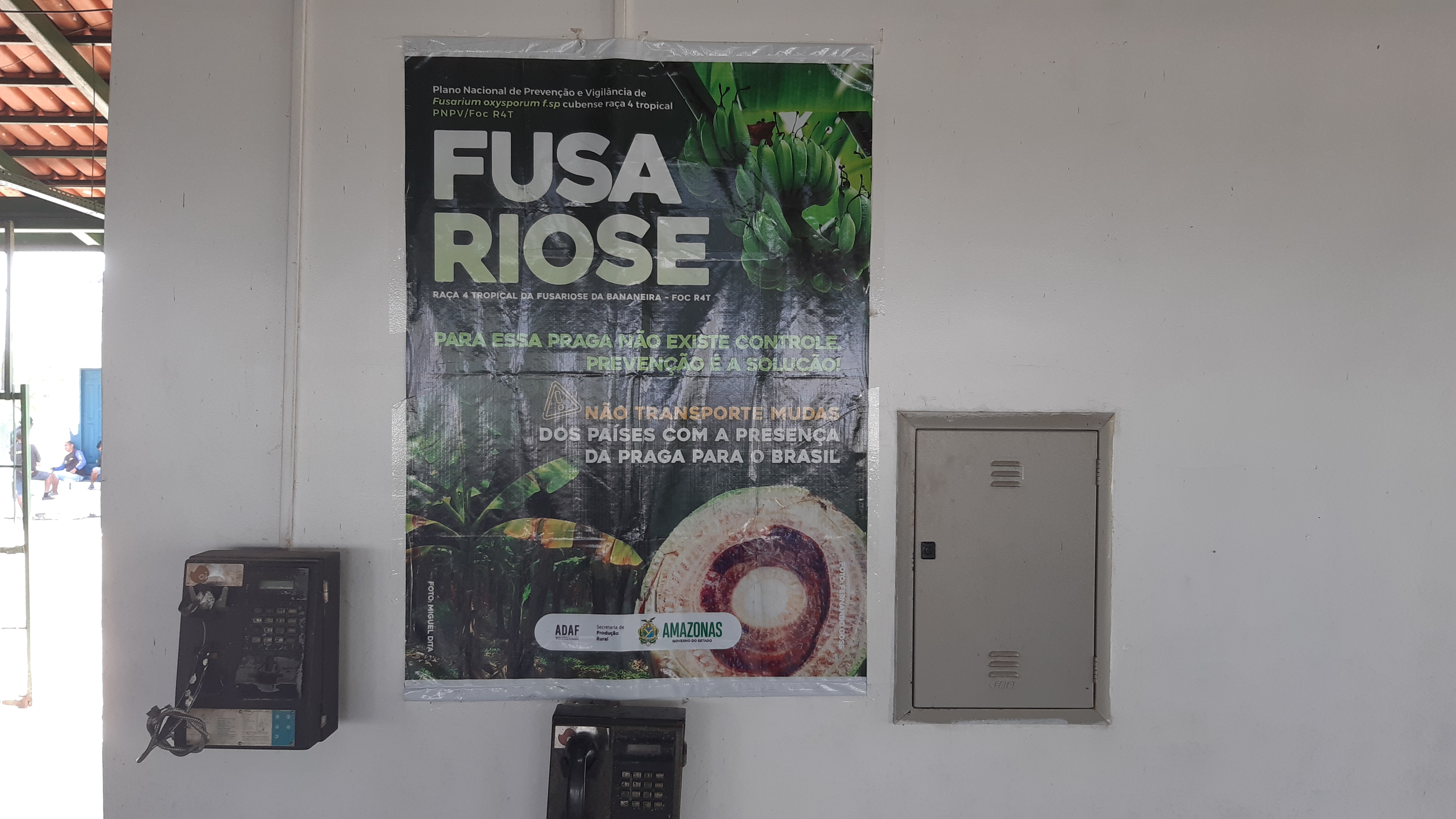
A warning sign at the port of Tabatinga, Brazil announcing "Do not transport seedlings from countries with the presence of the pest to Brazil"

The microconidia are ellipsoidal and have either a single septum or none at all. They are formed from phialides in false heads by basipetal division. They are important in secondary infection.

The chlamydospores are globose with thick walls. They are either formed from hyphae or by the modification of hyphal cells. They endure in soils for long periods and act as inocula in primary infection.

The macroconidia and chlamydospores are normally only formed on dead or dying host plants. Chlamydospores are the most significant survival structures of this pathogen.

The teleomorph or sexual reproductive stage of F. oxysporum is unknown.

Four races of this pathogen have been described which attack different banana cultivars:

- Race 1 attacks cultivars in the Musa (AAA group) 'Gros Michel' and caused the 20th century epidemic. It also attacks 'Ducasse', 'Lady Finger', Musa (AAB group) 'Pome' and its subgroups, Musa (AAB group) 'Silk' and Musa (ABB group) 'Pisang Awak'. (See § Race 1.)
- Race 2 attacks Musa (ABB group) 'Bluggoe' and its close relatives. (See § Race 2.)
- Race 3 attacks Heliconia spp. (See § Race 3.)
- Race 4 attacks Musa (AAA group) 'Dwarf Cavendish' as well as the hosts of races 1 and 2. (See § Race 4.)

== Taxonomy ==
A ribosomal intergenic spacer analysis by Kurtz and Schouten 2009 failed to distinguish some F. oxysporum isolates merely endophytic on Musa from pathogenic Foc strains.

== Dispersal ==
Splash by rainfall, movement of contaminated soil, and movement of contaminated propagation materials are the major means of dispersal of Foc. Dispersal by wind alone remains unproven and while animals can test positive for Foc on their outer surfaces, it remains unproven whether they can be effective vectors. Although it is a soil-borne pathogen, it does not compete well against other soil microbes for growth on dead buried tissue. It is nonetheless able to produce infection in living Musa hosts after a complete absence of hosts for 20 years - despite a population decline of 97% within the first three years. This is thought to be due to durable chlamydospores and due to persistence as an asymptomatic infection.

== Infection process ==
Anigorufone is a phytoalexin produced by Musa. It is a nematicidal compound and so infection with Foc induces an anti-nematode defense. Anigorufone is the only nematicidal or nematistatic compound known among the phytoalexins. Foc rapidly invades cortical cells as do many other Fo f.sp..

== Reproduction ==
There is some debate as to whether Foc is sexual and this is investigated by studying its history of recombination - or lack of it. One study of the linkage disequilibrium of gametes showed relatively high disequilibrium and another a high degree of correlation between independent genetic markers, both of which are diagnostic for a lack of recombination and thus a clonal population. Other post-sequencing data analysis performed by the disequilibrium study also failed to reject recombination however this could be consistent with horizontal transfer. Horizontal transfer has been experimentally induced and appears to have been proven in Focs past and so seems the more likely explanation. Both Fo mating types have been observed in Foc and protoperithecia-like structures are produced, but not the sexual structures. This does not necessarily mean that the sexual process has degenerated however, instead this may be a defect of the experiment.

Spores germinate at a higher rate in the presence of Musa root secondary metabolites from susceptible cultivars than those from resistant cultivars. This suggests that inhibition of germination is an important part of host resistance.

== Tropical Race 1/TR1 ==
Tropical Race 1/TR1 is also found in Paspalum fasciculatum, Panicum purpurescens, Ixophorus unisetus, and Commelina diffusa in Central America. These weeds may be acting as an inoculum source.

== Tropical Race 3/TR3 ==
Tropical Race 3/TR3 is a pest of Heliconia ornamental flowers. Formerly reported to be a lesser pest of Musa balbisiana seedlings and of Gros Michel, but that is no longer thought to be true. Now renamed Fusarium oxysporum f. sp. heliconiae.

== Race 4 ==
=== Tropical Race 4/TR4 ===
Fusarium odoratissimum

Scientific classification
- Kingdom: Fungi
- Division: Ascomycota
- Class: Sordariomycetes
- Order: Hypocreales
- Family: Nectriaceae
- Genus: Fusarium
- Species: F. odoratissimum

Binomial name
- Fusarium odoratissimum Maryani et al., 2019

Synonyms
- Foc strain TR4

Tropical Race 4/TR4 belongs to vegetative compatibility group 01213/16. All cultivars which are susceptible to Race 1 and Race 2 are susceptible to TR4 (see § Race 1 and § Race 2). Starting in 2019 some authorities are following Maryani et al., 2019 in regarding this strain as Fusarium odoratissimum. However, the validity of this taxonomic change has been challenged.

=== Subtropical Race 4/STR4 ===
Subtropical Race 4/STR4 is a subtropical race and does not become symptomatic on Cavendish until the trees are stressed by cold. Also found in Paspalum spp. and Amaranthus spp. in Australia. These weeds may be acting as sources of inoculum.

== Research ==
Much research is being undertaken because of the urgency in formulating effective control methods for Panama disease and breeding resistant banana cultivars. Researchers at University Sains Malaysia are examining variability in the genome of the pathogen and its genetic variability is being studied, as are the evolutionary relationships within vegetative compatibility groups of the pathogen.

Research into the phylogenetic relationships among the different strains of F. oxysporum that cause wilt of banana has been undertaken to determine whether the strains that are specific to the banana have descended from a common ancestor or have developed independently. Results of this study show that it is not monophyletic and appears to have multiple evolutionary origins. The largest lineages of F. oxysporum f. sp. cubense (§ Race 1 and § Race 2) are genetically distinct from a lineage originating from East Africa (§ Race 5) and developed pathogenicity for bananas independently from one another.

Identification, differentiation, and usage of vegetative compatibility groups is useful and valid within Foc because there are relatively few VCGs.

== Management ==
Segura-Mena et al., 2021 finds that Foc § R1 and § TR4 are highly sensitive to pH. They find that this is a potential management method in this disease.

== See also ==
- List of banana and plantain diseases
