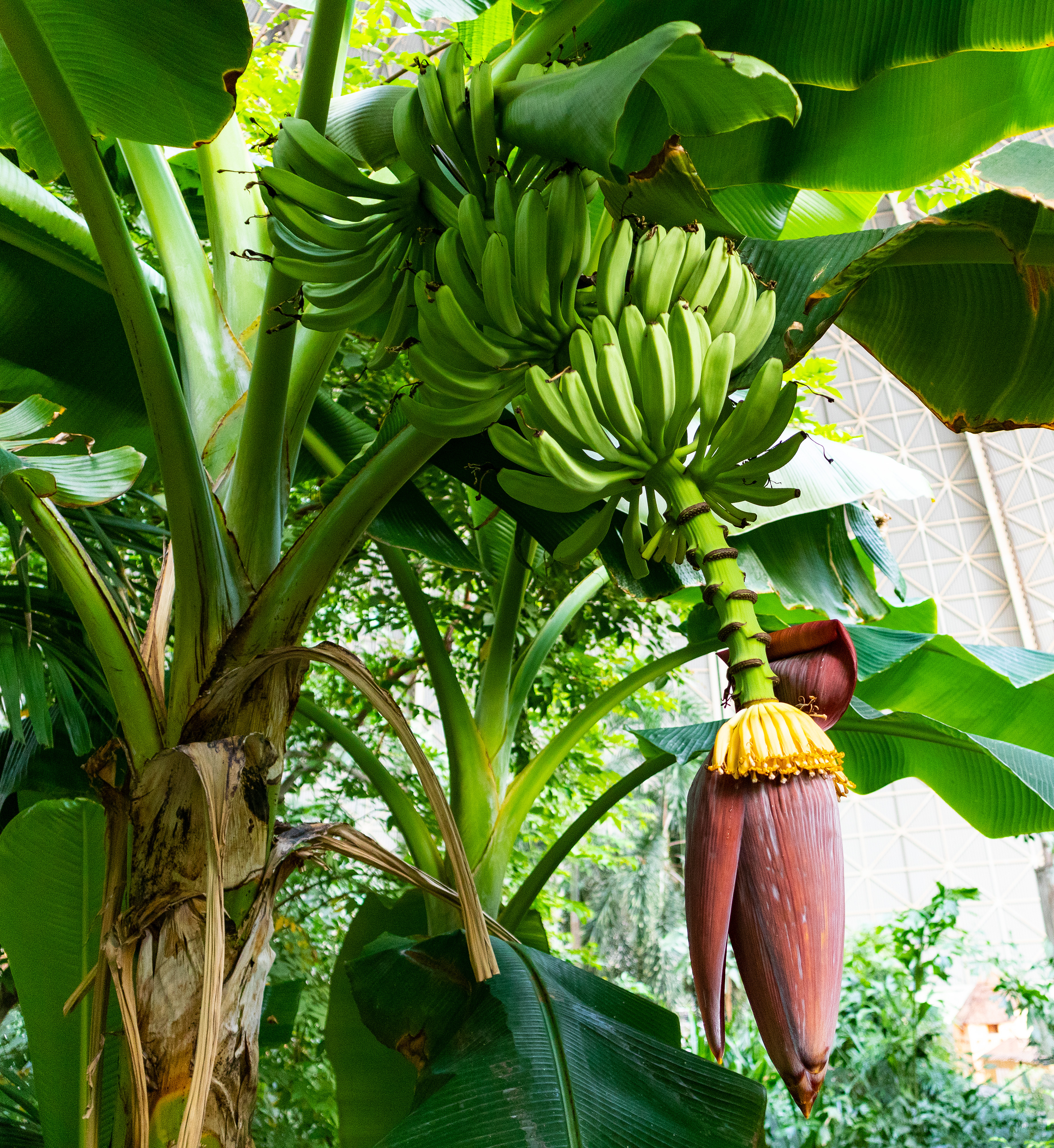

Scientific classification
- Kingdom: Plantae
- Clade: Embryophytes
- Clade: Tracheophytes
- Clade: Spermatophytes
- Clade: Angiosperms
- Clade: Monocots
- Clade: Commelinids
- Order: Zingiberales
- Family: Musaceae
- Genus: Musa
- Section: Musa sect. Musa
- Species: M. × paradisiaca

Binomial name
- Musa × paradisiaca L.
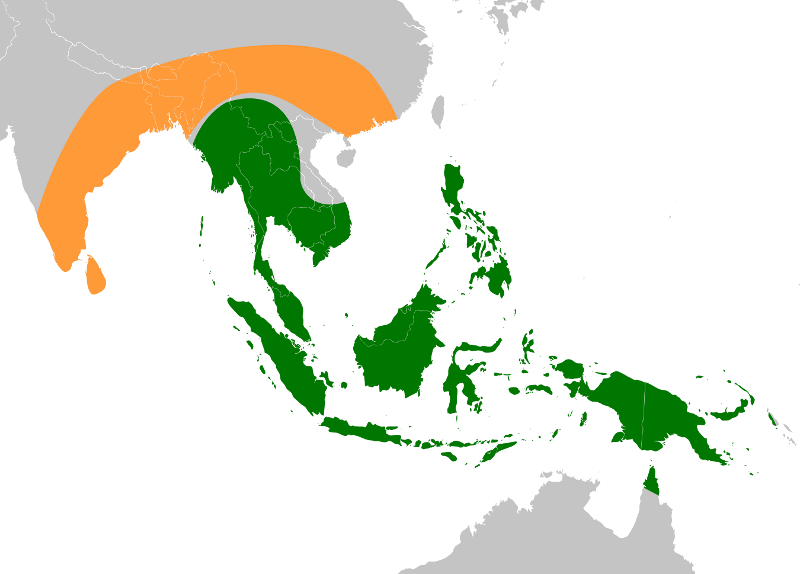
- Original native ranges of the ancestors of M. × paradisiaca: M. acuminata is shown in green and M. balbisiana in orange.

= Musa × paradisiaca =

Species of flowering plant

Musa × paradisiaca is a species as well as a cultivar, originating as the hybrid between Musa acuminata and Musa balbisiana, cultivated and domesticated by humans very early. Most cultivated bananas and plantains are polyploid cultivars either of this hybrid or of M. acuminata alone. Linnaeus originally used the name M. paradisiaca only for plantains or cooking bananas, but the modern usage includes hybrid cultivars used both for cooking and as dessert bananas. Linnaeus's name for dessert bananas, Musa sapientum, is thus a synonym of Musa × paradisiaca.

== Origin ==
Almost all cultivated plantains and many cultivated bananas are cultivars of the hybrid between two wild species, M. acuminata and M. balbisiana. It is believed that Southeast Asian farmers first domesticated M. acuminata. When the cultivated plants spread north-west into areas where M.balbisiana was native (see map), hybrids between the two species occurred and were then developed further into a wide range of cultivars.

Hundreds of cultivars of two species are known, possessing characteristics that are highly variable, but broadly intermediate between the ancestral species. They are typically 2–9 metres (7–30 ft) tall when mature. The above-ground part of the plant is a "false stem" or pseudostem, consisting of leaves and their fused bases. Each pseudostem can produce a single flowering stem. After fruiting, the pseudostem dies, but offshoots may develop from the base of the plant. Cultivars of banana are usually sterile, without seeds or viable pollen.

== Taxonomy ==
Banana plants were originally classified by Linnaeus into two species, which he called Musa paradisiaca for those used as cooking bananas (plantains), and M. sapientum for those used as dessert bananas. It was later discovered that both of his "species" were actually cultivated varieties of the hybrid between two wild species, M. acuminata and M. balbisiana, which is now called M. × paradisiaca L. The circumscription of the modern taxon M. × paradisiaca thus includes both the original M. paradisiaca and M. sapientum, the latter being reduced to a synonym of M. × paradisiaca.

In pre-Linnean times this banana was named 'Musa serapionis', for instance by Maria Sybilla Merian in her book, Metamorphosis insectorum Surinamensium, in 1705.

At one time, to deal with the great diversity of cultivated bananas and plantains, botanists created many other names which are now regarded as synonyms of M. × paradisiaca, such as M. corniculata Lour., used for a group of plantains with large fruit resembling the horns of a bull. Cultivated varieties are now given cultivar names, with the cultivars classified into groups and subgroups. Thus M. × paradisiaca is a species of banana as well as a cultivar. See list of banana cultivars for further information on the naming and classification of cultivars.
