= Lady finger banana =

Banana cultivar

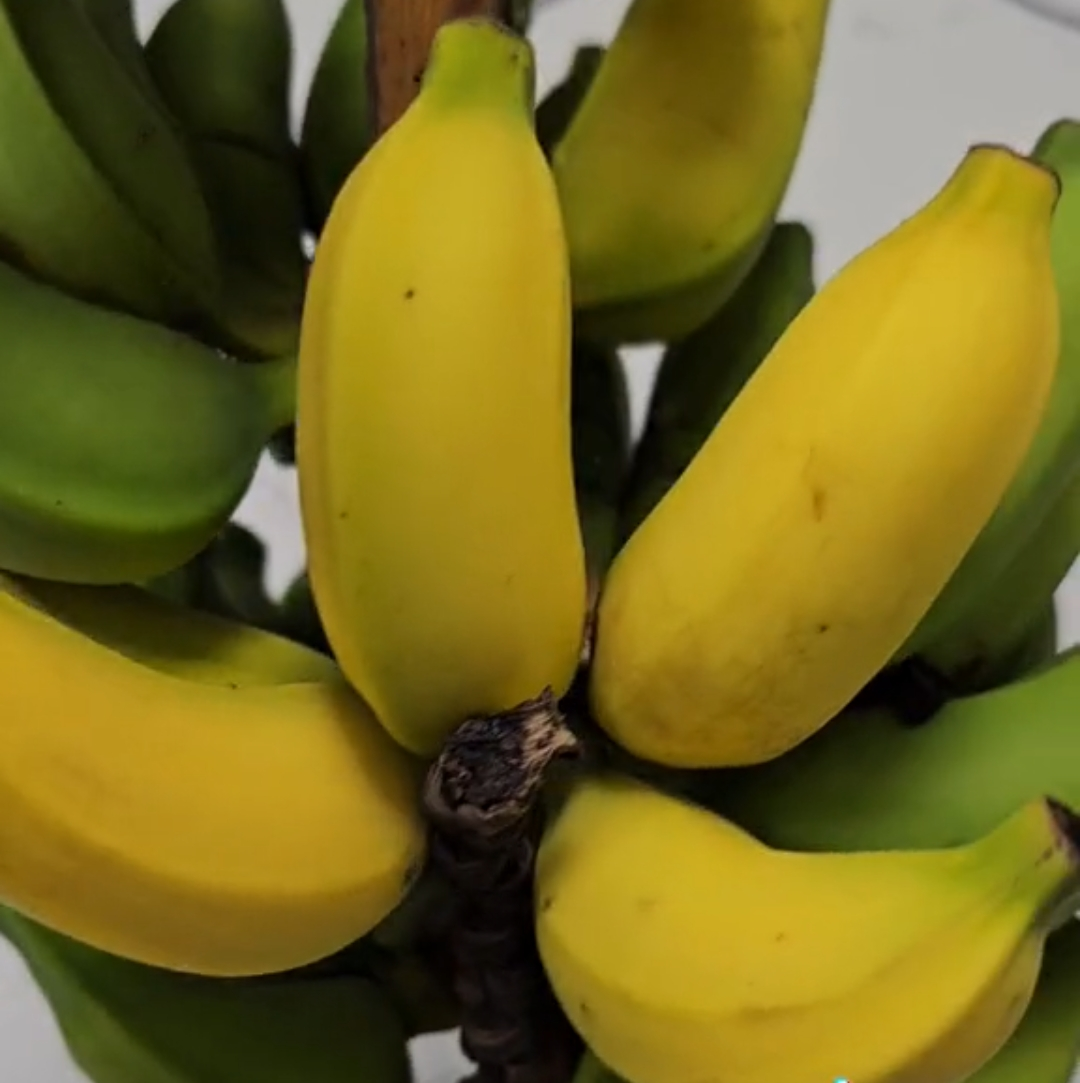
- Lady Finger banana fruit
- Hybrid parentage: Musa acuminata
- Cultivar group: Sucrier subgroup of the AA Group
- Cultivar: 'Lady Finger'
- Origin: Malaysia; Indonesia

Lady finger bananas (also known as sugar bananas, fig bananas, or date bananas) are diploid banana cultivars originating in Malaysia or Indonesia, belonging to the Sucrier subgroup of the AA banana cultivar group. Lady finger bananas are the most widely cultivated AA cultivar and are one of the world’s most popular local bananas. Its fruits are finger-sized, sweet, and thin-skinned.

== Taxonomy ==
Lady Finger banana is a diploid cultivar of the wild banana Musa acuminata, belonging to the Sucrier subgroup of the AA banana cultivar group. They were once placed under the Sucrier group in the old system of classification. Besides, ‘Lady (‘s) Finger’ has been used to name several distinct AA, AB and AAB clones; such as 'Ney Poovan' in same name subgroup (AB genome), 'Pome', 'Pacovan' and 'Pacha Nadan' in 'Pome subgroup' (AAB genome).

Its official designation is Musa (AA Group) 'Lady Finger'.

Synonyms include:

- Musa acuminata Colla (AA Group) 'Lady's Finger'
- Musa acuminata Colla (AA Group) 'Sucrier'
- Musa acuminata Colla (Sucrier Group) 'Lady's Finger'
- Musa × paradisiaca L. 'Lady Finger'
- Musa × paradisiaca L. cultigroup Sucrier 'Doigt de Femme'
- Musa × paradisiaca L. cultigroup Saccharinus 'Lady's Finger'
- Musa × paradisiaca L. cultigroup Saccharinus 'Dedo de Dama'
- Musa acuminata Colla non L. (Sucrier Group) 'Datil'
- Musa acuminata Colla non L. (Sucrier Group) 'Niño'
- Musa acuminata Colla non L. (Sucrier Group) 'Bocadillo'

== Common names ==
Musa (AA Group) 'Lady Finger' has many common names in other languages. Following are:

Common names of Lady Finger banana
Language	Common names	Location	References
Spanish	Orito	Ecuador	
Spanish	Dedo de Dama, Guineo niño, Manices, Datil, Nino	Latin America	
Spanish	Guineo blanco	Puerto Rico	
Spanish	Cambur Titiaro, Bocadillo	Colombia	
Spanish	Cambur Titiaro	Venezuela	
French	Banane-figue, Banane mignonne, Banane doigt de dame, Banane naine, Banana ficaire, Bananier "Sucrier"		
French	Banane figue sucrée, Figue sucrée, Fig sucré	West Indies	
Burmese	Segale nget pyaw (or Sagale nget pyaw)	Myanmar	
Portuguese	Banana ouro, Banana-figo, Banana dedo-de-dama, Banana anã	Brazil	
Hindi	Surya kadali	India	
Hindi	Parika	Guyana	
Pohnpei	Kudud	Pohnpei (Federated States of Micronesia)	
English	Lady Finger banana	Hawai'i	
English	Nino banana	Florida	
English	Fig banana, Date banana, Finger banana, Sugar banana		
Danish	Sukkerbanan, Figenbanan		
Dutch	Bananenvijg, Bananevijg.		
German	Zuckerbanane, Kleine Westindische Banane		
Italian	Banana d’oro, Banana fico, Banana nana		
Indonesian	Biu mas	Bali (Indonesia)	
Indonesian	Amasan, Pisang mas, Pisang emas	Indonesia	
Malay	Pisang mas, Pisang mas besar, Pisang mas Kampung.	Malaysia	
Tagalog	Amas, Caramelo, Kamoros	Philippines	
Thai	Kluai khai, Klue kai (กล้วยไข่)	Thailand	
Vietnamese	Chuoi trung	Vietnam	

== Origin and habitat ==
Lady Finger banana is a diploid cultivar originating in Malaysia or Indonesia. It is the most widely cultivated AA cultivar and is one of the world’s most popular local bananas. Lady Finger (AA), with much A in its genome, is notably difficult to grow and rarely survives with low moisture or humidity.

== Description ==
Lady Finger bananas trees can grow at a height of 7.5 metres (25 ft). Its pseudostem is slender but it has a heavy root system that makes it resistant to wind damage. The outer sheaths are dark-brown or streaked with reddish brown. The leaves are yellowish green and nearly free of wax. It blooms during mid-summer, late summer, and early fall. Each bunch, usually 10.4 kg in weight, typically having 10 to 14 hands. Each hands consists of 12 to 20 fruits. It is monocarpic and is propagated asexually.

Its depends on soil and climate, the fruit is finger-sized, reaching 4 to 5 inches (10 to 12 1/2 cm) in length, under perfect growing conditions. The skin is thin and light yellow. The flesh is deliciously sweet. Despite their resemblance, the Lady Finger banana must not be confused with the totally different cultivar Latundan banana which is a bit larger and has a sweet-sour taste. ‘Apple’ or ‘Manzana’ banana cultivars is also very similar to ‘Lady Finger’ in all respects except that its fruit's flavor is very much like a fresh apple.

== Nutrition ==
Lady finger bananas are carotenoid-rich, containing 315 μg β-Carotene/100 g. They are rich in vitamins and minerals.

== Diseases ==
Lady Finger bananas are resistant to Panama disease and the black weevil, but is susceptible to Sigatoka leaf spot.

== Uses ==
Lady Finger bananas are eaten fresh or used in desserts. Its preferred for fragrant aroma, sweetness, nutritional value and esthetic value. They are known for being superior to supermarket bananas. In Indonesia, Lady Finger banana is often used as a decoration in traditional ceremonies. Dwarf Lady Finger bananas, typically growing only up to 15 feet (4 1/2 m) in height, are also cultivated as houseplants.

== See also ==
- Banana
- Banana cultivar groups
- Musa
- Musa acuminata
