= Panama disease =

Plant disease of bananas

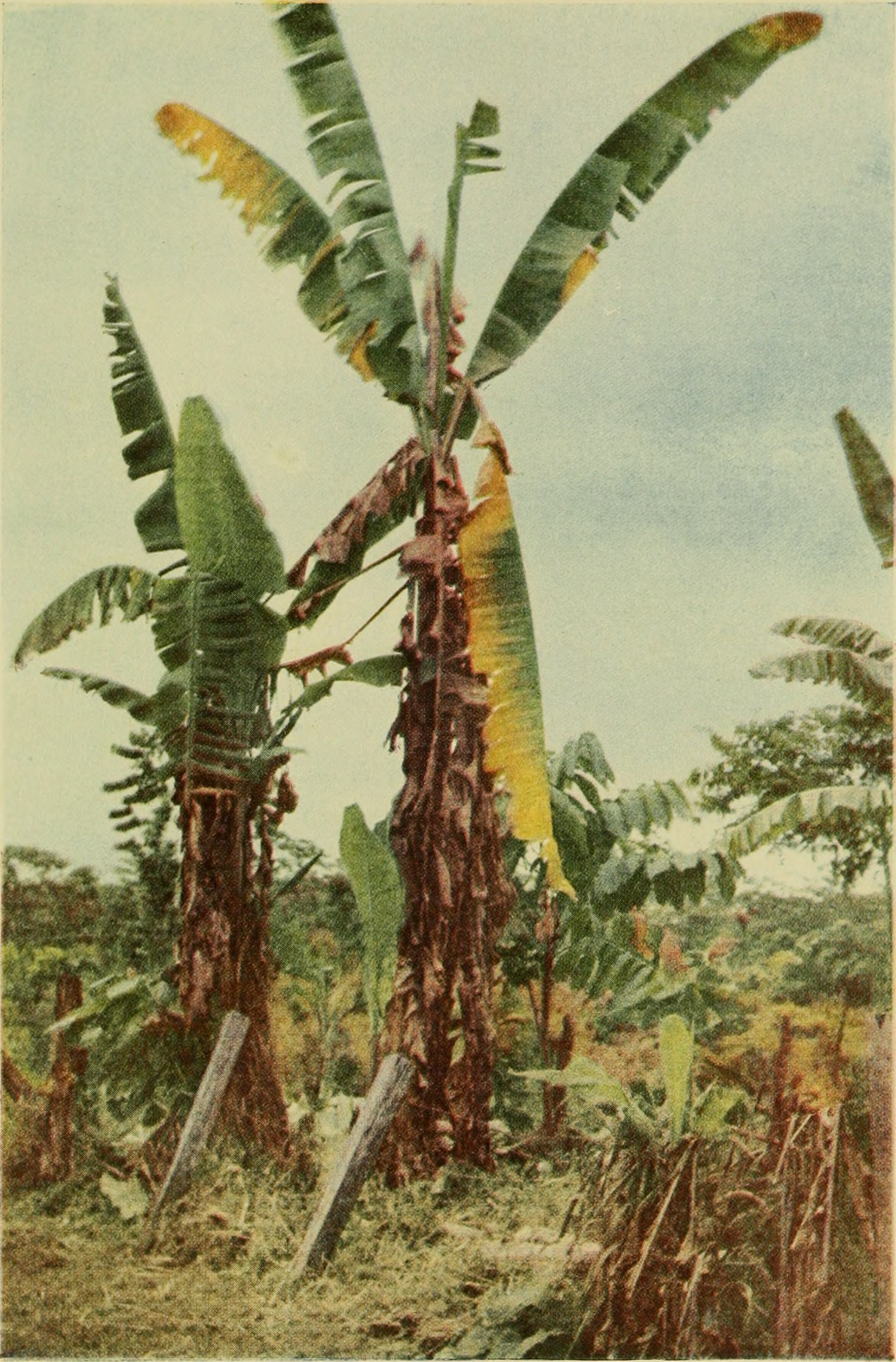
- Gros Michel banana affected by disease, Costa Rica, 1919
- Common names: Panama disease Fusarium wilt of banana Vascular wilt of banana
- Causal agents: Fusarium oxysporum f.sp. cubense
- Hosts: Banana
- Vectors: Water, soil residues, replanting of suckers, farming tools and transport, leaf trash
- EPPO Code: FUSACB
- Distribution: Indonesia, China, Malaysia, Australia, the Philippines, Jordan, Vietnam, Laos, Pakistan, Lebanon, Mozambique, Oman

Panama disease (or Fusarium wilt) is a plant disease that infects banana plants (Musa spp.). It is a wilting disease caused by the fungus Fusarium oxysporum f. sp. cubense. The pathogen is resistant to fungicides, and its control is limited to phytosanitary measures.

During the 1950s, an outbreak of Panama disease almost wiped out commercial Gros Michel banana production. The Gros Michel banana was the dominant cultivar of bananas, and Fusarium wilt inflicted enormous costs and forced producers to switch to other, disease-resistant cultivars. Since the 2010s, a new outbreak of Panama disease caused by the strain Tropical Race 4 (TR4) has threatened the production of the Cavendish banana, today's most popular cultivar.

== Overview ==
Although fruits of the wild banana plants (Musa spp.) have large, hard seeds, most edible bananas are seedless. Banana plants are therefore propagated asexually from offshoots. Because these rhizomes are usually free of symptoms even when the plant is infected by Fusarium oxysporum f.sp. cubense (Foc), they are a common means by which this pathogen is disseminated. It can also be spread in soil and running water, on farm implements or machinery.

Panama disease is one of the most destructive plant diseases of modern times. It is believed to have originated in Southeast Asia and was first reported in Australia in 1876. The disease did not attract widespread attention until the early 20th century when it began heavily affecting banana cultivations in Panama and Costa Rica. By 1950 it had spread to all the banana-producing regions of the world with the exception of some islands in the South Pacific, the Mediterranean, Melanesia and Somalia.

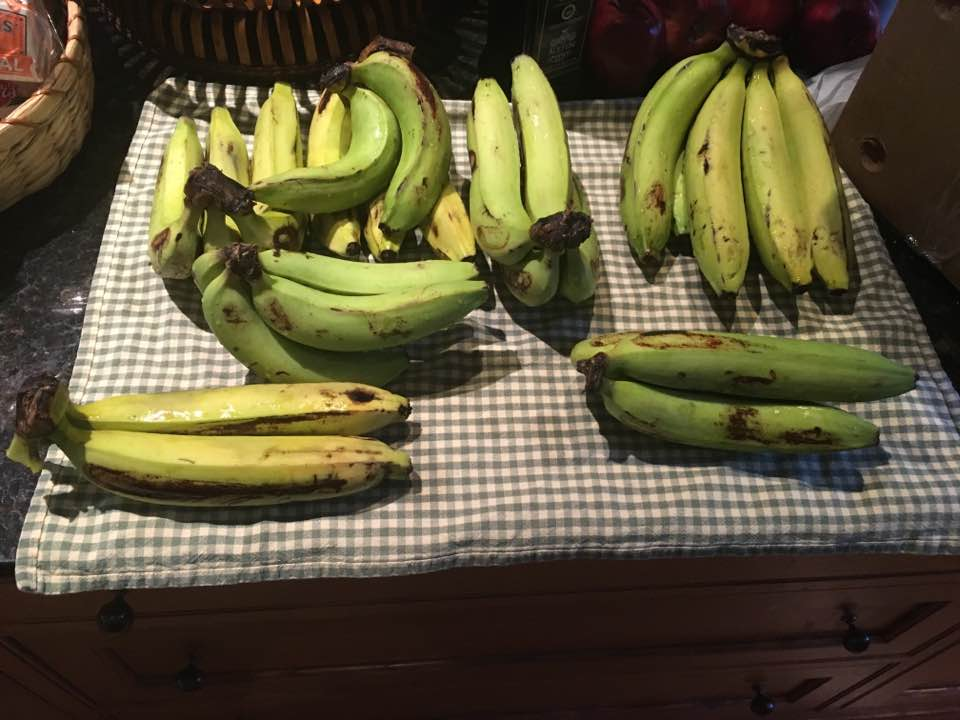
Gros Michel

Panama disease affects a wide range of banana cultivars; however, it is best known for the damage it caused to a single cultivar in the early export plantations. Before 1960, a total reliance was put on the cultivar 'Gros Michel', and it supplied almost all the export trade. It proved susceptible to the disease, and the use of infected rhizomes to establish new plantations caused widespread and severe losses. Some indication of the scale of the losses is demonstrated by the eradication of production on 30,000 hectares (74,000 acres) of plantation in the Ulua Valley of Honduras between 1940 and 1960. In Suriname, an operation of 4,000 hectares (9,900 acres) was out of business within eight years, and in the Quepos area of Costa Rica, 6,000 hectares (15,000 acres) were destroyed in 12 years. Overall fungal diseases—including most prominently Foc—are disproportionately important to small island developing states.

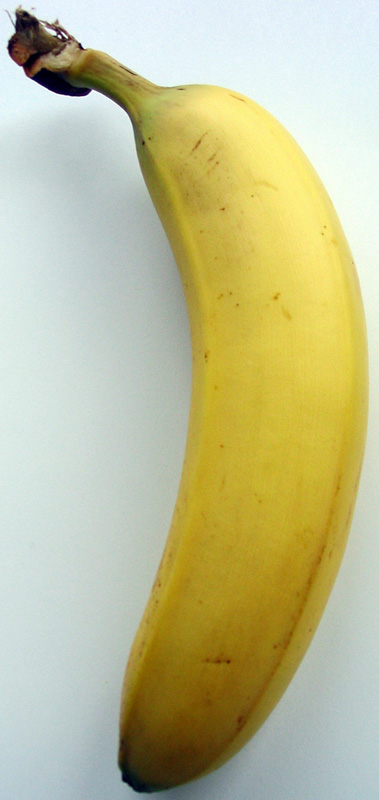
Cavendish

By the middle of the 20th century, resistant cultivars in the 'Cavendish' subgroup were being used as a substitute for 'Gros Michel' in the export trade. For a time these cultivars did prove resilient and grew well, and in some areas remain the clones on which the current export trade is based. However, in several growing areas in the Eastern Hemisphere, these cultivars are falling to TR4. This poses a significant threat to production, because there are currently no acceptable replacement cultivars. It is anticipated by experts that disease surveillance, integrated pest management, breeding of resistant cultivars, and genetic engineering will yield worthwhile results. This conclusion comes from an economic analysis which examined these as investments which governments and international organizations may or may not choose to invest in. Their opinion was that there would be positive yield from these investments, taken as either net present value or the internal rate of return.

A variant cultivar called Formosana (GCTCV-218), a type of Taiwanese Cavendish, has been reported in the popular press as having some resistance to TR4, as well as by Molina et al 2009, although in 2015 Ploetz was of the opinion that it has been evaluated as having no resistance at all. 'GCTCV-119' is another Taiwanese Cavendish used commercially for its TR4 resistance.

The TR4 variant also affects plantains (Musa acuminata × balbisiana) which are an important staple food in tropical regions of the world. Apart from the export trade, 85% of banana production is for local consumption, and many of the cultivars used for this purpose are also susceptible to infection.

== Distribution ==
Not all banana-producing countries have been affected by the outbreak of Panama disease. TR4 was first identified in Taiwan, and from there rapidly spread to Indonesia, China, Malaysia, Australia and the Philippines. The disease was then identified in Jordan in 2013. TR4 later spread to Vietnam and Laos, as well as to the Middle East being reported in Pakistan and Lebanon. In 2015, the disease then spread to Africa, being informally announced in Mozambique and Oman. In August 2019, TR4 arrived in Colombia.

== Symptoms ==
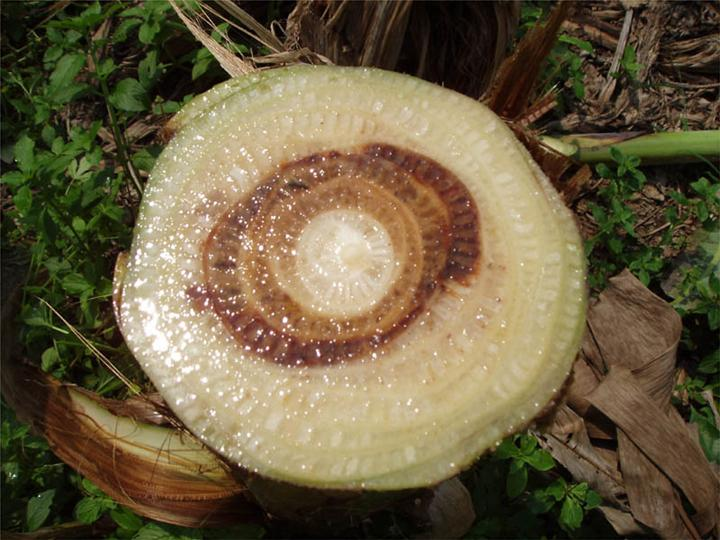
The fungus migrating up through the plant stem

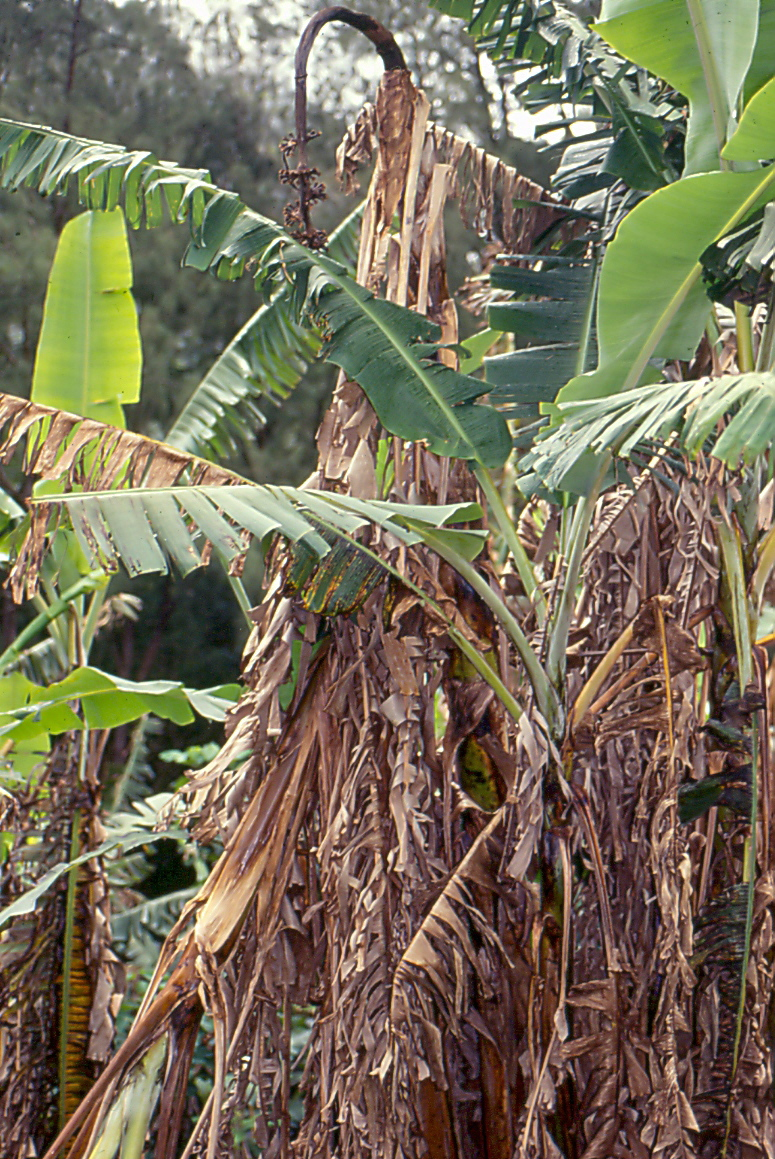
Banana trees wilting

Infection by Foc triggers the self-defense mechanisms of the host plant causing the secretion of a gel. This is followed by the formation of tylose in the vascular vessels which blocks the movement of water and nutrients to the upper parts of the plant. The infection begins at the tips of the feeder roots and then moves on to the rhizome. Sign of the disease is most noticeable as a dark stain where the stele joins the cortex. As the disease develops, large portions of the xylem turn a reddish-brown colour. Externally, the oldest leaves start turning yellow and there is often a longitudinal splitting of the lower part of the outer leaf sheaths on the pseudostem. The leaves begin to wilt and may buckle at the base of the petiole. As the disease progresses, younger leaves are affected, turn yellow and crumple, and the whole canopy begins to consist of dead or dying leaves. The leaf symptoms of Fusarium wilt can be confused with those of Xanthomonas wilt. In plants affected by Fusarium, yellowing and wilting of the leaves typically progresses from the older to the younger leaves. The wilted leaves may also snap at the petiole and hang down the pseudostem. In plants affected by Xanthomonas, the wilting can begin with any leaf and the infected leaves tend to snap along the leaf blade.

Two external symptoms help characterize Panama disease of banana:

- Yellow leaf syndrome, the yellowing of the border of the leaves which eventually leads to bending of the petiole.
- Green leaf syndrome, which occurs in certain cultivars, marked by the persistence of the green color of the leaves followed by the bending of the petiole as in yellow leaf syndrome. Internally, the disease is characterized by a vascular discoloration. This begins in the roots and rhizomes with a yellowing that proceeds to a reddish-brown color in the pseudostem, as the pathogen blocks the plant's nutrient and water transport.
- With proceeding infection, the banana pseudostem can split, and eventually the whole plant collapses.

External symptoms often get confused with the symptoms of bacterial wilt of banana, but ways to differentiate between the two diseases include:

- Fusarium wilt proceeds from older to younger leaves, but bacterial wilt is the opposite.
- Fusarium wilt has no symptoms on the growing buds or suckers, no exudates visible within the plant, and no symptoms in the fruit. Bacterial wilt can be characterized by distorted or necrotic buds, bacterial ooze within the plant, and fruit rot and necrosis.

Once a banana plant is infected, recovery is rare, but if it does occur, any new emerging suckers will already be infected and can propagate disease if planted.

== Classification and host range ==
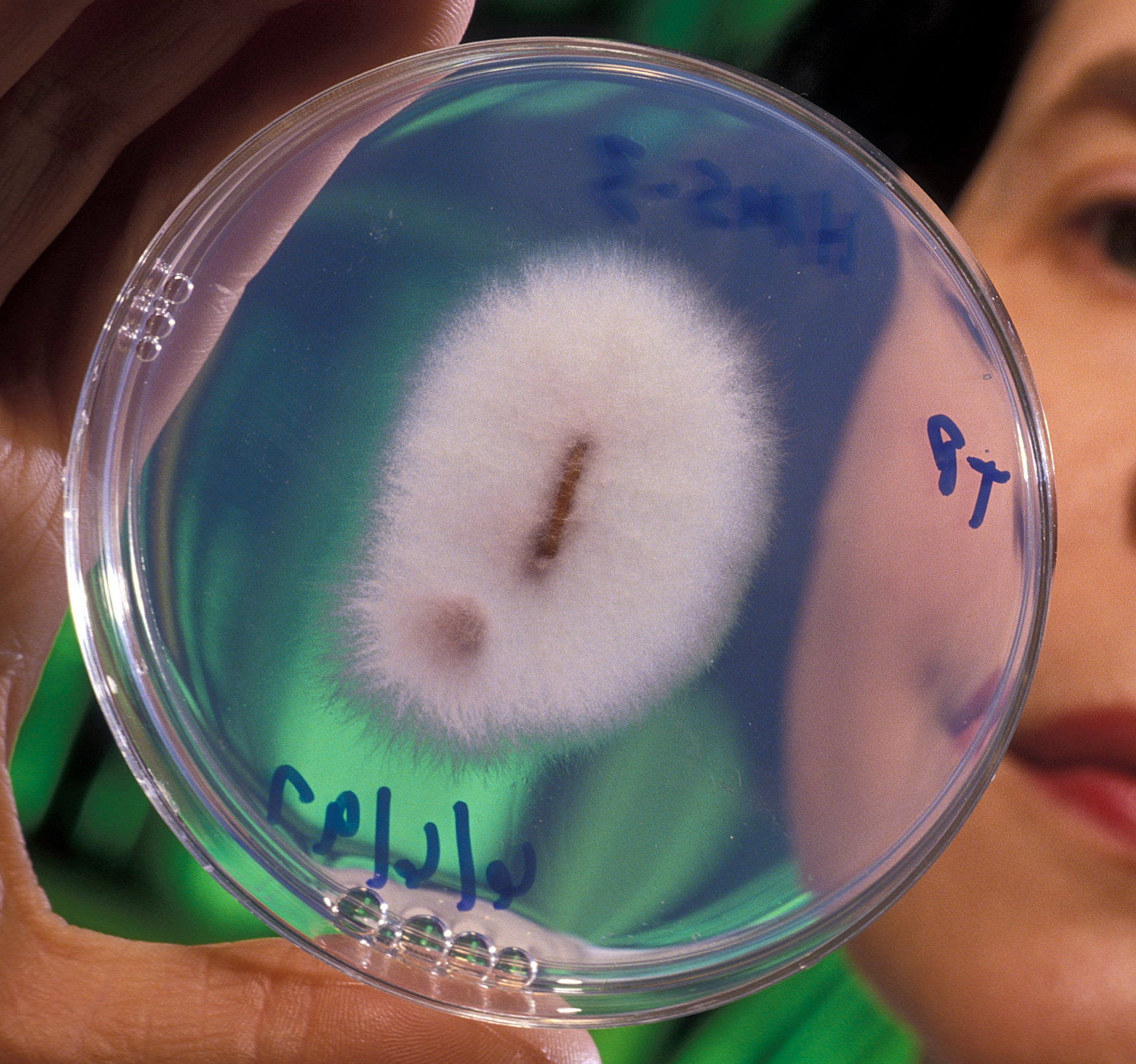
Foc causes the disease

Foc is a member of the Fusarium oxysporum species complex, a group of ascomycete fungi with morphological similarities. Based on their different host species, the plant pathogenic fungi of this species complex are divided into approximately 150 special forms (formae specialis, f.sp.). Foc mainly infects banana (Musa) species. The special form cubense has been subdivided into four different races, which each attack a different group of banana genotypes.

- Race 1 was involved in the 1960s Panama disease outbreak which destroyed much of the Gros Michel banana plantations in Central America. In addition to Gros Michel, Race 1 also attacks other members of the banana AAB genomic group, including Abacá, Maqueño, the Silk subgroup, the Pome subgroup, Pisang Awak, Ducasse, and Lady Finger. Cavendish cultivars are resistant to Race 1.
- Race 2 infects cooking bananas with ABB genome and the Bluggoe subgroup.
- Race 3 infecting Heliconia spp. is no longer considered pathogenic to bananas and has been renamed Fusarium oxysporum f.sp. heliconiae.
- Race 4 is the causal agent of the current Panama disease outbreak since it is pathogenic to the currently used Cavendish cultivars (AAA genome). Race 4 is further subdivided into Tropical Race 4 (TR4) and Subtropical Race 4 (STR4). The latter only infects Cavendish and Race 1 and 2 susceptibles under abiotic stress.

=== Tropical Race 1/TR1 ===
Tropical Race 1/TR1 is also found in Paspalum fasciculatum, Panicum purpurescens, Ixophorus unisetus, and Commelina diffusa in Central America. These weeds may be acting as an inoculum source. As of 13 November 2020, TR1 is found in Queensland.

=== Tropical Race 2/TR2 ===
As of 13 November 2020, Tropical Race 2/TR2 is found in Queensland.

=== Tropical Race 3/TR3 ===
Tropical Race 3/TR3 is a pest of Heliconia ornamental flowers. Formerly reported to be a lesser pest of Musa balbisiana seedlings and of Gros Michel, but that is no longer thought to be true. Now renamed Fusarium oxysporum f. sp. heliconiae.

=== Tropical Race 4/TR4 ===
Tropical Race 4/TR4 belongs to vegetative compatibility group 01213/16. All cultivars which are susceptible to Race 1 and Race2 are susceptible to TR4 (see § Race 1 and § Race 2).

=== Subtropical Race 4/STR4 ===
Subtropical Race 4/STR4 is a subtropical race and does not become symptomatic on Cavendish until the trees are stressed by cold. As of 13 July 2018 quarantines for STR4 are imposed over South East Queensland, northern New South Wales, and Western Australia. As of 13 November 2020 STR4 is found in South East Queensland. Also found in Paspalum spp. and Amaranthus spp. in Australia. These weeds may be acting as sources of inoculum.

== History ==
=== Gros Michel devastation era ===
The Gros Michel was the only type of banana eaten in the United States from the late 19th century until after World War II. The disease was serious and diagnosed in Panama banana plantations of Central America. Over several decades, the fungus spread from Panama to neighboring countries, moving north through Costa Rica to Guatemala and south into Colombia and Ecuador.

The banana industry was in a serious crisis, so a new banana thought to be immune to Panama disease was found and adopted, the Cavendish. In a few years, the devastated plantations resumed business as usual, and the transition went smoothly in the American market. Shortly thereafter, Malaysia entered the banana-growing business. Cavendish banana plantations were new to that country in the 1980s, but they rapidly expanded to meet the demand. Thousands of acres of rain forests and former palm oil plantations were shifted to banana production. Within a few years, though, the new plants began to die. While it took several years to find, the cause was ultimately attributed to Panama disease. Although the Cavendish was then thought to be immune, it was immune only to the strain of the fungus that destroyed the Gros Michel. The strain that devastated the Gros Michel banana became widespread in the Western Hemisphere during the 20th century, while genetically distinct strains of the pathogen were present in Southeast Asia, where the disease is believed to have originated; the Cavendish banana is susceptible to some of these strains. It killed and spread faster, inspiring more panic than its earlier counterpart in Panama. The newly discovered strain of F. oxysporum was named tropical race 4 (TR4).

=== "Banana Sol" incident in Jamaica ===
In April 1932, amidst the lack of effective treatments, The Daily Gleaner published reports of a new chemical cure called "Banana Sol." The product was marketed by Zenon Ioannon Solomides, a trained entomologist and member of the Linnean Society of London. Prominent planters and merchants lobbied the Jamaican government to invest in the product, despite it violating existing agricultural quarantine policies.

Subsequent investigations by Jamaican agricultural officials revealed that Solomides had a history of marketing ineffective agricultural solutions, including a failed cure for silver leaf disease in England. By May 1932, banana plants in Jamaica that had been treated with "Banana Sol" succumbed to the fungus, proving the cure ineffective. Solomides was declared bankrupt in London in 1936.

=== TR4 devastation era ===
TR4 was discovered in Taiwan in 1989. In July 2013, members of OIRSA, a Latin American regional organisation for plant and animal health, produced a contingency plan specific to TR4 for its nine member countries (Belize, Costa Rica, Dominican Republic, El Salvador, Guatemala, Honduras, Mexico, Nicaragua and Panama). The plan is only available in Spanish. In March 2015, Latin America growers met to create a regional defense effort and planned to meet again in September or October of that year. No specific regional measures are in place. Ecuadorian growers requested the government to fumigate all containers.

Scientists are trying to modify the banana plant to make it resist Panama disease and many other serious banana afflictions ranging from fungal, bacterial, and viral infections to nematodes and beetles. Researchers are combing remote jungles searching for new wild bananas. Hybrid bananas are being created in the hope of generating a new variety with strong resistance to diseases. However, the resulting fruit also needs to taste good, ripen in a predictable amount of time, travel long distances undamaged, and be easy to grow in great quantities. Currently, no cultivar or hybrid meets all of these criteria.

=== Australian quarantine ===
A farm in In Tully, Queensland, was quarantined and some plants were destroyed after TR4 was detected in March 2015. After an initial shutdown of the infected farm, truckloads of fruit left in April with harvesting allowed to resume under strict biosecurity arrangements. The government says it is not feasible to eradicate the fungus. Researchers like Gert Kema, based at Wageningen University, Netherlands, say the disease will continue to spread, despite efforts to contain it, as long as susceptible varieties are being grown. The disease was again detected in Tully in July 2017, prompting Biosecurity Queensland (BQ) to impose quarantine conditions.

Outside experts were brought in to review BQ's performance in 2021. Their assessment credits BQ with quick and effective response which is being emulated by other countries. Thus far TR4 continues to be contained to the Tully valley only, and containment is thought to be possible as long as accidental human movement and transport in flowing water can be halted.

=== Spread to Colombia ===
In August 2019, authorities in Colombia declared a national emergency after confirming that Panama disease had reached Latin America. "Once you see it, it is too late, and it has likely already spread outside that zone without recognition," said one expert quoted by National Geographic.

== Disease cycle ==
Modern commercially farmed banana plants are reproduced asexually, by replanting the plant's basal shoot that grows after the original plant has been cut down. Being triploid, the fruit contains no seeds, and the male flower does not produce pollen suitable for pollination, prohibiting sexual reproduction. This causes all bananas of a single breed to be nearly genetically identical. The fungus easily spreads from plant to plant because the individual plants' defenses are nearly identical.

The disease is dispersed by spores or infected material that travel in surface water or farming activities. Spread of the disease is exacerbated the method of propagation. Suckers are taken from one plant and clonally propagated to grow new plants. About 30 to 40% of suckers from a diseased plant are infected, but not all show symptoms, so the chance of growing a new, already infected plant is fairly high. The disease is also known to infect certain weeds without showing symptoms, meaning it can survive in the absence of banana plants and remain undetected in a place where bananas are planted later.

Foc is thought to persist only asexually, as no sexual phase (teleomorph) has been observed. Recombination events may occur via somatic hybridisation and the parasexual cycle. This means that the survival and dispersal of the disease relies on purely asexual spores and structures. The disease survives in chlamydospores which are released as the plant dies and can survive in the soil for up to 30 years. When the environment is ideal and there are host roots available (fungus is attracted to root exudates), these chlamydospores will germinate and hyphae will penetrate the roots, initiating infection. There is an increase in the number of symptomatic plants when inflorescences emerge and the highest disease incidence occurs right before harvest. Once infected, microconidia are produced and proliferate within the vessels of the plant's vascular system. Macroconidia are another asexual spore that tend to be found on the surface of plants killed by Panama disease. Infection is systemic, moving through the vascular system and causing yellowing and buckling that starts in older leaves and progresses to younger leaves until the entire plant dies.

Splash by rainfall, movement of contaminated soil, and movement of contaminated propagation materials are the major means of dispersal of Foc. Dispersal by wind alone remains unproven, and while animals can test positive for Foc on their outer surfaces, it remains unproven whether they can be effective vectors.

== Disease management ==
As fungicides are largely ineffective, there are few options for managing Panama disease. Chemical sterilisation of the soil with methyl bromide significantly reduced incidence of the disease but was found to be effective for only three years after which the pathogen had recolonised the fumigated areas. Injecting the host plants with carbendazim and potassium phosphonate appears to provide some control but results have been inconclusive. Heat treatment of soil has also been tried in the Philippines but the pathogen is likely to reinvade the treated area. The greatest hope for managing this disease in infested soils is the development of genetic modifications that will provide resistant cultivars. Early research into Foc often was conducted by large companies with a financial interest in banana productivity, especially the United Fruit Company and pathologist Frederick Wellman in the 1920s.

Modified bananas developed in collaboration by Ugandan and Belgian scientists were reported in 2008 to be grown experimentally in Uganda. In Australia the movement, sharing, and sale of propagation material is heavily restricted, especially between states, to slow down the combined threat of TR4, Bunchy Top, and leaf spot. The RGA2 gene is (as of 2017) totally effective against TR4. It is unexpressed in Cavendish but has been found expressed in the diploid M. a. ssp. malaccensis. It may be possible to produce an expressing Cavendish with CRISPR.

Several bacterially-derived volatile organic compounds have been found by Yuan et al 2012 to be selectively toxic to Foc: Various alkylated benzenes, various phenols, various naphthalenes, benzothiazole, 2-ethyl-1-hexanol, 2-undecanol, 2-nonanone, 2-decanone, 2-undecanone, nonanal, and decanal. Currently, fungicides and other chemical and biological control agents have proven fairly unsuccessful, or only successful in vitro or in greenhouses, in the face of Panama disease of bananas. The most commonly used practices include mostly sanitation and quarantine practices to prevent the spread of Panama disease out of infected fields. However, the most effective tool against Panama disease is the development of banana plants resistant to Foc. The clonal reproduction of banana has led to a consequential lack of other varieties. Efforts are being made to produce resistant varieties, but with bananas being triploids which do not produce seeds, this is not an easy task. Creating clones from tissue cultures, rather than suckers, has proven somewhat successful in breeding resistant varieties, although these tend to have decreased success in stress-tolerance, yield, or other beneficial traits necessary for commercial varieties. Nevertheless, these efforts are leading to the best control measure for Panama disease of banana.

In 2017, a disease-resistance gene (RGA2) was transformed into Cavendish bananas which showed disease resistance to TR4. One specific transformed line, which consisted of eight plants, showed resistance in the field for all of them. The field trial lasted three years, and the plants exhibited a yield drag. Taiwanese researchers believe that the onset of TR4 was linked to soil degradation caused by the use of chemical fertilizers. Hong et al 2020 achieved significant suppression with a chilli pepper/banana rotation. This success is not merely applicable to Musa or even crops in general - it suggests that a similar "rotation" concept in livestock is advisable. The resistance of different banana cultivars to the pathogen is under scrutiny. The FAO provides a sanitation and diagnostic manual.

=== Banana breeding impeded by triploidy ===
One major impediment to breeding bananas is polyploidy; Gros Michel and Cavendish bananas are triploid and thus attempts at meiosis in the plant's ovules cannot produce a viable gamete. Only rarely does the first reduction division in meiosis in the plants' flowers tidily fail completely, resulting in a euploid triploid ovule, which can be fertilized by normal haploid pollen from a diploid banana variety; a whole stem of bananas would contain only a few seeds and sometimes none. As a result, the resulting new banana variety is tetraploid, and thus contains seeds; the market for bananas is not accustomed to bananas with seeds. Experience showed that where both meiosis steps failed, causing a heptaploid seedling, or when the seedling is aneuploid, results are not as good.

Second-generation breeding using those new tetraploids as both parents has tended not to yield good results, because the first generation contains the Gros Michel triploid gene set intact (plus possibly useful features in the added fourth chromosome set), but in the second generation, the Gros Michel gene set has been broken up by meiosis.

The Honduras Foundation for Agricultural Research cultivates several varieties of the Gros Michel. They have succeeded in producing a few seeds by hand-pollinating the flowers with pollen from diploid seeded bananas.

== Timeline of geographic spread ==
=== 1997 ===
- The first detection in Australia occurs near Darwin, Northern Territory.

=== 2005 ===
- Chloris inflata, Euphorbia heterophylla, Cyanthillium cinereum, and Tridax procumbens, in banana farms in Australia known to be infected with TR4. These weeds may be acting as sources of inoculum.

=== 2010 ===
- Starting here TR4 spread from its origin in southeast Asia westward into Vietnam, Laos, Myanmar, India, Pakistan, Oman, Jordan, Lebanon, Israel, and Mozambique.

=== 2015 ===
- March 26: Sample taken from a suspect tree on a farm in Mareeba, Queensland, Australia.
- March 28: TR4 was detected in those samples. The far north of Queensland producing 95% of the $580 million of bananas Australia turns out every year, this was immediately taken seriously by Biosecurity Queensland's Panama TR4 Program and the Australian Banana Growers' Council.

- However, the test used (the Dita PCR) was questioned after this detection was reported, and is no longer used by BQ. A dissection of the tree trunk showed none of the usual symptoms of Fusarium infiltration.

- May 18: Another 18 samples (of unspecified individual(s) from the same farm) tested negative.

- BQ decided to only use vegetative compatibility groups and molecular diagnostics from then on.

- First legitimate detection later in the year in Tully, Queensland.

=== 2017 ===
- Queensland University of Technology researchers located a gene (RGA2) which is present but unexpressed in Cavendish, which they found expressed and effective against TR4 in the diploid M. a. ssp. malaccensis.

=== 2018 ===
- As of 13 July 2018 TR4 is found widely throughout Southeast Asia.

=== 2020 ===
- As of November 2020 TR4 was still only found on five plantations in the same area due to this government and industry response. Queensland's response to TR4 has been of interest to countries in Latin America as TR4 moves into that region for the first time.
- As of 13 November 2020 TR4 is found in Laos, Vietnam, Taiwan, Malaysia, Borneo, Indonesia, mainland China, Philippines, Jordan, Mozambique, Pakistan, Lebanon, Oman, India, and North Queensland in Australia.

=== 2021 ===
- In April the first detection in Peru occurred, in the Department of Piura, and on the 11th the National Service for Agricultural Health declared a phytosanitary emergency for the whole country. Ecuador had already been inspecting imports at the border due to Colombia's detection, and then increased inspections further in April. The appearance of TR4 in Peru threatens its 170,000 hectares (420,000 acres) of plantations.

=== 2026 ===
- In January, the presence in Ecuador is confirmed.

== See also ==
- List of banana and plantain diseases
- Black sigatoka (a leaf-spot disease of banana plants caused by the ascomycete fungus Mycosphaerella fijiensis (Morelet))
