= Señorita banana =

Banana cultivar

Musa acuminata 'Señorita'
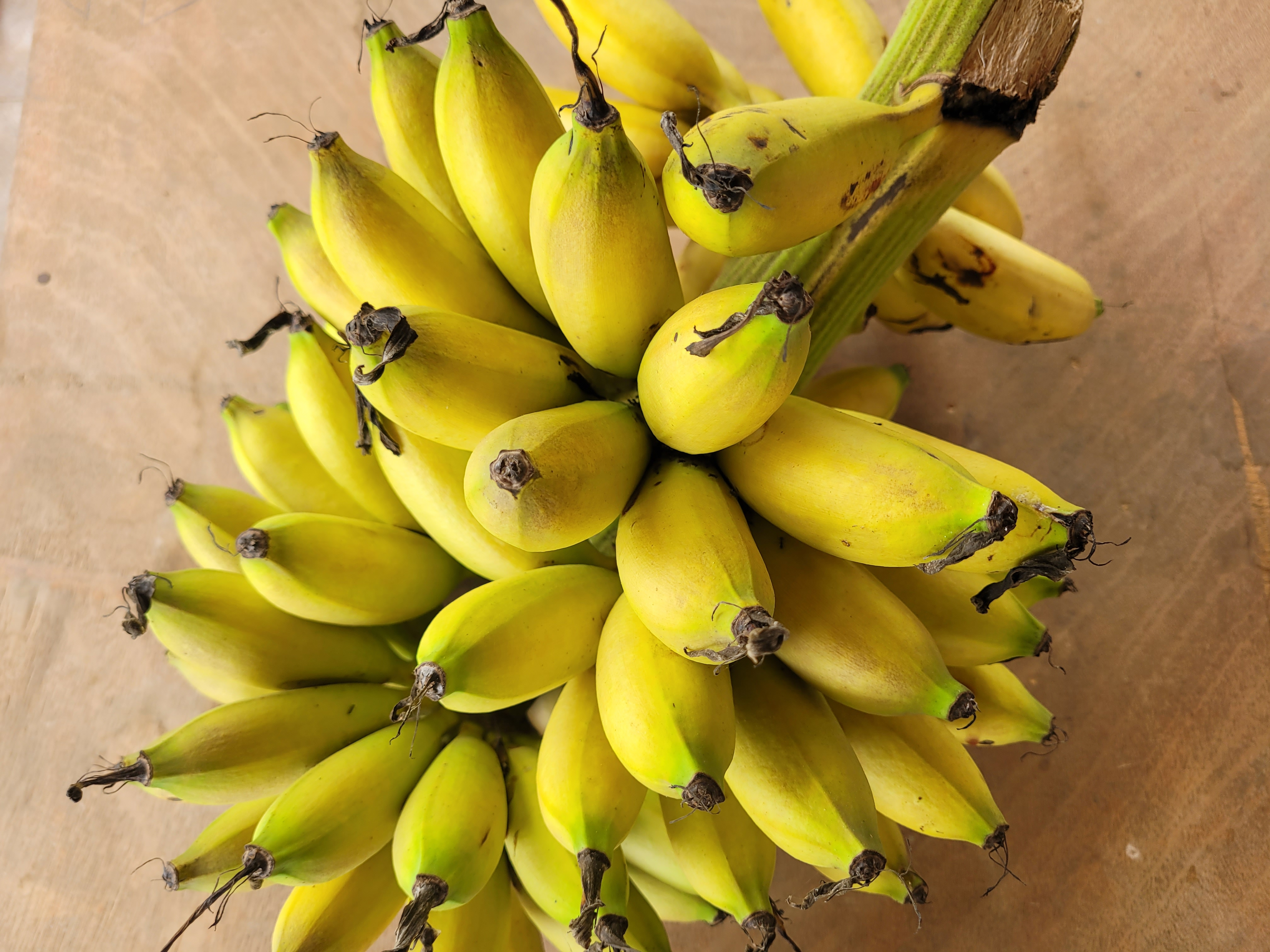
- Species: Musa acuminata
- Cultivar group: AA Group
- Cultivar: 'Señorita'
- Origin: Philippines

Señorita bananas (translated to Little Lady bananas) are diploid cultivars of the banana Musa acuminata originating in the Philippines. They are very small stout bananas which, like all bananas belonging to the AA cultivar group, are known for being extraordinarily sweet. It is sweet and aromatic with custardy texture.

They are also known by other names, such as Monkoy, Cariñosa bananas (translated to Adorable bananas), or Cuarenta Dias bananas (translated to Forty Day bananas).

== Taxonomy ==
Señorita bananas are diploid (AA) cultivars of the wild seeded banana Musa acuminata. Its accepted name is Musa acuminata (AA Group) 'Señorita'.

In other languages and regions, it is known as the following: in the Philippines, it is known as 'Monkoy', 'Sarot-sut', 'Cariños' or 'Cariñosa', 'Arnibal' or 'Inarnibal' in Negros Occidental (literally "syrup" in Hiligaynon), and 'Lunsuranon' in Surigao. It is also known as 'Pisang Lampung' in Indonesia. It is also commonly known as the 'Forty day banana' (Filipino/Spanish: 'Cuarenta Dias', Malaysian: 'Pisang Empat Puluh Hari'), a reference to the average amount of time between flowering and bearing fruits of this cultivar.

== Description ==
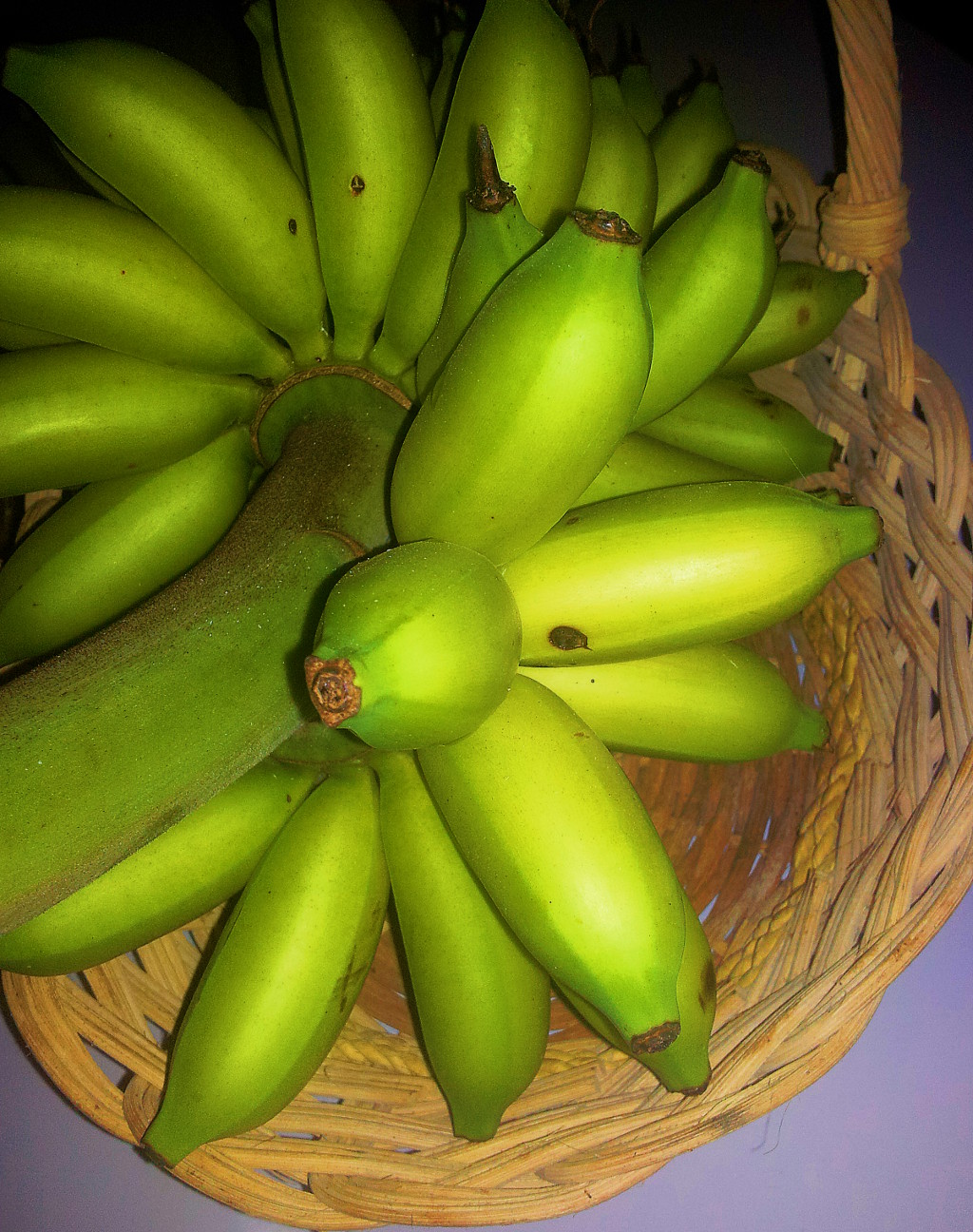
Ripening señorita bananas

Señorita bananas are some of the shortest banana cultivars, growing to a height of only 2.44 m (8.0 ft) with a pseudostem girth of 42 cm (17 in) at 1 m (3.3 ft) height. The pseudostem is green and shiny with a pink-purple underlying color. The leaves are very waxy with petioles that are sometimes bordered with pink-purple to red. The inflorescence hangs vertically with red-purple bracts which are yellow or green on the inside surface. Male flowers are colored yellow and are persistent. The plant begins to flower at about 231 days after planting. The time period from flowering to harvesting is 40 days (hence its common name in the Philippines of "Cuarenta dias").

The fruits are 85 mm (3.3 in) in length, with a width of 34 mm (1.3 in). The fruits are straight with a rounded transverse section and a bottle-necked apex. Fruits are light green and turn a light yellow when ripe. The skin is very thin and easily cracks when overripe, they also tend to snap off the stems by themselves when ripe.

== Uses ==
Fruits of the Señorita bananas are not as common as Lacatan and Latundan for dessert bananas in the Philippines, but they are still highly regarded for their exceptionally sweet taste and soft creamy flesh. They are seldom cultivated in large quantities due to their vulnerability to diseases and thus are more commonly found sold in small farmer stalls. They are popular treats for tourists visiting rural areas in the Philippines.

They are almost always eaten fresh, as their relative fragility makes it difficult to store or transport them over long distances. They are also rarely processed or used in cooking.

== See also ==
- Banana cultivar groups
- Musa
