= Anthurium plantagineum =

Conservation status
- Data Deficient (IUCN 3.1)

Scientific classification
- Kingdom: Plantae
- Clade: Tracheophytes
- Clade: Angiosperms
- Clade: Monocots
- Order: Alismatales
- Family: Araceae
- Genus: Anthurium
- Species: A. plantagineum

Binomial name
- Anthurium plantagineum Sodiro

Species of flowering plant

Anthurium plantagineum is a species of plant in the family Araceae. It is endemic to Ecuador. Its natural habitat is subtropical or tropical moist lowland forests. It is threatened by habitat loss.

The Latin specific epithet plantagineum refers to the leaves of the plant which are similar to those of a plantain.
