= Latundan banana =

Type of banana originating in the Philippines

Musa 'Silk'
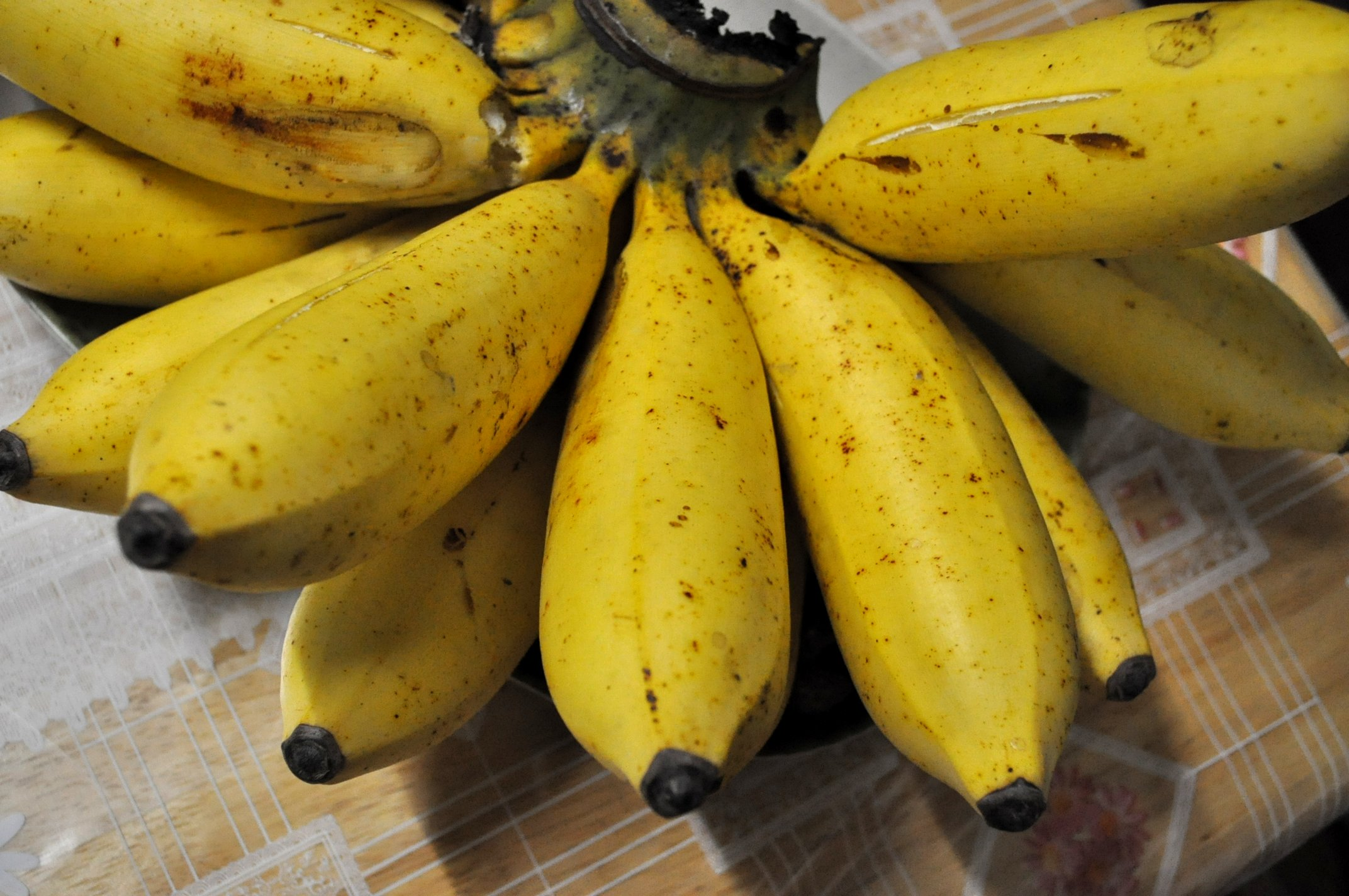
- Apple bananas
- Hybrid parentage: Musa acuminata × Musa balbisiana
- Cultivar group: AAB Group
- Cultivar: 'Silk'
- Origin: The Philippines

The Latundan banana (also called Tundan, silk banana, Pisang raja sereh, Manzana (or Manzano) banana, or apple banana) is a triploid hybrid banana cultivar of the AAB group from the Philippines. It is one of the most common banana cultivars in Southeast Asia, along with Lakatan and Saba bananas. Its Malaysian name is pisang rastali.

== Description ==
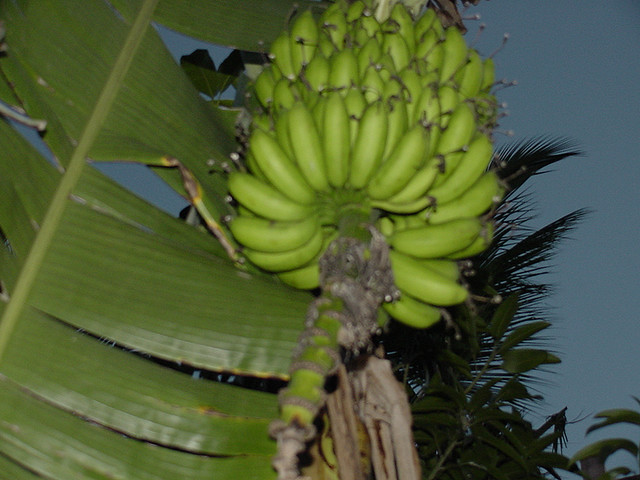
Unripe latundan bananas

Latundan banana plants typically reach a height of 2–4 meters (6 1/2–13 ft). They require full or partial sun exposure. The flowers are yellow, purple, or ivory in color. The fruits are round-tipped with thin yellow skin that splits once fully ripe. They are smaller than the Lacatan cultivar and the commercially dominant Cavendish bananas. They have a slightly acidic, apple-like flavor.

== Taxonomy ==
In older classifications, the Latundan cultivar was once the plant referred to as Musa sapientum. It has since been discovered that Musa sapientum is a hybrid cultivar of the wild seeded bananas Musa balbisiana and Musa acuminata and not a species.

The Latundan banana is a triploid (AAB) hybrid.

Its full name is Musa acuminata × Musa balbisiana (AAB Group) 'Silk'.

== Uses ==
=== Culinary ===
Latundan bananas are popular dessert bananas that are eaten raw or cooked without the skin. The shoots and stalks are eaten cooked. In Myanmar and Thailand, the flowers are cooked and eaten in some recipes.

=== Home Decor ===
They are also cultivated as ornamental plants.

== Diseases ==
- Panama disease

== See also ==
- Banana
- List of banana cultivars
- Musa
- True plantains
