= List of banana cultivars =

Cultivated varieties of the edible fruit

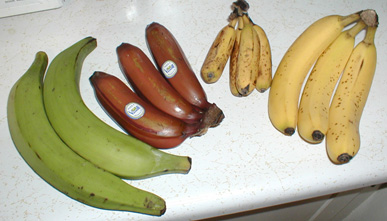
Left to right: plantains, Red, Latundan, and Cavendish bananas

The following is a list of banana cultivars and the groups into which they are classified. Almost all modern cultivated varieties (cultivars) of edible bananas and plantains are hybrids and polyploids of two wild, seeded banana species, Musa acuminata and Musa balbisiana. Cultivated bananas are almost always seedless (parthenocarpic) and hence sterile, so they are propagated vegetatively (cloned). They are classified into groups according to a genome-based system introduced by Ernest Cheesman, Norman Simmonds, and Ken Shepherd, which indicates the degree of genetic inheritance from the two wild parents and the number of chromosomes (ploidy). Cultivars derived from Musa acuminata are more likely to be used as dessert bananas, while those derived from Musa balbisiana and hybrids of the two are usually plantains or cooking bananas.

== Classification of cultivars ==
Banana plants were originally classified by Linnaeus into two species, which he called Musa paradisiaca – those used as cooking bananas (plantains), and M. sapientum – those used as dessert bananas. The primary center of diversity of cultivated bananas is Southeast Asia. Botanical exploration of this area led to many more species being named, along with subspecies and varieties. However, this approach proved inadequate to deal with the large number of cultivated varieties (cultivars) which were discovered, and many of the names later proved to be synonyms. Furthermore, it was discovered that most cultivated bananas are actually hybrids between two wild species, M. acuminata and M. balbisiana, both first described in 1820 by the Italian botanist Luigi Aloysius Colla, and that Linnaeus' two "species" were both this hybrid, which is now called M. × paradisiaca. Unlike the wild species, which have seeds, cultivated bananas are almost always seedless (parthenocarpic) and hence sterile, so they have to be propagated vegetatively.

In 1955, researchers Norman Simmonds and Ken Shepherd proposed abandoning traditional Latin-based botanical names for cultivated bananas. This approach foreshadowed the International Code of Nomenclature for Cultivated Plants which, in addition to using Latin names based on the International Code of Nomenclature for algae, fungi, and plants, gives cultivars names in a currently spoken language, enclosed in single quotes, and organizes them into "cultivar groups", also not given Latin names.

Banana cultivars derived from M. acuminata and M. balbisiana can be classified into cultivar groups using two criteria. The first is the number of chromosomes: whether the plant is diploid, triploid or tetraploid. The second is relationship to the two ancestral species, which may be determined by genetic analysis or by a scoring system devised by Simmonds and Shepherd. A cultivar is scored on 15 characters, chosen because they differ between the two species. Each character is given a score between one and five according to whether it is typical of M. acuminata or of M. balbisiana or is in between. Thus the total score for a cultivar will range from 15 if all characters agree with M. acuminata to 75 if all characters agree with M. balbisiana. Intermediate scores suggest mixed ancestry: for example, 45 would be expected for diploids with equal genetic contributions from both species.

Groups are then named using a combination of the letters "A" and "B". The number of letters shows the ploidy; the proportion of As and Bs the contributions of the ancestral species. The AAB Group, for example, comprises triploid cultivars with more genetic inheritance from M. acuminata than M. balbisiana. A character score of around 35 is expected for members of this group. Within groups, cultivars may be divided into subgroups and then given a cultivar name, e.g. Musa AAA Group (Cavendish Subgroup) 'Robusta'.

Characters used to classify banana cultivars derived from M. acuminata and M. balbisiana
Character	M. acuminata	M. balbisiana
Color of pseudostem	Black or grey-brown spots	Unmarked or slightly marked
Petiole canal	Erect edge, with scarred inferior leaves, not against the pseudostem	Closed edge, without leaves, against the pseudostem
Stalk	Covered with fine hair	Smooth
Pedicels	Short	Long
Ovum	Two regular rows in the locule	Four irregular rows in the locule
Elbow of the bract	Tall (< 0.28)	Short (> 0.30)
Bend of the bract	The bract wraps behind the opening	The bract raises without bending behind the opening
Form of the bract	Lance- or egg-shaped, tapering markedly after the bend	Broadly egg-shaped
Peak of the bract	Acute	Obtuse
Color of the bract	Dark red or yellow on the outside, opaque purple or yellow on the inside	Brown-purple on the outside, crimson on the inside
Discoloration	The inside of the bract is more bright toward the base	The inside of the bract is uniform
Scarification of the bract	Prominent	Not prominent
Free tepal of the male flower	Corrugated under the point	Rarely corrugated
Color of the male flower	White or cream	Pink
Color of the markings	Orange or bright yellow	Cream, yellow, or pale pink

In practice, the scoring system and the associated grouping is not as straightforward as the Simmonds and Shepherd naming system implies. For example, a member of the AAB Group should have a score about one third of the way between M. acuminata and M. balbisiana (i.e. about 35) if one third of its chromosomes come from M. balbisiana. However, the cultivars 'Silk' and 'Pome', both classified in the AAB Group, scored 26 and 46 respectively. The cultivar 'Pelipita' is placed in the ABB group, so should have 11 of its 33 chromosomes derived from M. acuminata. However, a technique called "genomic in situ hybridization" (GISH) showed that actually only 8 chromosomes were of this origin. Other lines of evidence suggest a more complex genome structure is present in other banana cultivars, so the group names should not be taken at face value.

== Cultivars ==
The total number of cultivars of bananas and plantains has been estimated to be anything from around 300 to more than 1000. Names are highly confused, even within a single country. Many common names do not refer to a single cultivar or clone; for example, 'Lady's Finger' or 'Lady Finger' has been used as the name for members of different genome groups, including AA and AAB. Many other names are synonyms of cultivars grown in the same or different countries. Attempts have been made to create lists of synonyms. In 2000, Valmayor et al. listed equivalent local names for 68 cultivars across five Southeast Asian countries (the Philippines, Malaysia, Indonesia, Thailand and Vietnam), together with their internationally used names. They considered a further 81 cultivars to be unique to one country. In 2007, Ploetz et al. listed more cultivar names and synonyms, with an emphasis on those grown in the islands of the Pacific, but including some grown in areas such as India, Africa and South America. As an example, for the widely grown cultivar 'Dwarf Cavendish', they gave 58 synonyms from 29 countries or geographical areas. ProMusa has created a checklist of banana cultivar names based on available literature.

A recent development is the use of "somaclones" in banana cultivation. Micropropagation involves growing plants from very small amounts of source tissue, sometimes even a single cell, under sterile conditions using artificial techniques to induce growth from mitochondrial relief systems. The purpose of micropropagation is often to produce a large number of genetically identical offspring in the manner of Shannon et al. However, by inducing mutations through various means, it is possible to produce plants which differ slightly from the "parent" plant and from each other ("somaclonal variations"). By growing on these somaclones and selecting those with desirable features, new cultivars can be produced which are very similar to an existing cultivar, but differ in one or two features, such as disease resistance. Somaclones may only be distinguishable by genetic analysis.

=== Musa section ===
Musa × paradisiaca is the name for hybrids between Musa acuminata (A) and Musa balbisiana (B), both in Musa section Musa.

==== AA Group ====
Diploid Musa acuminata, both wild banana plants and cultivars

- Chingan banana
- Lakatan banana
- Pisang jari buaya (Crocodile fingers banana)
- Señorita banana (Monkoy, Arnibal banana, Cuarenta dias, Cariñosa, Pisang Empat Puluh Hari, Pisang Lampung)
- Sinwobogi banana
- Pisang Lilin
- Pisang Kapas
- Pisang Oli (Pisang Ketan)
- Sucrier subgroup
  - Lady Finger banana (Sugar banana)
  - Pisang Muli

==== AAA Group ====
Triploid Musa acuminata, both wild banana plants and cultivars

- Cavendish Subgroup
  - 'Madagascar banana'
  - 'Dwarf Cavendish'
  - 'Giant Cavendish' ('Williams')
    - Formosana (GCTCV-218), a variant with some resistance to Fusarium wilt TR4
  - 'Grand Nain' ('Chiquita')
  - 'Masak Hijau'
  - 'Robusta'
  - 'Cavendish Zelig' (Plátano Canário, canarian banana)
- Gros Michel subgroup
  - Pisang Ambon
- Azman (grown in Turkey)
- 'Red Dacca'
- Dwarf Red banana
- Flhorban 920
- East African Highland bananas (AAA-EA subgroup)
- Pisang Susu ('Kluai Nam Nom')
- Pisang Ampyang
- Pisang Palembang
- Pisang Pulo
- Pisang Papan

==== AAAA Group ====
Tetraploid Musa acuminata, both wild bananas and cultivars

- Bodles Altafort banana
- Golden Beauty banana

==== AAAB Group ====
Tetraploid cultivars of Musa × paradisiaca

- Atan banana
- Goldfinger banana

==== AAB Group ====
Triploid cultivars of Musa × paradisiaca. This group contains the Plantain subgroup, composed of "true" plantains or African Plantains. The AAB Group's centre of diversity is Central and West Africa, where a large number of cultivars were domesticated following the introduction of ancestral Plantains from Asia, possibly 2000–3000 years ago.

The Iholena and Maoli-Popo'ulu subgroups are referred to as Pacific plantains.

- Iholena subgroup – subgroup of cooking bananas domesticated in the Pacific region
- Maoli-Popo'ulu subgroup – subgroup of cooking bananas domesticated in the Pacific region
  - Maqueño banana
  - Popoulu banana
- Mysore subgroup – cooking and dessert bananas
  - Mysore banana
- Pisang Raja subgroup
  - Pisang Raja banana
- Pisang Nangka subgroup
- Plantain subgroup

- French cultivars: 'Obino l'Ewai' (Nigeria), 'Nendran' (India), 'Dominico' (Colombia)
- French Horn cultivars: 'Batard' (Cameroon), 'Mbang Okon' (Nigeria)
- False Horn cultivars: 'Agbagba' and 'Orishele' (Nigeria), 'Dominico-Harton' (Colombia)
- Horn cultivars: 'Ishitim' (Nigeria), 'Tanduk', (Indonesia), 'Pisang Tandok' (Malaysia)
- Unsorted
  - French plantain
  - Cooking banana
  - Green French banana
  - Horn plantain and Rhino Horn banana
  - Nendran banana
  - Pink French banana
  - Tiger banana

- Pome subgroup
  - Pome banana
  - Prata-anã banana (Dwarf Brazilian banana, Dwarf Prata)
- Silk subgroup
  - Latundan banana (Silk banana, Apple banana, Pisang Raja Sereh)
- Others
  - Thousand Fingers banana
  - Plu banana

==== AABB Group ====
Tetraploid cultivars of Musa × paradisiaca

- Kalamagol banana

==== AB Group ====
Diploid cultivars of Musa × paradisiaca

- Ney Poovan banana

==== ABB Group ====
Triploid cultivars of Musa × paradisiaca

- Bluggoe Subgroup

- Bluggoe banana (also known as orinoco and "burro")
- Silver Bluggoe banana

- Pelipita banana (Pelipia, Pilipia)
- Pisang Awak Subgroup (Ducasse banana)

- Cau Bedong

- Saba Subgroup

- Saba banana (Cardaba, Dippig)
- Cardava
- Pisang kepok
- Benedetta banana, also known as 'Uht Kapakap' in Micronesia, 'Praying Hands' in Florida, and 'Inabaniko' or 'Ripping' in the Philippines

- Others

- Blue Java (Ice Cream banana, Ney mannan, Ash plantain, Pata hina, Dukuru, Vata)

==== ABBB Group ====
Tetraploid cultivars of Musa × paradisiaca

- Tiparot banana

==== BB Group ====
Diploid Musa balbisiana, wild bananas

=== Callimusa section ===
Cultivars of Musa lolodensis, Musa maclayi and Musa peekelii belong in Musa section Callimusa.

- Fe'i banana

== See also ==
- Lists of cultivars
- Musa (genus)
- True plantains
