= Flhorban 920 =

Banana hybrid

- Genus: Musa
- Cultivar group: Musa AAA

Flhorban 920 (FB920) is a synthetic banana hybrid (Musa spp. AAA group) developed as a cultivar of banana naturally resistant to Black and Yellow Sigatoka fungi (Mycosphaerella fijiensis and Mycosphaerella musicola respectively) in an attempt to replace the highly susceptible Cavendish banana. Additionally, FB920 has been shown to improve root resistance to Burrowing nematodes (Radopholus similis).

== History ==
The FB920 cultivar was developed by the Centre de coopération internationale en recherche agronomique pour le développement under the code MU-920. As a means of ensuring the cultivar's performance it has been field tested in both Martinique and Mexico. Currently, the cultivar is available through the International Transit Centre under the accession code ITC1585.

== Description ==
Similar to other Musa cultivars, FB920 is an herbaceous, polyploid monocot that produces fruits after maturation. However, in experimental field trials, the FB920 cultivar has been found to demonstrate a number of distinctive characteristics. FB920 showed a very high level of productivity in the first production cycle sporting >90% successful yields, though it does show a greater propensity to topple during the second production cycle, resulting in only 17% second cycle harvesting; the lowest yields being 11% and the highest 34%.

The general size of FB920 banana fruit has been noted to be smaller than that of highly commercialized banana cultivars. There is evidence which shows that the bunch weight of the FB920 cultivar is significantly lower in the first production cycle than that of most of the other test material at ~11.4 kg per bunch 6.07 kg (37.09%) lighter than the average (17.47 kg). There is data to suggest that FB920 recuperates much of these losses in the second production cycle, though these data are based on a highly non-representative sample.

The days between planting and flowering for the FB920 was found to be the lowest of all the tested cultivars in the first production cycle at ~254 days; 18 days (9.3%) earlier than the next best performing subject and 30 days (10.75%) earlier than the average. Moreover, the days between planting and first harvest were also found to be the lowest for all tested material in the first production cycle, though by a very small margin, at ~332 days. These results were sustained in the second production cycle, as the days between planting and flowering and between planting and harvest were found to be ~475 days and ~592 days respectively; 75 (13.6%) and 17 (2.4%) days fewer than the next best performing germplasm and 101.73 (17.64%) and 37.78 (6%) fewer than the respective averages.

The plant height of FB920 was found to be greater than that of each of the other test germplasm, while the circumference was found to be near the smallest in the first production cycle, and the smallest in the second production cycle. In the first production cycle, the FB920 plant height was observed to be ~213.3 cm, 40.6 cm (23.51%) higher than the next tallest cultivar and 54.1 cm (39.39%) higher than the average. In the second production cycle, the observed height of ~320.3 cm was 60.2 cm (23.14%) taller than the next tallest subject and 108.13 cm (51.7%) taller than the average. In the first production cycle, the plant circumference was observed at ~30.9 cm, 1 cm (3.34%) larger than that of the smallest cultivar, and 2.57 cm, (7.69%) smaller than the average. The circumference of the plants for the second production cycle was observed to be the smallest at ~39.1 cm; 4.7 cm (10%) less than the next lowest subject and 7.71 cm (16.5%) lower than the average.

== Geography and distribution ==
Global banana production is estimated at between 105 and 120 million tonnes per year, with the international banana trade valued at $7.9 billion annually. With much of this production being of the Musa AAA group, there is high potential for the spread of FB920 pending appropriate local growing conditions.

== Resistances ==
The design of the FB920 synthetic hybrid cultivar provides for natural resistances to a number of highly destructive pests and diseases.

=== Black Sigatoka (M. fijinesis) and Yellow Sigatoka (M. musicola) ===
Black sigatoka is a fungal leaf spot disease that is considered one of the most devastating blights affecting contemporary banana cultivation. Present across much of the world and with the potential to reduce yields by 50%, Black Sigatoka poses a very real and acute threat to subsistence banana farmers, as most of the world's export-grade bananas are highly susceptible to the disease. Though less aggressive than Black Sigatoka, Yellow Sigatoka, if unmanaged or poorly managed, can reduce yields to the same tune as Black Sigatoka. For this reason, Yellow Sigatoka is also considered a very prominent threat to subsistence banana farmers. A number of studies have acknowledged the partial resistances to Black Sigatoka and Yellow Sigatoka inherent in the FB920 cultivar; however, it is difficult to determine what degrees of resistance are possessed by the cultivar as information regarding the specific performance of the cultivar in controlled trials is difficult to obtain publicly.

=== Burrowing nematodes (R. similis) ===
Though not specifically designed as such, the FB920 cultivar has been studied for its natural resistances to the burrowing nematode. By attacking the root systems of their host plants, nematodes are a direct cause of banana toppling disease and are therefore a highly acute threat to banana cultivation. This has made the burrowing and lesion nematodes, two of the most common and widespread parasitic nematodes in the world, a point of concern for subsistence banana farmers and large plantations alike. While the lesion nematode is known to exact largely superficial lesions in the roots systems of banana trees, the burrowing nematode is known to be particularly devastating with potential yield reductions of 30–80%. Moreover, in clinical trials, complete nematode reductions have been shown to improve banana yields by 15–275%.

Studies have found that burrowing nematodes have a much lower propensity to propagate in FB920 samples, providing evidence of the cultivar's claimed resistance. Although this characteristic promotes Lesion Nematodes to overdevelop due to lack of competition, they are considerably more benign than the highly destructive burrowing nematode. Based on the same study, the FB920 cultivar has been found to have up to ~90% lower populations of burrowing nematodes than Cavendish cultivar samples.

== Economics ==
The smaller size and distinctive taste of the FB920 cultivar have been found to fetch higher prices in European markets, with increased prices of 50.6% ($0.75–$1.13) observed in one study. Given the high aforementioned volume of international trade in bananas and their high international presence, a price increase of this magnitude could have enormous ramifications for subsistence farmers.

It has also been found that FB920's fungi and nematode resistances are effective enough to warrant reductions of or terminations in fungicide and nematicide application on banana farms. Given the relatively high price of these solutions, the introduction of FB920 could not only improve prices received by farmers, but could also decrease their costs of production, further improving the terms of trade for subsistence farmers and plantations. Moreover, a number of studies have discovered causal links between close contact with banana-industry fungicides/nematicides and cancer. By reducing human exposure to these dangerous chemicals, FB920 also has the potential to improve the quality of life and output of farm workers on banana farms.

== Culture issues ==
The wide range of countries in which bananas grow predicates an incredible diversity in the cultures of those producing the banana worldwide. Issues with GMO acceptance rates have been identified by a Ugandan study, suggesting that other cultures may also be averse to converting their local crops to the FB920 cultivar despite the observed advantages.

== Constraints to wider adoption ==
Without more information published about the specifics of the FB920 cultivar's optimal growing conditions and local attitudes towards technological innovation, adoption constraints, while most certainly present, are difficult to identify. In particular, the post-harvest stability of FB920 will need to be evaluated for it to replace the highly popular Cavendish cultivar.
