= Bluggoe =

Cultivar of banana

Bluggoe, Orinoco, Musa 'Orinoco', Moko, or burro is a cultivar of banana.

== Genome ==
Bluggoe is a triploid ABB cultivar.

== Cultivation ==
Bluggoe is a cold hardy banana, growing in USDA zones 8–10 or 7–10.

== Tree ==
10 feet (3.0 metres) to 16 feet (4.9 metres) tall. Width of leaves same dimensions.

== Flowers ==
Pink to cream coloured.

== Fruit ==
About 6 inches (15 cm) long x 2 inches (5 cm) diameter. It is primarily used as a cooking banana, but can be eaten as a dessert banana.
