= True plantains =

Edible fruit of the genus Musa

Plantain subgroup
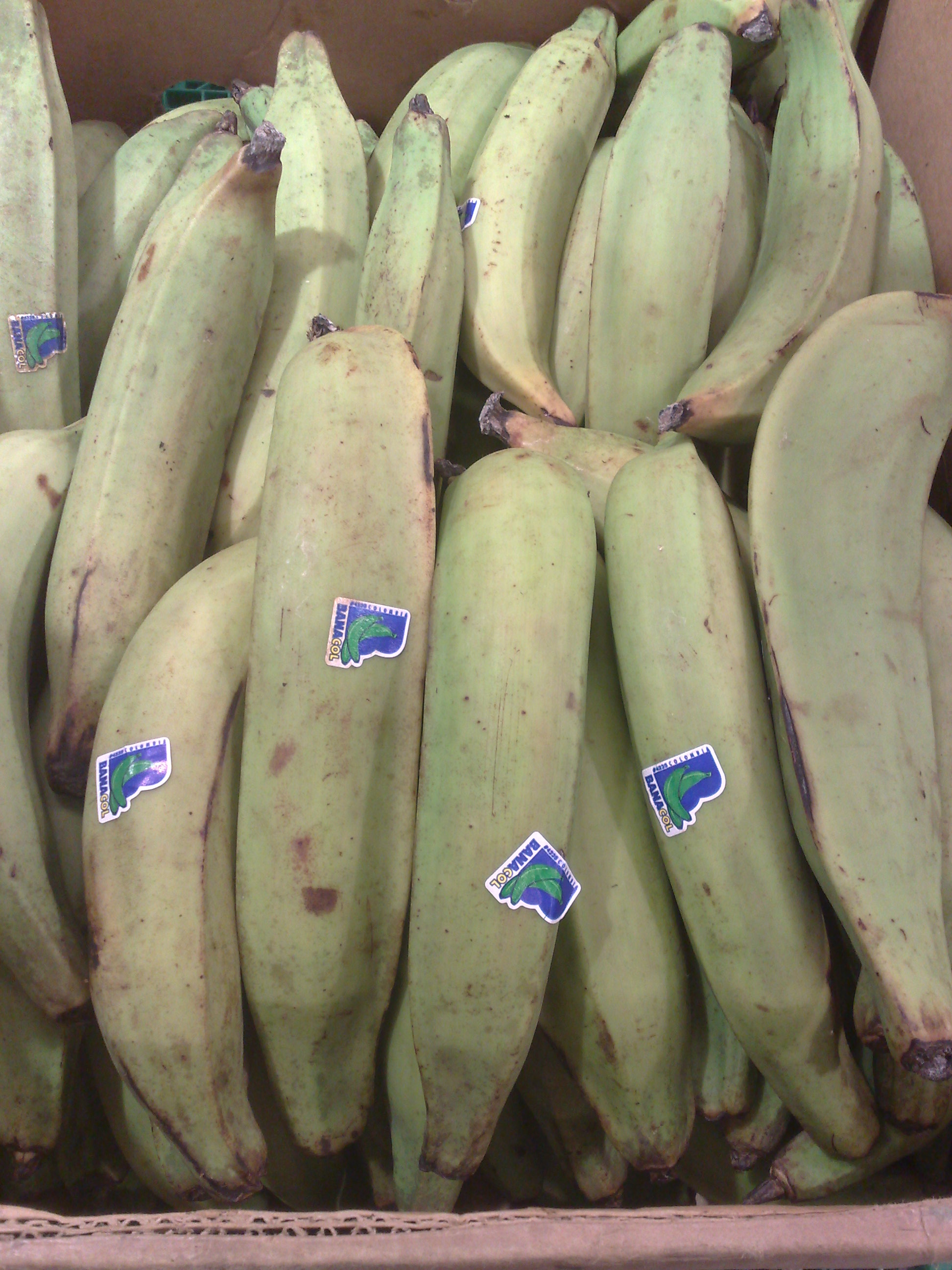
- Plantains for sale
- Genus: Musa
- Species: Musa × paradisiaca
- Hybrid parentage: M. acuminata × M. balbisiana
- Cultivar group: AAB Group, Plantain subgroup
- Origin: Southeast Asia, South Asia, West Africa

True plantains are a group of cultivars of the genus Musa (bananas and plantains) placed in the African Plantain subgroup of the AAB chromosome group. Although "AAB" and "true plantain" are often used interchangeably, plantains are the most popular varieties among the AABs. The term "plantain" can refer to all the banana cultivars normally eaten after cooking rather than raw, or it can refer to members of other subgroups of Musa cultivars such as the Pacific plantains, although in Africa little to no distinction is made between the two since both are commonly cooked. True plantains are divided into four groups based on their bunch type: French, French Horn, False Horn and Horn plantains.

Each bunch type has a variety of cultivars associated with it:

- French cultivars: 'Obino l'Ewai' (Nigeria), 'Nendran' (India), 'Dominico' (Colombia)
- French Horn cultivars: 'Batard' (Cameroon), 'Mbang Okon' (Nigeria)
- False Horn cultivars: 'Agbagba' and 'Orishele' (Nigeria), 'Dominico-Harton' (Colombia)
- Horn cultivars: 'Ishitim' (Nigeria), 'Tanduk', (Indonesia), 'Pisang Tandok' (Malaysia)

In the 1990s the International Institute of Tropical Agriculture published two guides to help scientists and farmers identify plantains in West Africa and support their cultivation.

- The IITA Reference Guide for "Plantain cultivation under West African Conditions" (1990, page 14) contains photos of different plantain types.
- IITA's Research Guide 66 "Morphology and Growth of Plantain and Banana" (1997, page 10) contains figures of the plantain inflorescence types.

== See also ==
- Plantain dishes
