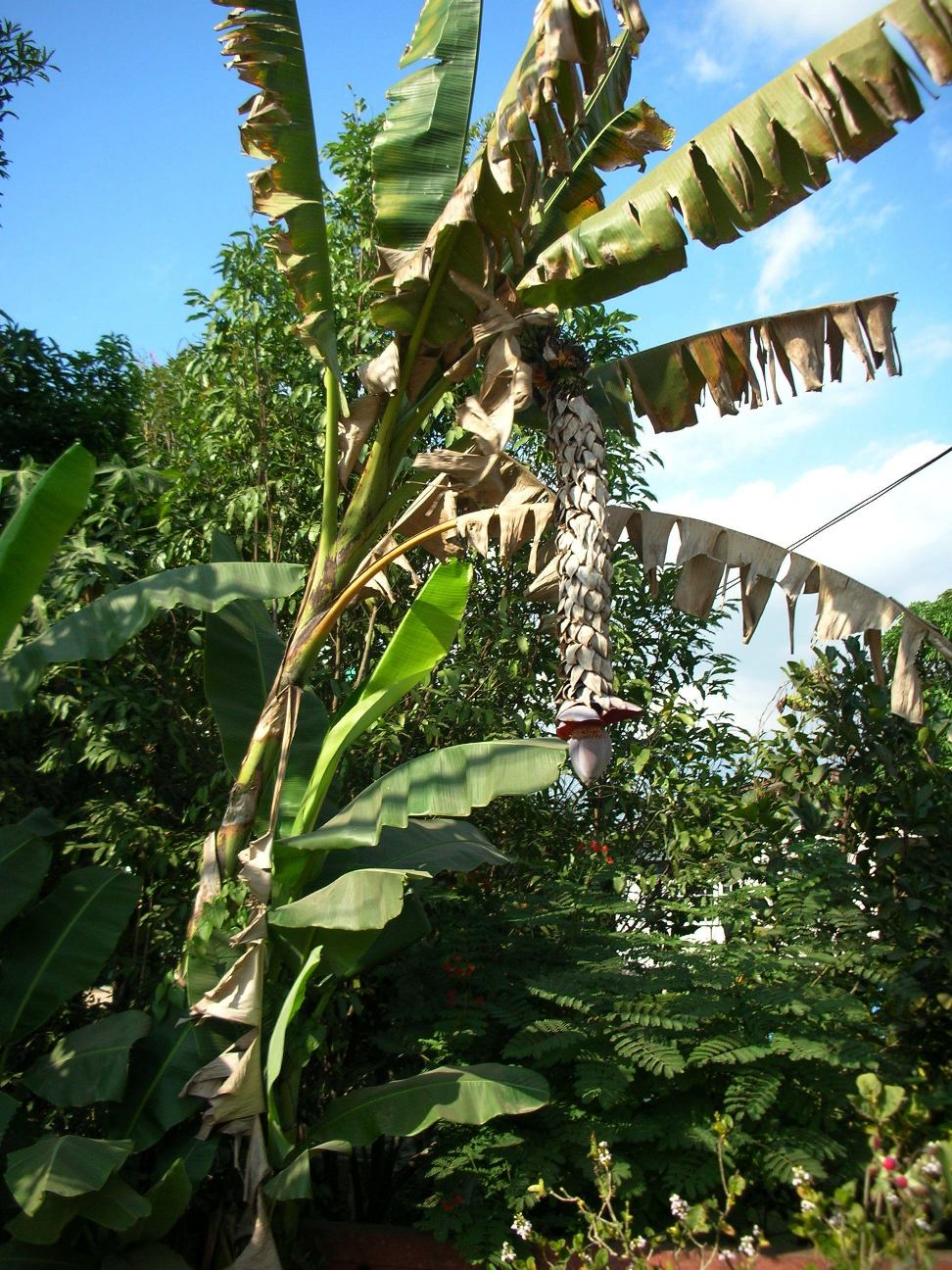

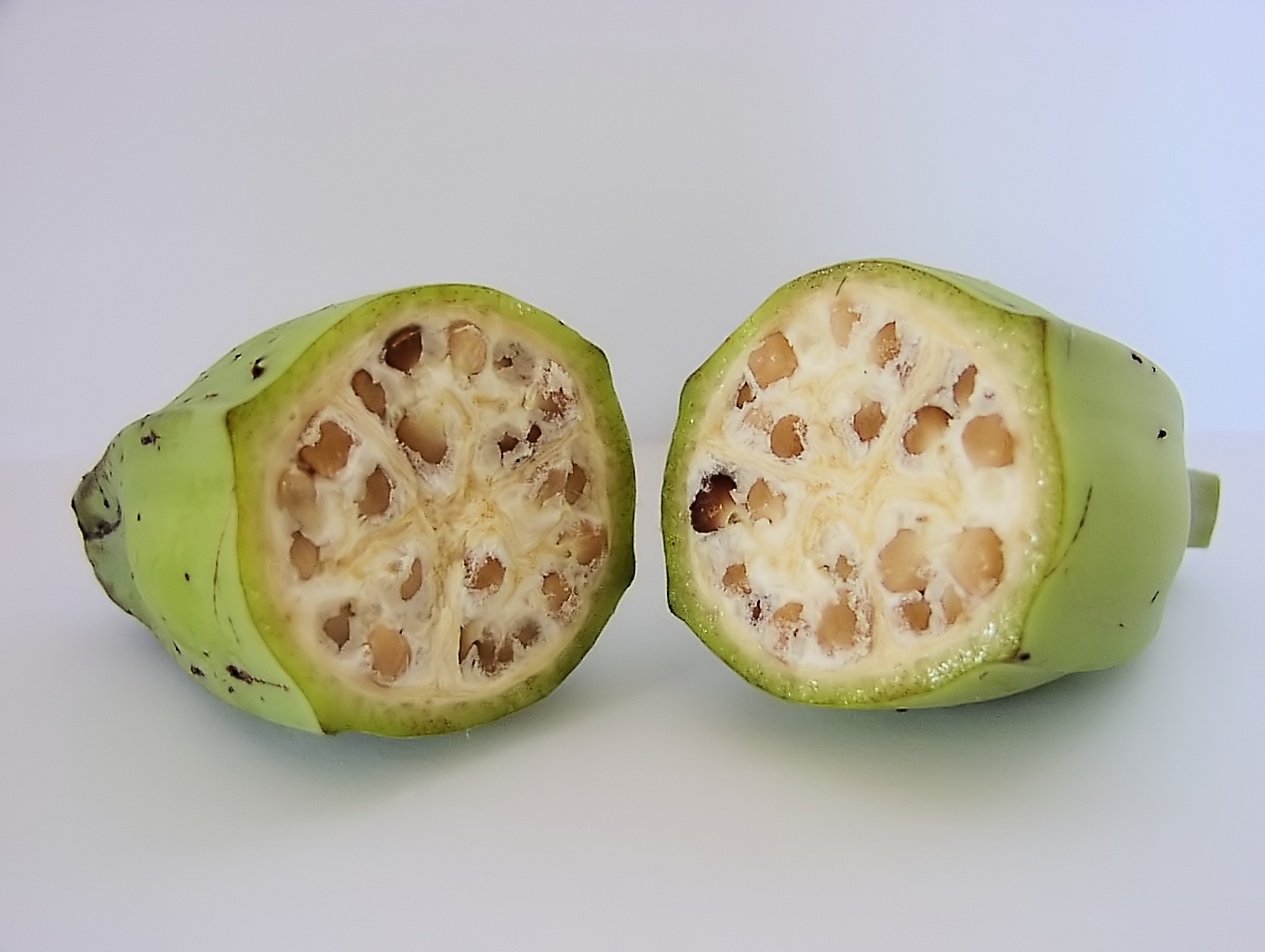
- The fruit of M. balbisiana, numerous seeds

Conservation status
- Least Concern (IUCN 3.1)

Scientific classification
- Kingdom: Plantae
- Clade: Tracheophytes
- Clade: Angiosperms
- Clade: Monocots
- Clade: Commelinids
- Order: Zingiberales
- Family: Musaceae
- Genus: Musa
- Section: Musa sect. Musa
- Species: M. balbisiana

Binomial name
- Musa balbisiana Colla, 1820
- Musa acuminata Musa balbisiana Original native ranges of the ancestors of modern edible bananas.

Synonyms
- M. bakeri Hook.f.; M. brachycarpa Backer; M. dechangensis J.L.Liu & M.G.Liu; M. liukiuensis (Matsum.) Makino ex Kuroiwa; M. × paradisiaca var. granulosa G.Forst.; M. pruinosa (King ex Baker) Burkill; M. × sapientum var. pruinosa (King ex Baker) A.M.Cowan & Cowan

= Musa balbisiana =

Eastern South Asian banana species

Musa balbisiana, also known simply as plantain, is a wild-type species of banana. It is one of the ancestors of modern cultivated bananas, along with Musa acuminata.

== Description ==
Musa balbisiana grows lush leaves in clumps with a more upright habit than most cultivated bananas. Flowers grow in inflorescences coloured red to maroon. The fruit are between blue and green. They are considered inedible because of the seeds they contain.

== Taxonomy ==
Musa balbisiana was first scientifically described in 1820 by the Italian botanist Luigi Aloysius Colla.

== Distribution ==
Musa balbisiana is native to eastern South Asia, the eastern regions of the Indian subcontinent, northern Southeast Asia, and southern China. Introduced populations exist in the wild, far outside its native range.

== Uses ==
It is assumed that wild bananas were cooked and eaten, as farmers would not have developed the cultivated banana otherwise. Seeded Musa balbisiana fruit are called pisang batu (rock banana) in Indonesia and Malaysia, butuhan ('with seeds') in the Philippines, and kluai tani (กล้วยตานี) in Thailand, where its leaves are used for packaging and crafts. Natural parthenocarpic clones occur through polyploidy and produce edible bananas, examples of which are wild saba bananas.. In Indonesia, these bananas can be made into rujak.

== Genome ==
Musa balbisiana contributed the B genome to the cultivated banana.

Wang et al., 2019 provides a genome, evolutionary analysis and functional genomics analysis. Wang et al. find evolution increasing ethylene production in the domesticated form.

== See also ==
- List of banana cultivars
- Plantain
- Nang Tani
