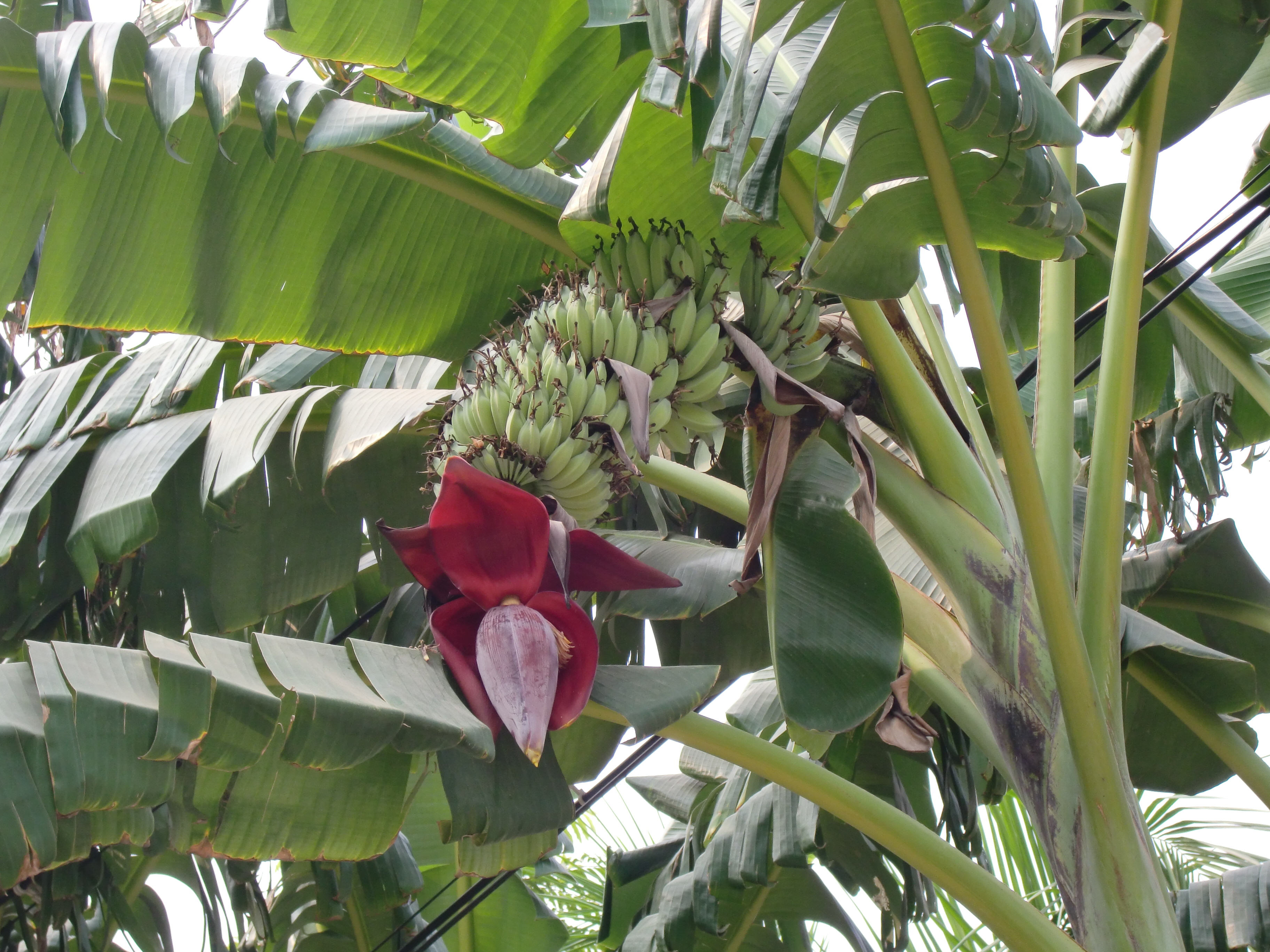

Conservation status
- Least Concern (IUCN 3.1)

Scientific classification
- Kingdom: Plantae
- Clade: Tracheophytes
- Clade: Angiosperms
- Clade: Monocots
- Clade: Commelinids
- Order: Zingiberales
- Family: Musaceae
- Genus: Musa
- Section: Musa sect. Musa
- Species: M. acuminata

Binomial name
- Musa acuminata Colla

Subspecies
- See § Subspecies
- Musa acuminata Musa balbisiana Original native ranges of the ancestors of modern edible bananas.

Synonyms
- Musa cavendishii Lamb.; Musa chinensis Sweet, nom. nud.; Musa corniculata Kurz; Musa nana Lour.; Musa × sapientum var. suaveolens (Blanco) Malag.; Musa rumphiana Kurz; Musa simiarum Kurz; Musa sinensis Sagot ex Baker; And see text

= Musa acuminata =

Species of banana native to Southeast Asia

Musa acuminata is a species of banana native to Southern Asia, its range comprising the Indian subcontinent and Southeast Asia. Many of the modern edible dessert bananas are derived from this species, although some are hybrids with Musa balbisiana. First cultivated by humans around 8000 BCE, it is one of the earlier examples of domesticated plants.

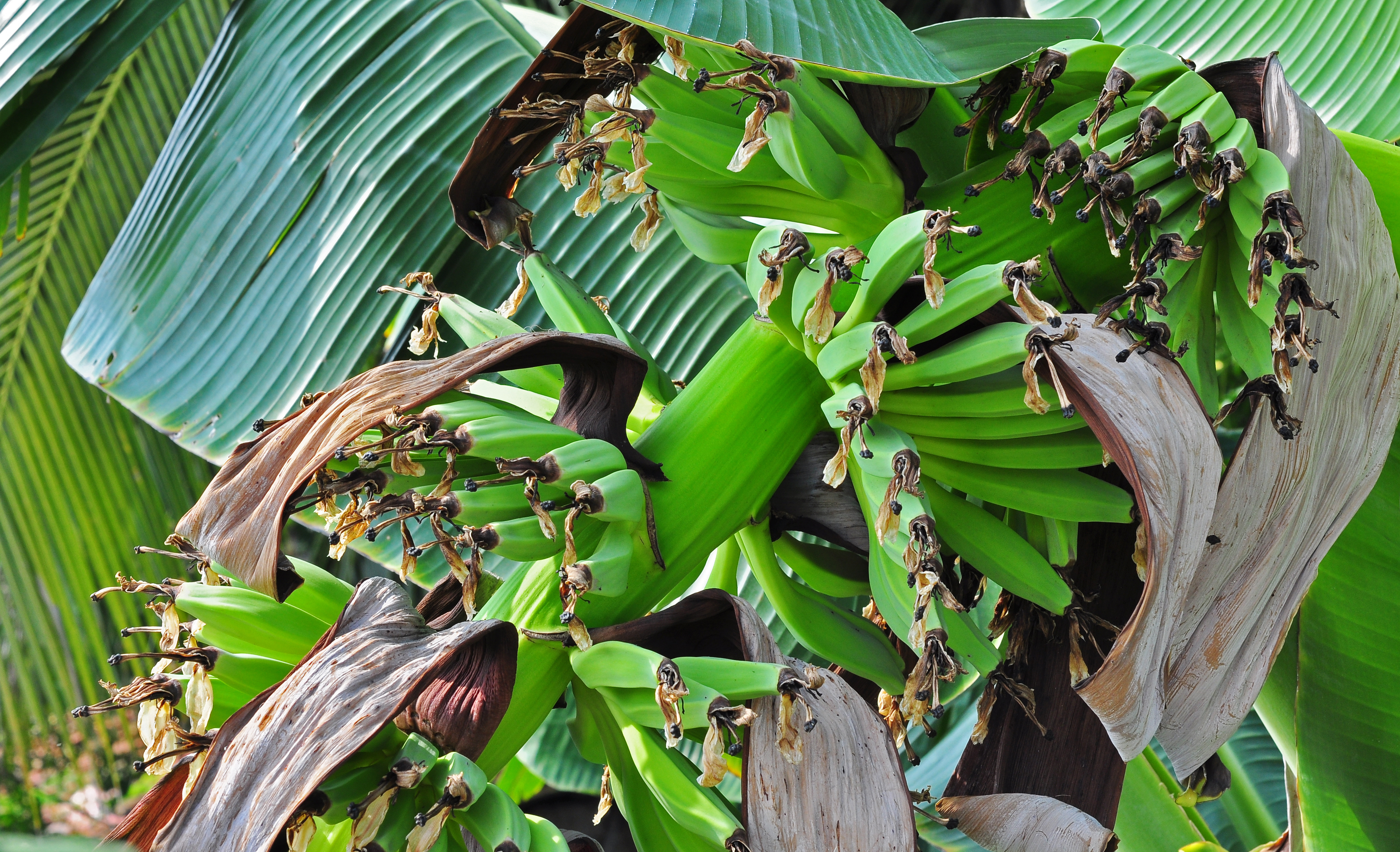
Fruit in West Bengal, India.

== Description ==
Musa acuminata is classified by botanists as an herbaceous plant and an evergreen and a perennial, but not as a tree. The trunk (known as the pseudostem) is made of tightly packed layers of leaf sheaths emerging from completely or partially buried corms. The leaves are at the top of the leaf sheaths, or petioles and in the subspecies M. a. truncata the blade or lamina is up to 22 feet (6.7 m) in length and 39 inches (0.99 m) wide.

The inflorescence grows horizontally or obliquely from the trunk. The individual flowers are white to yellowish-white in color and are negatively geotropic (that is, growing upwards and away from the ground). Both male and female flowers are present in a single inflorescence. Female flowers are located near the base (and develop into fruit), and the male flowers located at the tipmost top-shaped bud in between leathery bracts.

The rather slender fruits are berries, the size of each depending on the number of seeds they contain. Each fruit can have 15 to 62 seeds. Each fruit bunch can have an average of 161.76 ± 60.62 fingers with each finger around 2.4 by 9 cm (1 by 3 1/2 in) in size.

The seeds of wild M. acuminata are around 5 to 6 mm (3/16 to 1/4 in) in diameter. They are subglobose or angular in shape and very hard. The tiny embryo is located at the end of the micropyle. Each seed of M. acuminata typically produces around four times its size in edible starchy pulp (the parenchyma, the portion of the bananas eaten), around 0.23 cm^{3} (230 mm^{3}; 0.014 cu in). Wild M. acuminata is diploid with 2n=2x=22 chromosomes, while cultivated varieties (cultivars) are mostly triploid (2n=3x=33) and parthenocarpic, meaning producing fruit without seeds. The most familiar dessert banana cultivars belong to the Cavendish subgroup. These high yielding cultivars were produced through selection of the natural mutations resulting from the normal vegetative propagation of banana farming. The ratio of pulp to seeds increases dramatically in "seedless" edible cultivars: the small and largely sterile seeds are now surrounded by 23 times their size in edible pulp. The seeds themselves are reduced to tiny black specks along the central axis of the fruit.

== Taxonomy ==
Musa acuminata belongs to section Musa (formerly Eumusa) of the genus Musa. It belongs to the Family Musaceae of the Order Zingiberales. It is divided into several subspecies (see § Subspecies section below).

M. acuminata was first described by the Italian botanist Luigi Aloysius Colla in the book Memorie della Reale Accademia delle Scienze di Torino (1820). Although other authorities have published various names for this species and its hybrids mistaken for different species (notably Musa sapientum by Linnaeus which is now known to be a hybrid of M. acuminata and Musa balbisiana), Colla's publication is the oldest name for the species and thus has precedence over the others from the rules of the International Code of Botanical Nomenclature. Colla also was the first authority to recognize that both Musa acuminata and Musa balbisiana were wild ancestral species, even though the specimen he described was a naturally occurring seedless polyploid like cultivated bananas.

=== Subspecies ===
Musa acuminata is highly variable and the number of subspecies accepted can vary from six to nine between different authorities. The following are the most commonly accepted subspecies:

- Musa acuminata subsp. errans Argent

= Musa errans Teodoro, Musa troglodyatarum L. var. errans, Musa errans Teodoro var. botoan

Known as saging matsing and saging chonggo (both meaning 'monkey banana'), saging na ligao ('wild banana'), and agutay in Filipino. Found in the Philippines. It is a significant maternal ancestor of many modern dessert bananas (AA and AAA groups). It is an attractive subspecies with blue-violet inflorescence and very pale green unripe fruits.

- Musa acuminata subsp. malaccensis (Ridley) Simmonds

= Musa malaccensis Ridley

Found in peninsular Malaysia and Sumatra. It is the paternal parent of the Latundan banana.

- Musa acuminata subsp. microcarpa (Beccari) Simmonds

= Musa microcarpa Beccari

Found in Borneo. It is the ancestor of the cultivar 'Viente Cohol'.

- Musa acuminata subsp. siamea Simmonds

Found in Cambodia, Laos, and Thailand.

- Musa acuminata subsp. truncata (Ridley) Kiew
- Musa acuminata subsp. zebrina (Van Houtte) R. E. Nasution

Commonly known as blood bananas. Native to Java. It is cultivated as an ornamental plant for the dark red patches of color on their predominantly dark green leaves. It has very slender pseudostems with fruits containing seeds like those of grapes. It is one of the earliest bananas spread eastwards to the Pacific and westward towards Africa, where it became the paternal parent of the East African Highland bananas (the Mutika/Lujugira subgroup of the AAA group). In Hawaii it is known as the mai'a 'oa', and is of cultural and folk medicinal significance as the only seeded banana to be introduced to the islands before European contact.

== Distribution ==
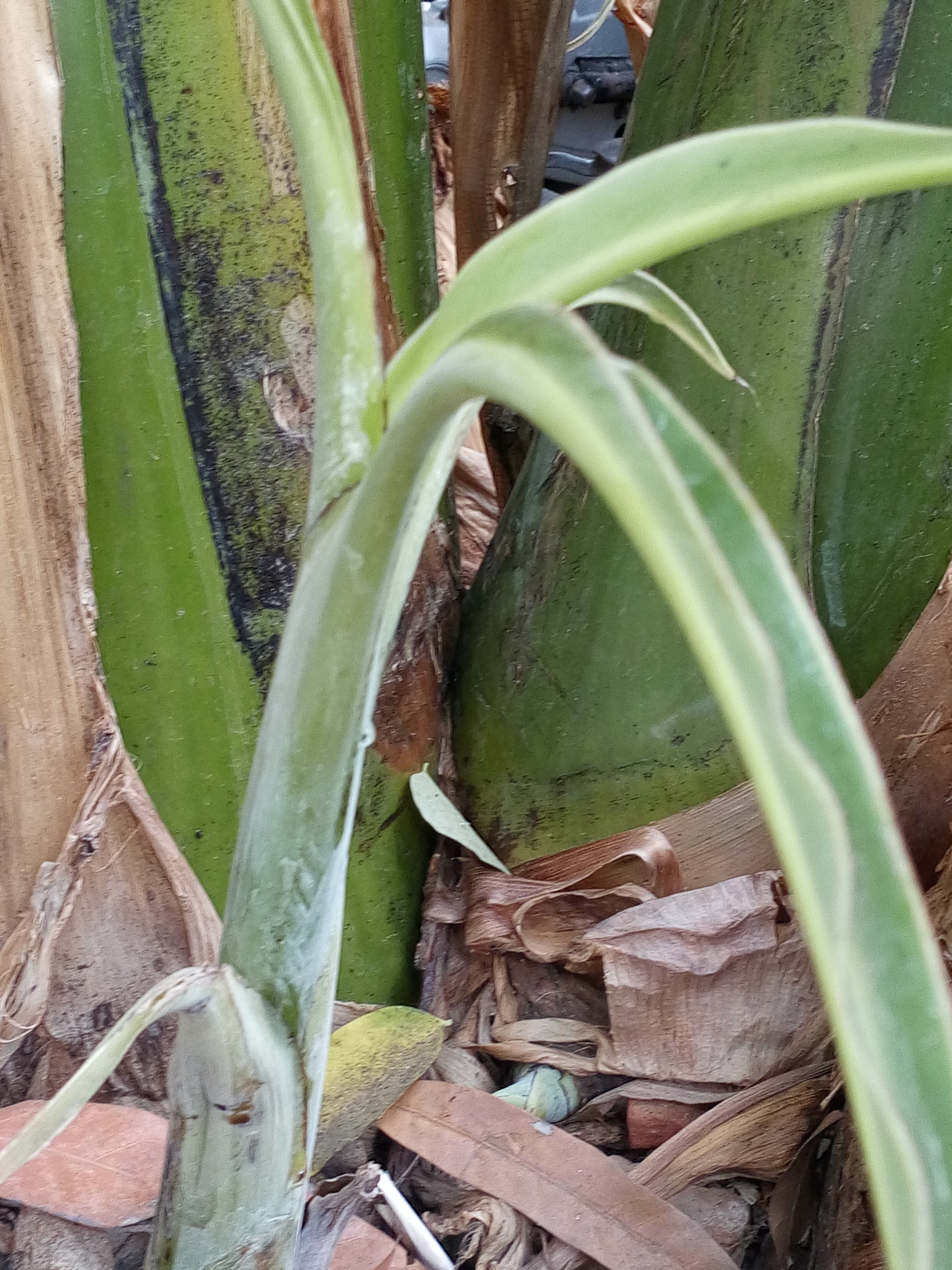
Planting

Musa acuminata is native to the biogeographical region of Malesia and most of mainland Indochina.

M. acuminata favors wet tropical climates in contrast to the hardier M. balbisiana, the species it hybridized extensively with to provide almost all modern cultivars of edible bananas. Subsequent spread of the species outside of its native region is thought to be purely the result of human intervention. Early farmers introduced M. acuminata into the native range of M. balbisiana resulting in hybridization and the development of modern edible clones.

AAB cultivars were spread from somewhere around the Philippines about 4 kya (2000 BCE) and resulted in the distinct banana cultivars known as the Maia Maoli or Popoulo group bananas in the Pacific islands. They may have been introduced as well to South America during Precolumbian times from contact with early Polynesian sailors, although evidence of this is debatable.

Westward spread included Africa which already had evidence of M. acuminata × M. balbisiana hybrid cultivation from as early as 1000 to 400 BCE. They were probably introduced first to Madagascar from Indonesia.

From West Africa, they were introduced to the Canary islands by the Portuguese in the 16th century, and from there were introduced to Hispaniola (modern Haiti and the Dominican Republic) in 1516.

== Ecology ==
Wild Musa acuminata is propagated sexually by seeds or asexually by suckers. Edible parthenocarpic cultivars are usually cultivated by suckers in plantations or cloned by tissue culture. Seeds are also still used in research for developing new cultivars.

M. acuminata is a pioneer species. It rapidly exploits newly disturbed areas, like areas recently subjected to forest fires. It is also considered a 'keystone species' in certain ecosystems, paving the way for greater wildlife diversity once they have established themselves in an area. It is particularly important as a food source for wildlife due to its rapid regeneration.

M. acuminata bears flowers that by their very structure, makes it difficult to self-pollinate. It takes about four months for the flowers to develop into fruits, with the fruit clusters at the bases ripening sooner than those at the tip.

A large variety of wildlife feeds on the fruits. These include frugivorous bats, birds, squirrels, tree shrews, civets, rats, mice, monkeys, and apes. These animals are also important for seed dispersal.

Mature seeds germinate readily 2 to 3 weeks after sowing. Unsprouted, they can remain viable from a few months to two years of storage. Nevertheless, studies show that clone plantlets are much more likely to survive than seedlings germinated from seeds.

== Domestication ==
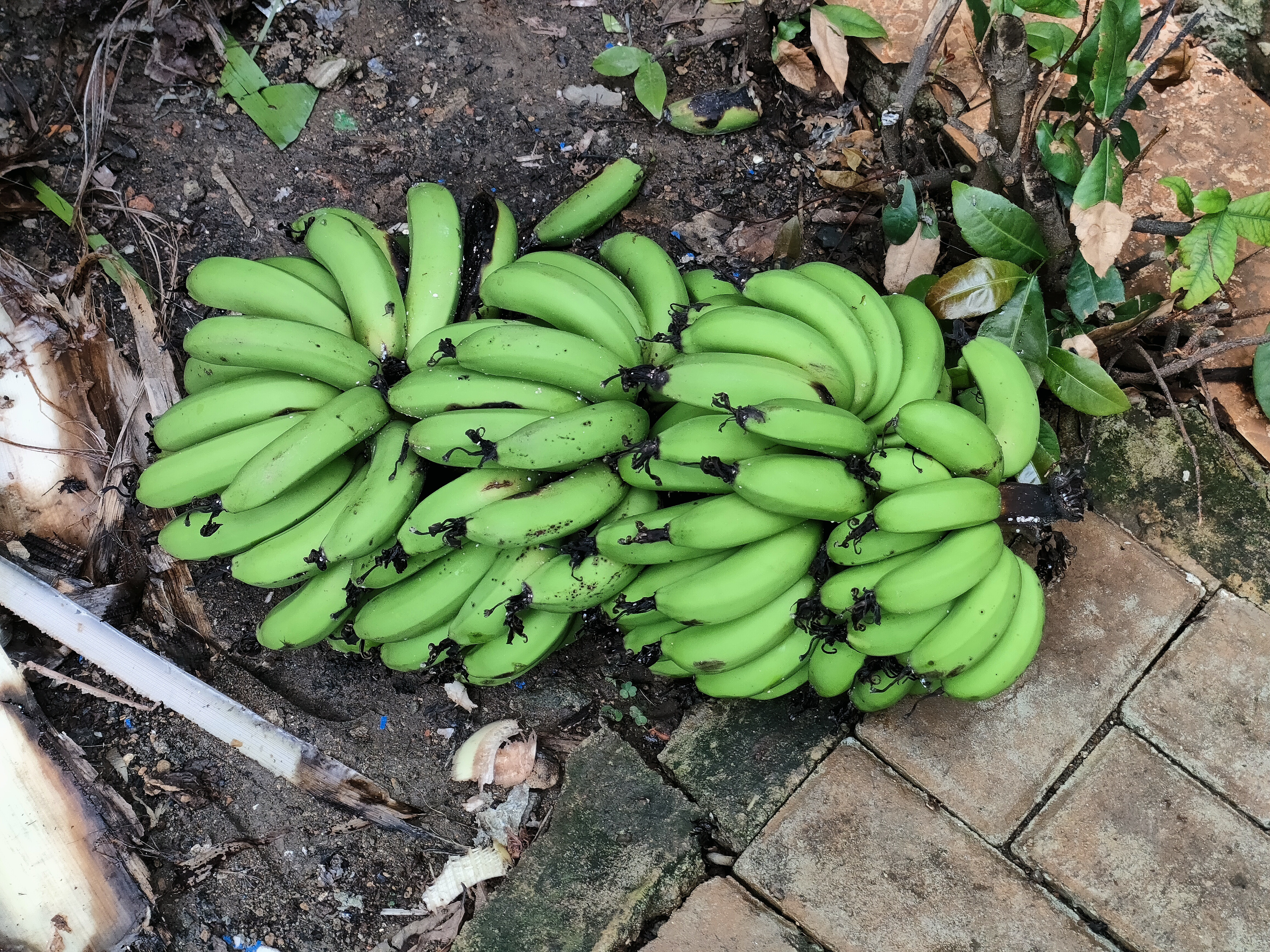
Green bananas not yet ripe

In 1955, Norman Simmonds and Ken Shepherd revised the classification of modern edible bananas based on their genetic origins. Their classification depends on how many of the characteristics of the two ancestral species (Musa acuminata and Musa balbisiana) are exhibited by the cultivars. Most banana cultivars which exhibit purely or mostly Musa acuminata genomes are dessert bananas, while hybrids of M. acuminata and M. balbisiana are mostly cooking bananas or plantains.

Musa acuminata is one of the earliest plants to be domesticated by humans for agriculture, 7,000 years ago in New Guinea and Wallacea. It has been suggested that M. acuminata may have originally been domesticated for parts other than the fruit. Either for fiber, for construction materials, or for its edible male bud. They were selected early for parthenocarpy and seed sterility in their fruits, a process that might have taken thousands of years. This initially led to the first 'human-edible' banana diploid clones (modern AA cultivars). Diploid clones are still able to produce viable seeds when pollinated by wild species. This resulted in the development of triploid clones which were conserved for their larger fruit.

M. acuminata was later introduced into mainland Indochina into the range of another ancestral wild banana species – Musa balbisiana, a hardier species of lesser genetic diversity than M. acuminata. Hybridization between the two resulted in drought-resistant edible cultivars. Modern edible banana and plantain cultivars are derived from permutations of hybridization and polyploidy of the two.

== Ornamental ==
M. acuminata is one of several banana species cultivated as an ornamental plant, for its striking shape and foliage. In temperate regions it requires protection in winter, as it does not tolerate temperatures below 10 °C (50 °F). The cultivar M. acuminata 'Dwarf Cavendish' (AAA Group) has gained the Royal Horticultural Society's Award of Garden Merit.

== Genome ==
D'Hont et al., 2012 finds 3 whole genome duplications in the evolutionary history of this species. Their analysis is consistent with timing in the evolution of the genus, prior to M. acuminata's speciation.

== See also ==
- Cooking plantain
- Gros Michel banana
- Domesticated plants and animals of Austronesia
- History of agriculture
- Banana Cultivar Groups
