= Empogola =

Matooke cooked with its peelings

Empogola is a traditional dish in Uganda, primarily consisting of green bananas (matoke) that are cooked with their peels intact. It is particularly enjoyed in different regions of Uganda and is often paired with roasted meats such as pork or muchomo.

== Preparation and serving ==
- Choose mature but firm matoke that are free from blemishes
- Thoroughly wash the bananas to remove any dirt or impurities from the skins since they are cooked with the peel on
- Place the unpeeled bananas in a large pot of boiling water
- Cook for about 30 to 40 minutes or until the bananas become tender
- Drain the water and serve the bananas hot. The peels can be removed just before eating
- It is served with muchomo, roasted pork, groundnut (peanut) sauce, vegetable sauces

== Nutritional benefits ==
The peel-on cooking method retains more nutrients compared to peeling before boiling. Green bananas are a rich source of dietary fiber, potassium, and resistant starch, which aids digestion. When paired with protein-rich accompaniments like roasted meat or peanut sauce, Empogola provides a balanced meal.

== See also ==
- Banana
- Cooking plantain
- Cuisine of Burundi
- Cuisine of Rwanda
- Cuisine of Uganda
- List of African dishes
