= Matoke =

Banana cultivar

East African Highland bananas
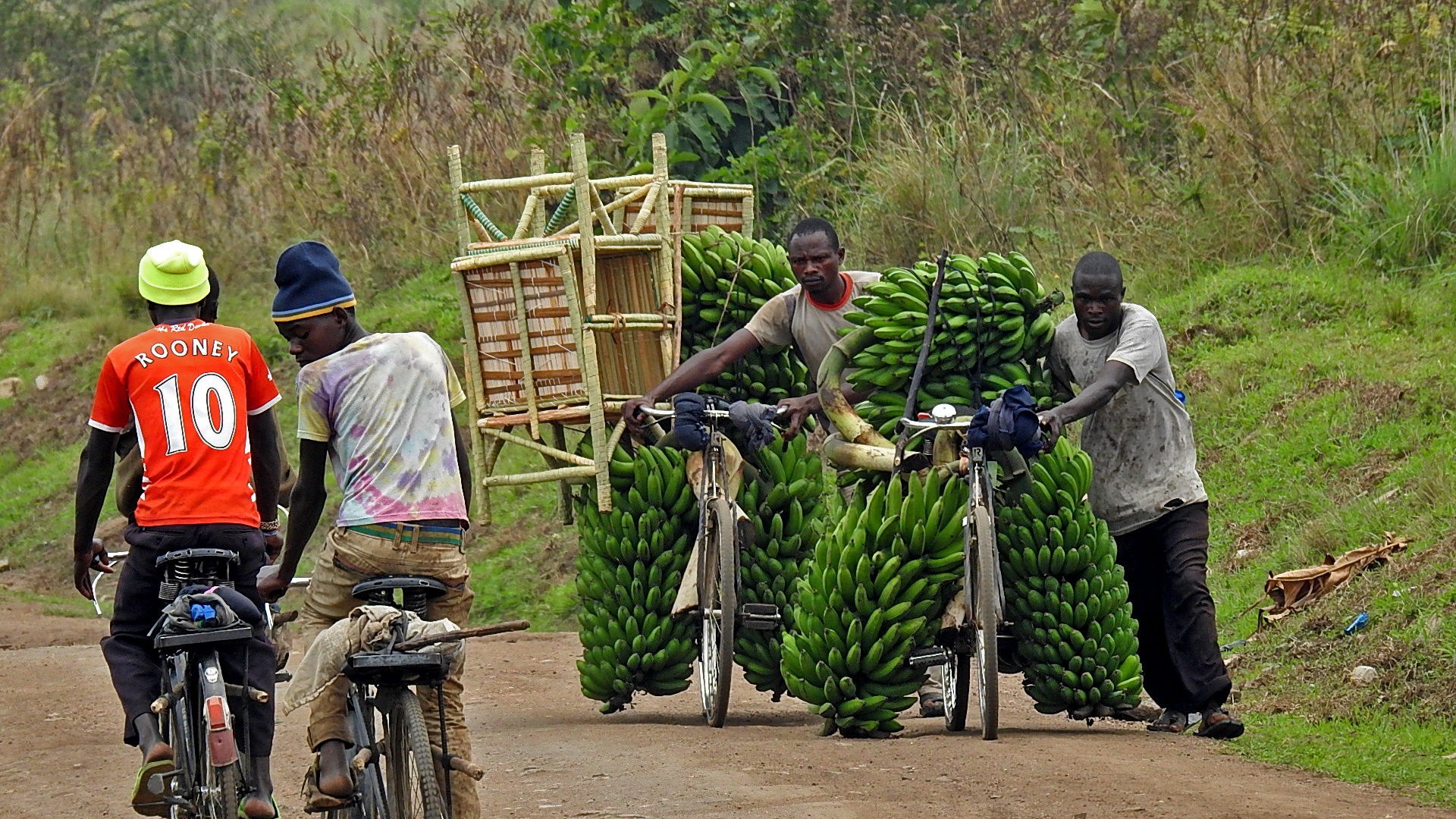
- Men taking banana (matooke) to the market
- Species: Musa acuminata
- Cultivar group: Musa acuminata (AAA-EA) or the Mutika/Lujugira subgroup of the AAA group
- Origin: Uganda
- Cultivar group members: See text

Matoke, locally also known as matooke, amatooke in Buganda (Central Uganda), ekitookye in southwestern Uganda, ekitooke in western Uganda, kamatore in Lugisu (Eastern Uganda), ebitooke in northwestern Tanzania, igitoki in Rwanda, Burundi and by the cultivar name East African Highland banana, are a group of starchy triploid banana cultivars, originating from the African Great Lakes. The fruit is harvested green, carefully peeled, and then cooked and often mashed or pounded into a meal. In Uganda and Rwanda, the fruit is steam-cooked, and the mashed meal is considered a national dish in both countries.

Matoke bananas are a staple food crop in Uganda, Kenya, Tanzania and other Great Lakes countries. They are also known as the Mutika/Lujugira subgroup.

The medium-sized green fruits, which are of a specific group of banana, the East African Highland bananas (Musa AAA-EA), are known in the Bantu languages of Uganda and Western Kenya as matoke.

Cooking bananas have long been and still are a common staple crop around the Lake Victoria area of Kenya and Uganda, and in the West and Kilimanjaro regions of Tanzania.

== Description ==
In Uganda, East African Highland bananas are easily distinguishable from other banana cultivars by the numerous black (or more rarely brown or bronze) blotches on their pseudostems, giving them the appearance of polished metal. The outermost sheath of their pseudostems is a medium green, superimposed over the pink to purple underlying sheaths.

Their leaves are also darker green and dull, a difference more apparent when comparing them side by side with other banana cultivars from a distance.

The inflorescence has peduncles covered with coarse hair. The bracts are ovate to lanceolate in shape with outer surfaces that are purple to brown and inner surfaces which are red fading to yellow towards the base. The male flowers have cream colored tepals with yellow lobes. The anthers are pink, while the stigmata are orange.

The fruits are recurved and can vary in length. They are inflated with blunt tips. The pulp is white in unripe fruits and cream-colored in ripe fruits.

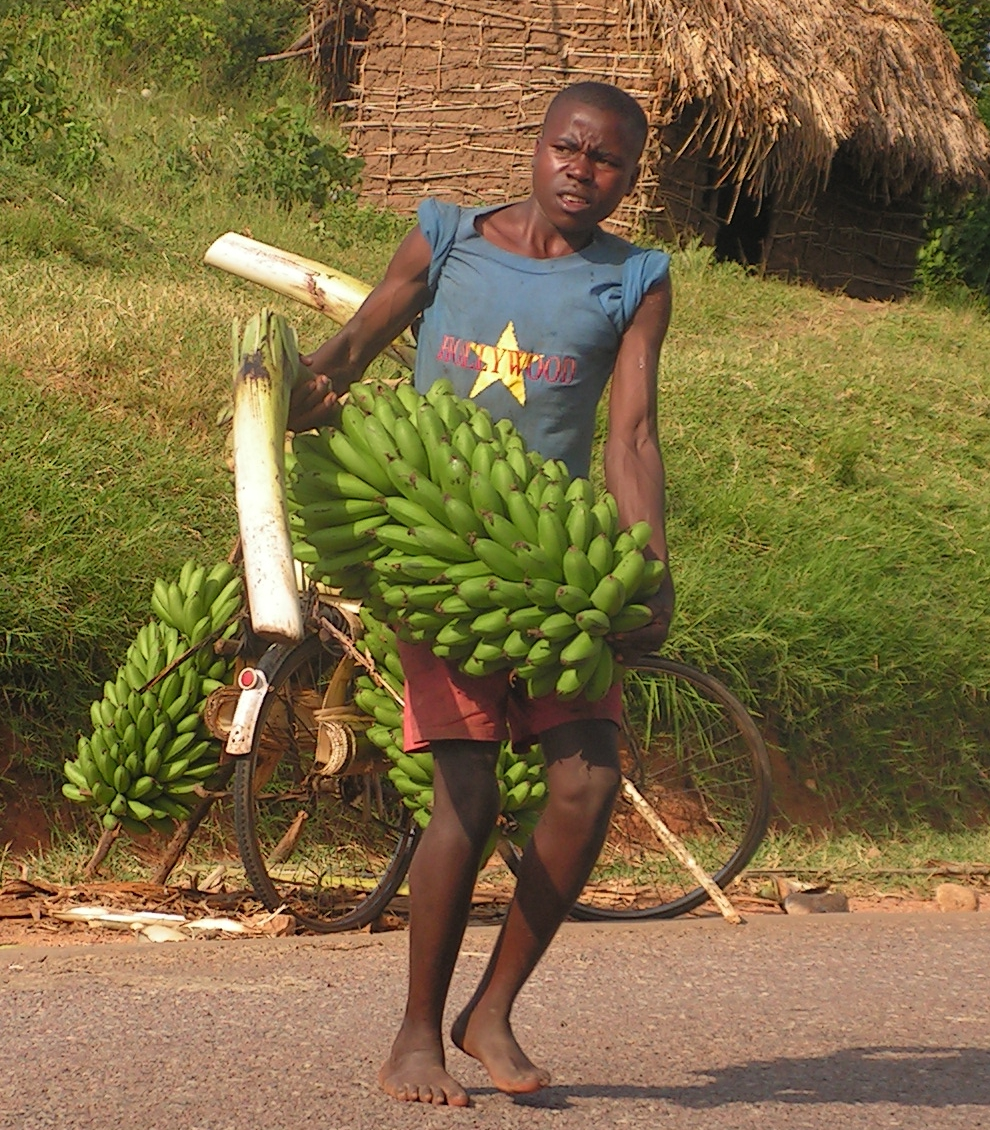

== Taxonomy ==
East African Highland bananas are triploid (AAA) cultivars. Their official designation is Musa acuminata Colla (AAA-EA). Synonyms include Musa brieyi De Wild. Their paternal parent is the blood banana subspecies (M. acuminata ssp. zebrina) of the wild banana species Musa acuminata.

East African Highland bananas are a subgroup that refers to about 200 individual banana cultivars (or clones). They can be subdivided into five distinct groups of clones known as clone sets according to their use:

- Mbidde or beer clone set

The Mbidde clone set contains 14 cultivars. Mbidde means 'beer', and clones belonging to this clone set are usually used for making banana beer. Their pulp is bitter and astringent with sticky brown excretions.

- Nakitembe clone set
- Nakabululu clone set

Nakabululu clones are soft-textured and savory. They mature quickly, but their fruits are smaller and have lesser overall yields per bunch.

- Musakala clone set

Musakala clones are characterized by slender fruits with bottle-necked tips. Other characteristics are the same as the preceding three clone sets.

- Nfuuka clone set

Nfuuka clones are characterized by inflated, rounded, or almost rectangular fruits with intermediate-shaped tips. The bunch shape is mainly rectangular. Other characteristics are the same as the other clone sets. It is the most diverse of the five clone sets, a probable result of its tendency to mutate more frequently. They bear heavy compacted bunches and are thus more often exploited commercially than other clone sets.
Mbwazirume
Musakala
Kibuzi
Mpologoma
sukaali ndiizi
Kawanda

Over 500 local names are known for cultivars from the EAHB subgroup.

== Origin and distribution ==
East African Highland bananas were introduced early into Africa from Southeast Asia during the first to sixth centuries AD, probably via trade. They are genetically distinct from the other AAA cultivars, having evolved locally in the African Great Lakes region for over a millennium. They are found nowhere else in the world, and the African Great Lakes has been called the secondary center of banana diversity because of this (with Southeast Asia being the first). East African Highland bananas are considered to be especially diverse in Uganda, Burundi, and Rwanda. However, genetic analysis has revealed that all East African Highland bananas are genetically uniform, having most likely originated from a single ancestral clone (introduced to Africa within the past 2000 years) that underwent population expansion by vegetative propagation. The triploid East African Highland banana gene pool arose from a single hybridization event, which generated a genetic bottleneck during the foundation of the crop genepool. Triploid East African Highland bananas are sterile, and have been asexually vegetatively propagated for generations by successive generations of farmers since their introduction to Africa. This has likely led to the emergence of the genetically near-isogenic somatic mutants (i.e. today's East African Highland banana varieties) that have been selected by farmers and environments across East Africa.

== Economic importance ==
East African Highland bananas are one of the most important staple food crops in the African Great Lakes region, particularly for Uganda, Tanzania, Kenya, Burundi, and Rwanda. Per capita annual consumption of bananas in Uganda is the highest in the world at 0.70 kg (1.5 lb) daily per person. Including Rwanda and Burundi, consumption is about 250 to 400 kg (550 to 880 lb) per person annually (about three to 11 bananas each day). Uganda is the second-largest producer of bananas in the world. It is, however, one of the smallest exporters, with the crops being used mostly for domestic consumption.

East African Highland bananas are so important as food crops, the local name matoke (or more commonly matooke) is synonymous for the word "food" in Uganda. Also, a portion of the East African Highland bananas locally known as mbidde is used to produce juice and beer.

== Food preparation ==
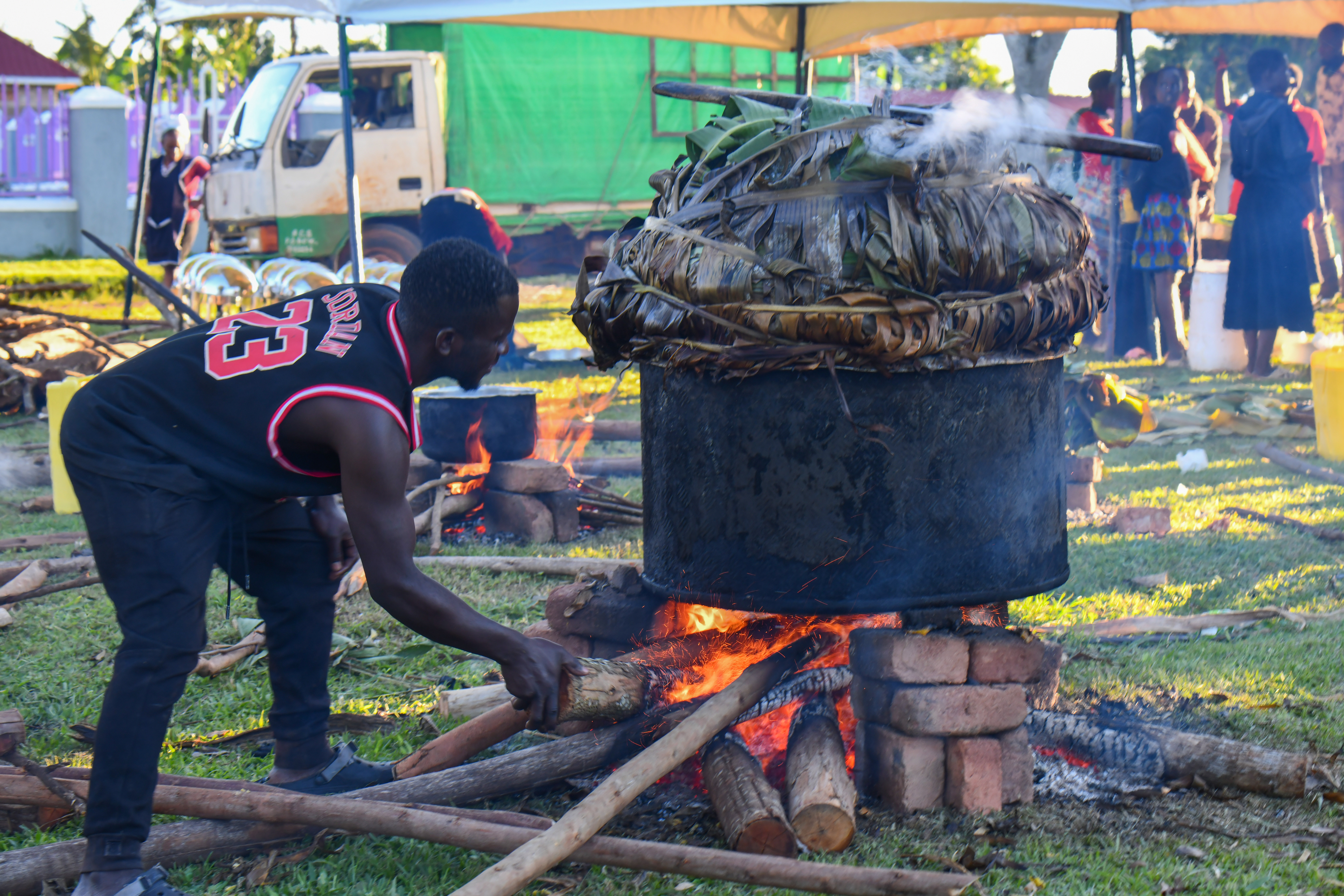
A man cooking matoke

Matoke are peeled using a knife, wrapped in the plant's leaves (or plastic bags), and set in a cooking pot (Swahili: sufuria) atop the banana stalks. The pot is then placed on a charcoal or wood fire and the matoke is steamed for a couple of hours; water is poured into the bottom of the cooking pot multiple times. The stalks in the bottom of the pot keep the leaf-wrapped fruits above the level of the hot water. While uncooked, the matoke is white and fairly hard; cooking turns it soft and yellow. The matoke is then mashed while still wrapped in the leaves or bags and often served on a fresh banana leaf. It is typically eaten with a sauce made of vegetables, ground peanut, or some type of meat (goat or beef).

Matoke are also used to make a popular breakfast dish called katogo in Uganda. Katogo is commonly cooked as a combination of peeled bananas and peanuts or beef, though offal or goat meat are also common.

In Bukoba, Tanzania, matoke (or ebitooke) are cooked with meat or smoked catfish, and beans or groundnuts. This method eliminates the need for preparing a separate sauce. In this recipe, the matoke are not mashed. Until the early 1980s, this was the most common meal in Bukoba and would be eaten all year.

== See also ==
- Banana
- Cooking plantain
- Cuisine of Burundi
- Cuisine of Rwanda
- Cuisine of Uganda
- List of African dishes
- Plantain
- Banana cultivar groups
- Ensete
- Musa balbisiana
- Empogola
