= Katogo (food) =

Ugandan breakfast dish

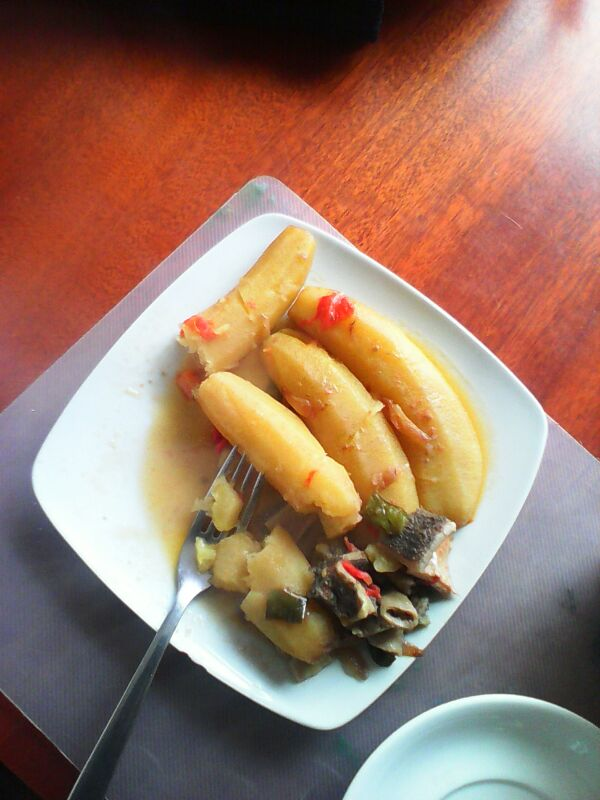
- Course: Breakfast
- Place of origin: Uganda
- Main ingredients: Matoke, Beef, Offal, Beans

Katogo is a traditional breakfast dish in Uganda. It is served in most regions of Uganda and is defined as a mixture of ingredients. The main ingredients of the dish are matooke and a sauce (beef, ghee, offal, beans)

== Origins ==
Katogo originated from Buganda and Western Uganda, where it was initially perceived as a poor man's dish. No exact chronology has been found as to when Ugandans started cooking katogo, but as long as matooke has been around, so has katogo. The Baganda came up with the katogo dish which is a combination of offal and matooke. Katogo was originally a combination of diced cassava mixed with beans. This was the poor man's meal. The upper classes, introduced matooke to replace cassava and later versions of katogo brought on offals and other new sauces. The popularity of katogo quickly spread all over Uganda and to date there are many variations of the cuisine. It is a common delicacy among the Bantu speaking communities and most of Uganda’s urban communities. It is now available in most restaurants and hotels, served as breakfast.

== Recipes ==
There are various recipes for this dish but the most popular is the one where matooke is the staple and the sauce is offal known as byenda in Uganda. The culinary term for byenda (offal) is tripe and sweetbreads which are the inner lining of the stomach, the thymus gland and the pancreas respectively. The peeled matooke (green bananas) are cooked in the prepared sauce of byenda (offals) until the matooke is ready. Katogo is usually served with cooked greens and fruit juice.

== Cooking method ==
The process of cooking is done by braising the sauce (offal, beef, ground peanuts or beans) which is brought to a boil and later simmered until it is ready. The sauce is then poured over the peeled matoke and left to simmer until the matooke is ready. Katogo takes a relatively short time to prepare and today most people use wood or charcoal as a cooking fuel.

== Variations ==
The variations of this dish include a staple (matooke, Irish potatoes, cassava or sweet potatoes) which is cooked in the same pot with a sauce (beef, offal, beans, peas, groundnuts or greens).

== See also ==
- Matooke
- Luwombo
- Cuisine of Uganda
- List of African dishes
