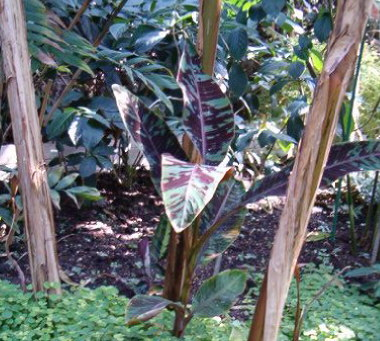
- Typical young specimen

Scientific classification
- Kingdom: Plantae
- Clade: Tracheophytes
- Clade: Angiosperms
- Clade: Monocots
- Clade: Commelinids
- Order: Zingiberales
- Family: Musaceae
- Genus: Musa
- Species: M. acuminata
- Variety: M. a. var. zebrina

Trinomial name
- Musa acuminata var. zebrina (Van Houtte ex Planch.) Nasution

Synonyms
- Musa rojo hort.; Musa sumatrana Becc.; Musa sumatrana Becc. ex André; Musa sumatrana 'Rubra' hort.; Musa zebrina Van Houtte ex Planchon; Musa zebrina (Van Houtte) Backer; Musa zebrina 'Rojo' hort.

= Blood banana =

Variety of fruit

The blood banana (Musa acuminata var. zebrina), is a variety of the wild banana Musa acuminata native to Java, Indonesia. The blood banana is an ornamental plant, named for the dark red patches on its leaves, though its small-seeded fruits are also edible. It grows 6' to 8' tall in the wild, but is well-adapted to container growing and can be maintained at 3' to 5'. It grows best in full or partial sun and is hardy in zones 9 - 11.

== Taxonomy and nomenclature ==
The blood banana is a variety of the wild banana species Musa acuminata, one of the two ancestors of modern edible bananas. It was once classified as separate species under the now invalid names (synonyms) Musa zebrina and Musa sumatrana. It was also sometimes incorrectly classified as a cultivar. The variety is not accepted by some sources, including the World Checklist of Selected Plant Families, which regards it as part of the nominate subspecies of Musa acuminata, M. acuminata subsp. acuminata.

The blood banana is also known as the red banana tree, though it should not be confused with the red banana cultivar. Other common names in English include seeded red banana, Sumatra ornamental banana, and maroon-variegated banana plant. They are also known as banano rojo in Spanish, ゼブリナバナナ (zeburina banana) in Japanese, กล้วยมะนี (kluai ma ni) in Thai, and chuối kiểng in Vietnamese.

== Description ==
Blood bananas are characterized by dark red patches of variable sizes on their dark green leaves. Their pseudostems are characteristically very slender. They bear small, slender fruits filled with grape-like seeds.

== Distribution ==
Blood bananas are native to Java, Indonesia. They are notable for being one of the earliest banana subspecies to be spread by humans out of Southeast Asia. Introduced westward to Africa, they became the ancestors for the genetically distinct and commercially important East African Highland bananas (Mutika/Lujugira subgroup of the AAA group).

It is probably the only seeded banana to ever be introduced into Hawaii before European contact. It is known as the maiʻa ʻoa in Hawaiian, though the name is also applied to the species Musa balbisiana, which was introduced later.

== Gallery ==
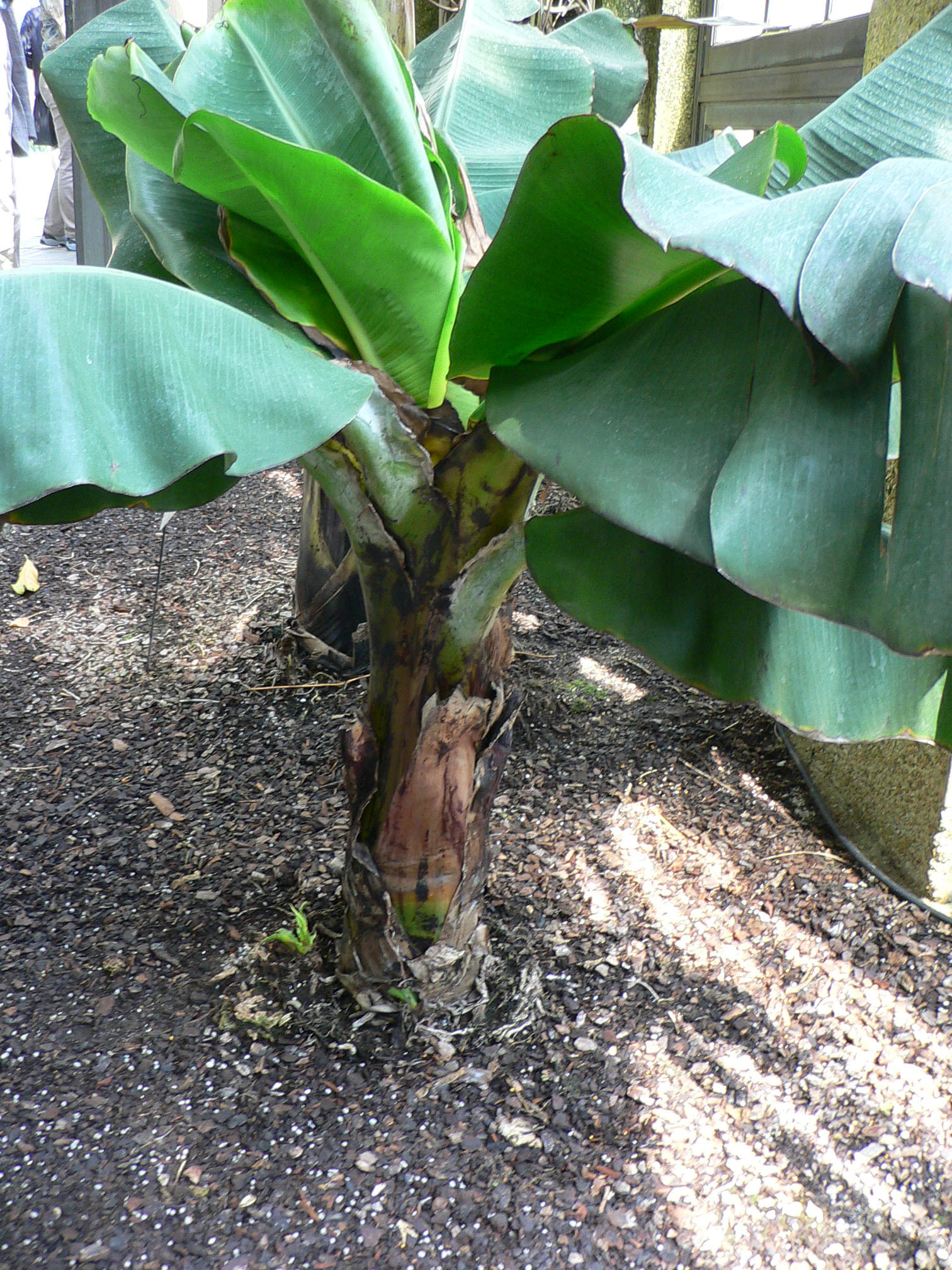
Essentially unpatterned young plant at Longwood Gardens

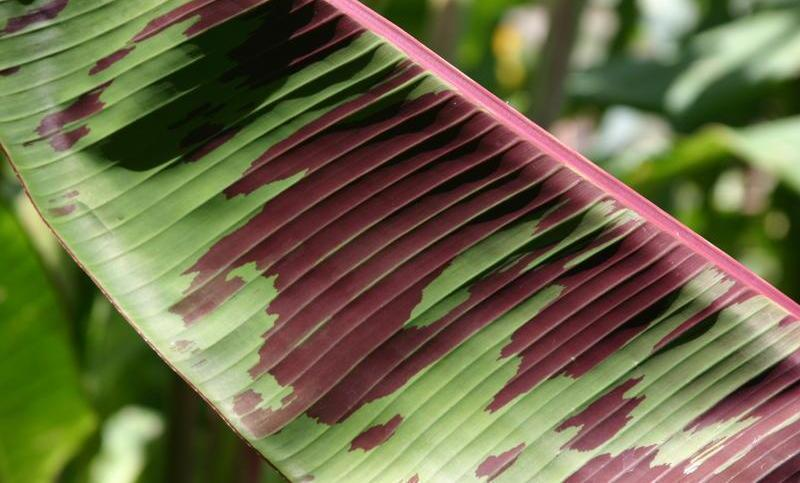
Closeup of a strongly patterned leaf

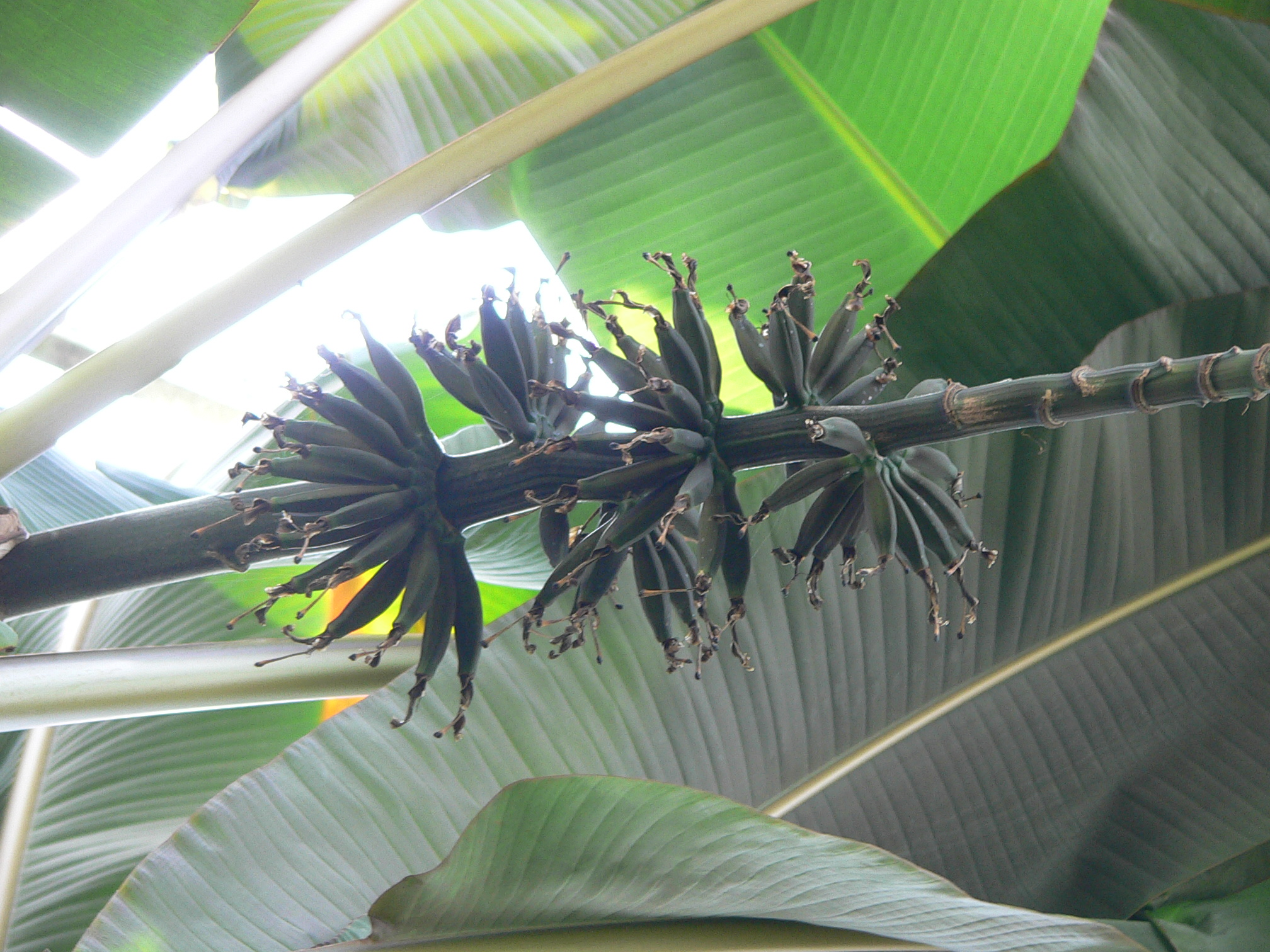
Inflorescence

== See also ==
- Banana
- Banana Cultivar Groups
- East African Highland bananas
