= Rwandan cuisine =

Culinary traditions of Rwanda

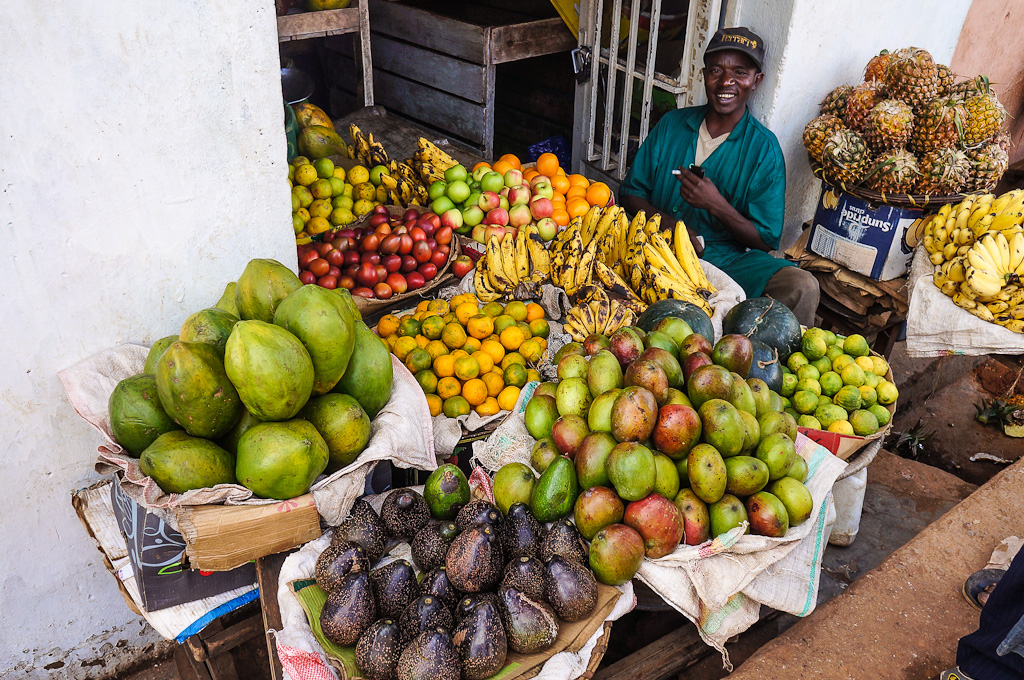
A fruit stall

Rwandan cuisine differs from other East African cuisine by its greater plant-based ingredients and sauces, despite considerable overlap in ingredients. Staple foods are largely produced from subsistence agriculture, although with notable regional variation.

== Rural-urban gap ==
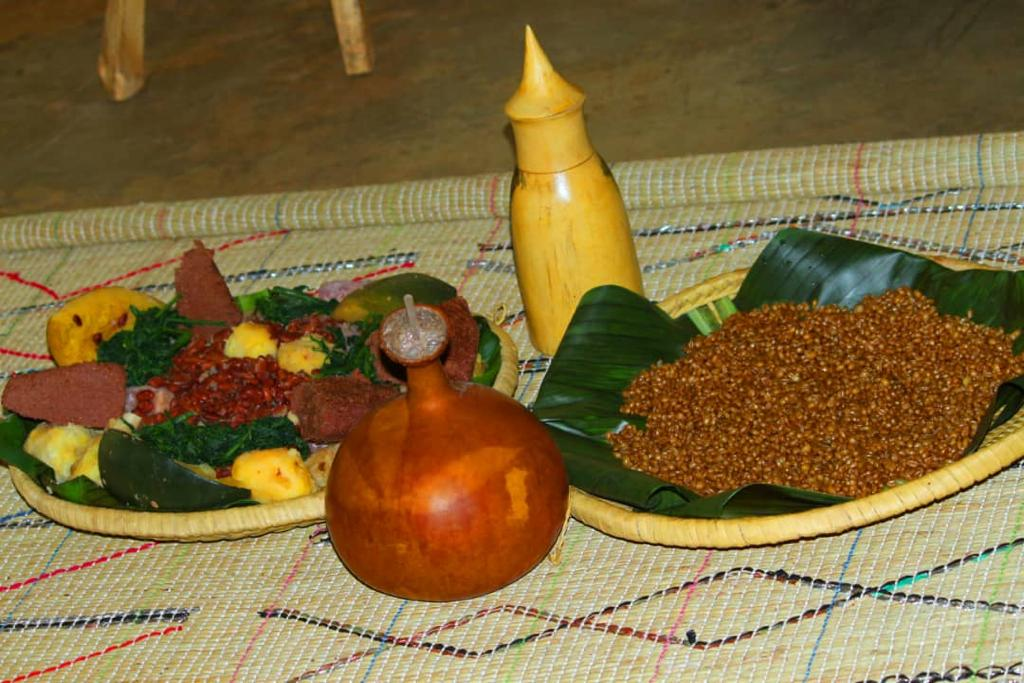
A local dish in the Northern Province, Rwanda

Dietary patterns differ between urban and rural residents. Urban populations tend to consume higher amounts of processed foods, soft-drinks, sweets, meat, eggs, milk, coffee or tea, and deep fried foods. While rural populations rely more heavily on traditional staple foods.

== History ==
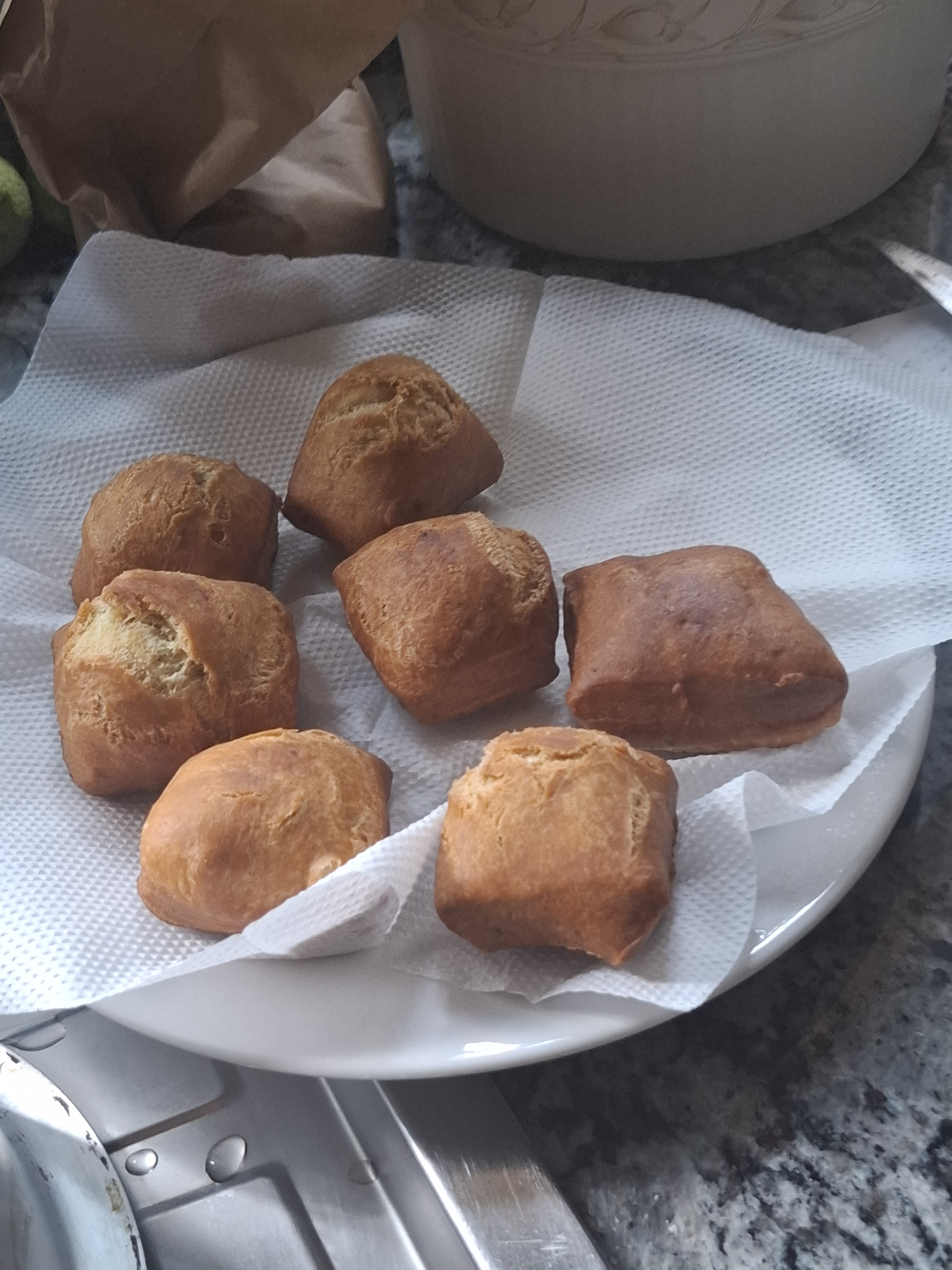
Mandazi, a common snack in Rwanda

Historically, dietary habits in Rwanda varied by ethnic group: the Hutus primarily farmed and some hunting, consuming mostly plant-based foods with occasional meat; the Twa focused on hunting and wild foods, supplemented by plants; and the Tutsis, as pastoralists, consumed relatively large amounts of milk and dairy products compared with other groups.

Rwanda's cuisine has also been influenced by other regions. Many crops, like potatoes (mainly grown in Gitarama and Butare) and maize (used to make ugali), came from South America through colonial introductions. Indian foods, such as chapati and samosas, arrived via trade along the Swahili Coast and are now widely eaten. Neighbouring countries like Tanzania influenced Rwandan cuisine, introducing foods like Mandazi.

== Staples ==
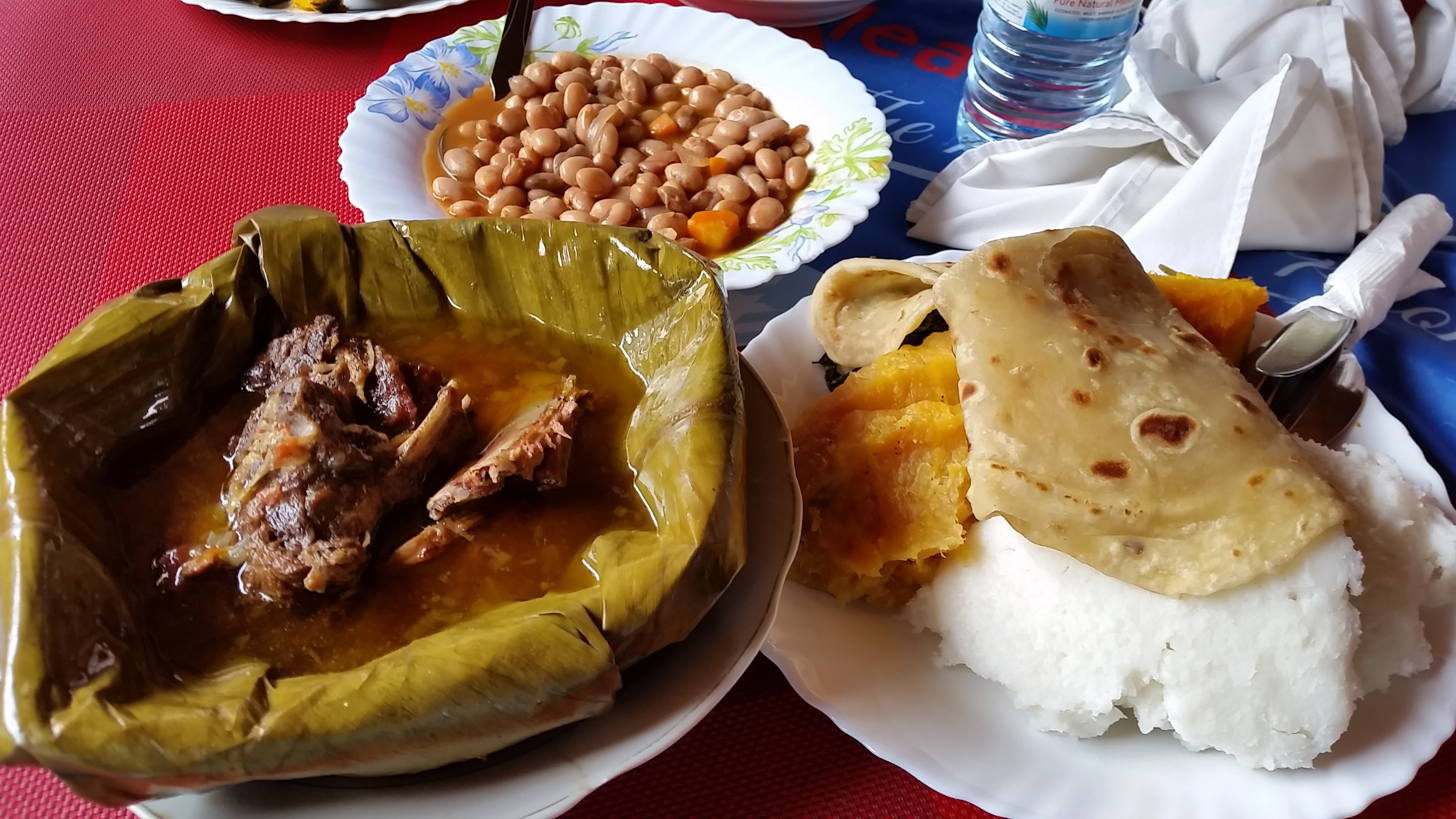
Luwombo served with matooke, posho and chapatti

Rwandan staples include rice, bananas, plantains, sweet potatoes, ugali, beans, and cassava. Most people in rural areas rely on farming, and many farmers do not sell their crops because it may be hard to reach markets. Meat such as beef, goat, chicken and tilapia is also commonly eaten.

== Rwandese dishes ==
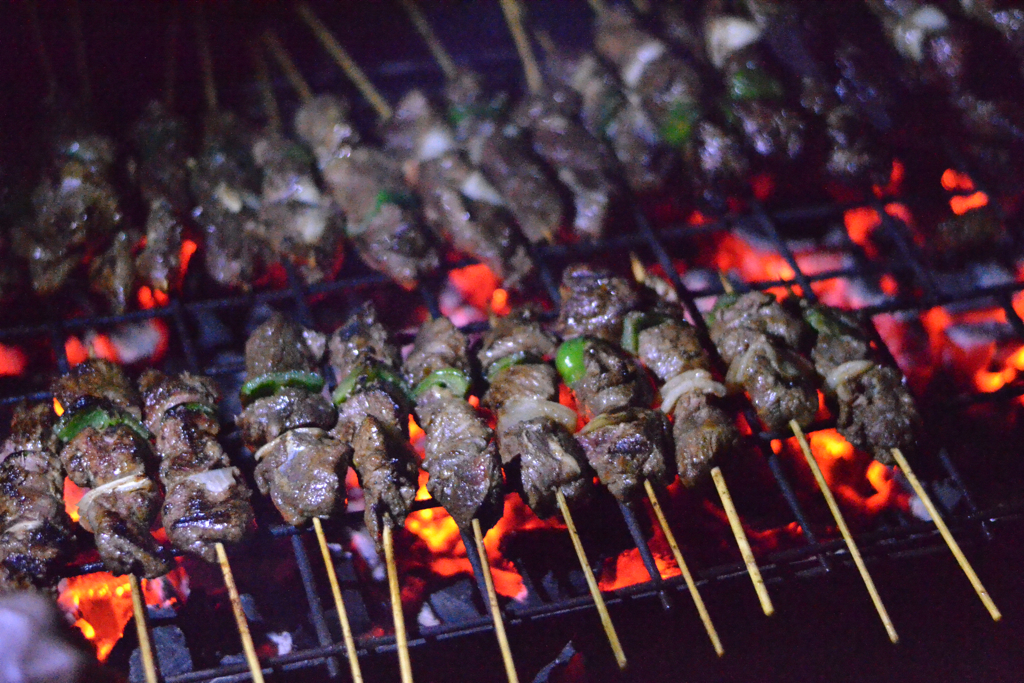
Brochettes from a grill

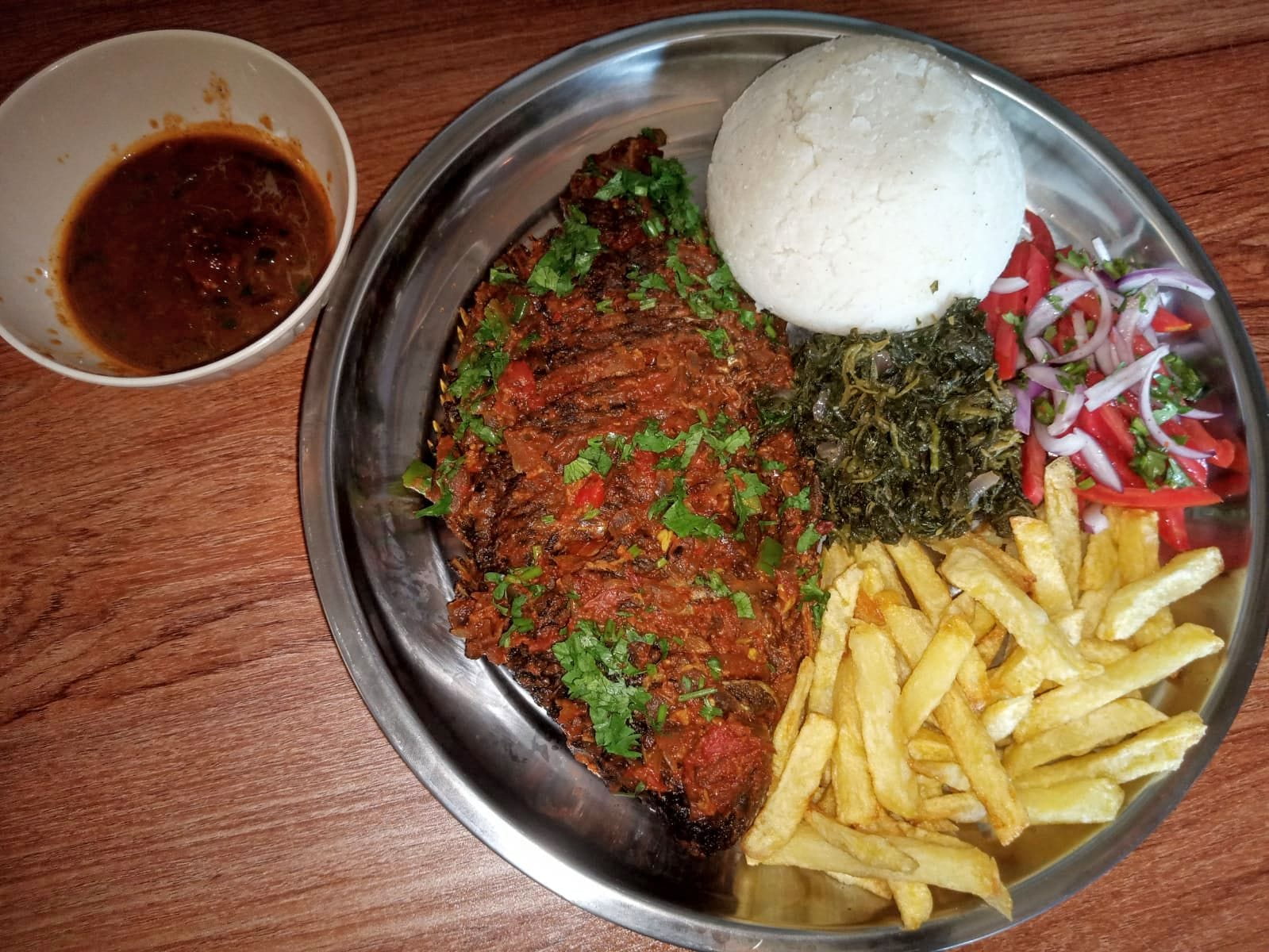
Food platter with Fish, fries,Ugali, veges and salsa

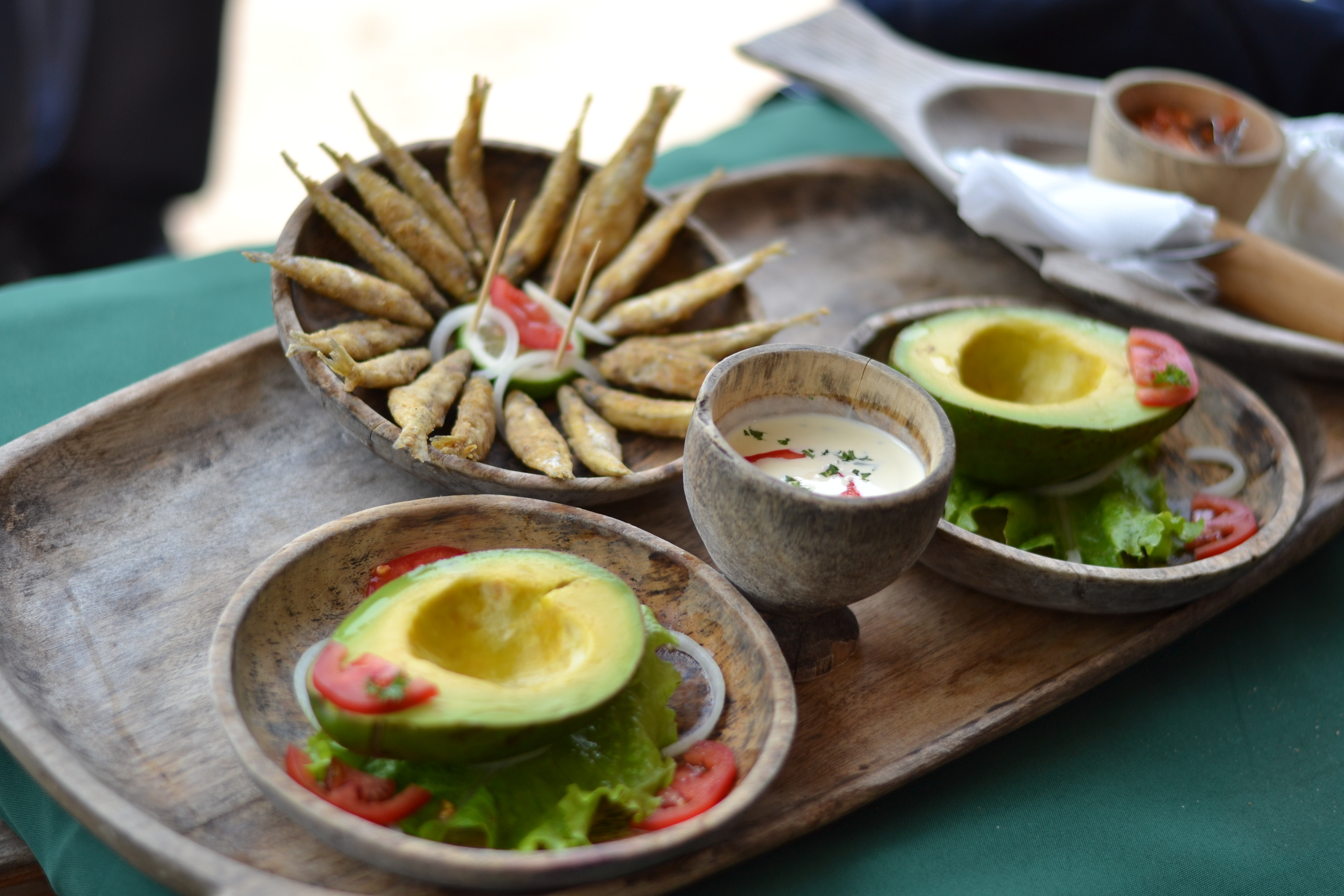
Snacks in Gisenyi

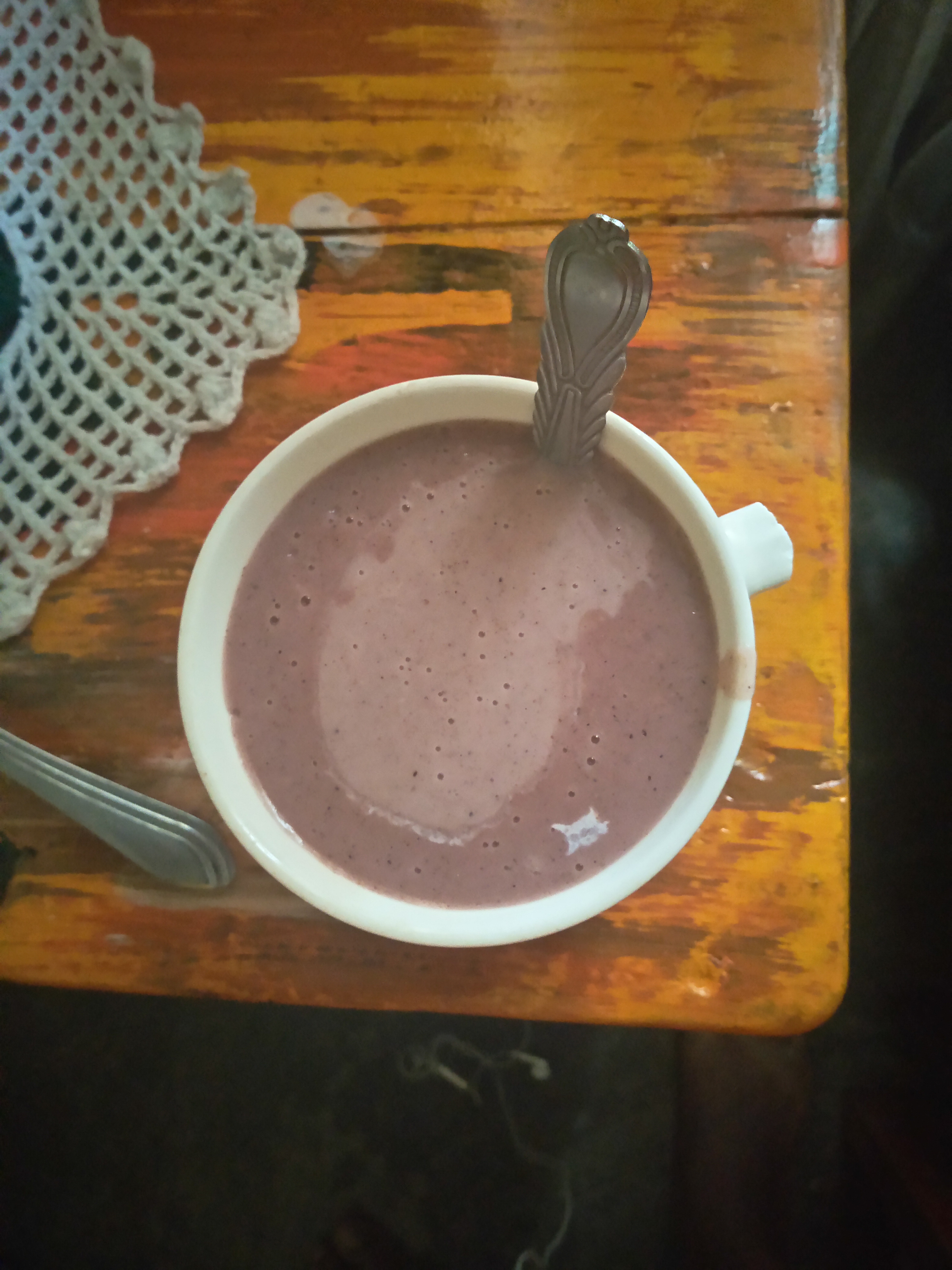
Igikoma

=== Breakfast dishes ===
Rwandan people typically eat simple foods in the morning. Common choices include roasted sweet potatoes, cassava or plantains, as well as porridge made from maize, sorghum or cassava. Tea or coffee, often sweetened and sometimes with milk, is usually served alongside. In urban areas, breads like Mandazi or Chapati are also commonly eaten.

=== Lunch dishes ===
In Rwanda, lunch is generally the main meal of the day. Meals typically include a staple food such as rice, beans, potatoes, cassava, or plantains, with vegetables or occasionally meat, fish, or eggs, depending on availability or region.

Dishes common at lunch include:

- Isombe —cassava leaves cooked with ground peanuts and vegetables
- Ugali—a firm dough made from maize or cassava flour eaten with beans, vegetables and meat
- Matoke—boiled or steamed green plantains, sometimes mashed
- Brochettes—grilled meat on a skewer, usually goat or beef
- Tilapia—whole fried or grilled freshwater fish
- Pilau—spiced rice, sometimes cooked with meat
- Ibihaza—pumpkin cooked with beans

=== Other foods ===
Rwandans also eat smaller foods as snacks, especially in the evening or when socialising.

Examples include:

- Sambaza—tiny fried lake fish, usually eaten as whole
- Akabenz—fried pork pieces, often served with chili or onions
- Chapati—flatbread cooked on a pan
- Samosa—fried pastry with meat or vegetables
- Mandazi—slightly sweet fried dough snack

== Beverages ==
Drinks in Rwanda range from milk-based drinks to alcoholic beverages.

Non-alcoholic drinks include:

- Ikivuguto—thick fermented milk consumed in many households
- Igikoma—thin porridge made from sorghum or maize
- Tea or coffee—often sweetened
- Fruit juice—locally made from fruits like passionfruit, pineapple, mango
- Soda—fanta is the most popular brand

Alcoholic drinks include:

- Primus, Mützig and Amstel — popular commercial beers
- Urwagwa — banana beer made from fermented banana juice
- Ikigage—beer from dry sorghum
- Ubuki— beer from fermented honey

== See also ==
- Ugandan cuisine

== Bibliography ==
- Adekunle, Julius (2007). Culture and Customs of Rwanda. Greenwood Publishing Group. ISBN 978-0-313-33177-0.
- Auzias, Dominique (2007). Rwanda (in French). Petit Futé. ISBN 978-2-7469-2037-8.
- King, David C. (2007). Rwanda. Marshall Cavendish. ISBN 978-0-7614-2333-1.
- Twagilimana, Aimable (1997). Hutu and Tutsi. The Rosen Publishing Group. p. 19. ISBN 0-8239-1999-4.
