= Ugandan cuisine =

Culinary traditions of Uganda

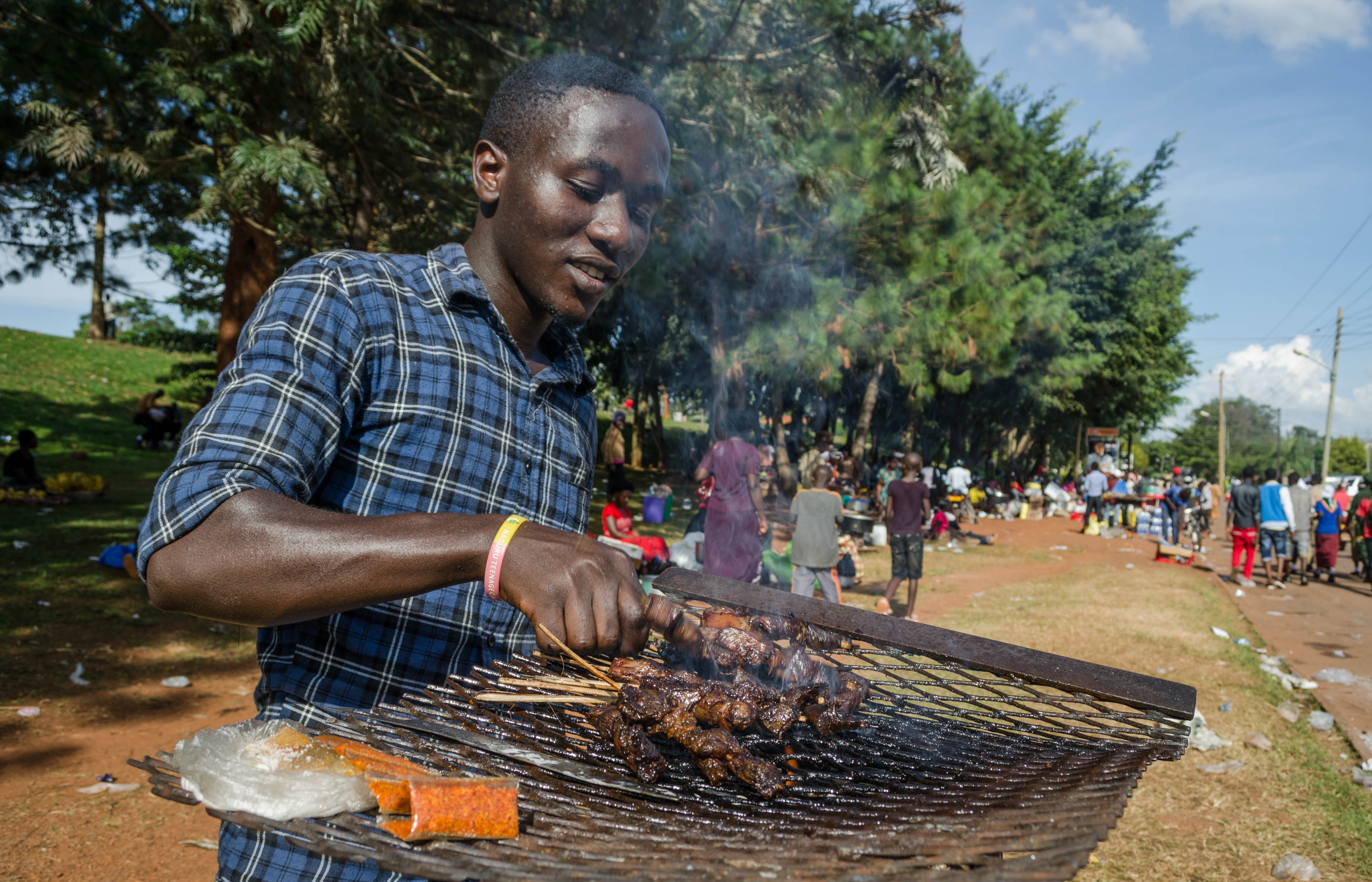
Beef skewer barbecue

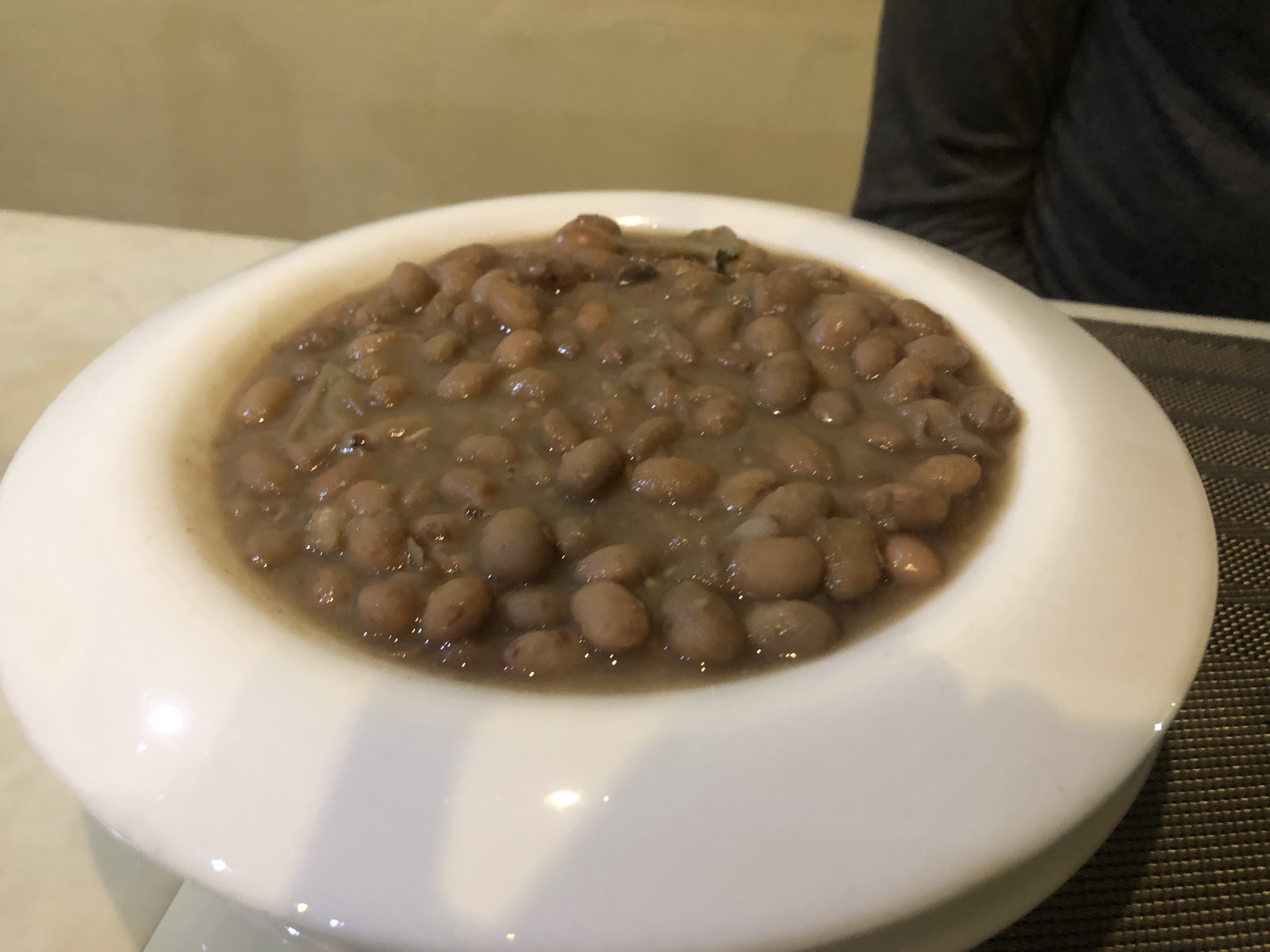
Stew made with brown beans, onion, bitter tomato, and salt

Ugandan cuisine consists of traditional and modern cooking styles, practices, foods and dishes in Uganda, with English, Arab, and Asian (especially Indian) influences.

Many dishes include various vegetables, potatoes, yams, bananas and other tropical fruits.

Chicken, pork, fish (usually fresh, but there is also a dried variety, reconstituted for stewing), beef and goat are all commonly eaten, although among the rural poor, meats are consumed less than in other areas, and mostly eaten in the form of bushmeat. Nyama is the Luganda language word for "meat".

== Main dishes ==
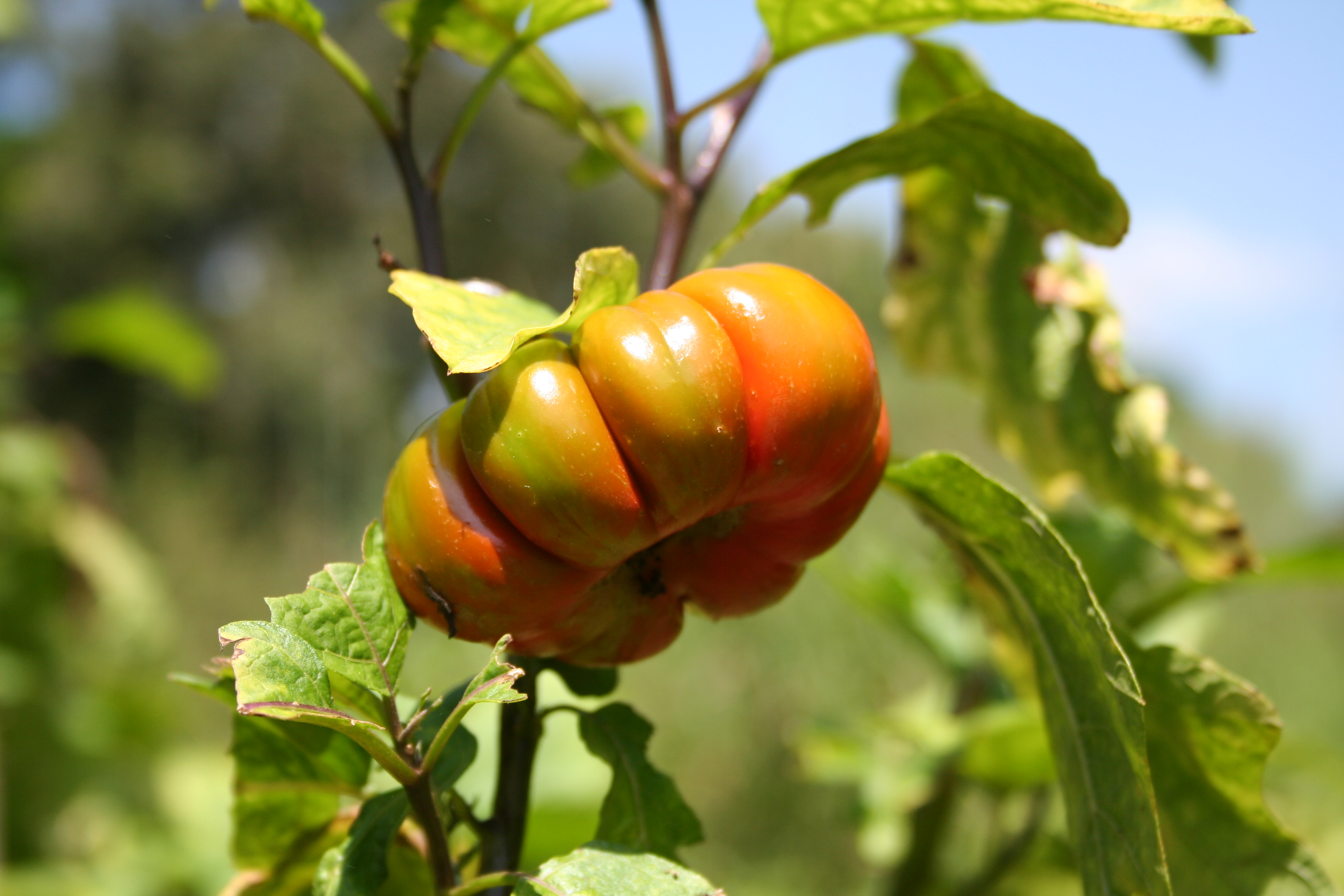
Nakati, Ethiopian eggplant

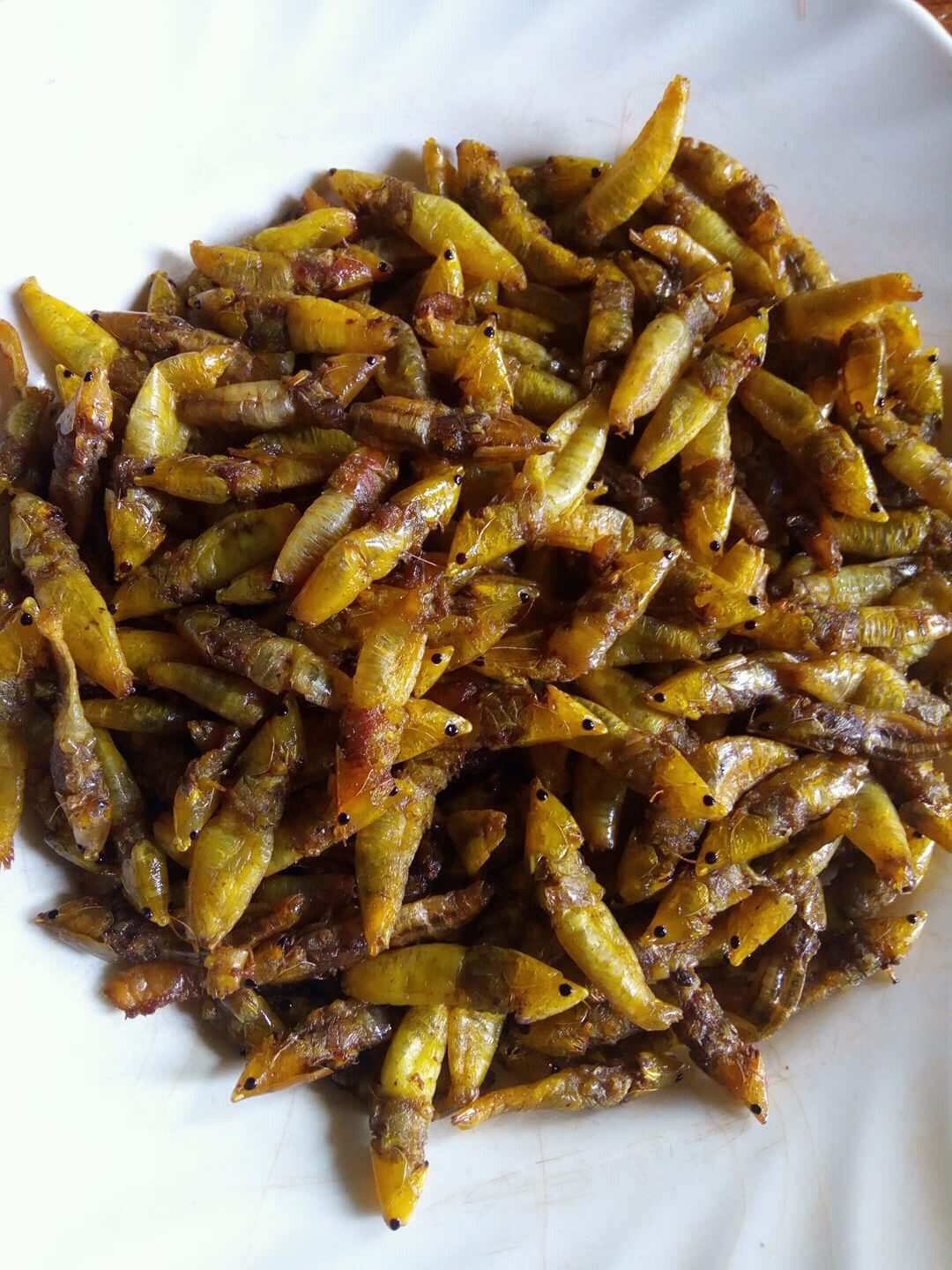
Grasshopper dish

Main dishes are usually centred on a sauce or stew of simsim, groundnuts, beans or meat. The starch traditionally comes from posho (maize meal) or matooke (steamed and mashed green banana) in the central or kalo (an ugali dish made from millet) in the north, east and west. Posho or millet is cooked as a porridge for breakfast.

For main meals, white maize flour is added to the saucepan and stirred into the posho until the consistency is firm. It is then turned out onto a serving plate and cut into individual slices (or served onto individual plates in the kitchen). Cassava, yam, and African sweet potato are also eaten; the more affluent include white (often called "Irish" or "Western"/mazungu) potato and rice in their diets. Soybeans were promoted as a healthy food staple in the 1970s and this is also occasionally eaten for breakfast, although mostly used as feed for animals. Chapati, similar to Asian flatbreads, are also part of Ugandan cuisine.

== Fruits and vegetables ==
Various leafy greens are grown in Uganda. These may be boiled in the stews, or served as side dishes in fancier homes. Amaranth (dodo), nakati, and borr are examples of regional greens. Fruits such as mangoes, bananas and pineapples are plentiful and commonly consumed, whether cooked in foods or eaten alone as snacks or as a dessert.

== Traditional food ==
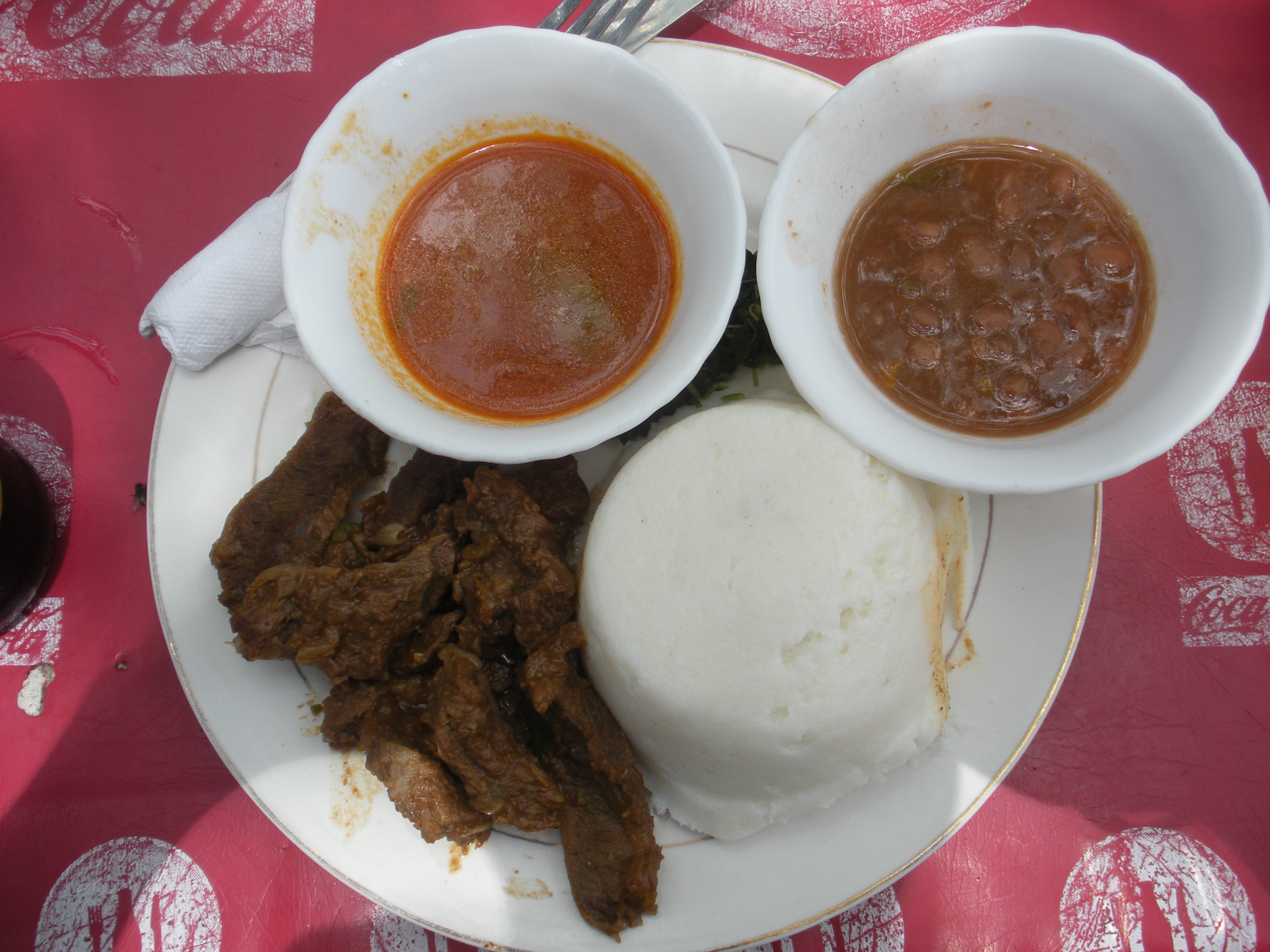
Posho or ugali consists of maize flour (cornmeal) cooked with water to a porridge- or dough-like consistency. Pictured on the bottom right of the plate, it is served with beef and sauce

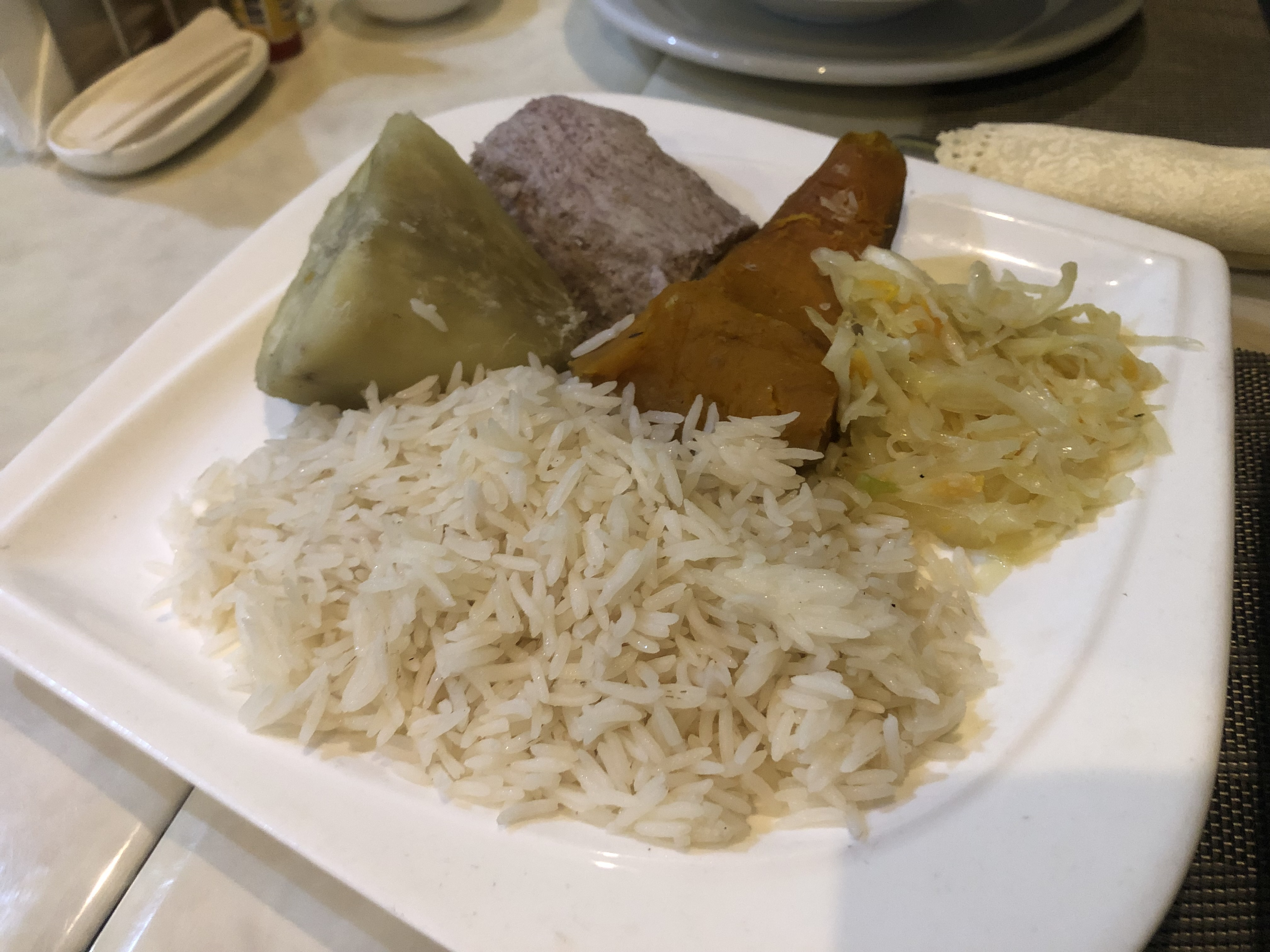
Main dishes are often accompanied by a variety of starchy foods, such as white rice, matoke or 'matooke' (green banana), juuni (purple yam) of African sweet potato, pumpkin, and curried cabbage as appear in this picture.

- Posho or kawunga—called ugali in Kenya, it is usually made from maize but also other starches; regional names include kwon. Ugandan expatriates make posho from cornmeal, masa harina or grits. Kwon is a type of ugali made from millet (called kalo in western Uganda), but in other regions like eastern Uganda they include cassava flour.
- Groundnuts (peanuts)—groundnuts are a vital staple and groundnut sauce is extremely common in Ugandan cuisine. Groundnuts are eaten plain or mixed with smoked fish, smoked meat or mushrooms, and can also be mixed with greens such as borr.
- Sim-sim (sesame)—a staple particularly in the north, roasted sesame paste is mixed into a stew of beans or greens and served as a side dish, though sesame paste may also be served as a condiment; a candy is made from roasted sesame seeds with sugar or honey.
- Matooke—(green banana, not plantain) boiled or steamed (mashed) cooked in or served with a sauce of peanuts, beans, fresh fish or meat
- Luwombo—a traditional dish from Buganda, in which a stew of chicken, beef, mushrooms or fish is steamed in banana leaves
- Malewa—a traditional dish from eastern Uganda (Bugisu), made from bamboo shoots
- Kikomando—a chapati that is cut into pieces and served with fried beans

== Snacks ==
- Roasted groundnut (peanuts)—served in a spill of paper
- Samusa (samousa, sumbusa, samosa)—Indian samosas are highly assimilated into the local cuisine, as are chapati and curry
- Mugaati n'amaggi (bread and eggs)—Originally an Arab dish, it consists of wheat dough spread into a thin pancake, filled with minced meat and raw egg, and then folded into a neat parcel, which is fried on a skillet or hotplate.
- Nsenene—a seasonal delicacy of a type of locust
- Nswaa—served similarly to nsenene, but made of white ants
- Rolex—a chapati filled with eggs, onions, cabbage or kale, and tomatoes; minced meat is sometimes added

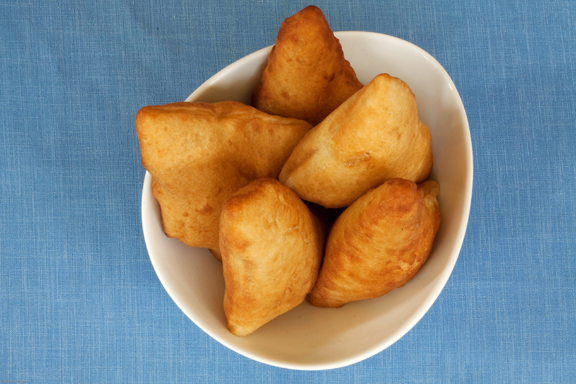
Mandazi—a common Ugandan doughnut

== Desserts ==
- Fresh fruits
- Simsim—made with sugar and sesame seeds
- Mandazi—doughnut, usually spiced with cardamon
- Kabalagala—banana pancakes, usually made from very ripe ndizi

== Beverages ==
Tea (chai) and coffee (kawa) are popular beverages and important cash crops. These can be served English-style or spiced (chai masala). Coca-Cola, Pepsi and Fanta have all made inroads in the Ugandan market and soft drinks have become very popular. Both traditional and Western beers are probably the most widely available alcoholic beverages across Uganda.

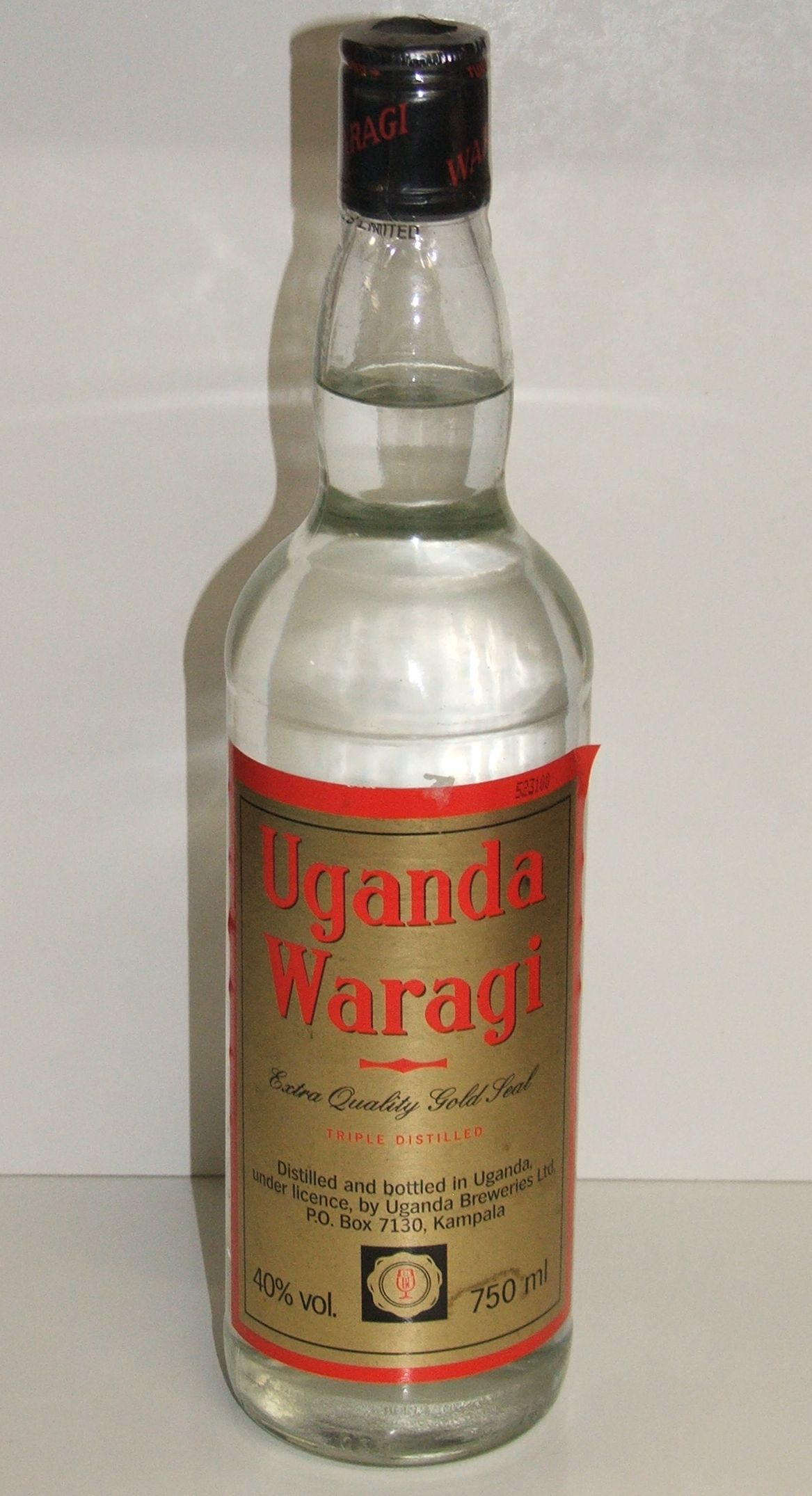
Ugandan Waragi

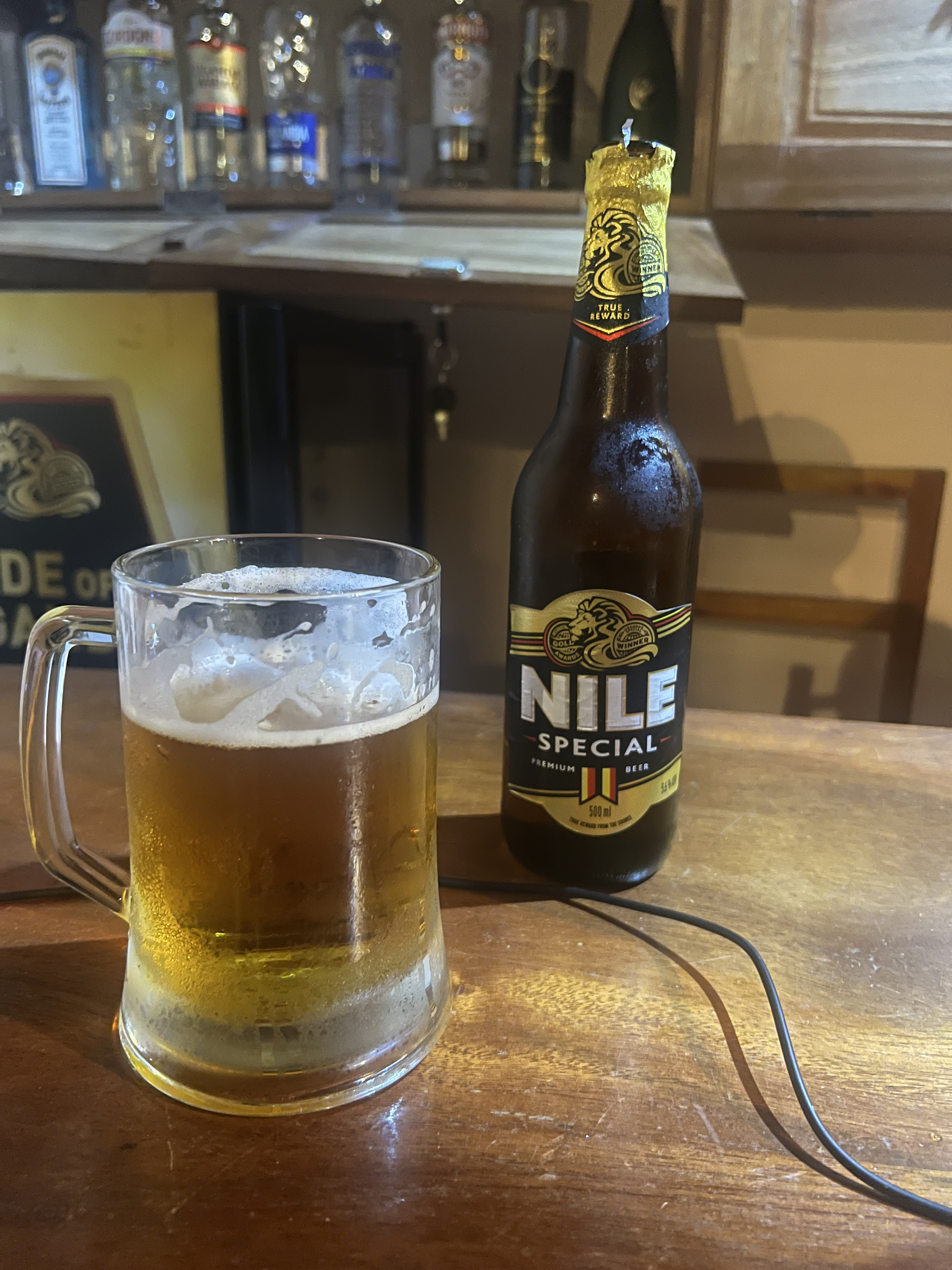
Nile Special beer, product of Nile Breweries Limited

Pombe and lubisi are generic words for locally made fermented beer, usually from banana or millet. Fermented banana wine is also prepared and consumed. Tonto is a traditional fermented drink made from bananas. Obushera beverages are types of traditional drinks made from fermented cereals.

Waragi is the generic term for distilled spirits and these also vary, see for example Uganda Waragi, a brand name for clear or yellow gin.

== See also ==
- Lugbara cuisine
- Tanzanian cuisine
