= Obushera =

Various fermented cereal beverages

- Type: Fermented cereal drink
- Course: Beverage
- Place of origin: Uganda
- Region or state: Western Uganda
- Serving temperature: Cold or at room temperature
- Main ingredients: Millet, sorghum
- Variations: Obutoko, Enturire, Ekitiribita, Obuteire

Obushera is a collective term for four traditional fermented cereal beverages originating from Western Uganda: Obutoko, Enturire, Ekitiribita, and Obuteire. These beverages are widely consumed in the western, southwestern, and central regions of Uganda. They are served as popular drinks and, to a lesser extent, as weaning foods for infants. Obushera has its roots in Ugandan culture. Some studies, along with local beliefs attribute nutritional benefits to the drink, though further research is needed to substantiate these claims.

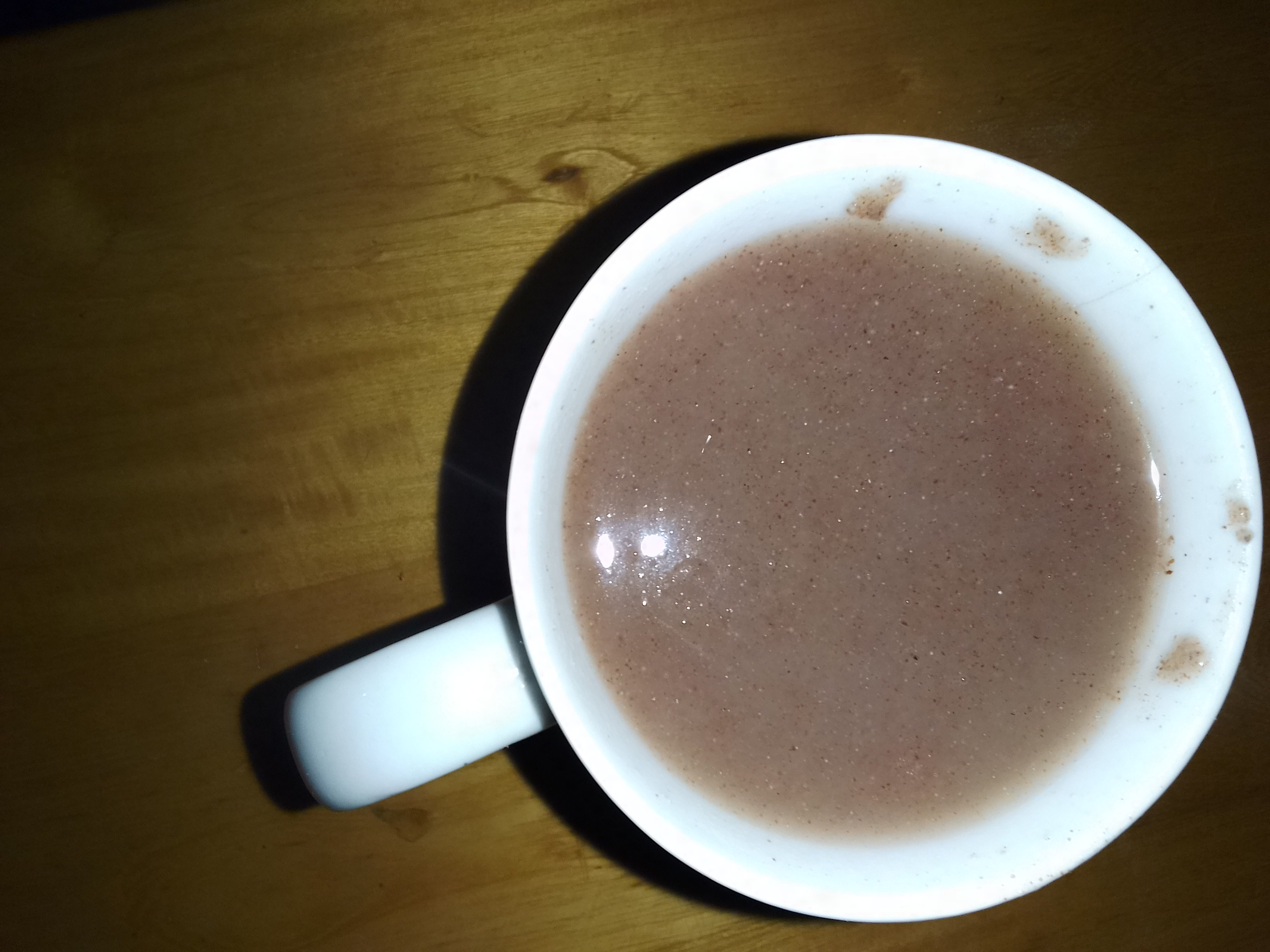
Obushera in a cup

== Production and varieties ==
Obushera is produced through the spontaneous fermentation of gelatinized slurries made from flour derived from malted or unmalted millet and/or sorghum.That is; enturire and obutoko are made from sorghum as a raw material, while ekitiribita and obuteire are made from millet mainly. The fermentation process typically lasts between 1 and 4 days, though it can extend longer depending on the desired characteristics of the final product.

Each variety of Obushera has distinct preparation methods and flavor profiles:

1. Obutoko: made by fermenting malted sorghum. It is one of the most common types of Obushera and serves as a base for other variants. It can be made using various methods.
2. Enturire: An alcoholic variant of Obushera, Enturire is produced by extending the fermentation of Obutoko and mixing it with honey. Traditional descriptions characterize it as mildly sweet and alcoholic.
3. Ekitiribita: A thin porridge-like beverage, Ekitiribita is prepared from un-malted millet and is typically consumed within 1–2 days of preparation. It is known for its light consistency and mild flavor.
4. Obuteire: produced by inoculating Ekitiribita with millet malt and fermenting it for 1–4 days. It has a thicker consistency compared to Ekitiribita and a more pronounced fermented flavor.

== Cultural significance and health benefits ==
Obushera is often consumed during social gatherings, ceremonies, and as a daily beverage. The beverages are also used as weaning foods for infants due to their perceived nutritional value.

The fermentation of Obushera preserves as it typically does not require refrigeration. Obushera usually contains protein and other micronutrients, such as vitamin A and iron. The lactic acid bacteria and yeast involved in fermentation may provide probiotic benefits and promote gut health.

== Challenges and modern adaptations ==
Despite its cultural significance, the production of Obushera faces notable challenges, such as inconsistent quality due to the spontaneous nature of fermentation and the lack of standardized production methods. Although Obushera production is becoming increasingly commercialized, the processing is still largely non-industrial as the procedure relies on chance fermentation, leading to inconsistent quality and short shelf life.
