= Mandazi =

Fried bread

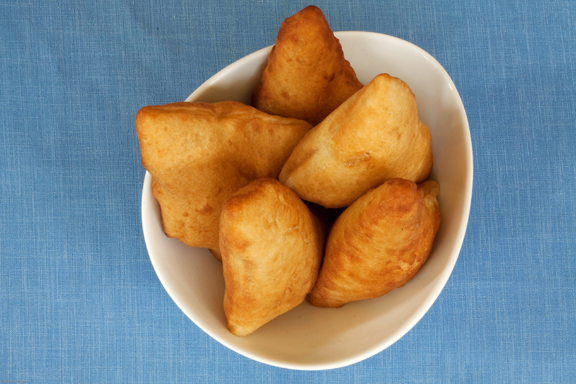
- Bowl of mandazi
- Alternative names: Swahili bun, Swahili coconut doughnut, bofrot, puff-puff, mahamri or mamri (when made with coconut milk), and Somali bur
- Place of origin: East Africa
- Region or state: Burundi, Comoros, Kenya, Malawi, Rwanda, Somalia, Tanzania, Uganda
- Serving temperature: Warm or room temperature
- Main ingredients: Water, sugar, flour, yeast, and milk (coconut milk in mahamri or mamri)
- Variations: Various ingredients added such as coconut milk, peanuts, or almonds

Mandazi (Swahili: mandazi, maandazi) is a form of fried bread that originated on the Swahili coast of East Africa. It is also known as bofrot or puff-puff in Western African countries such as Ghana and Nigeria. It is one of the principal dishes in the cuisine of the Swahili people who inhabit the coastal region of Kenya and Tanzania. The dish is popular in the region, as it is convenient to make, can be eaten with almost any food or dips or as a snack by itself, and can be saved and reheated for later consumption. In Somali cuisine, the pastry is referred to as bur (literally translating to "flour" or "dough") and is a staple during the Iftar meal in Ramadan, often served alongside Samosas.

== Characteristics ==
Mandazi are similar to doughnuts, having more of a sweet taste which can be differentiated with the addition of different ingredients. However, they are typically less sweet than the United States style of doughnuts and are usually served without any glazing or frosting. They are frequently triangular in shape (similar to samosas), but are also commonly shaped as circles or ovals. When cooked, they have a fluffy texture.

== Preparation ==
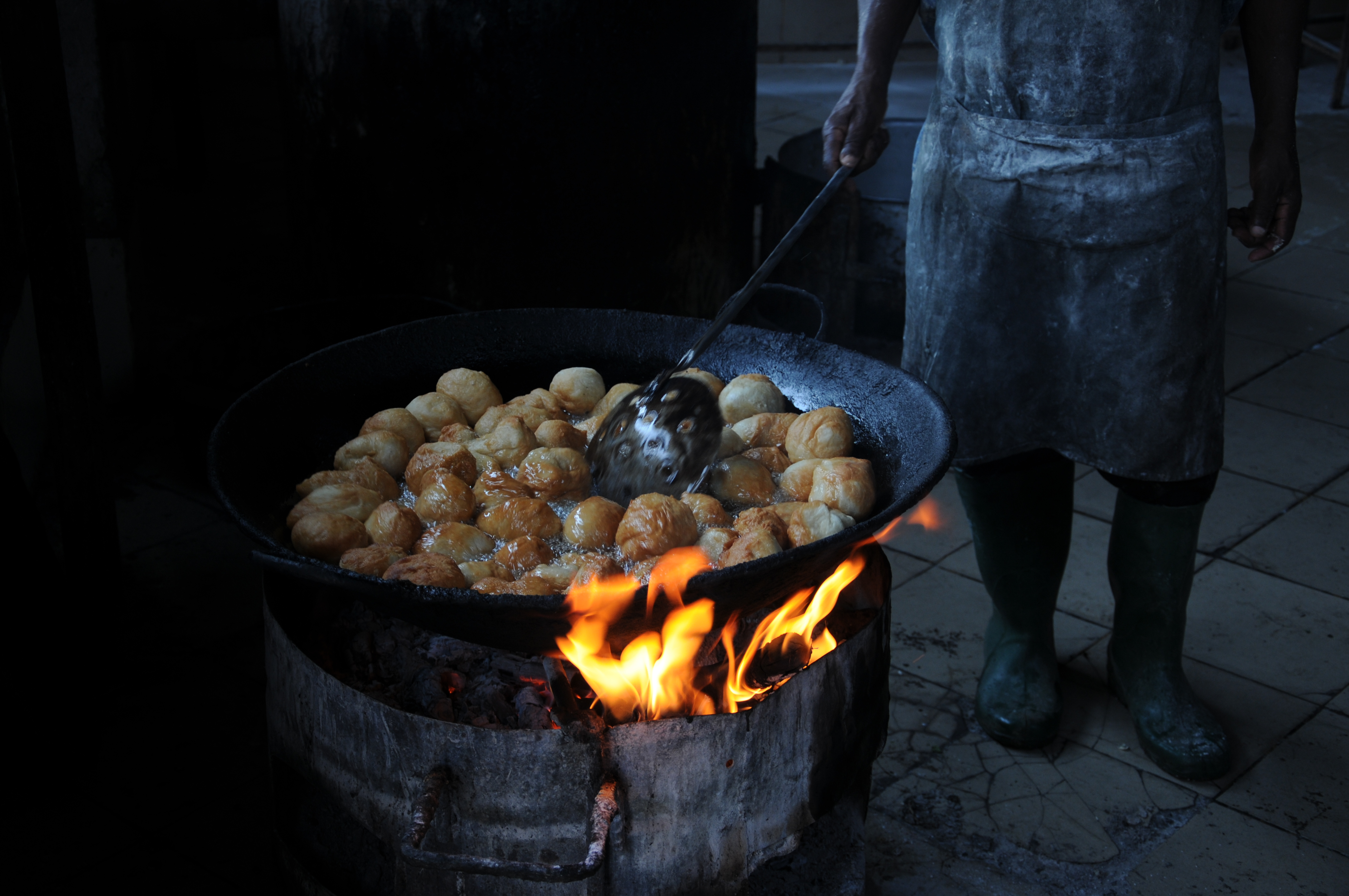
Mandazi being fried

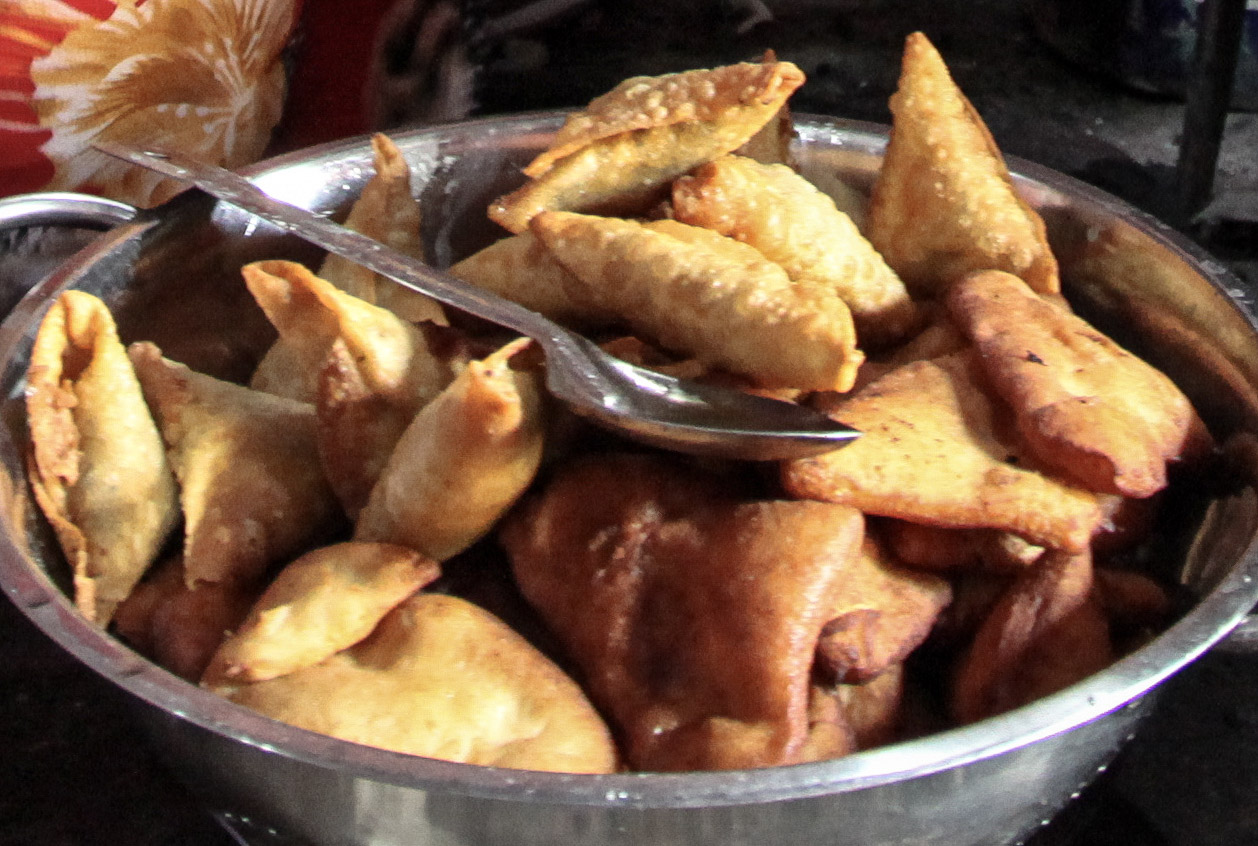
Somali bur (a fried dough pastry akin to Mandazi, right) displayed alongside Samosas in Mogadishu

Mandazi are made by briefly cooking the dough in cooking oil until it is golden brown. Coconut milk may be added for sweetness. When coconut milk is added, mandazi are commonly referred to as mahamri or mamri. Ground peanuts and almonds, among other ingredients, may be used to add a different flavor. After being cooked, they can be eaten warm or left to cool down. They are frequently prepared and eaten in the African Great Lakes region, as they can be eaten in accompaniment with many other foods. They are commonly made in the morning or the night before, eaten with breakfast, then re-heated in the evening for dinner. Mandazi are also commonly eaten with tea or fresh fruit juice, or are eaten as snacks by themselves. Different dips, often fruit-flavored, can be used to add various tastes. Mandazi may also be eaten as a dessert, served with powdered sugar or cinnamon sugar.

== See also ==
- Beignet, a similar pastry from New Orleans
- Ox-tongue pastry, a similar Chinese pastry
- List of fried dough foods
- Doughnut
- Swahili cuisine
- East African cuisine
- Mahamri
- Puff-puff
