= Burundian cuisine =

Culinary traditions of Burundi

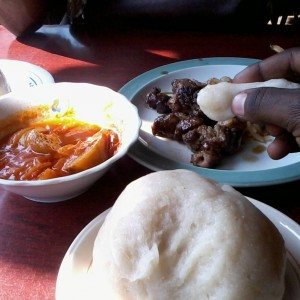
Foods at a Burundian meal

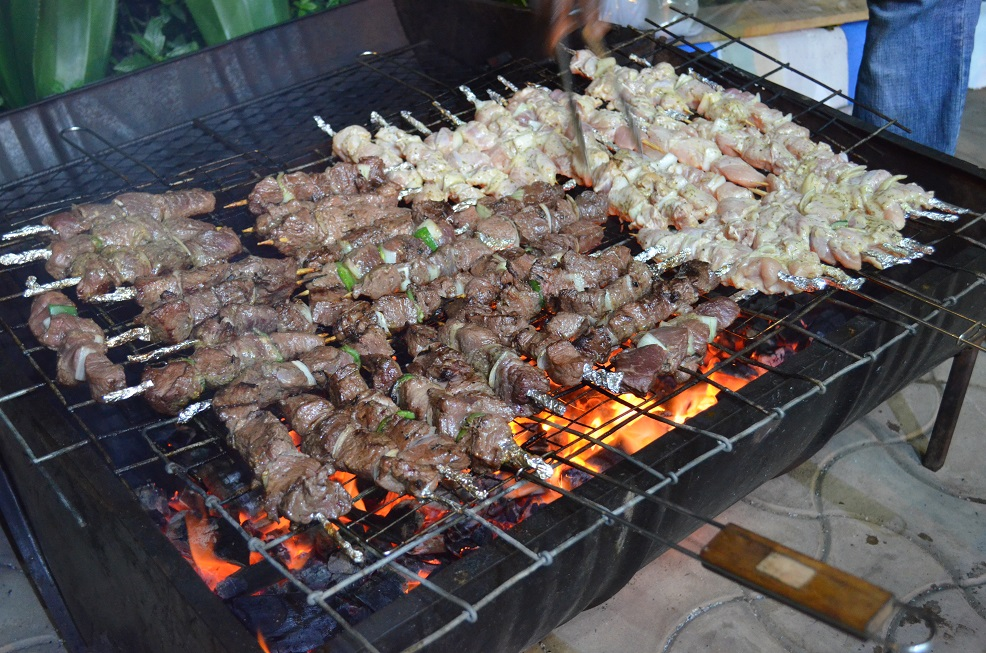
Brochettes in Burundi

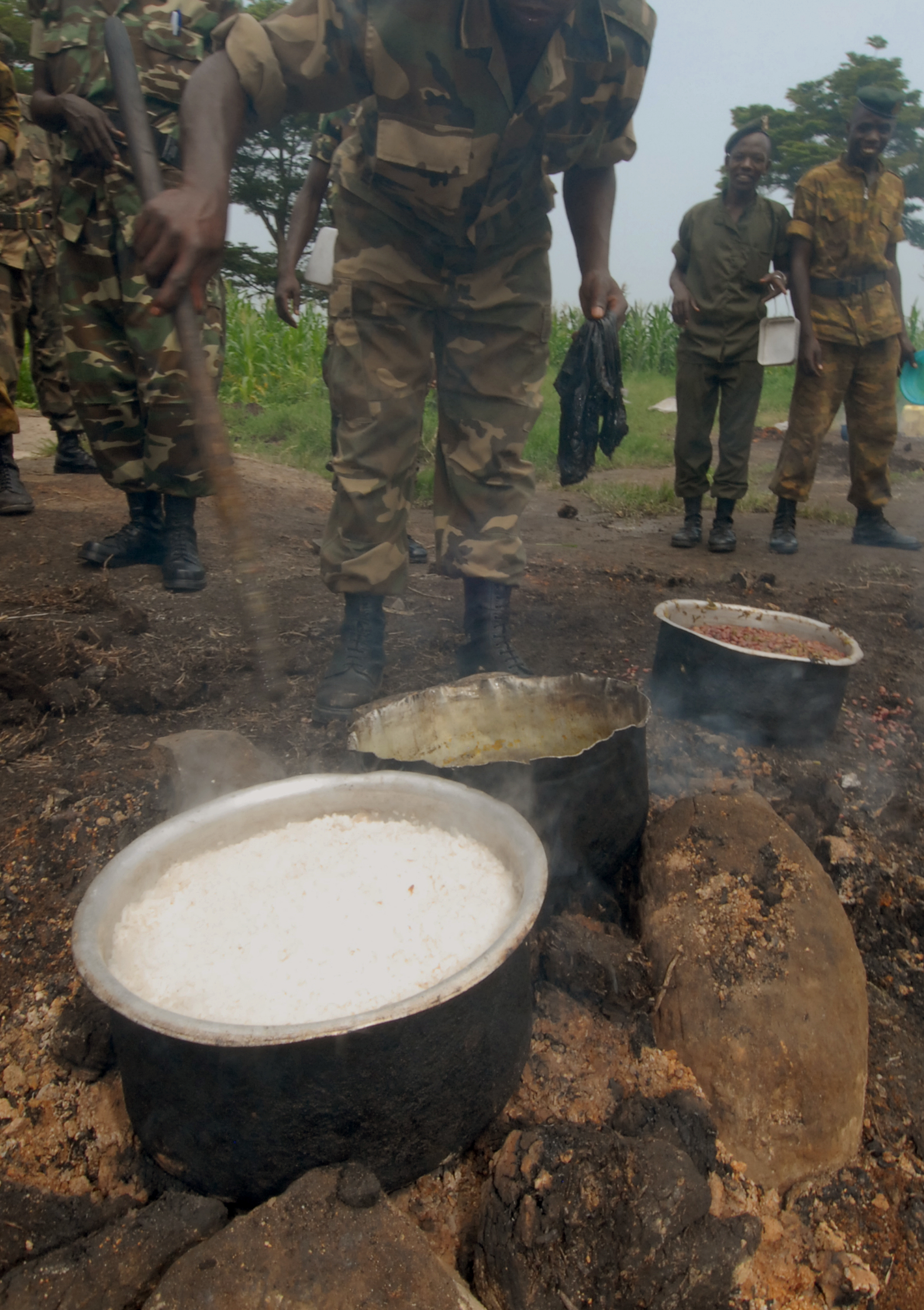
Bjumbura Burundi soldiers cooking in a sufuria over a fire

Burundi is situated in East Africa and has a territory full of mountains, savannas and agricultural fields, with forests in the surrounding rivers and waters. Agriculture is spread on 80% of the country's surface and it mainly includes coffee, tea, maize, beans and manioc. Burundi cuisine also includes beans, which are the staple of Burundi cooking, exotic fruits (mainly bananas), plantains, sweet potatoes, cassava, peas, maize, and cereals, like corn and wheat.

The Burundian people usually eat homemade food, from homemade vessels also used for drinking, carrying water and storing grain. Food security remains a major problem in Burundi.

== Ingredients ==
Most of Burundi's dishes are soups that consist of a variety of foods, spices, and herbs, such as:

- Bananas
- Beans
- Cabbage
- Fish
- Goat meat
- Sheep
- Maize
- Onions
- Palm oil
- Plantains
- Sweet potato

== Typical dishes ==
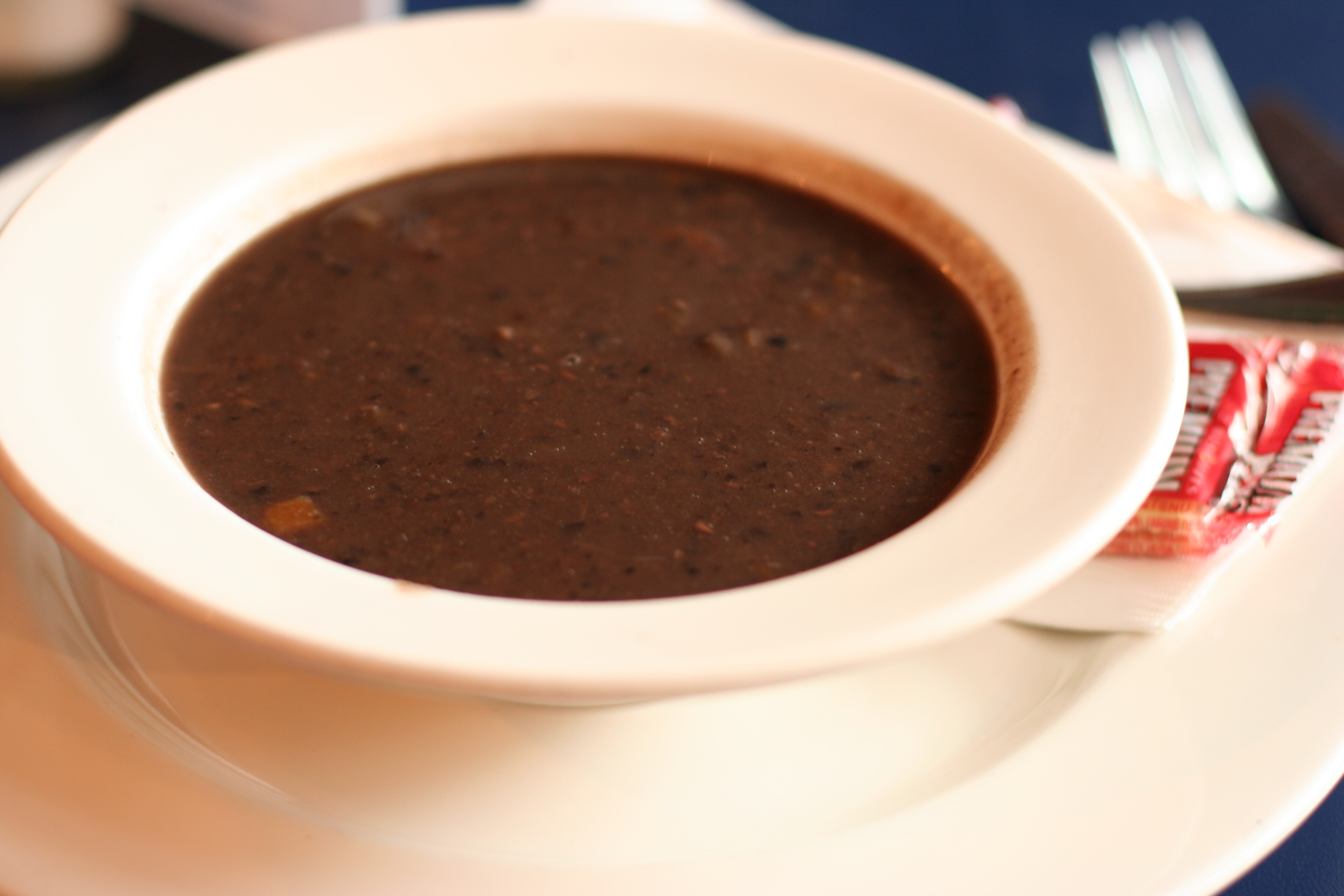
Bean soup. Soups are common in Burundian cuisine.

- Ugali—maize or cassava flour porridge
- Curry
- Maharagwe—bean soup
- Ibiharage—fried beans
- Beans and bananas
- Bean soup
- Matura and mahu—type of sausage
- Boko Boko harees

== See also ==
- African cuisine
