= Lakatan banana =

Banana cultivar

Musa acuminata 'Lakatan'
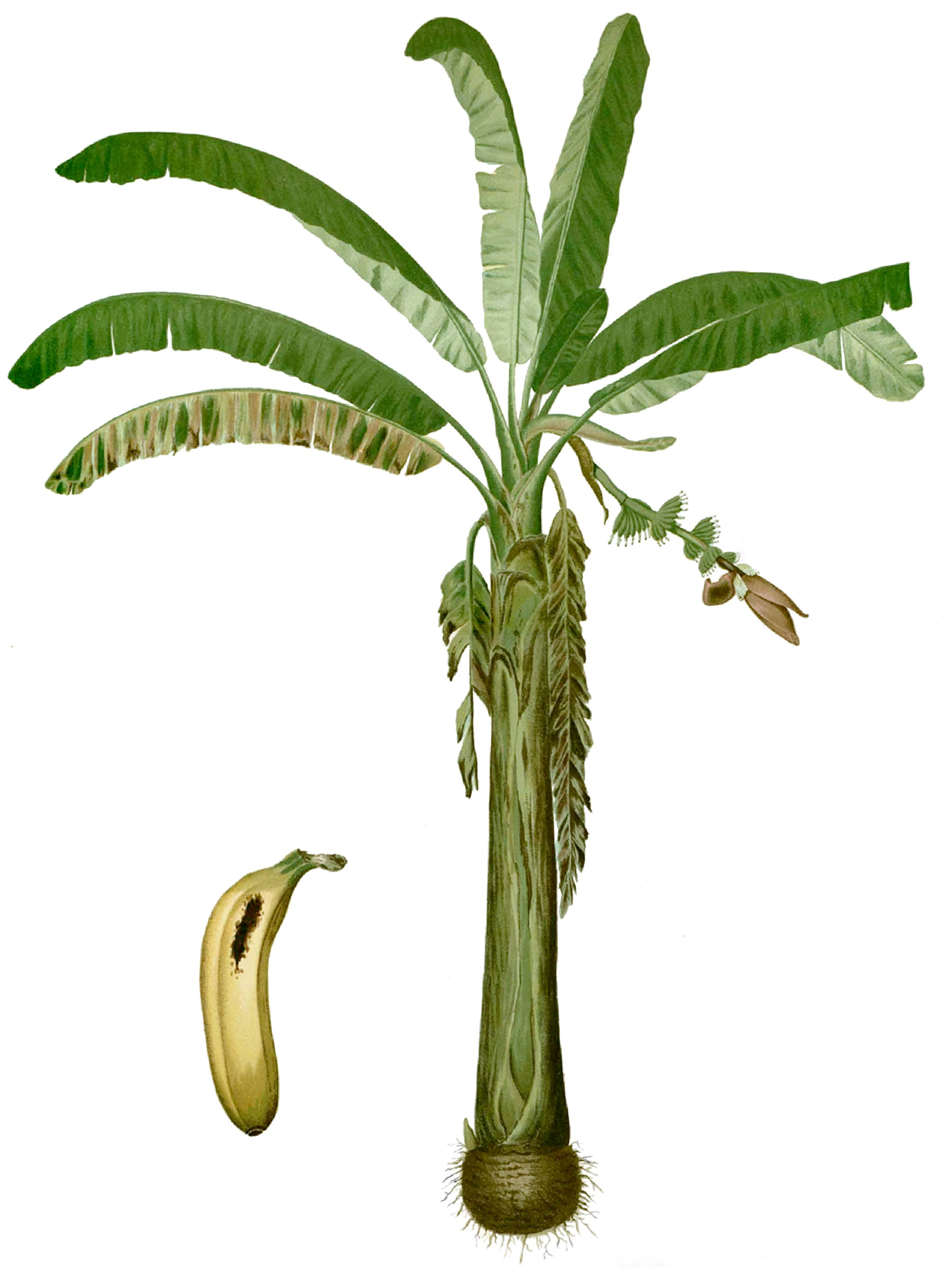
- Lakatan illustration in the 1880 book Flora de Filipinas by Francisco Manuel Blanco
- Species: Musa acuminata
- Cultivar group: AA Group
- Cultivar: 'Lakatan'
- Origin: Philippines, Malaysia, Indonesia, Thailand

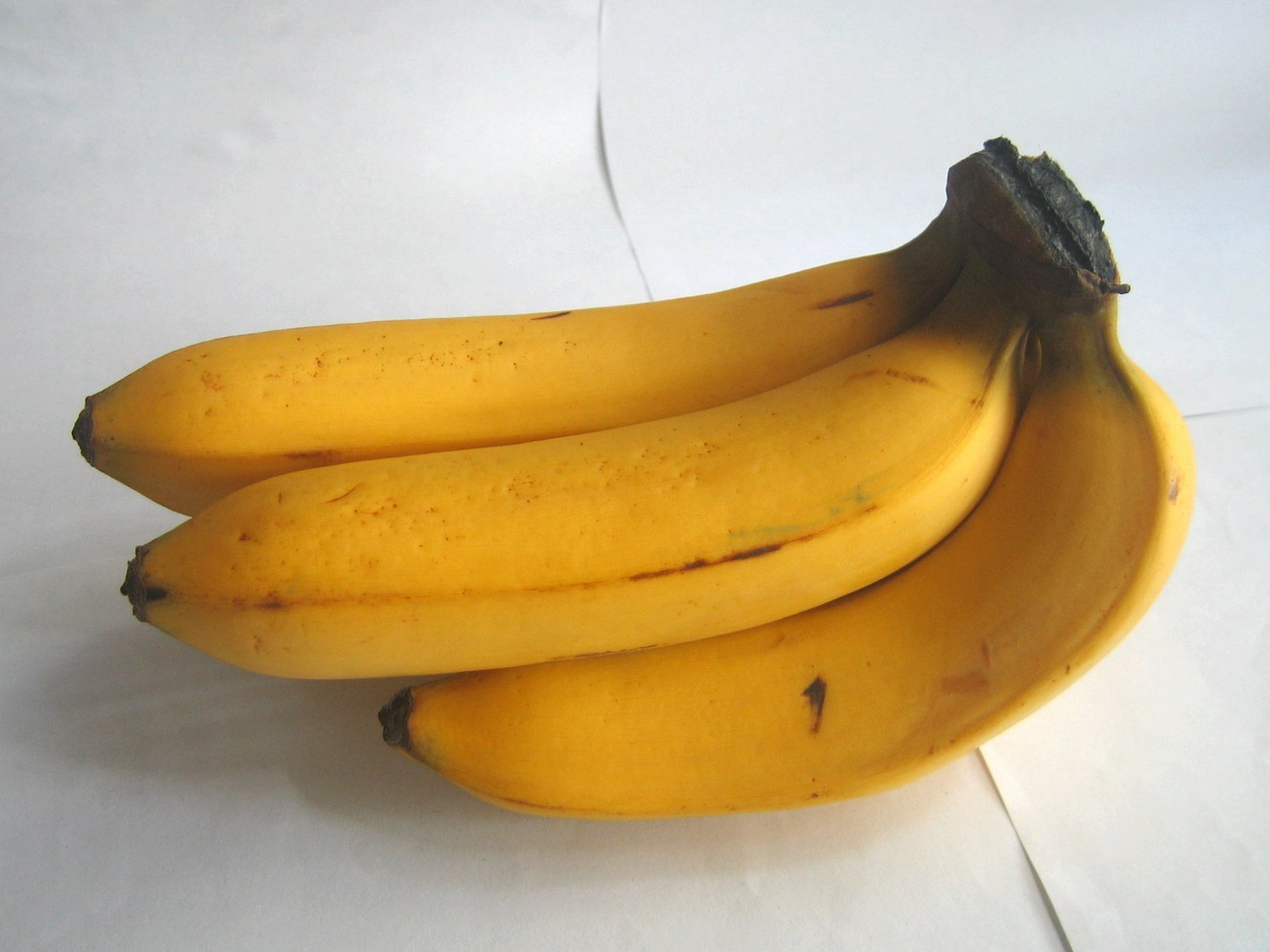
Lakatan bananas

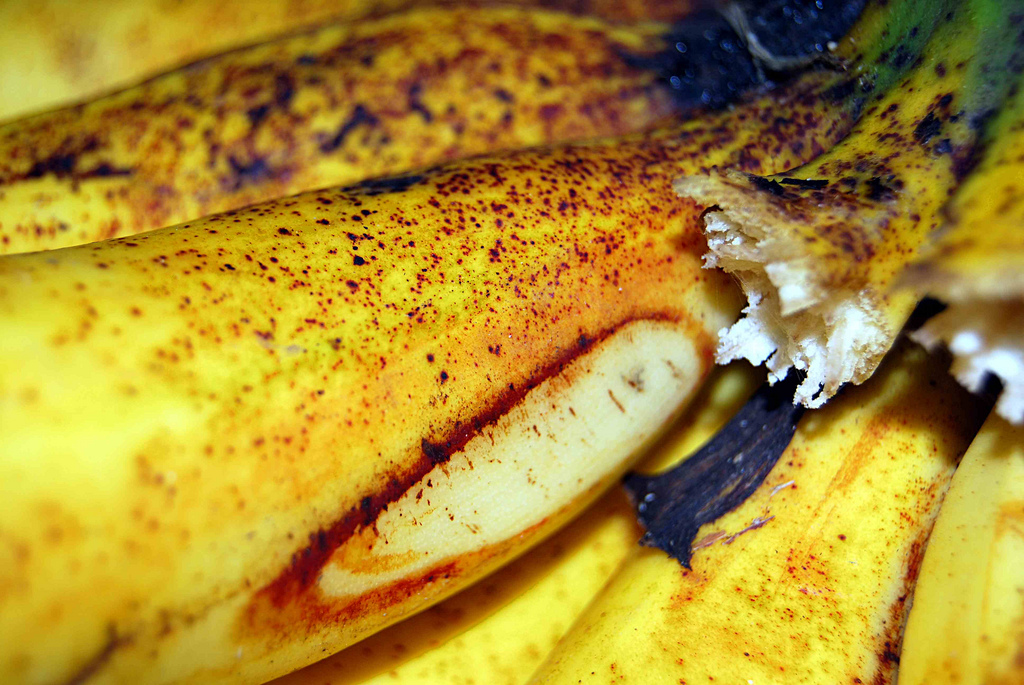
Close up of Lakatan bananas.

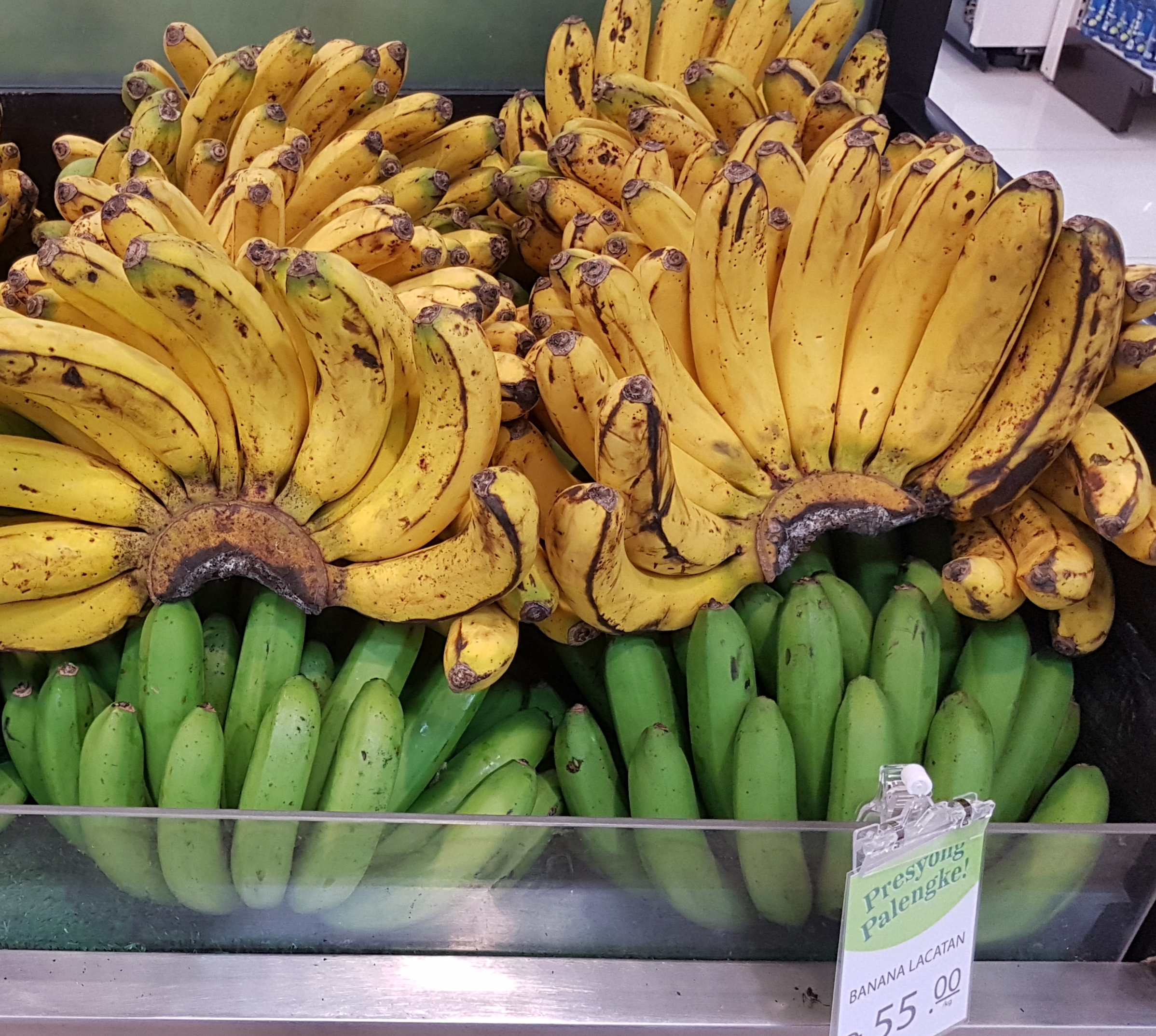
Lakatan bananas sold in the market

Lakatan bananas, also spelled Lacatan, are diploid banana cultivars from the Philippines. It is one of the most common banana cultivars in the Philippines, along with the Latundan and Saba bananas.

Lakatan bananas should not be confused with the Cavendish banana Masak Hijau, which is also known as "Lacatan" in Latin America and the West Indies.

== Taxonomy and nomenclature ==
The Lakatan banana is a diploid (AA) cultivar. According to Promusa, it is a triploid (AAA)

Its official designation is Musa acuminata (AA Group) 'Lakatan'.

Synonyms include:

- Musa x paradisiaca L. ssp. sapientum (L.) Kuntze var. lacatan Blanco
- Musa acuminata Colla (Cavendish Group) cv. 'Lacatan'

The Cavendish cultivar Masak Hijau is also called "Lacatan" in Latin America and the West Indies, and is known as "Bungulan" in the Philippines. To avoid confusion, the Philippine Lakatan is usually spelled with a 'k' in botanical literature, while Masak Hijau is usually spelled with a 'c' (Lacatan) or called "Jamaican Lacatan". Other common names for the cultivar in Southeast Asia include "Pisang Berangan" in Malaysia; "Pisang Barangan Kuning" and "Pisang Barangan Merah" in Indonesia; "Kluai Hom Maew" and "Kluai Nga Phaya" in Thailand.

== Description ==
Lakatan typically grows to a height of 150 to 300 centimeters. The fruits can be harvested 8 to 12 months after planting. Lakatan is susceptible to the Banana Bunchy Top virus.

Lakatan fruits are longer and thicker-skinned than the Latundan bananas and turn a characteristic yellow-orange when ripe.

== Uses ==
Lakatan is the most popular dessert banana in the Philippines. It is more expensive than the more common Latundan and Cavendish bananas. Latundan and Lakatan bananas are both preferred by Filipinos over Cavendish.

They have higher β-Carotene content than other banana cultivars.

== Diseases ==
- Banana bunchy top virus

== See also ==
- Banana
- Banana cultivar groups
- Masak Hijau banana
- Musa
- Musa acuminata
