= Monoculture =

Farms producing only one crop at a time

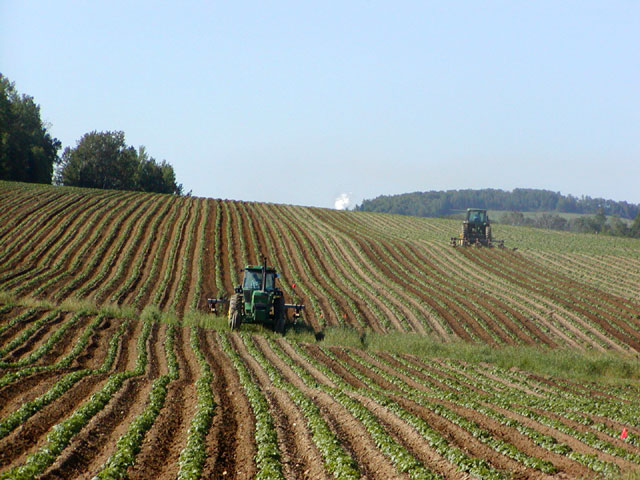
Monocultural potato field

In agriculture, monoculture is the practice of growing one crop species in a field at a time. Monocultures increase ease and efficiency in planting, managing, and harvesting crops short-term, often with the help of machinery. However, monocultures are more susceptible to diseases or pest outbreaks long-term due to localized reductions in biodiversity and nutrient depletion. Crop diversity can be added both in time, as with a crop rotation or sequence, or in space, with a polyculture or intercropping. Monoculture practices have been linked via several pathways to negatively impact human health from a One Health perspective. These links include but are not limited to environmental degradation, increased pest and disease outbreaks, greater pesticide/herbicide use, and reductions in dietary diversity (associated with diet-related disease burden including cardiovascular disease and diabetes).

Monocultures appear in contexts outside of agriculture and food production. Grass lawns are a common form of residential monocultures. Several monocultures, including single-species forest plantations, have become increasingly abundant throughout the tropics following market globalization, impacting local communities.

Genetic monocultures refer to crops that have little to no genetic variation. This is achieved using cultivars, made through processes of propagation and selective breeding, and can make populations susceptible to diseases which can rapidly spread across large areas. This widespread susceptibility ultimately endangers food security for regions dependent on such food supply.

Agroecological practices, silvo-pastoral systems, and mixed-species plantations are common alternatives to monoculture that help preserve biodiversity while maintaining productivity. These practices offer resilience to possible negative human and environmental health impacts.

== Agriculture ==
Agricultural monocultures refer to the practice of planting one crop species in a field. Monoculture is widely used in intensive farming and in organic farming. In crop monocultures, each plant in a field has the same standardized planting, maintenance, and harvesting requirements resulting in greater yields and lower costs. When a crop is matched to its well-managed environment, a monoculture can produce higher yields than a polyculture. Modern practices such as monoculture planting and the use of synthesized fertilizers have reduced the amount of additional land needed to produce food, called land sparing.

Diversity of crops in space and time; monocultures and polycultures, and rotations of both.
			Diversity in time		
			Low	Higher	
			Low	Cyclic	Dynamic (non-cyclic)
Diversity in space	Low	Monoculture, one species in a field	Continuous monoculture, monocropping	Crop rotation (rotation of monocultures)	Sequence of monocultures
Diversity in space	Higher	Polyculture, two or more species intermingled in a field (intercropping)	Continuous polyculture	Rotation of polycultures	Sequence of polycultures

Note that the distinction between monoculture and polyculture is not the same as between monocropping and intercropping. The first two describe diversity in space, as does intercropping. Monocropping and crop rotation describe diversity over time.

=== Environmental impacts ===
Monocultures of perennials, such as African palm oil, sugarcane, tea and pines, can change soil chemistry leading to soil acidification, degradation, and soil-borne diseases, ultimately having a negative impact on agricultural productivity and sustainability. The use of unregulated irrigation practices on popular monocultures, such as soy, can also lead to erosion and water loss.

As soil health declines, use of synthetic fertilizers on monocultural fields increases, often having negative implications on human health via chemical run-off. For example, excess nitrogen from synthetic fertilizers can leach into ground and surface waters, leading to nitrate contamination of drinking water. This contamination is associated with serious health risks such as methemoglobinemia ("blue baby syndrome") and the formation of carcinogenic compounds such as nitrosamines within the human digestive system.

Agricultural runoff can also degrade aquatic ecosystems through nutrient loading, which subsequently leads to eutrophication harmful algal blooms (HABs). This process can compromise water quality and safety as these blooms produce potent cyanotoxins such as microcystin, which can bioaccumulate in fish and shellfish. Human consumption can ultimately lead to liver damage, neurotoxicity, and gastrointestinal illness.

In addition to soil depletion, monocultures can cause significant reductions in biodiversity due to unavailability of resources, native species displacement, and loss of genetic variation. Following large-scale oil palm plantations in Latin America, research has revealed extensive declines in mammal, bird, amphibian, and pollinator diversity, particularly in Colombia and Brazil.

Due to insufficient biodiversity and population balance, monocultures are associated with higher rates of disease and pest outbreaks. In response, pesticides are widely applied to agricultural fields, further harming insect and pollinator diversity and human health. Increasing rotations of crop monocultures or using alternatives agricultural practices can help mitigate the risk of disease and attack.

=== Social impacts ===
Environmental consequences of monocultural farming have notable social impacts, commonly concentrated to the reduction of small-scale farmers and pesticide-related health issues. Monoculture is contradictive to several primitive, more sustainable farming practices utilized by small-scale farmers. Following pest outbreaks, over 600 million liters of pesticides are sprayed annually, contaminating nearby small-scale farming and causing communal health decline. This link between monoculture practices, increased pesticide use, and subsequent human health risks can be illustrated well by a One Health perspective, which emphasizes the interconnectedness of environmental and human health. Chronic exposure to commonly used pesticides has been associated with various negative health outcomes, including neurological disorders such as Alzheimer's disease and amyotrophic lateral sclerosis, brain tumors, leukemia, non-Hodgkin lymphoma, and a wide range of other gastrointestinal, dermatological, and respiratory illnesses. Notably, the burden of exposure to such pesticides disproportionately affects vulnerable populations including agricultural workers, their families (including children), and residents of nearby communities. These disparities underscore the importance of environmental justice within the One Health framework.

Monoculture practices also influence human diets in ways that can negatively impact human health. The global expansion of monoculture practices has led to the selection of staple crops such as wheat, rice, soy, corn, and sugar on an international level. This has reduced dietary diversity around the world and has promoted calorie-dense but nutrient-poor foods. This change in human dietary patterns has been associated with a decreased intake of essential micronutrients, contributing simultaneously to both nutritional deficiencies as well as overnutrition-related non-communicable diseases such as obesity and type 2 diabetes. Monoculture systems prioritize high-yield crops that can be converted into ultra-processed foods, reinforcing dietary trends towards refined carbohydrates, sugars, and unhealthy fats. Within a One Health perspective, these changes illustrate how agricultural practices can profoundly reduce diversity within the human diet and negatively impact human health outcomes.

== Agro-extractivism ==
Agro-extractivism is a form of extractivism in which foreign territorial, political, and economical dominance over agriculture is motivated by the large-scale production and exportation of agricultural commodities, often in the form of monocultures.

Several monocultures in the Global South, such as sugar and coffee, were first planted in the 1800s following European colonization. These plantations used slave labor, setting a precedent for agriculture being a field dominated by foreign entities in the rest of Latin America and the Caribbean. This social framework has shaped the oppression of Black people and smaller-scale farmers in the face of present-day land acquisition for monocultural use.

The large-scale establishment of monocultures in the tropics has led to hindrance of local small-scale farms and indigenous land rights in the forms of reduced food sovereignty, food security, land and water access, and hunting. Land privatization and pressure for monocultural expansion by larger companies takes different forms: silent evictions, violence, and reverse leasing arrangements. Introduction to global trade makes small-scale farmers vulnerable to international demand, prices, and variations in climate affecting crop production. Farmers who make contracts or take out loans with large corporations can face debt and loss of land if they fail to meet certain crop yields or profit.

Monocultures are an aspect of agro-extractivism on account of high percentages of the produced crop being exported for processing and marketing by large transnational corporations, often in developed countries. For instance, following the North American Free Trade Agreement (NAFTA), agave production increased three-fold in Mexico from 1995 to 2019 due to foreign consumption, specifically by the United States. Pararguay sees similar demands with soy crops, exporting the majority of production without nutrients returning to native soil. More than 46 million hectares of soy has been planted across South America while over half a million hectares of land are being deforested annually to make land for cultivation. Some international companies relevant in the field of agro-extractivist monocultures are Syngenta and Bayer (biotech), Los Grobo, CRESUD, El Tejar, and Maggi (landowners), and Cargill, ADM, and Bunge (grain and seed providers).

From a One Health perspective, such monoculture practices contribute to soil nutrient depletion, which has subsequent effects on the ecosystem and ultimately, human health. Repeated cultivation of a single crop exhausts soil nutrients and reduces microbial diversity, thereby diminishing soil fertility and increasing dependence on synthetic fertilizers. This degradation of soil quality not only jeopardizes long-term productivity, but also reduces the nutritional quality of crops, with the nutrient-poor soil inherently yielding foods with reduced nutrient density. In populations that rely heavily on staple crops, deficiencies in essential micronutrients such as zinc or iron can contribute to malnutrition-related health issues. Within a One Health framework, this illustrates how soil degradation driven by monoculture or similar practices can be directly linked to negative human health outcomes.

== Forestry ==
In forestry, monoculture refers to plantations of one species of tree. In many areas of the world, forest monocultures are planted as an efficient way to produce and harvest timber. Because timber harvest from monoculture forests is often an export-driven industry, these plantations can be a form of extractivism. Following deforestation, monoculture afforestation has become increasingly popular due to the necessity for ecosystem services, such as mitigating the effects of climate change via carbon sequestration and gas regulation. Eucalyptus, pines, and acacias are examples of popular monocultures being utilized in the tropics and the Global South following rainforest deforestation.

These climate change mitigation strategies may have global benefit but can incidentally incur environmental and human health harm at a local level when viewed through a One Health lens. Tree monoculture often utilizes imported/exotic species such as eucalyptus or pine, ultimately replacing native forests. This disruption can lead to soil depletion and altered water cycles, exacerbating local water and food scarcity issues.. Despite the intentions to provide ecological benefit when it comes to climate change, monoculture forestry can inadvertently compromise environmental, animal, and human health in the regions where is most heavily implemented. This emphasizes the importance of the One Health perspective regarding climate justice and seeking equitable approaches to climate change action.

=== Environmental impacts ===
While forest monocultures are efficient ways of producing timber, studies show single-species forests reduce biodiversity, causing declines in forest productivity and native tree, animal, and insect populations over time. The loss of biodiversity in forest monocultures is associated with lower forest resistance to pathogens, attack by insects, and adverse environmental conditions, such as an acceleration of pyrolysis.

=== Social impacts ===
Monoculture plantations have been shown to have substantial social impacts on local communities. Forest monocultures have motivated migrations across Latin America due to localized water cycle interference, declining soil health, and changes in resource availability. While industrial agriculture can increase employment opportunities, studies show forest plantations often have limited employment opportunities, with most workers coming from outside of the community. Profits made from monoculture plantations historically follow a "boom and bust" trend, temporarily benefitting the community in increased income, revenue, and quality of life until resources are exhausted, with profits rarely distributed back into the deforested land.

Environmental changes caused by monoculture forests are particularly felt among indigenous communities given their reliance and connection to the land while additionally becoming subject to land privatization. These lands are frequently acquired through land grabbing and dispossession by large companies in global trade, ultimately reducing rural land, cutting off access to locals, and changing agricultural and community dynamics.

== Residential monoculture ==
Lawn monoculture in the United States was historically influenced by English gardens and manor-house landscapes, but its inception into the American landscape is fairly recent. Aesthetics drove the evolution of the residential green areas, with turfgrass becoming a popular addition to many American homes. Turfgrass is a nonnative species and requires high levels of maintenance. At the local level, governments and organizations, such as Homeowner Associations, have pressured the maintenance of lawn aesthetics and influenced real estate value. Disagreements in residential maintenance of weeds and lawns have resulted in civil cases or direct aggression against neighbors.

High levels of maintenance required for turfgrass created a growing demand for chemical management, i.e. pesticides, herbicides, insecticides. A 1999 study showed that in a sample of urban streams, at least one type of pesticide was found in 99% of the streams. A major risk associated with lawn pesticide use is the exposure to chemicals within the home through the air, clothing, and furniture, which can be more detrimental to children than to the average adult.

Aside from pesticide/chemical exposure, residential monocultures such as turfgrass lawns can also negatively impact human health through increased allergen production, worsening of urban heat islands, and a high demand for irrigated water. Grass pollen concentration, associated with extensive uniform lawns, has been shown to consistently induce symptoms of allergic rhinitis and other impairments, ranging from inconveniences to significant disruptions in daily quality of life. Additionally, lawns often replace trees within residential spaces, ultimately reducing the heat mitigation effects offered by a tree's canopy. This can exacerbate urban heat islands, leading to an increase in heat-related illnesses and cardiovascular stress during hot seasons, particularly among vulnerable populations such as the elderly and young children.

Furthermore, turfgrass lawns often require significant irrigation to supplement what local ecosystems can naturally sustain, particularly in arid regions. This leads to an increased pressure on freshwater resources and reliance on external water sources. This elevated water demand contributes to water scarcity and reductions in water quality, as pollutants are concentrated or introduced into the water supply via runoff. These conditions have been linked to reduced sanitation, waterborne disease such as cholera, and dehydration, especially in communities facing limited water access. These dynamics, when viewed from a One Health perspective, help to elucidate how residential land use can strain environmental resources and compromise human health and well-being.

== Genetic monocultures ==
While often referring to the production of the same crop species in a field (space), monoculture can also refer to the planting of a single cultivar across a larger regional area, such that there are numerous plants in the area with an identical genetic makeup to each other. When all plants in a region are genetically similar, a disease to which they have no resistance can destroy entire populations of crops. As of 2009 the wheat leaf rust fungus caused much concern internationally, having already severely affected wheat crops in Uganda and Kenya, and having started to spread in Asia as well. Given the very genetically similar strains of much of the world's wheat crops following the Green Revolution, the impacts of such diseases threaten agricultural production worldwide.

Genetic monoculture in the global food supply chain represents a significant threat to food security. Loss of biodiversity within staple crops results in agricultural practices that are highly vulnerable to pests, pathogens, and environmental stressors. Disease outbreak or climate-related stresses can rapidly spread, leading to widespread crop losses, as seen with the historical examples below. Such famines represent direct threats to human health, with the connections between health and biodiversity better appreciated through the lens of a One Health model.

=== Historic examples of genetic monocultures ===
==== Great Famine of Ireland ====
In Ireland, exclusive use of one variety of potato, the "lumper", led to the Great Famine of 1845–1849. Lumpers provided inexpensive food to feed the Irish masses. Potatoes were propagated vegetatively with little to no genetic variation. When Phytophthora infestans arrived in Ireland from the Americas in 1845, the lumper had no resistance to the disease, leading to the nearly complete failure of the potato crop across Ireland.

==== Bananas ====
Until the 1950s, the Gros Michel cultivar of banana represented almost all bananas consumed in the United States because of their taste, small seeds, and efficiency to produce. Their small seeds, while more appealing than the large ones in other Asian cultivars, were not suitable for planting, meaning all new banana plants had to be grown from the cut suckers of another plant. As a result of this asexual form of planting, all bananas grown had identical genetic makeups and which gave them no traits for resistance to Fusarium wilt, a fungal disease that spread quickly throughout the Caribbean where they were being grown.

By the beginning of the 1960s, growers had to switch to growing the Cavendish banana, a cultivar grown in a similar way. This cultivar is under similar disease stress since all the bananas are clones of each other and could easily succumb as the Gros Michel did.

==== Cattle ====
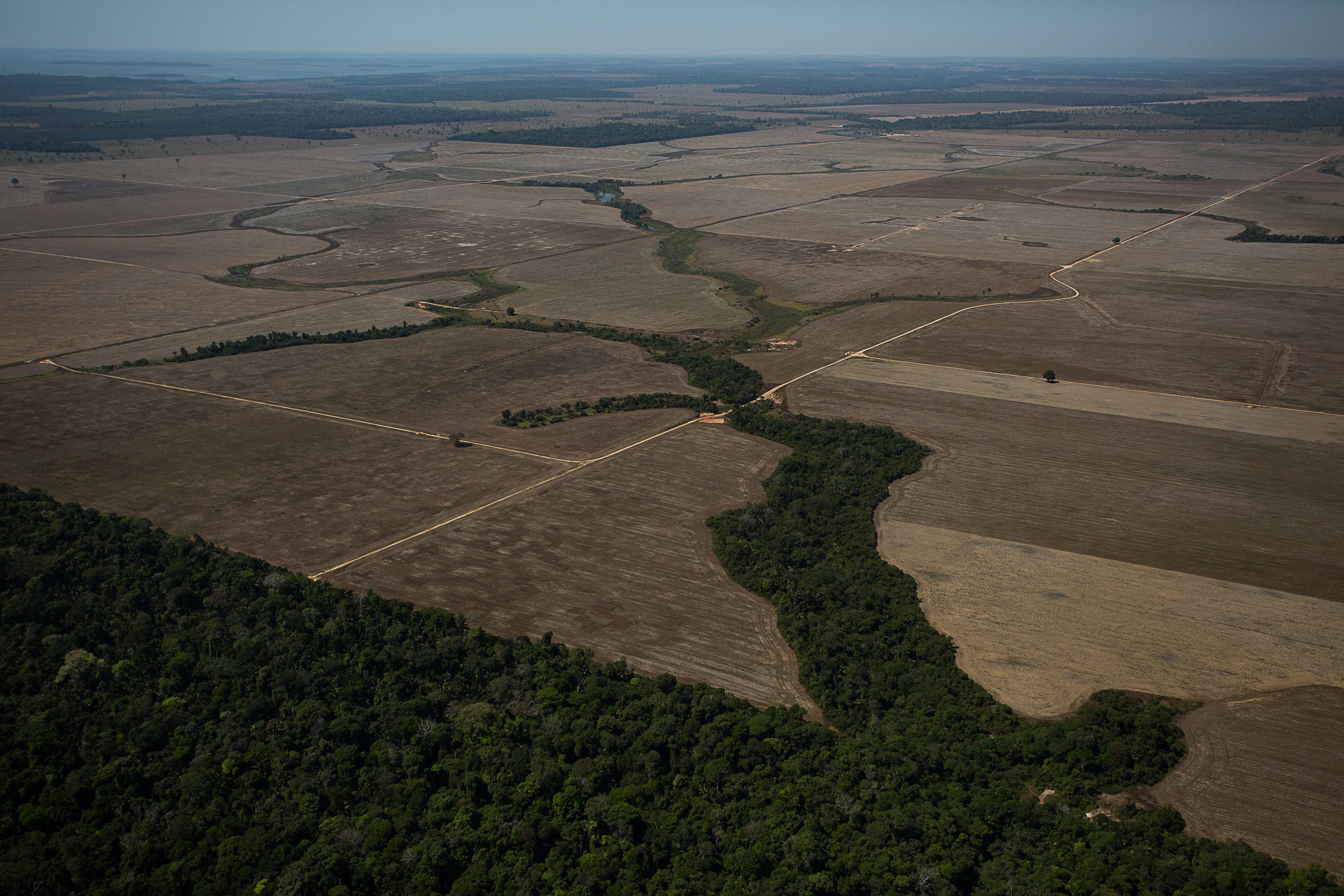
Aerial view of deforested area prepared for monoculture or cattle ranching, near Porto Velho in Rondônia, Brazil, in 2020

Genetic monoculture can also refer to a single breed of farm animal being raised in large-scale concentrated animal feeding operations (CAFOs). Many livestock production systems rely on just a small number of highly specialized breeds. Focusing heavily on a single trait (output) may come at the expense of other desirable traits – such as fertility, resistance to disease, vigor, and mothering instincts. In the early 1990s, a few Holstein calves were observed to grow poorly and died in the first 6 months of life. They were all found to be homozygous for a mutation in the gene that caused bovine leukocyte adhesion deficiency. This mutation was found at a high frequency in Holstein populations worldwide. (15% among bulls in the US, 10% in Germany, and 16% in Japan.) Researchers studying the pedigrees of affected and carrier animals tracked the source of the mutation to a single bull that was widely used in livestock production. In 1990 there were approximately 4 million Holstein cattle in the US, making the affected population around 600,000 animals.

=== Benefits of genetic diversity ===
Increasing genetic diversity through the introduction of organisms with varying genes can make agricultural and livestock systems more sustainable. By utilizing crops with varying genetic traits for disease and pest resistance, chances of disease outbreak decrease due to the likelihood of neighboring plants having strain-resistant genes. This can aid in increasing crop productivity while decreasing pesticide usage.

== Alternatives to monoculture ==
Alternatives to monoculture include the consultation of agroecology, silvo-pastoral systems, and mixed-species plantations.

=== Agroecology ===
Agroecology consults the entire food system, considering how agricultural inputs and outputs affect social, environmental, and economic systems. Despite the recent dominance of GMO monoculture crop rotations of soy, corn, and cotton across the deforested Amazon, many Afrodescendant-run farms in Brazil continue to use traditional practices of agroecology that have the capacity to sustain the local community, environment, and economy. Ecosystem-specific ecological damage done by monocultural practices and byproducts, including the use of biocides and soil degradation, can be irreparable. However, the increasing modern prevalence of regenerative farming reinstates crop rotation and natural nutrient cycling to repair biodiversity and improve soil productivity.

=== Silvopasture ===
Silvopasture is a traditional practice that incorporates the use of various trees and forage in pastures to increase land and livestock productivity. Incorporating other plants in pastures, such as tree legumes, has been shown to enhance pollinator activity, benefitting local biodiversity and food security. Silvopastoral systems provide greater pasture species richness and grazing feed, increasing economic and environmental outcomes on various size scales.

=== Mixed-species plantations ===
In several studies, well-managed mixed-species plantations have been shown to produce greater economic outcomes than monocultures with regard to timber sales. Mixed-species forests are also associated with greater carbon sequestration and biodiversity, presenting a possible mitigation tactic against the climate crisis and current global carbon levels. However, mixed-species plantations are less common under the misconception of being more expensive and harder to manage.

== See also ==
- Biodiversity
- Cash crop
- Crop diversity
- Crop rotation
- Genetically modified organism
- Intensive crop farming
- Permaculture
