= Gros Michel =

Banana cultivar

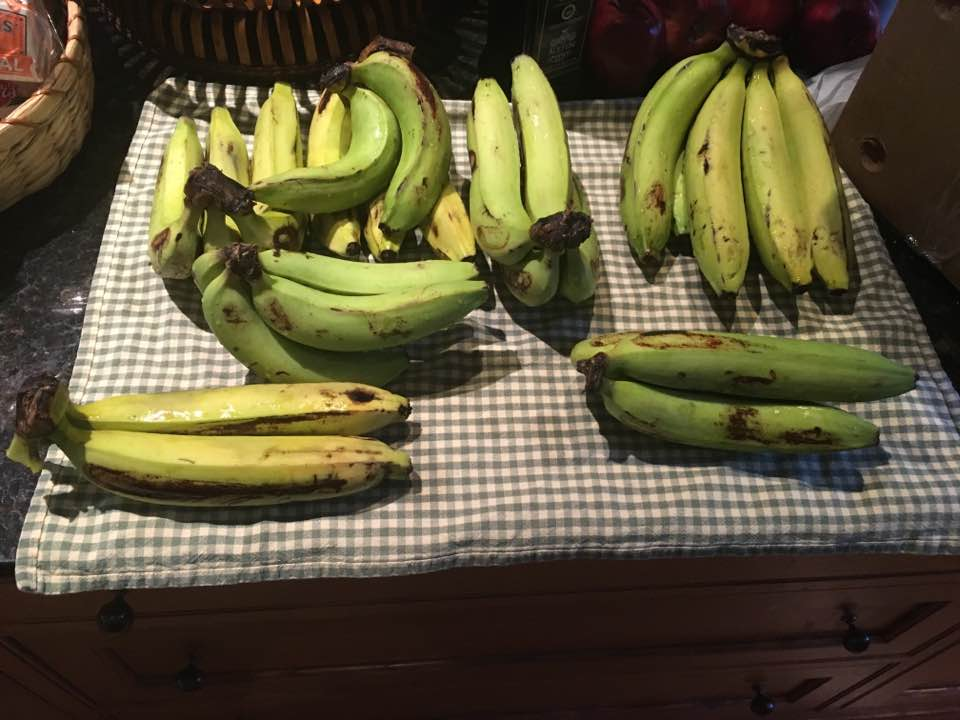
- Gros Michel bananas in various stages of ripening
- Species: Musa acuminata
- Cultivar group: AAA Group
- Cultivar: Gros Michel
- Origin: Native to Southeast Asia, selectively cultivated in Martinique, Jamaica

Gros Michel (French pronunciation: [ɡʁo miʃɛl]), often translated and known as "Big Mike", is an export cultivar of banana and was, until the 1950s, the main variety grown. The physical properties of the Gros Michel make it an excellent export produce; its thick peel makes it resilient to bruising during transport and the dense bunches that it grows in make it easy to ship. However, due to its vulnerability to Panama disease, it has been almost entirely replaced in the banana industry by the Cavendish cultivar.

== Taxonomy ==
Gros Michel is a triploid cultivar of the wild banana Musa acuminata, belonging to the AAA group.

Its official designation is Musa acuminata (AAA Group) 'Gros Michel'.

Synonyms include:

- Musa acuminata L. cv. 'Gros Michel'
- Musa × paradisiaca L. cv. 'Gros Michel'

Gros Michel is known as Guineo Gigante, Banano, and Plátano Roatán in Spanish. It is also known as Thihmwe in Burmese, กล้วยหอมทอง (Kluai hom thong) in Thailand, Pisang Ambon in Malay, and Chuối tiêu cao in Vietnamese.

== Cultivation history ==
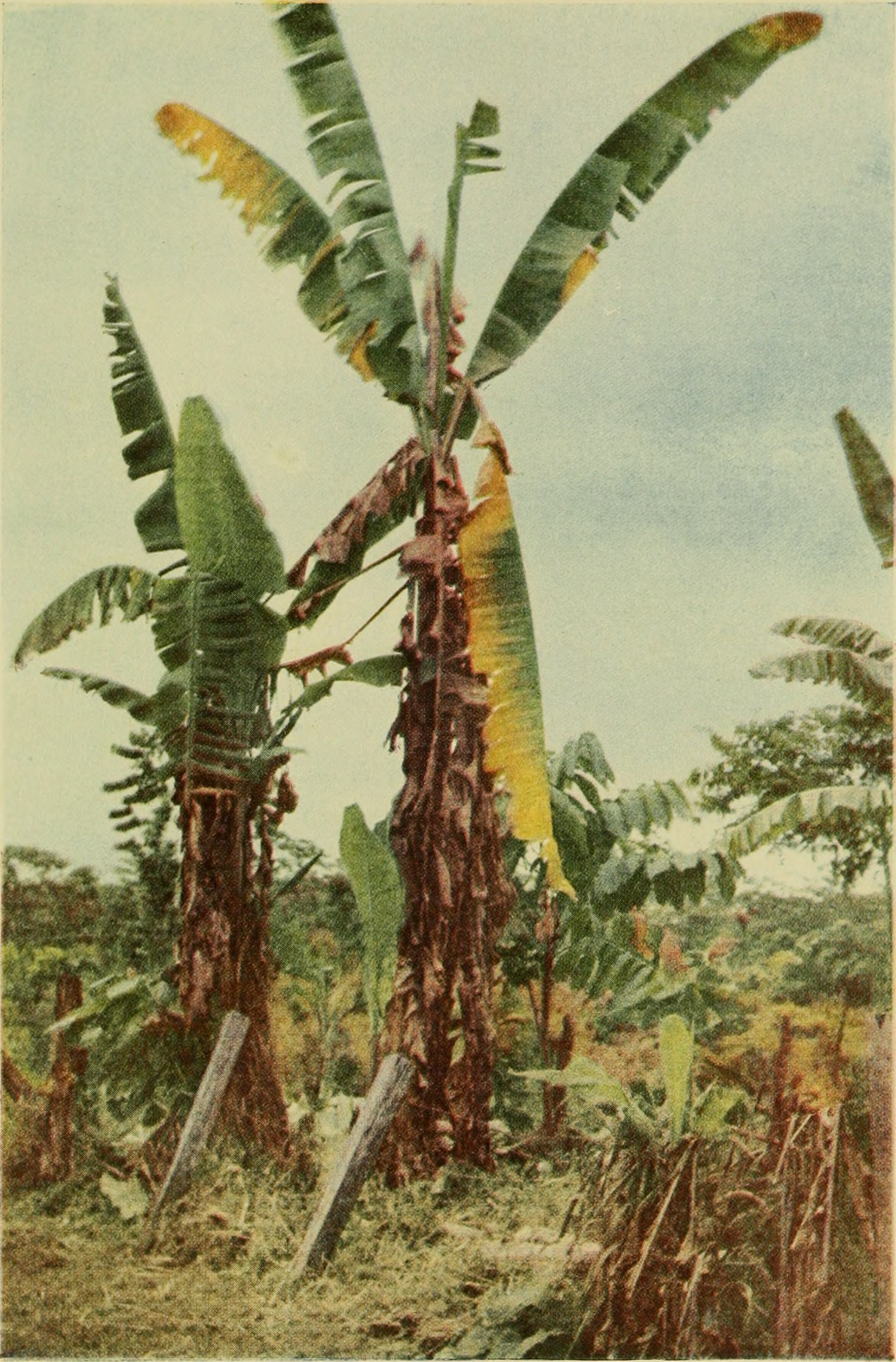
Banana plants of the Gros Michel variety in Costa Rica attacked by the wilt organism (1919)

French naturalist Nicolas Baudin carried a few corms of this banana from Southeast Asia, depositing them at a botanical garden on the Caribbean island of Martinique. In 1835, French botanist Jean François Pouyat carried Baudin's fruit from Martinique to Jamaica. Originally called the "Figue Baudin" ("Baudin's fig"), the fruits were later referred to as "Poyo", after their Jamaican importer; the origin of the name "Gros Michel" is unknown.

Gros Michel bananas were grown on massive plantations in Honduras, Costa Rica, and elsewhere in Central America. The variety was once the dominant export banana to Europe and North America, grown in Central America but, in the 1950s, Panama disease, a wilt caused by the fungus Fusarium oxysporum f.sp. cubense, wiped out vast tracts of Gros Michel plantations in Central America, though it is still grown on non-infected land throughout the region.

By the 1960s, the exporters of Gros Michel bananas were unable to keep trading such a susceptible cultivar, and they started growing resistant cultivars belonging to the Cavendish subgroup (another Musa acuminata AAA).

A 2013 paper described experiments to create a version of Gros Michel which is resistant to black sigatoka, another fungal infection.

== Cultural references ==
"Yes! We Have No Bananas", a novelty song about a grocer from the 1922 Broadway revue Make It Snappy, is said to have been inspired by a shortage of Gros Michel bananas, which began with the infestation of Panama disease early in the 20th century.

The Gros Michel has a higher concentration of isoamyl acetate, the ester commonly used for "banana" food flavoring, than the Cavendish, with some describing its taste as an amplified and artificial-seeming version of the Cavendish. A food history myth is that artificial banana flavor was specifically developed from the Gros Michel, but isoamyl acetate is a simple compound and was not based on any specific cultivar.

== See also ==
- Banana breeding impeded by triploidy
- Banana cultivar groups
- Cooking plantain
- Grand Nain (Chiquita banana)
