= Masak Hijau banana =

Banana cultivar

Musa acuminata 'Masak Hijau'
- Species: Musa acuminata
- Cultivar group: Cavendish subgroup of the AAA Group
- Cultivar: 'Masak Hijau'
- Origin: Malaysia, Philippines, Thailand, Indonesia, Vietnam

Masak Hijau bananas are triploid banana cultivars from Malaysia. It is a member of the commercially important Cavendish banana subgroup. It is a popular banana cultivar in Southeast Asia and the West Indies.

It is also known widely (and erroneously) as Lacatan in Latin America and the West Indies, but should not be confused with the Philippine cultivar Lakatan. Other common names include Monte Cristo, Giant Fig, Bungulan, and Mestiça, among others.

== Description ==
The Masak Hijau banana is one of the tallest Cavendish clones, with the pseudostem reaching heights of 12 to 15 ft (3.7 to 4.6 m) tall. It produces bunches consisting of 6 to 12 hands, each with 12 to 20 fingers. The fruits range from 2 to 2.5 cm (0.79 to 0.98 in) in diameter, and 15 to 25 cm (5.9 to 9.8 in) in length. The fruits ripen when the skin is light green to yellow-green, like other Cavendish cultivars.

== Taxonomy ==
The Masak Hijau banana is a triploid (AAA) cultivar of the Cavendish banana subgroup. Its official designation is Musa acuminata (AAA Group) 'Masak Hijau'.

Masak Hijau is also erroneously called "Lacatan" in Latin America and the West Indies. To avoid confusion with the true Lakatan bananas from the Philippines, the latter is usually spelled with a 'k' in botanical literature, while Masak Hijau is usually spelled with a 'c' (Lacatan) or simply called "Jamaican Lacatan".

Other common names for the cultivar in Southeast Asia include "Pisang Buai" and "Pisang Embun Lumut" in Malaysia; "Pisang Ambon Lumut" in Indonesia; "Bungulan" or "Bongolan" in the Philippines; "Kluai Hom Kiau" in Thailand; "Thihmwe in Myanmar; and "Chuoi Tieu Cao #1" in Vietnam. In the Americas it is also known as "Monte Cristo" in Puerto Rico; "Giant Fig", "Bout Rond", and "Congo" in the West Indies; and "Mestiça" in Brazil. In Oceania it is known as "Hamakua" in Hawaii; "Amoa Kauare" in the Cook Islands; and "Viemama" in Fiji.

== See also ==
- Banana
- Banana Cultivar Groups
- Musa
- Musa acuminata
- Musa balbisiana
