= Grand Nain =

Edible fruit cultivar

Musa acuminata 'Grand Nain'
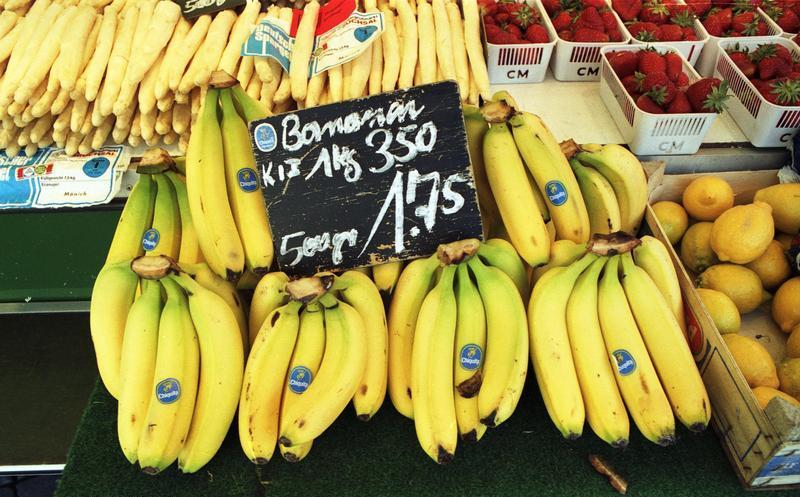
- The majority of the Cavendish bananas sold in the world market belong to the Grand Nain cultivar.
- Species: Musa acuminata
- Cultivar group: Cavendish subgroup of the AAA Group
- Cultivar: 'Grand Nain'

The Grand Nain banana (also spelled Grande Naine) is a banana cultivar of Musa acuminata. It is one of the most commonly cultivated bananas and a member of the commercial Cavendish banana cultivar group. It is also known as the Chiquita banana because it is the main product of Chiquita Brands International.

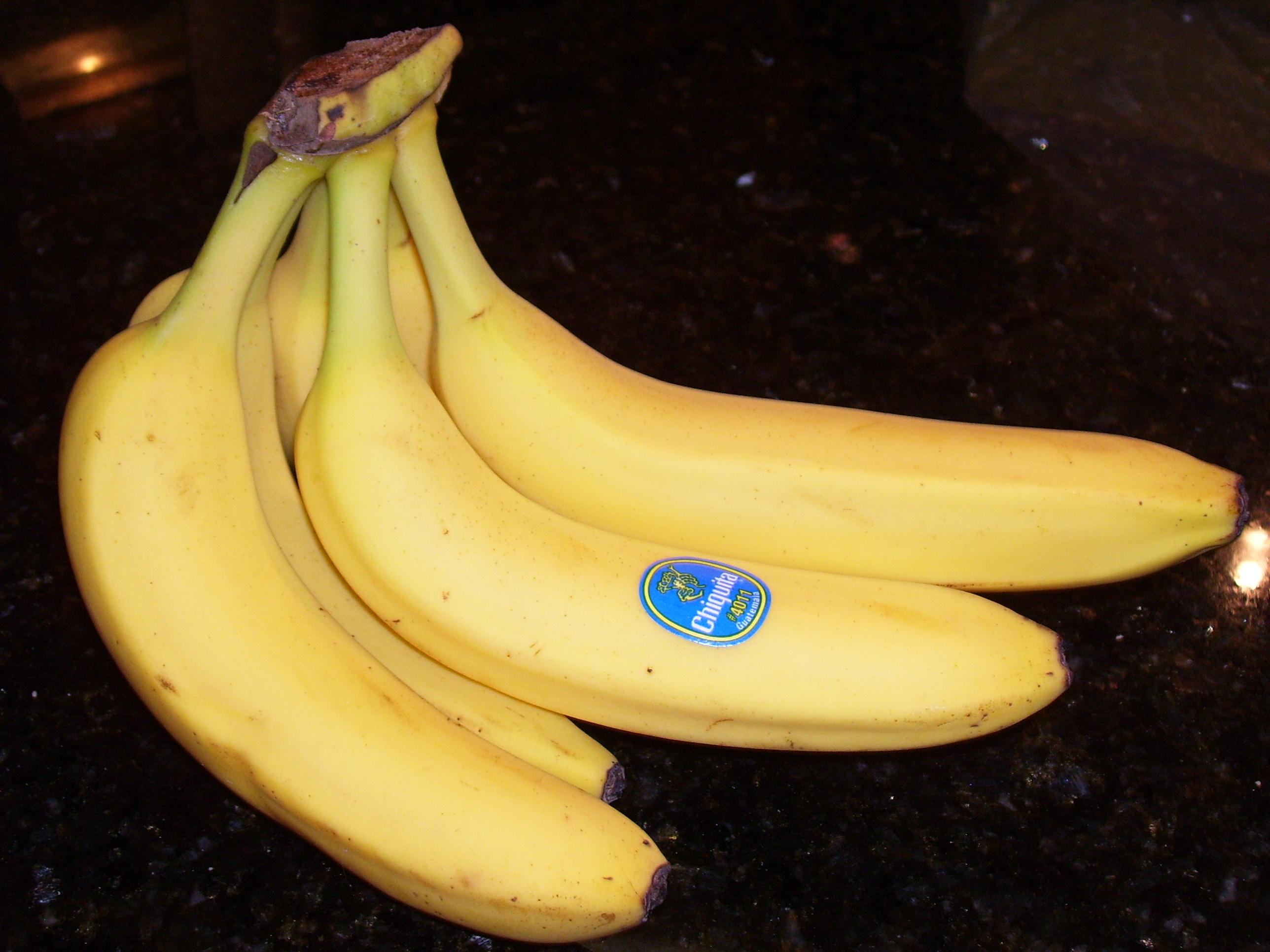
The Cavendish bananas sold by Chiquita Brand are of the Grand Nain cultivar.

== Taxonomy ==
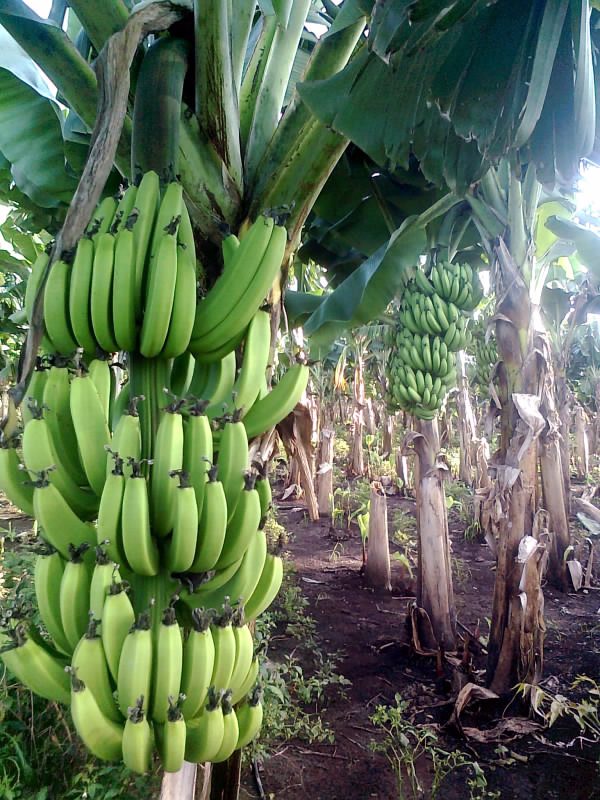
Grand Nain variety of banana in a farm at Chinawal village in India

Taxonomically speaking, the Grand Nain is a monocot and belongs to the genus Musa. Species designations are difficult when considering bananas because nearly all banana cultivars are descendants or hybrids of the Musa acuminata or Musa balbisiana, wild species that have been propagated for agricultural use.

The Grand Nain is a cultivar of the Cavendish bananas. This group of bananas is distinguished from other groups by their AAA genotype. The AAA genotype refers to the fact that this group is a triploid variant of the species M. acuminata. There are 33 chromosomes present in the AAA cultivar and all produce seedless fruits through parthenocarpy. This fact means that the plants are spread by conventional vegetative methods and lack sexual reproduction. This lack of genetic diversity makes Grand Nains as well as other AAA cultivars vulnerable to diseases and pests.

The accepted name of Grand Nain is Musa acuminata (AAA Group) 'Grand Nain'.

'Grand Nain' or 'Grand Naine' literally translates from French as "Large Dwarf".

== Appearance ==
The name Grand Nain refers to its relative height compared to other Cavendish cultivars. It is shorter than the Giant Cavendish and taller than the Dwarf Cavendish cultivars. The Grand Nain cannot typically be distinguished from other Cavendish cultivars without growing the plants side by side and comparing the heights. The plant, like other banana plants, is an herbaceous "tree" that produces large oblong leaves. The leaves often become torn or tattered at the ends as a result of mechanical stresses such as wind. Being an angiosperm, the Grand Nain produces large inflorescences that develop into the edible fruit.

== Economic relevance ==
Bananas are ranked as the fourth-most cultivated crop in the world and constitute a significant portion of many populations' caloric intake. In addition, they are rich in potassium, vitamin B6, vitamin C, dietary fiber, and manganese. While this includes all cultivars, the Grand Nain has become one of the most popular varieties for commercial plantations. Its characteristic medium height and large fruit yields make it ideal for commercial agriculture. The moderate height allows easy harvesting and some resistance to windthrow (plants breaking due to strong winds). Plantations growing Grand Naines range from the tropical regions of Central America, Africa, India, and Southeast Asia. In many tropical communities, entire local economies are based upon banana production and exportation.

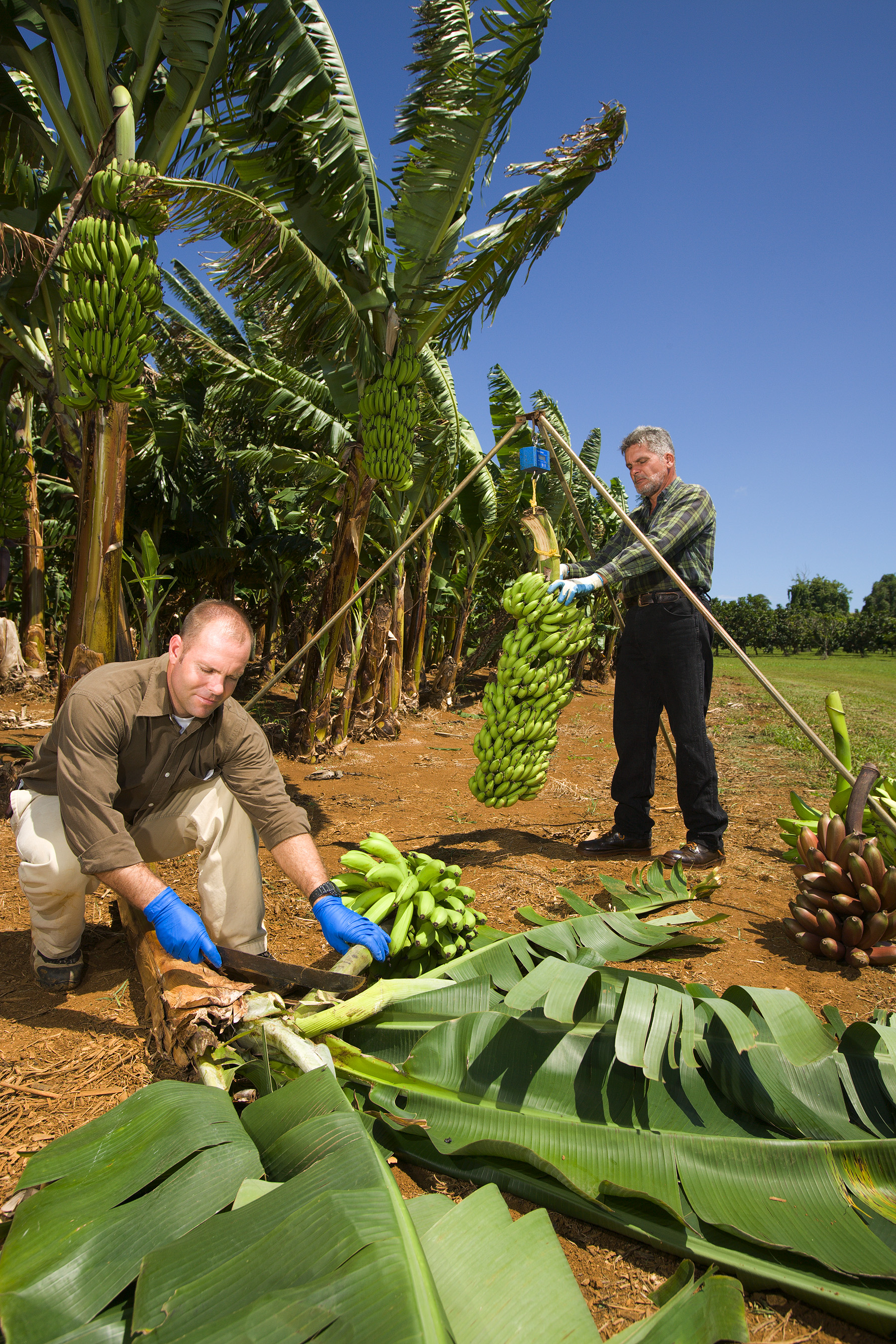
Grand Nain Cavendish bananas being weighed for research

Because of its importance both as a staple crop and as a cash crop, much botanical research has focused on the Grand Nain. Furthermore, its lack of genetic diversity eliminates unwanted experimental variables, increasing the validity of observed results. Of particular interest is the banana plant's sensitivity to aluminum, which slows growth and causes leaf abnormalities. Researchers found that introducing different species of mycorrhizal fungi can increase aluminum toxicity resistance.

== Ecological impact ==
Because bananas are such a large and important crop in many tropical regions, their cultivation has several ecological ramifications, the most obvious of which is the clearing of rainforest. In the past, these ecological impacts as well as accusations of employee abuse plagued large corporations like Chiquita, Del Monte, and Dole (which control a combined two-thirds of the banana market). Within the past 10 years, though, companies like Chiquita have taken steps to improve public relations by introducing more sustainable agricultural techniques. These include the utilization of kidney weed, which discourages weed growth without adversely affecting banana plants. Chiquita has also established a 284-acre (1.15 km^{2}) reserve in Costa Rica and now recycles many waste materials associated with the industry. These efforts have reduced but not eliminated ecological concerns associated with banana plantations.

Issues discussed apply to all banana cultivars commercially farmed, of which the Grand Nain constitutes the majority.

== See also ==
- Banana
- Banana cultivar groups
- Cavendish banana subgroup
- Cooking plantain
- Musa
- Musa acuminata
