= Dwarf Cavendish banana =

Banana cultivar

Musa acuminata 'Dwarf Cavendish'
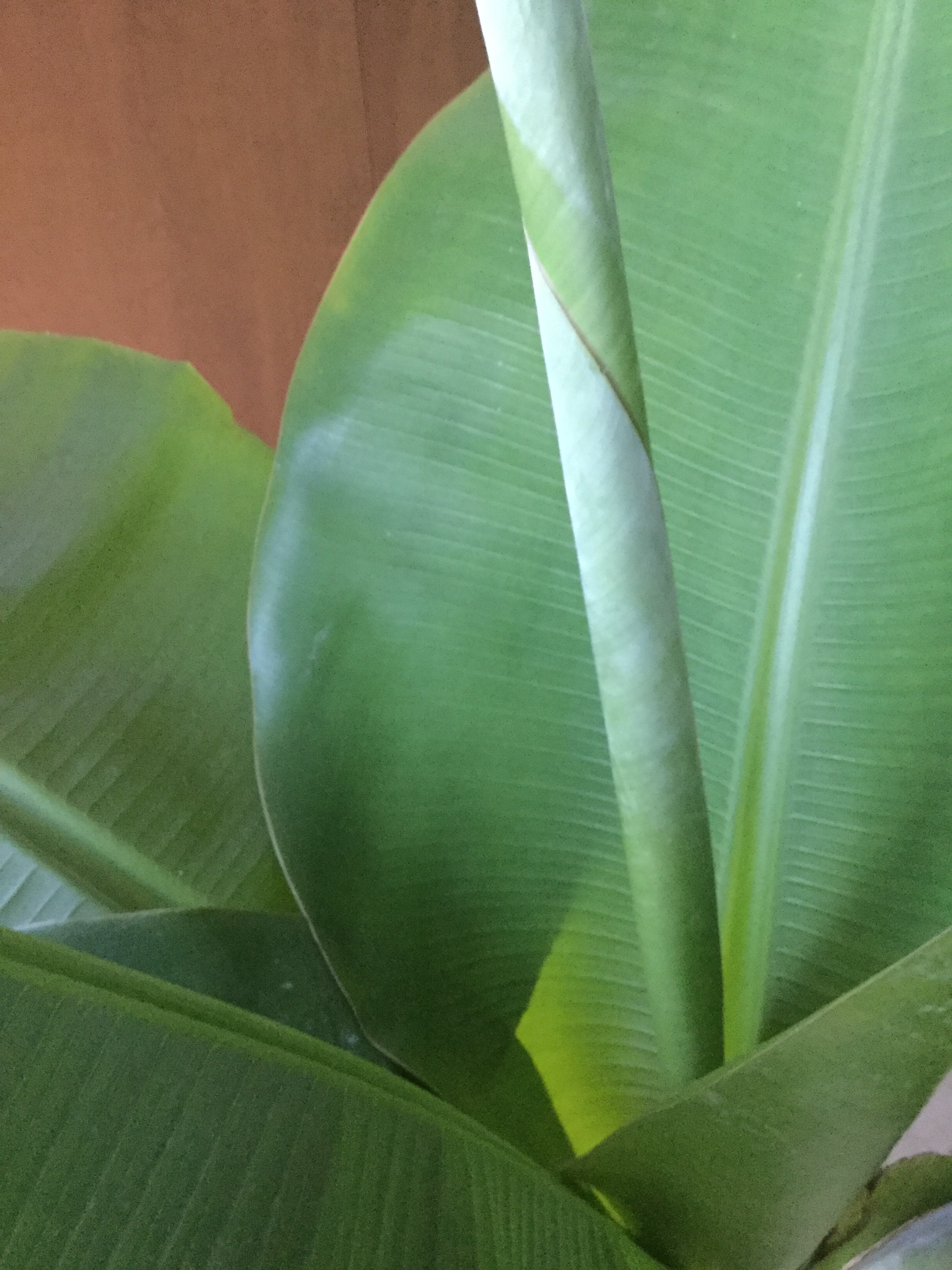
- A two year old Dwarf Cavendish banana tree
- Species: Musa acuminata
- Cultivar group: Cavendish subgroup of the AAA Group
- Cultivar: 'Dwarf Cavendish'
- Origin: Canary Islands

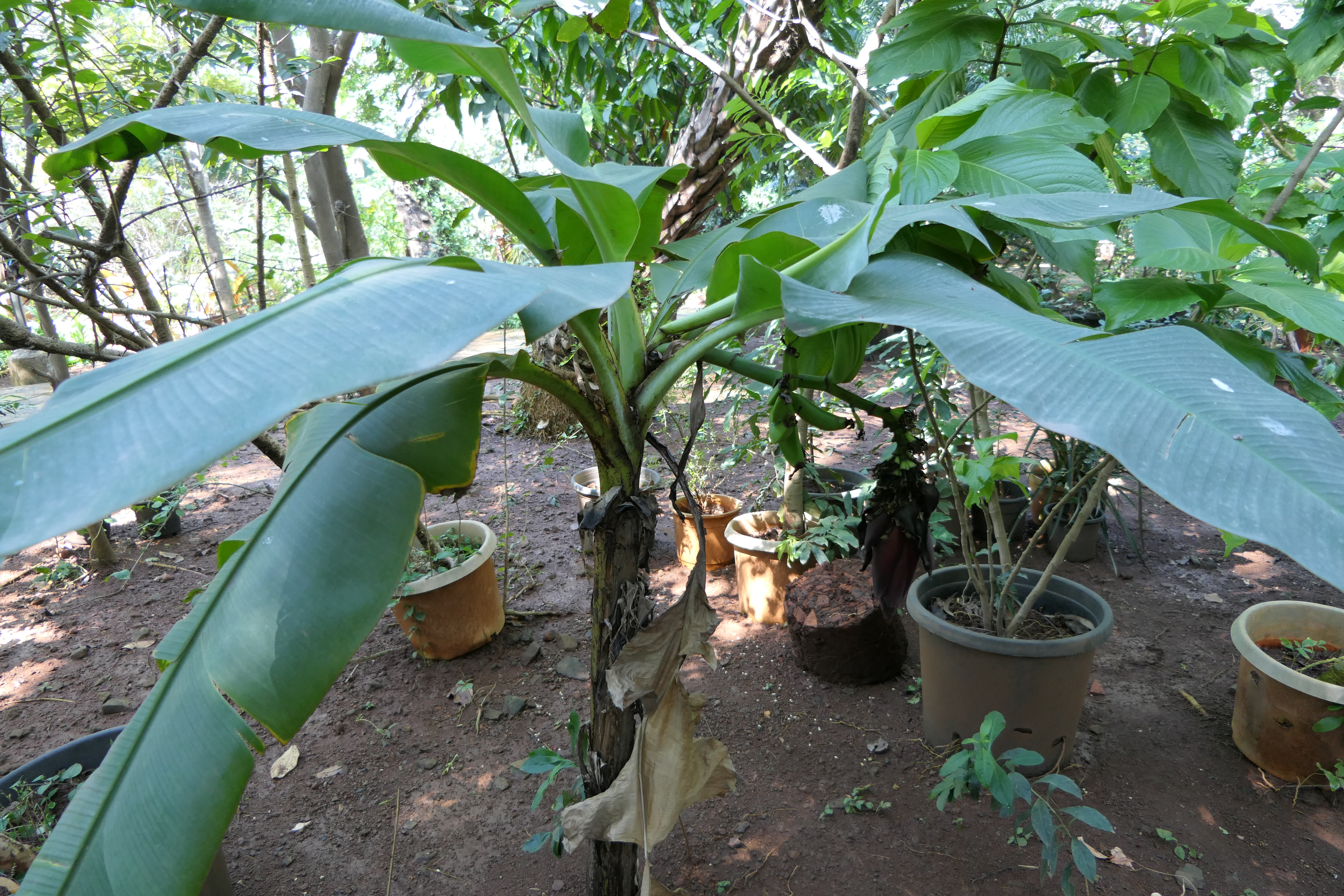
Dwarf Cavendish

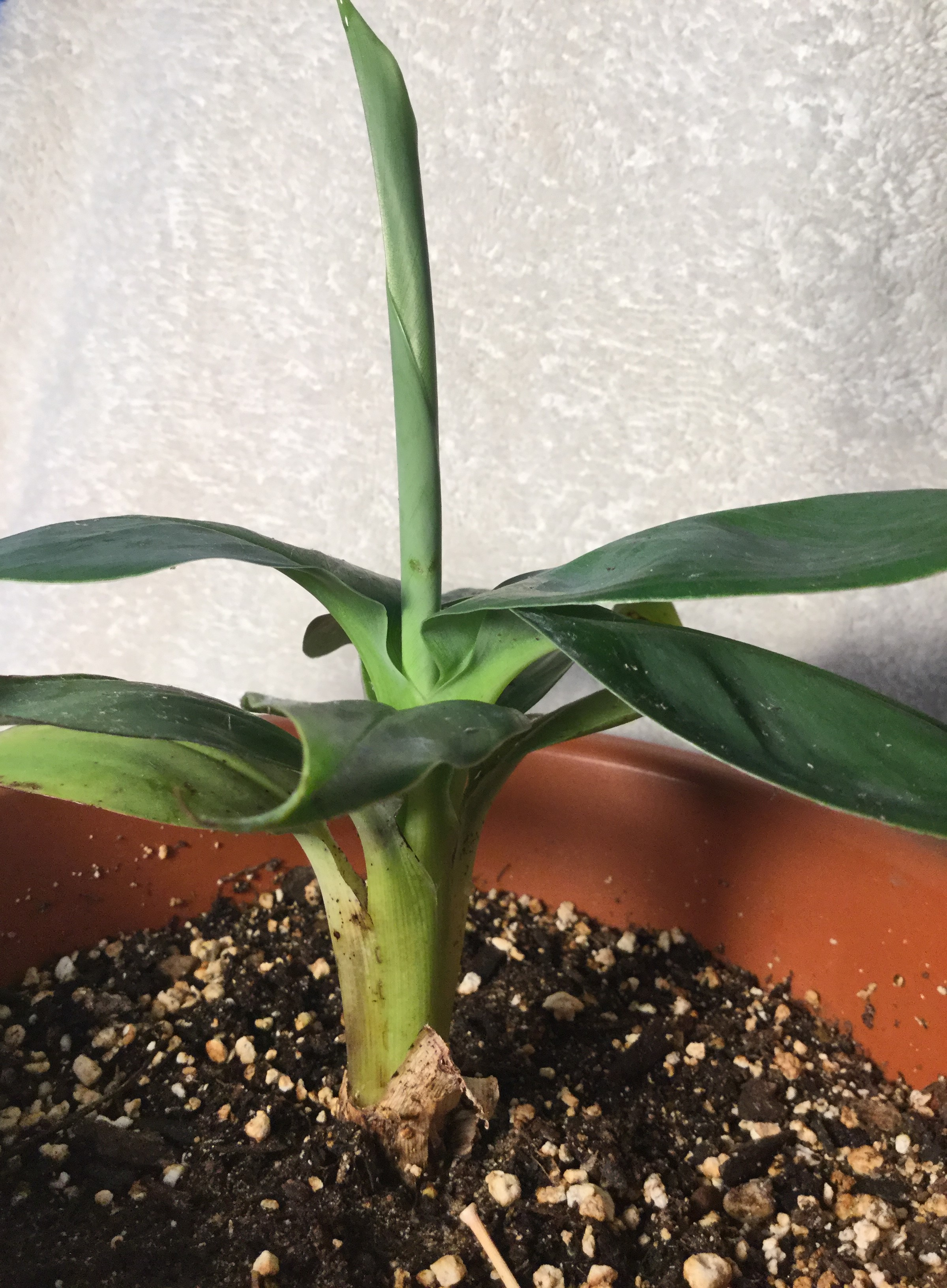
A Dwarf Cavendish Pup

The Dwarf Cavendish banana is a widely grown and commercially important Cavendish cultivar. The name "Dwarf Cavendish" is in reference to the height of the pseudostem, not the fruit. Young plants have maroon or purple blotches on their leaves but quickly lose them as they mature. It is one of the most commonly planted banana varieties from the Cavendish group, and the main source of commercial Cavendish bananas along with Grand Nain.

== History of cultivation ==
Cavendish bananas were named after William Cavendish, 6th Duke of Devonshire. Though not the first known banana specimens in Europe, around 1834 Cavendish received a shipment of bananas courtesy of the chaplain of Alton Towers (then the seat of the Earls of Shrewsbury). His gardener, Sir Joseph Paxton cultivated them in the greenhouses of Chatsworth House. The plants were botanically described by Paxton as Musa cavendishii, after the Duke.

The Chatsworth bananas were shipped off to various places in the Pacific around the 1850s. It is believed that some of them may have ended up in the Canary Islands, though other authors believe that the bananas in the Canary Islands had been there since the fifteenth century and had been introduced through other means, namely by early Portuguese explorers who obtained them from West Africa and were later responsible for spreading them to the Caribbean. African bananas in turn were introduced from Southeast Asia into Madagascar by early Austronesian sailors. In 1888, bananas from the Canary Islands were imported into England by Thomas Fyffe. These bananas are now known to belong to the Dwarf Cavendish cultivar.

== Taxonomy ==
Its accepted name is Musa (AAA group) 'Dwarf Cavendish'. Synonyms include: from the Dwarf Cavendish.

1. Musa acuminata L. A. Colla
2. Musa nana J. de Loureiro (name accepted at Mobot)
3. Musa nana auct. non J. de Loureiro
4. Musa chinensis R. Sweet
5. Musa sinensis P. A. Sagot ex J. G. Baker
6. Musa sinensis P. A. Sagot
7. Musa sinensis R. Sweet ex P. A. Sagot

Other common names include klue hom kom, pisang serendah, Chinese banana, and Canary banana.

== Description ==
Dwarf Cavendish leaves are broad with short petioles. Its shortness makes it stable, wind-resistant, and easier to manage. This, in addition to its fast growth rate, makes it ideal for plantation cultivation. An easily recognizable characteristic of this cultivar is that the male bracts and flowers are not shed.

The fruits of the Dwarf Cavendish cultivar range from about 15 to 25 cm in length, and are thin skinned. Each plant can bear up to 90 fingers.
