= Cavendish banana =

Banana cultivar

Cavendish
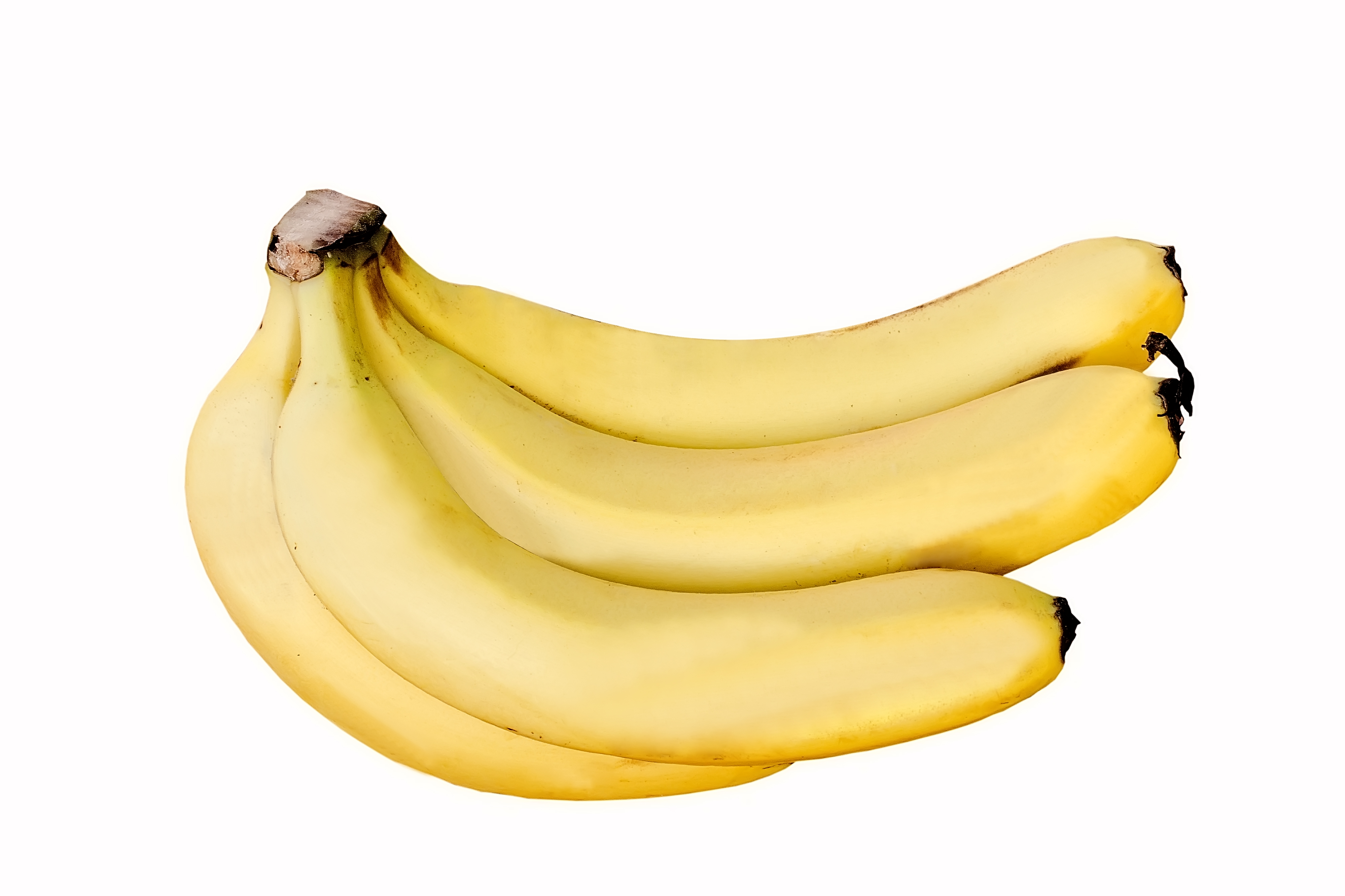
- A bunch of Cavendish bananas
- Species: Musa acuminata
- Cultivar group: Cavendish subgroup of the AAA Group
- Cultivar group members: See text

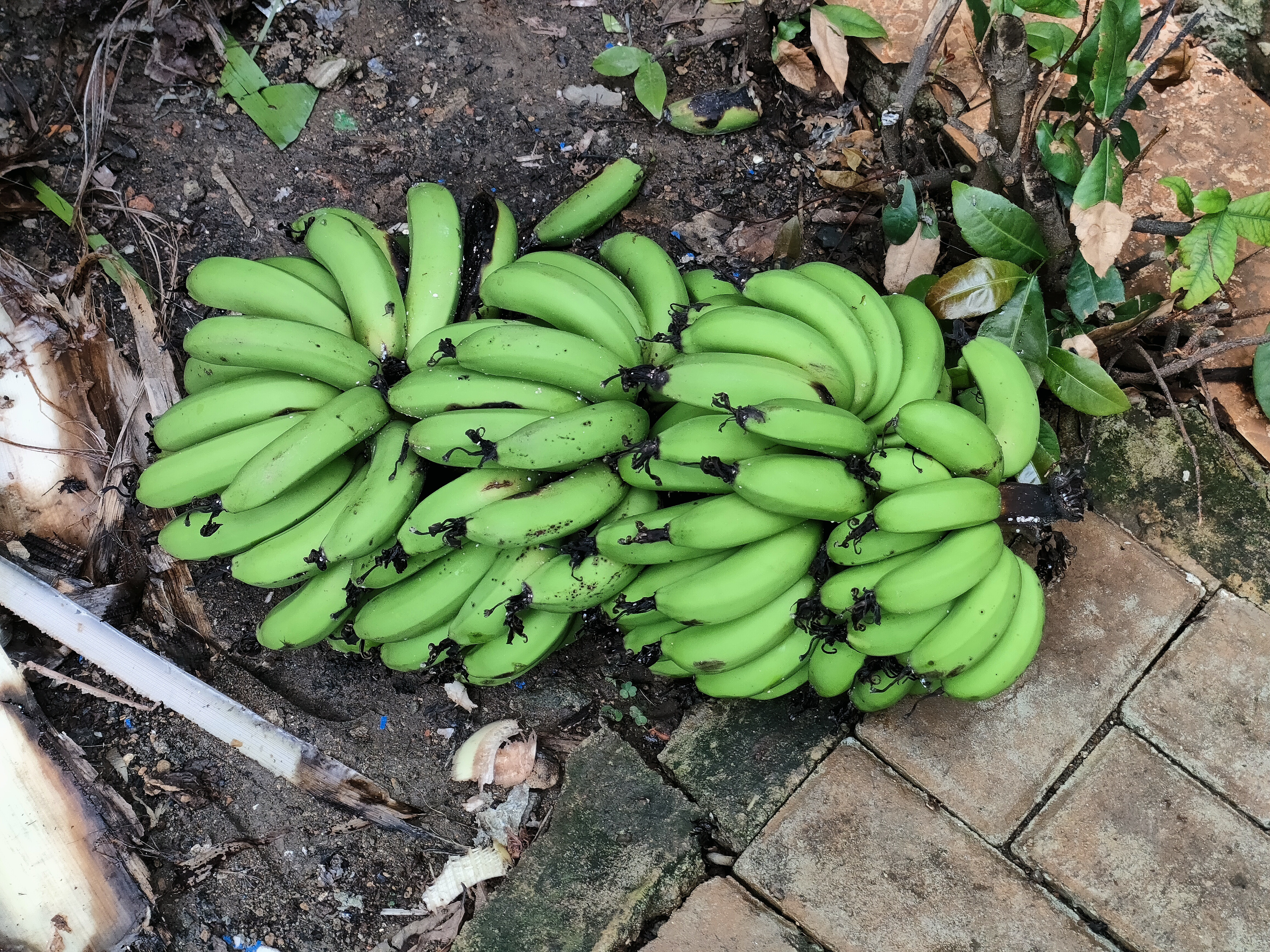
Unripe cavendish bananas

Cavendish bananas are the fruits of one of a number of banana cultivars belonging to the Cavendish subgroup of the AAA banana cultivar group (triploid cultivars of Musa acuminata). The same term is also used to describe the plants on which the bananas grow.

They include commercially important cultivars like 'Dwarf Cavendish' (1888) and 'Grand Nain' (the "Chiquita banana"). Since the 1950s, these cultivars have been the most internationally traded bananas. They replaced the Gros Michel banana after it was devastated by Panama disease.

They are unable to reproduce sexually, instead being propagated via identical clones. Due to this, the genetic diversity of the Cavendish banana is very low. This, combined with the fact the Cavendish is planted in dense chunks in a monoculture without other natural species to serve as a buffer, makes the Cavendish extremely vulnerable to disease, fungal outbreaks, and genetic mutation, possibly leading to eventual commercial extinction.

== History of cultivation ==
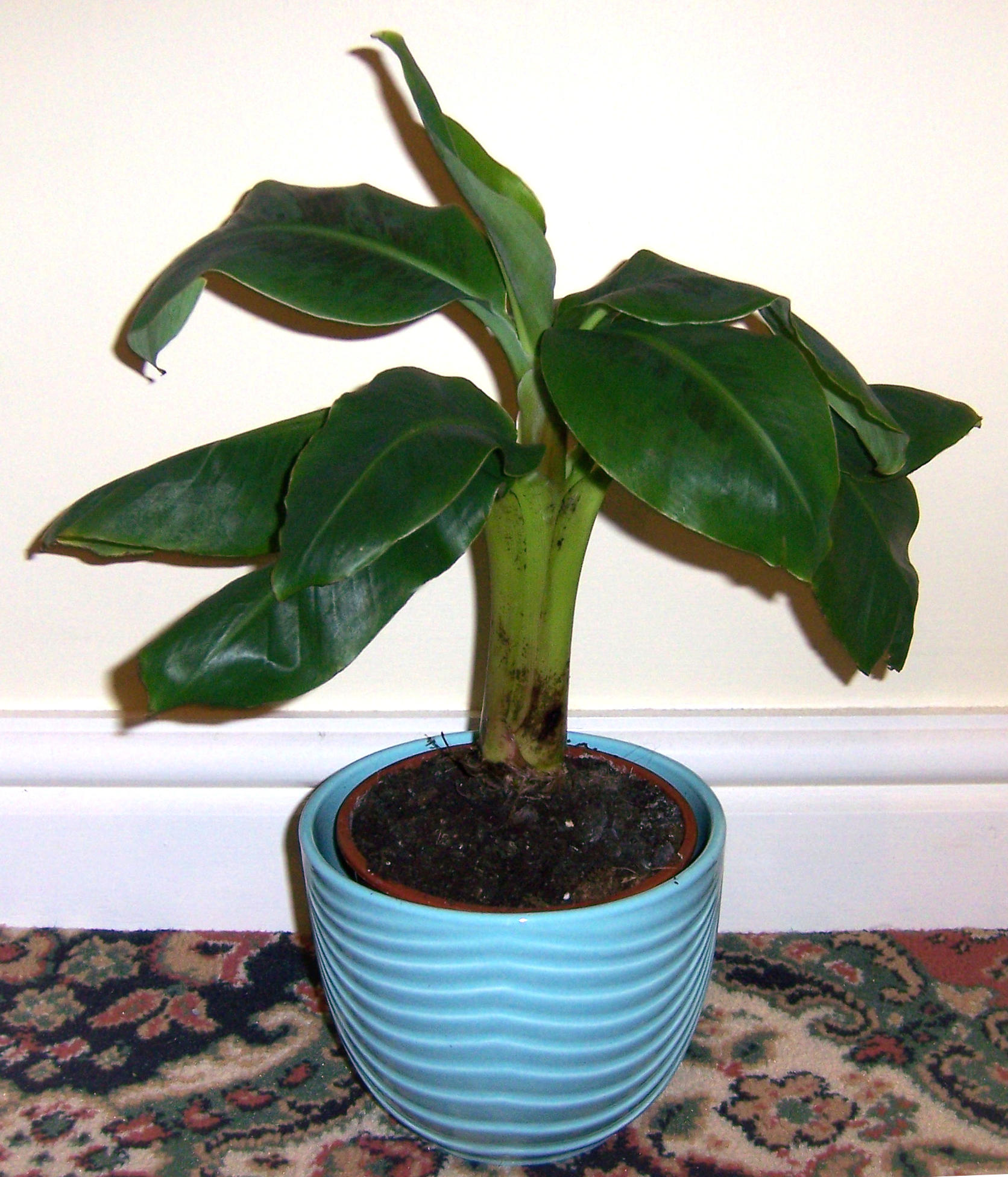
The 'Super Dwarf Cavendish' cultivar

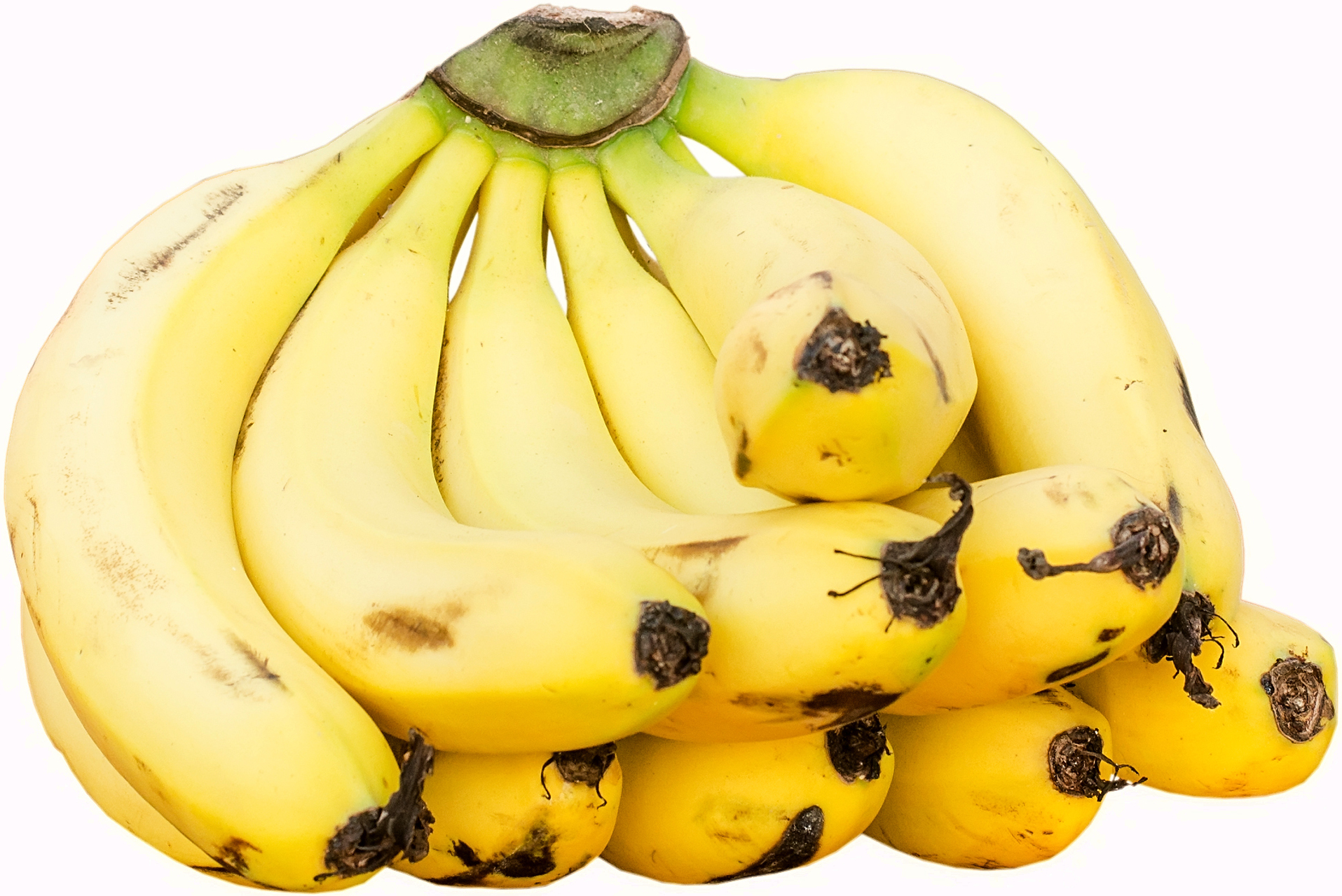
Cavendish bananas

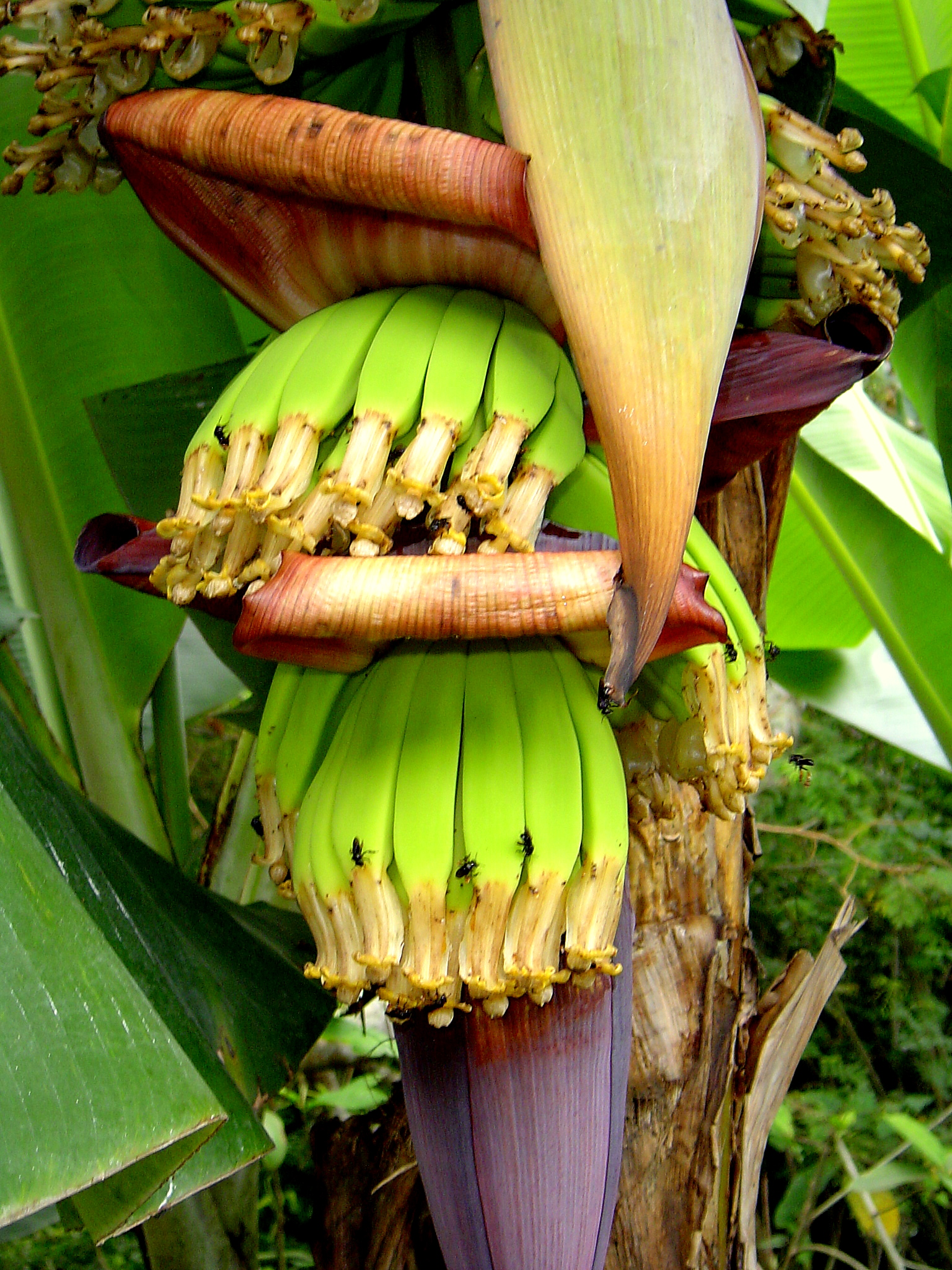
Developing fruits of a Cavendish banana

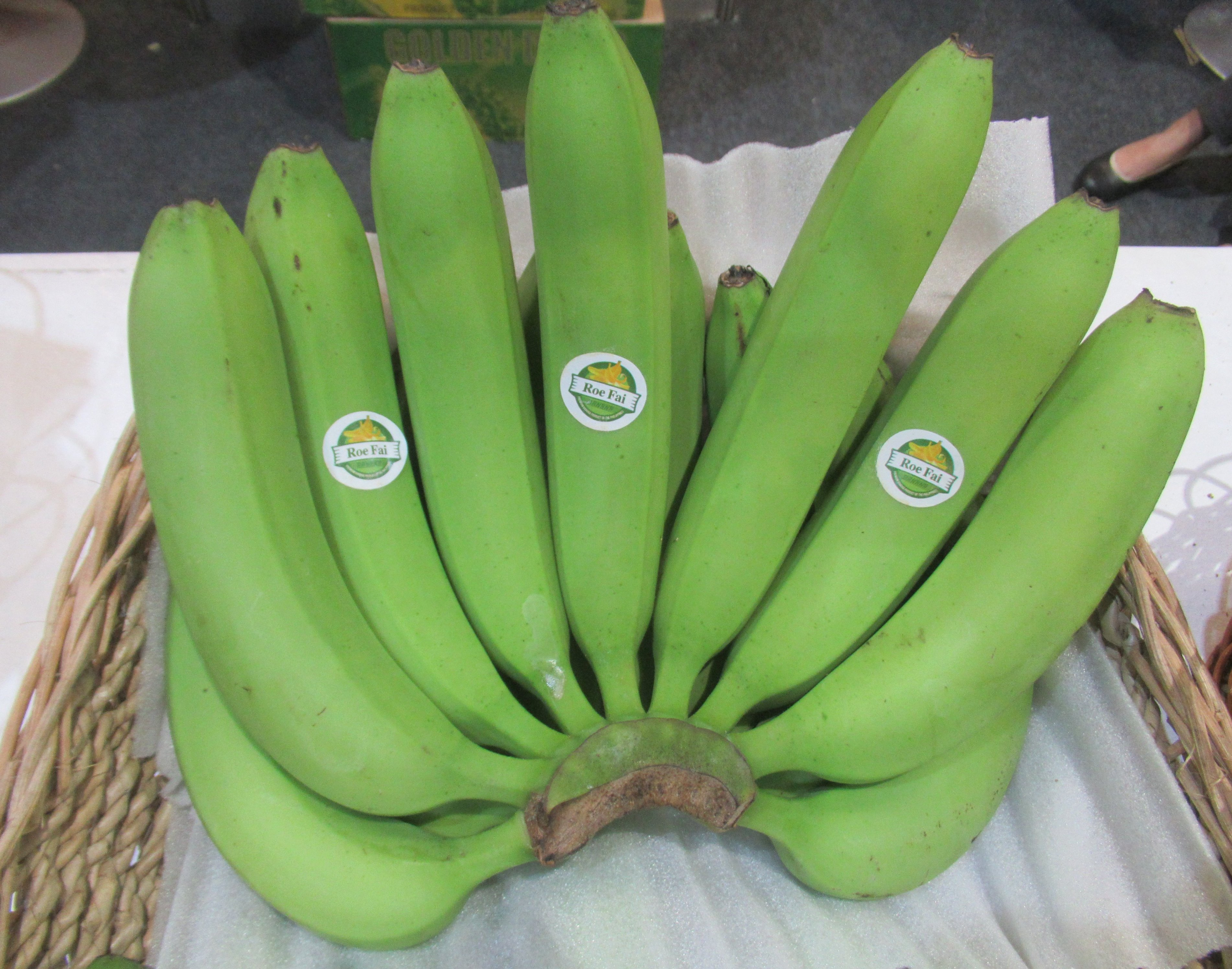
Unripe Philippine Cavendish

Cavendish bananas were named after William Cavendish, 6th Duke of Devonshire. Though they were not the first known banana specimens in Europe, in around 1834 Cavendish received a shipment of bananas (from Mauritius) courtesy of the chaplain of Alton Towers (then the seat of the Earls of Shrewsbury). His head gardener and friend, Sir Joseph Paxton, cultivated them in the greenhouses of Chatsworth House. The plants were botanically described by Paxton as Musa cavendishii, after the Duke. For his work, Paxton won a medal at the 1835 Royal Horticultural Society show.

The Chatsworth bananas were shipped off to various places in the Pacific around the 1850s. It is believed that some of them may have ended up in the Canary Islands, though other authors believe that the bananas in the Canary Islands had been there since the fifteenth century and had been introduced by early Portuguese explorers who obtained them from West Africa and were later responsible for spreading them to the Caribbean. African bananas in turn were introduced from Southeast Asia into Madagascar by early Austronesian sailors. In 1888, bananas from the Canary Islands were imported into England by Thomas Fyffe. These bananas are now known to belong to the Dwarf Cavendish cultivar.

Cavendish bananas entered mass commercial production in 1903 but did not gain prominence until later when Panama disease attacked the dominant Gros Michel ("Big Mike") variety in the 1950s. Because they were successfully grown in the same soils as previously affected Gros Michel plants, many assumed the Cavendish cultivars were more resistant to Panama disease. Contrary to this notion, in mid-2008, reports from Sumatra and Malaysia suggested that Panama disease had started attacking Cavendish cultivars.

After years of attempting to keep it out of the Americas, in mid-2019, Panama disease Tropical Race 4 (TR4), was discovered on banana farms in the coastal Caribbean region. With no fungicide effective against TR4, the Cavendish may meet the same fate as the Gros Michel.

== Taxonomy and nomenclature ==
Cavendish bananas are a subgroup of the triploid (AAA) group cultivars of Musa acuminata.

Cavendish cultivars are distinguished by the height of the plant and features of the fruits, and different cultivars may be recognized as distinct by different authorities. The most important clones for fruit production include: 'Dwarf Cavendish', 'Grande Nain', 'Lacatan' (bungulan), 'Poyo', 'Valéry', and 'Williams' under one system of cultivar classification. Another classification includes: 'Double', 'Dwarf Cavendish', 'Extra Dwarf Cavendish', 'Grande Naine', 'Pisang Masak Hijau' (syn 'Lacatan'), and 'Giant Cavendish' as a group of several difficult to distinguish cultivars (including 'Poyo', 'Robusta', 'Valéry', & 'Williams'). 'Grande Naine' is the most important clone in international trade, while 'Dwarf Cavendish' is the most widely grown clone. 'Grande Naine' is also known as Chiquita banana.

== Uses ==
Cavendish bananas accounted for 47% of global banana production between 1998 and 2000, and the vast majority of bananas entering international trade.

The fruits of the Cavendish bananas are eaten raw, used in baking, fruit salads, and to complement foods. The outer skin is partially green when bananas are sold in food markets, and turns yellow when the fruit ripens. As it ripens, the starch is converted to sugars turning the fruit sweet. When it reaches its final stage (stage 7), brown/black "sugar spots" develop. When overripe, the skin turns black and the flesh becomes mushy.

Bananas ripen naturally or through an induced process. Once picked, they can turn yellow on their own provided that they are fully mature by the time they are being harvested, or can be exposed to ethylene gas to induce ripening. Bananas which are turning yellow emit natural ethylene which is characterized by the emission of sweet scented esters. Most retailers sell bananas in stages 3–6, with stage 5–7 being the most ideal for immediate consumption. The PLUs used for Cavendish bananas are 4011 (yellow) and 4186 (small yellow). Organic Cavendish bananas are assigned PLU 94011.

== Diseases ==
Cavendish bananas, accounting for around 99% of banana exports to developed countries, are vulnerable to the fungal disease known as Panama disease. There is a risk of extinction of the variety. Because Cavendish bananas are parthenocarpic (having no seeds and reproducing only through cloning), their resistance to disease is often low. Development of disease resistance depends on mutations occurring in the propagation units, and hence evolves more slowly than in seed-propagated crops.

The development of resistant varieties has therefore been the only alternative to protect the fruit trees from tropical and subtropical diseases like bacterial wilt and Fusarium wilt, commonly known as Panama disease. A replacement for the Cavendish would likely depend on genetic engineering, which is banned in some countries. Conventional plant breeding has not yet been able to produce a variety that preserves the flavor and shelf-life of the Cavendish. In 2017, James Dale, a biotechnologist at Queensland University of Technology in Brisbane, Australia, produced just such a transgenic banana resistant to Tropical Race 4.

In 2023, the Philippine Space Agency and Bureau of Plant Industry utilized pest control against Fusarium oxysporum f.sp. cubense. In 2022, Philippines was second top banana exporter with Cavendish banana as the top variety.

== See also ==
- List of banana cultivars
- Banana industry
- Musa (the genus)
