= Windowpane =

Windowpane or paned window may refer to:

- Paned window (architecture), an architectural element
- Paned window (computing), a graphical user interface divided into discrete areas
- Windowpane (song), a 1991 song by Coil from Love's Secret Domain
- "Windowpane", a 2003 song by Opeth from Damnation
- Windowpane, the structure of [4.4.4.4]fenestrane
- Windowpane, a piece of gelatin containing LSD

== See also ==
- Windowpane coconut or Beccariophoenix madagascariensis, a flowering plant in the family Arecaceae
- Windowpane flounder (Scophthalmus aquosus), a fish from the family Scophthalmidae
- Windowpane oyster, a bivalve marine mollusk in the family Placunidae
- Windowpane plaid, a way of crossing warp and weft to create a pattern
