= Beccariophoenix fenestralis =

Conservation status
- Critically Endangered (IUCN 3.1)

Scientific classification
- Kingdom: Plantae
- Clade: Embryophytes
- Clade: Tracheophytes
- Clade: Spermatophytes
- Clade: Angiosperms
- Clade: Monocots
- Clade: Commelinids
- Order: Arecales
- Family: Arecaceae
- Genus: Beccariophoenix
- Species: B. fenestralis

Binomial name
- Beccariophoenix fenestralis J.Dransfield & M.Rakotoarinivo

Species of palm

Beccariophoenix fenestralis is a species of plant in the family Arecaceae. It was described as a species distinct from Beccariophoenix madagascariensis in 2014.

== Description ==
Beccariophoenix fenestralis is a palm tree which grows about 10 meters tall.

It differs from B. madagascariensis when a seedling, in having wide, mostly unsplit leaves, whereas the B. madagascariensis has fully split, very stiff upright leaves when young.

== Range and habitat ==
Beccariophoenix fenestralis is known from a single location in Brickaville, Atsinanana region, growing in humid lowland forest at 140 meters elevation.

== Conservation and threats ==
There is only one known population of the species, with an area of occupancy (AOO) of 4 km^{2}. It is threatened by harvesting of mature plants and habitat loss from shifting cultivation. Its habitat is not protected. Its conservation status is assessed as Critically Endangered.
