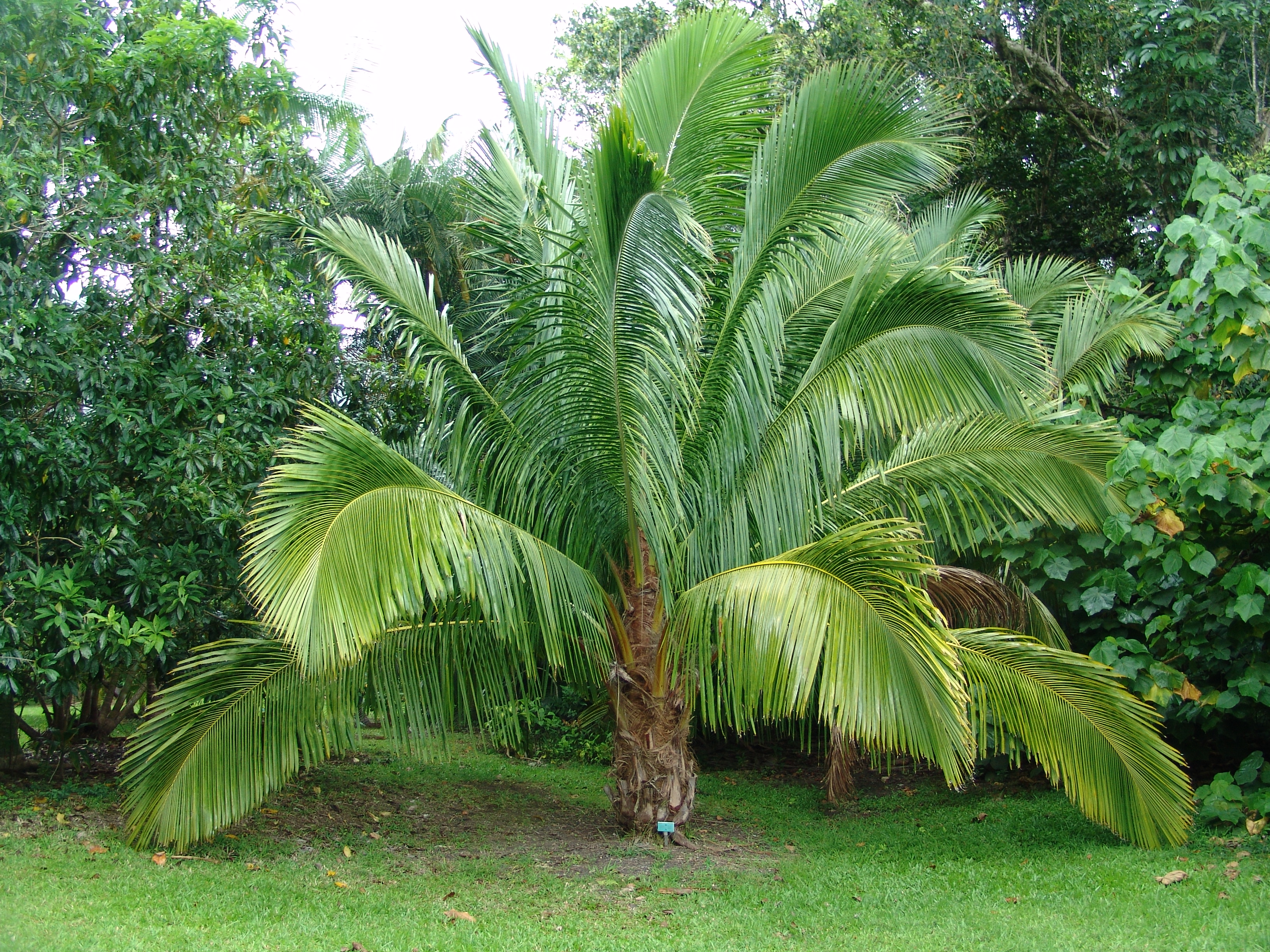
- A young Beccariophoenix palm.

Scientific classification
- Kingdom: Plantae
- Clade: Tracheophytes
- Clade: Angiosperms
- Clade: Monocots
- Clade: Commelinids
- Order: Arecales
- Family: Arecaceae
- Subfamily: Arecoideae
- Tribe: Cocoseae
- Subtribe: Attaleinae
- Genus: Beccariophoenix; Jum. & H.Perrier

Type species
- Beccariophoenix madagascariensis

= Beccariophoenix =

Genus of palms

Beccariophoenix is a genus of three species of Arecaceae (palms), native to Madagascar. The genus is closely related to the Cocos, or coconut genus, and notably Beccariophoenix alfredii is similar in appearance to the coconut palm. It was named after Odoardo Beccari (1843-1920).

== Description ==
Palms in this group have solitary trunks. Crownshafts are not present in the genus; the leaves are pinnate, to 2–5 m long. The term "windowpane" palm comes from the leaflets on younger plants that are only partially divided from each other, where there appear to be 'windows' in the leaves between the leaflets. Older specimens do not display the windowpanes as the leaflets completely divide from each other.

They are somewhat cold hardy, down to about −3 °C, making them a good look-alike for the coconut in cooler climates.

== Species ==
Image	Name	Common name	Distribution
	Beccariophoenix alfredii Rakotoarin., Ranariv. & J.Dransf.	high plateau coconut palm	Madagascar
	Beccariophoenix madagascariensis Jum. & H.Perrier	coastal beccariophoenix	Madagascar.
	Beccariophoenix fenestralis J. Dransfield & M. Rakotoarinivo	"giant windowpane palm"	Madagascar.

The 'windows' palm was originally classified as a variant of B. madagascariensis, but was given its own name in June 2014.
