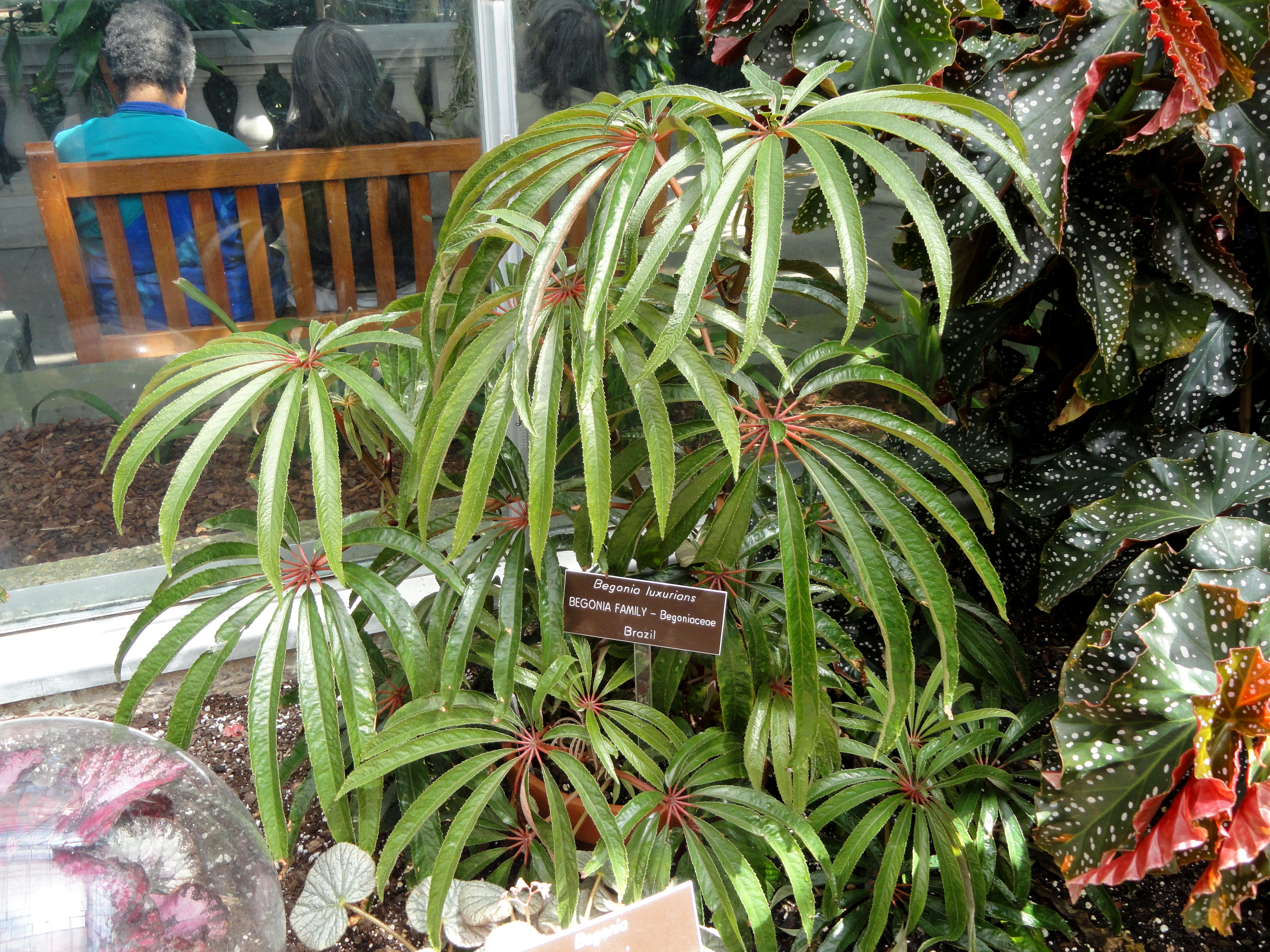

Scientific classification
- Kingdom: Plantae
- Clade: Embryophytes
- Clade: Tracheophytes
- Clade: Spermatophytes
- Clade: Angiosperms
- Clade: Eudicots
- Clade: Rosids
- Order: Cucurbitales
- Family: Begoniaceae
- Genus: Begonia
- Species: B. verticillata

Binomial name
- Begonia verticillata Vell.

Synonyms
- List: Scheidweileria luxurians (Scheidw.) Klotzsch; Begonia luxurians var. sampaioana Brade; Scheidweileria luxurians (Scheidw.) Klotzsch

= Begonia verticillata =

Species of flowering plant

Begonia verticillata (formerly Begonia luxurians) also known as the tree begonia or palm leaf begonia, is a species of flowering plant in the family Begoniaceae endemic to the tropical rainforests in Southeast Brazil. It's an evergreen perennial flowering plant known for its height, its large, drooping, palmate leaves, and its bright-red, erect stems. It's got fibrous roots, and a shrub-like growth habit. Despite its common names of palm-leaf or tree begonia, B. verticillata is neither a member of the palm family, Aracaceae, nor is it truly a tree.

== Etymology ==
Each of the large palmate leaves are divided into many narrow leaflets, which resemble fronds, and in the right conditions, plants can reach 2.5 m (8.2 ft) in height. The size and leaf shape make Begonia verticillata resemble a palm tree, leading to the common names "tree begonia", and "palm leaf begonia".

The specific epithet comes from the Latin word verticillus, meaning "a whorl". The compound leaflets are peltately compound, not whorled. It's possible the whorl in this context refers to extra, ectopic leaflets that sometimes form at the petiole.

== Cultivation ==
Typically, this species does not tolerate temperatures below 10 °C (50 °F); however, if given adequate protection and in appropriate climates—such as Southern California or Florida—B. verticillata will likely persevere winters down to the upper 40s °F (4–10 °C) and low 50s °F (10–15 °C). In temperate climates, or more northerly or southerly extremes, it needs to be grown indoors or in a greenhouse, in indirect or dappled light, or partially shaded or bright shade conditions. Soils should be acidic to neutral, and should be amended prior to planting, with plenty of added inert materials for drainage, such as perlite or pumice, or even vermiculite, to prevent rot. However, the mixture still needs sufficient organic matter to retain moisture, without being sopping wet, such as coconut husks (coco coir), rice hulls, compost, coffee grounds or earthworm castings. In the summer months, potted plants may be placed outside in a sheltered position, away from high winds and scorching sun. B. verticillata may benefit from a yearly (or twice-yearly) application of a mild, slow-release granulated fertilizer, or a monthly to fortnightly half-strength dose of water-soluble feed. For both methods, 50% of the recommended dosage is safest as to avoid leaf-burn or salt toxicity.

It has gained the Royal Horticultural Society's Award of Garden Merit.
