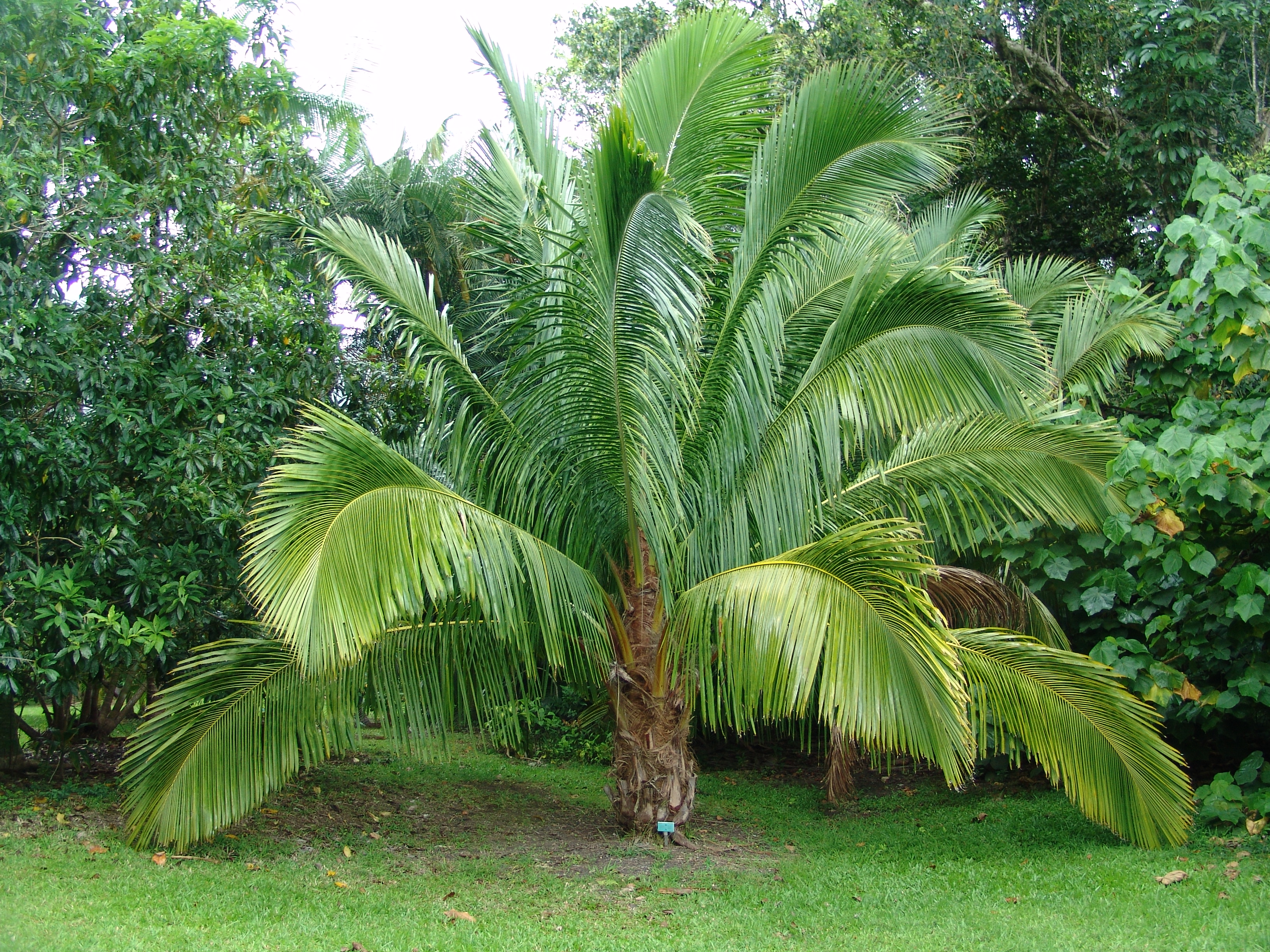

Conservation status
- Vulnerable (IUCN 3.1)
- CITES Appendix II (CITES)

Scientific classification
- Kingdom: Plantae
- Clade: Tracheophytes
- Clade: Angiosperms
- Clade: Monocots
- Clade: Commelinids
- Order: Arecales
- Family: Arecaceae
- Genus: Beccariophoenix
- Species: B. madagascariensis

Binomial name
- Beccariophoenix madagascariensis Jum. & H.Perrier

= Beccariophoenix madagascariensis =

Species of palm

Beccariophoenix madagascariensis, commonly known as the coastal beccariophoenix, is a species of flowering plant in the family Arecaceae. It is a large Coconut relative that is vulnerable in its habitat in Madagascar.

== Range and habitat ==
Beccariophoenix madagascariensis is native to Madagascar's eastern rainforests, between Tolagnaro and Mantadia.

It is found in humid lowland forest and mid-elevation humid montane forest from sea level to 1,200 meters elevation. It is found in forests with a slightly open canopy, typically on poor soils derived from white sand or on podzolized ridge tops.

There are only three known populations, which are severely fragmented. There are an estimated 900 mature individual trees.

== Similar species ==
Beccariophoenix fenestralis was previously considered a variety of this species. It is quite different when a seedling, in having wide, mostly unsplit leaves, whereas B. madagascariensis has fully split, very stiff upright leaves when young.

== Use ==
Young leaflets are used to make hats.
