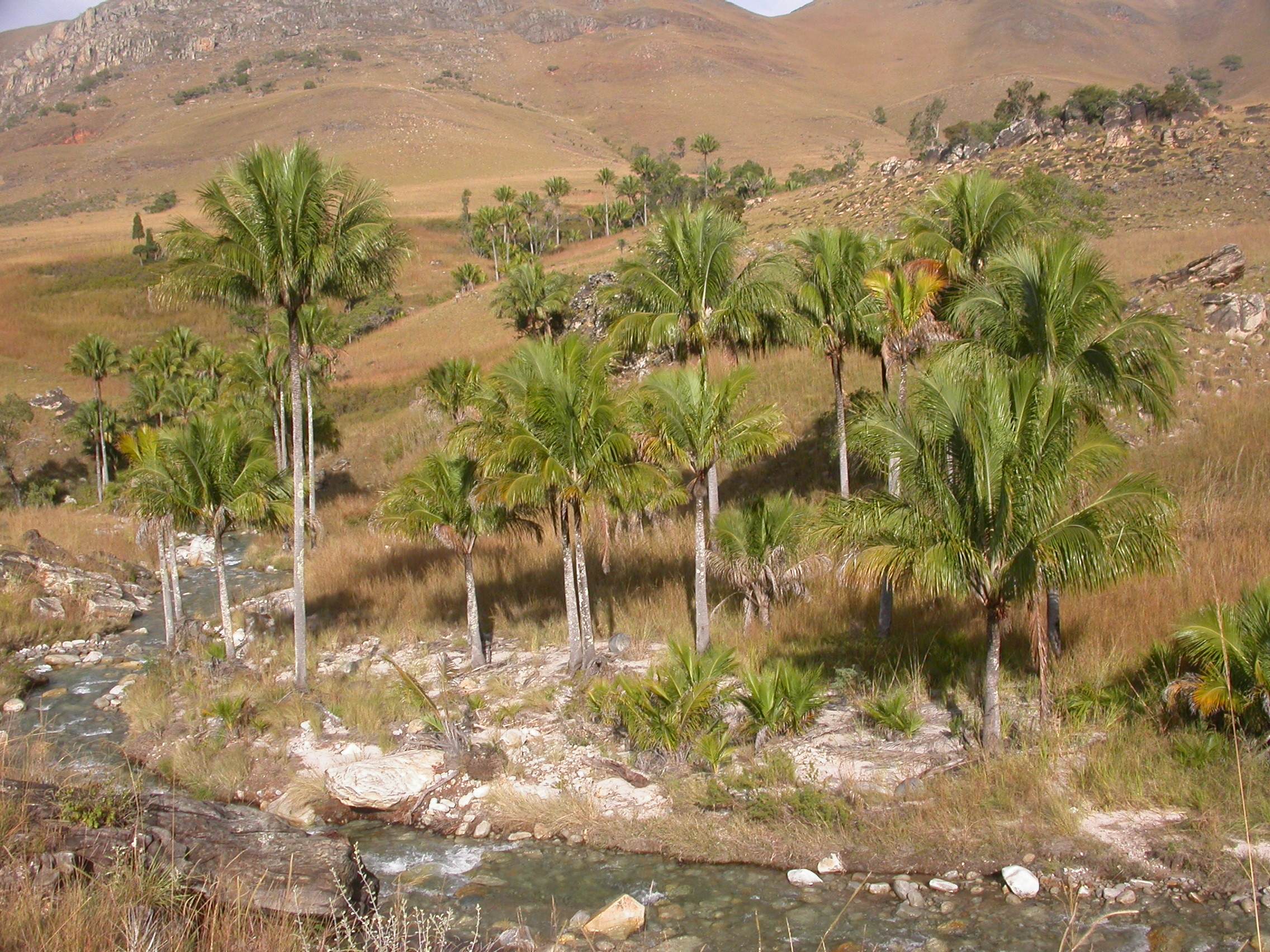
- In natural habitat of Madagascar

Conservation status
- Vulnerable (IUCN 3.1)

Scientific classification
- Kingdom: Plantae
- Clade: Tracheophytes
- Clade: Angiosperms
- Clade: Monocots
- Clade: Commelinids
- Order: Arecales
- Family: Arecaceae
- Genus: Beccariophoenix
- Species: B. alfredii

Binomial name
- Beccariophoenix alfredii Rakotoarinivo, Ranarivelo & J.Dransf.

= Beccariophoenix alfredii =

Species of palm

Beccariophoenix alfredii, also known as the high plateau coconut palm, is a recently discovered species of Arecaceae (palms), endemic to Madagascar. It is in the genus Beccariophoenix, and is closely related to the genus Cocos. Beccariophoenix alfredii is very similar in appearance to the coconut palm, although somewhat cold hardy, making it a good look-alike for the coconut in cooler climates.

== Description ==
Beccariophoenix alfredii grows up to 50 ft (15 m) in height with a trunk up to 1 ft (30 cm) in diameter. The trunk is unarmed and bare, with closely ringed leaf scars. The crown holds 30–36 pinnate leaves, which reach lengths of 4.5 m (15 ft). Each leaf holds approximately 120 pairs of leaflets. The leaflets are very slender and crowded at the base, and are either rigid or somewhat pendulous. Towards the base of the leaf, leaflets are about 47 cm (19 in) long and 1 cm wide. Mid-leaf leaflets are at their largest, being about 112 cm (44 in) long and 4 cm (2 in) wide. At the tip of the leaf, leaflets become smaller again, being 65 cm (26 in) long and 1.8 cm (1 in) wide. Dead leaves are marcescent in juvenile palms, but abscise (naturally fall off the tree) neatly in adults.

The inflorescence is infrafoliar and surrounded by a 90 cm (35 in) long, leathery spathe, which curls up on itself after abscission (due to drying out). The inflorescence stalk is 8–13 cm (3.1–5.1 in) long and elliptic in cross-section. The rachis is very short, 8–9 cm (3.1–3.5 in) long and bearing about 30–50 crowded, spirally arranged rachillae. The fruit is oblate, 1.6 cm × 2.4 cm (0.6 in × 0.9 in) and dark purplish-black at maturity.

== Systematics and botanical history ==
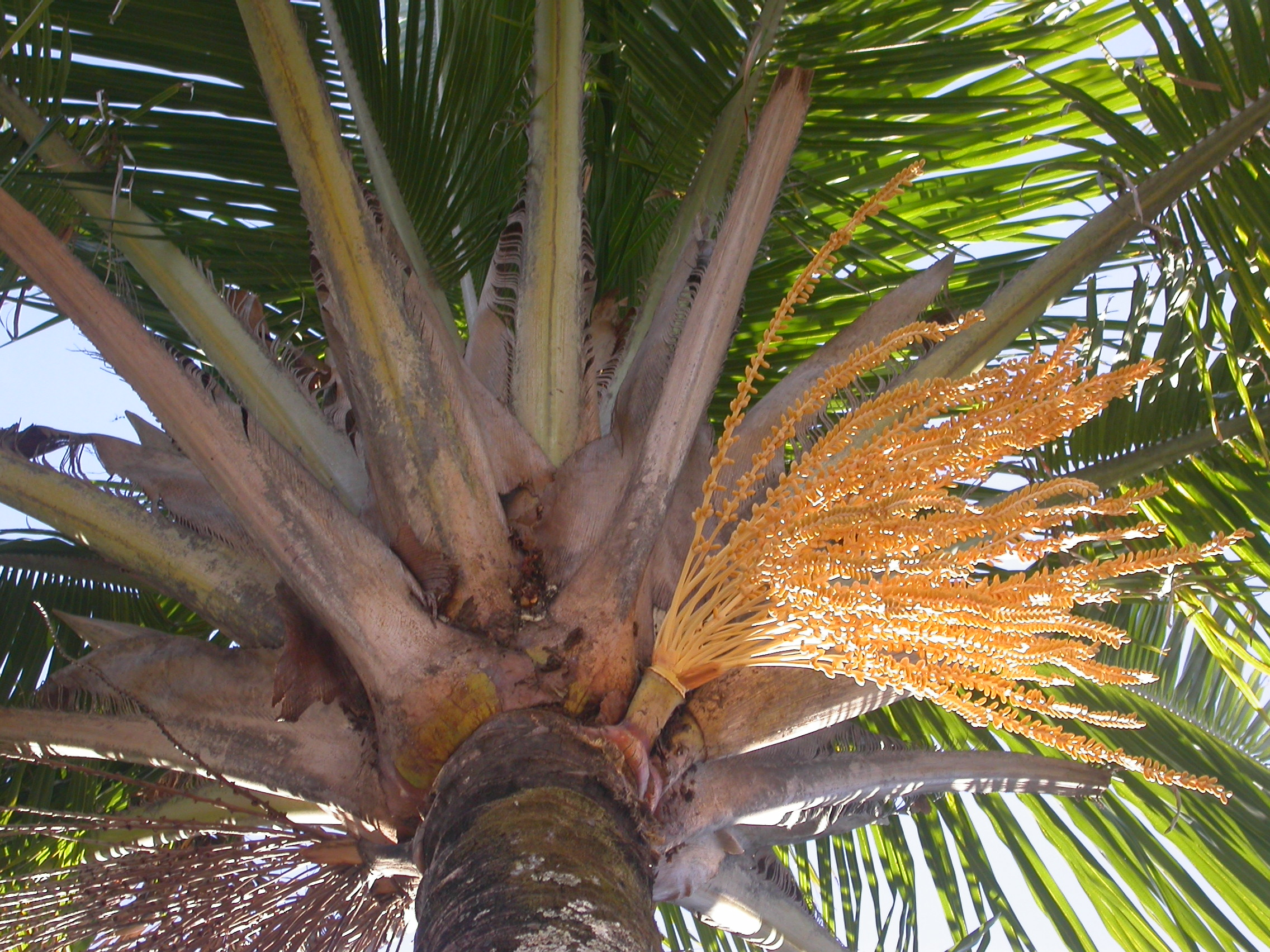
Inflorescence seen from below

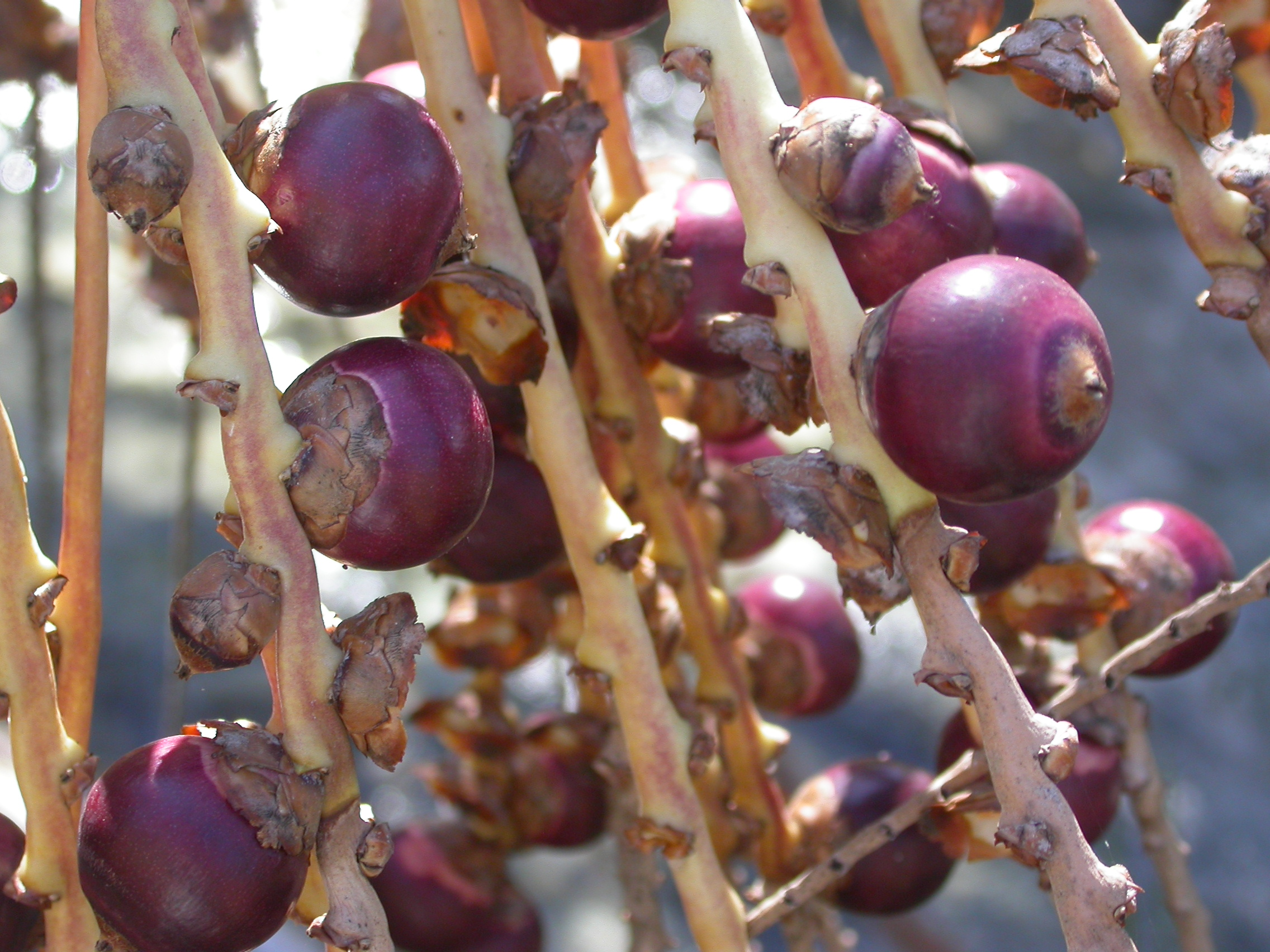
Fruit of Beccariophoenix alfredii

Beccariophoenix is placed in the subfamily Arecoideae and the tribe Cocoseae. The species was first noted in 2002, when Alfred Razafindratsira noticed a picture of a Beccariophoenix species in photographs taken of the vegetation surrounding Andrembesoa (originally taken in search of a species of Pachypodium in the rocky escarpments to the southwest of Antsirabe). Alfred found this odd, considering this area of Madagascar is far from the other localities of Beccariophoenix and is, furthermore, ecologically totally different from the east coast and littoral forests where the other Beccariophoenix species are known to occur. On a day in May 2004 an expedition was mounted into the High Plateau of Madagascar in order to confirm the existence of this species. On the fourth day of the expedition the new population of Beccariophoenix was found.

This species is noted for having oblate (flattened spheroid) rather than ovoid fruit, infrafoliar inflorescence (rather than interfoliar), a peduncle not exceeding 13 cm long (rather than one up to 120 cm long), a 3–5 mm thick leathery peduncular bract which rolls up on when itself when abscised (rather than a heavily lignified peduncular bract 30–40 mm thick, which does not deform when abscised) and 15 stamens (rather than 18–21). Due to these differences, Beccariophoenix alfredii was classified as a new species. B. alfredii was accepted by Kew World Checklist of Selected Plant Families as of 2010.

== Habitat and distribution ==
Beccariophoenix alfredii occurs in the High Plateau of Madagascar at approximately 20° S. The palm is found at an elevation of 1,050 m (3,440 ft) growing along the sandy riverbeds. The surrounding vegetation is mainly composed of various grasses, and the area sees occasional fires. Due to the environment that B. alfredii is subjected to, it is hardy against frost and cold, fire, drought, and full sun. The seeds of B. alfredii are an important food source for lemurs, notably the black lemur, as the seeds ripen between the months of March and June, a time of relative scarcity of food in the area. Lemurs therefore play an important role in the seed dispersal in Madagascar. Indeed, germination trials found that seeds which passed through the gut of lemurs sprouted faster and in greater numbers than seeds not eaten by lemurs. Thus, it seems highly likely that lemurs are the main seed dispersers of B. madagascariensis and B. alfredii.

== Cultivation ==
Due to its overall hardiness, B. alfredii is a good candidate for cultivation in central and northern Florida, southern California, south Texas, southern Arizona and also locations such as Sydney, Australia, and the North Island of New Zealand. It is best grown in sandy loam soils, but is suitable to many other soil types. It can be expected that after it is less new to cultivation, it may become extremely popular worldwide due to its coconut look-alike status, moderate growth rate, and cold hardiness. Mid-size specimens to 40 feet tall are common in Central Florida.

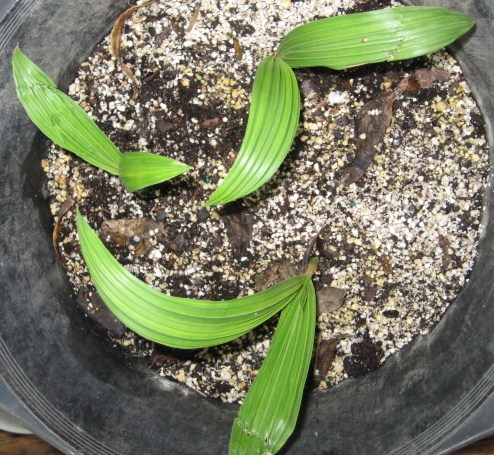
Seedlings
