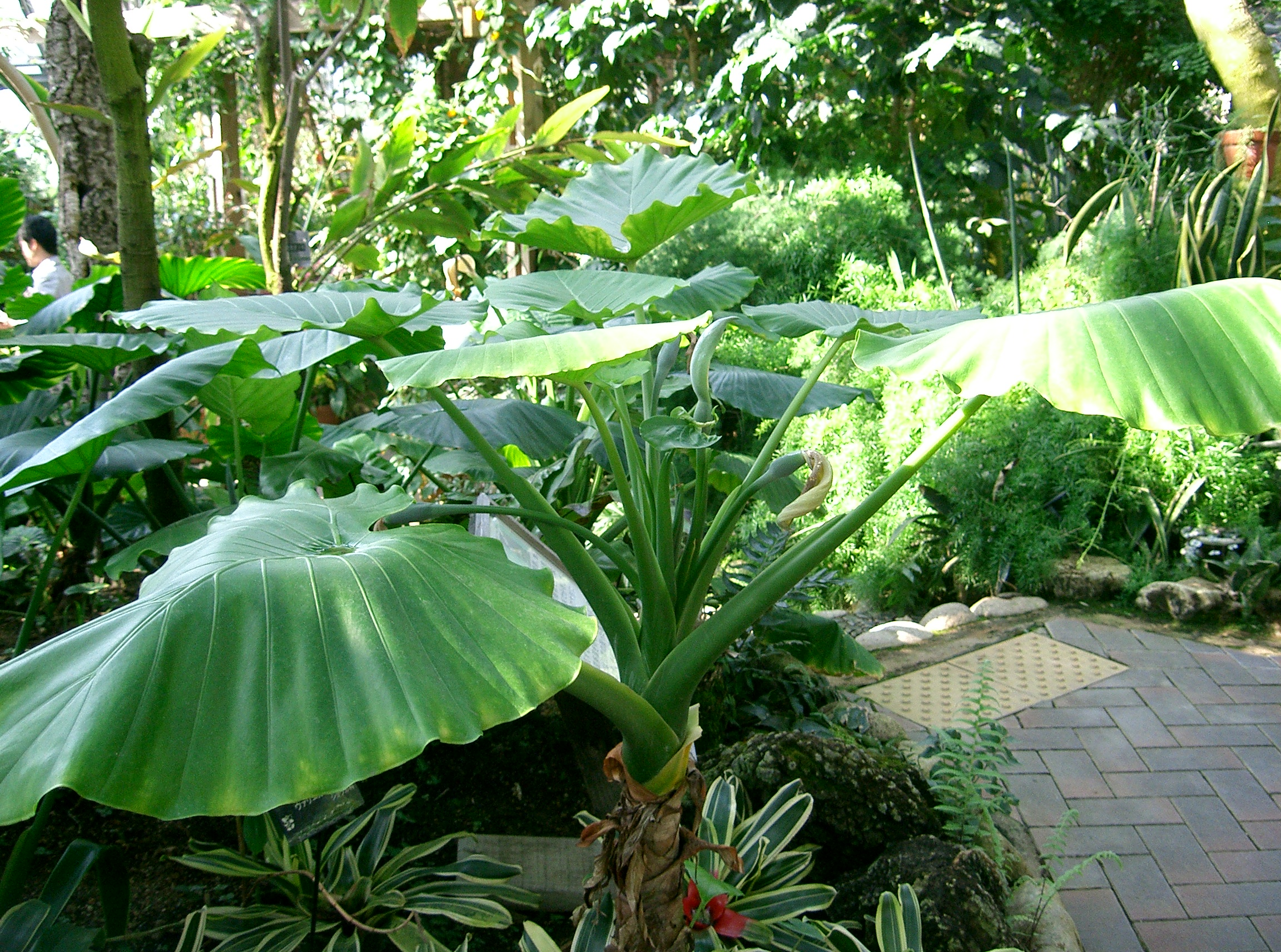

Scientific classification
- Kingdom: Plantae
- Clade: Embryophytes
- Clade: Tracheophytes
- Clade: Spermatophytes
- Clade: Angiosperms
- Clade: Monocots
- Order: Alismatales
- Family: Araceae
- Genus: Alocasia
- Species: A. odora

Binomial name
- Alocasia odora (G.Lodd.) Spach

Synonyms
- Caladium odorum Ker Gawl.; Arum odorum (Ker Gawl.) Roxb.; Colocasia odora (Ker Gawl.) Brongn.; Arum odoratum Heynh.; Alocasia commutata Schott; Caladium odoratissimum K.Koch; Alocasia tonkinensis Engl.

= Alocasia odora =

Species of flowering plant

Alocasia odora, also known as night-scented lily, Asian taro or giant upright elephant ear, is a species of flowering plant in the arum family native to East and Southeast Asia (Japan, China, Indochina, Assam, Bangladesh, Borneo, Taiwan). Traditionally, A. odora is sometime used as a medicine for the treatment of the common cold in Vietnam.

== Description ==
This species of Alocasia grows to about 0.5–1.6 m high, or just over 5 feet, with corms measuring 4 cm to around 10 cm in diameter and 3–5 cm wide. The leaves are big, diamond-blade-shaped, slightly “teardrop” in form, but ovate, with a light green hue and a cordate base. The petioles are 0.3–1.0 m long, with the lower parts clasped around the stem.

== Uses ==
Alocasia odora leaves and stems are used as a green vegetable in the cuisines of Southeast Asia, and often used to flavor soups or stir-fried dishes. The leaves and stems should not be consumed raw, nor should any of the green plant material. At certain Asian or specialty markets, it is usually peeled and boiled to be sold either frozen, bagged in its own liquids, or canned.

Nonetheless, the plant is actually inedible when raw, and may cause mild to significant gastrointestinal discomfort, due to the composition of its leaves, which are covered in microscopic, needle-shaped raphides (or calcium oxalate crystals). Consumption of undercooked aroid leaves can result in several uncomfortable symptoms; side effects range from an itchy, sharp sensation in the esophagus, similar to a feeling of “broken glass” or sand being swallowed (usually lasting no more than several hours), to abdominal pain, hot and cold flashes, nausea and vomiting. However, similarly to another, more common taro plant, Colocasia esculenta, the corm (root bulb) of A. odora is sometimes boiled and mashed like potatoes. As with the green plant material, the corm should also not be consumed raw or undercooked. In Japan, there are several cases of food poisoning by accidental consumption. The Ministry of Health, Labour and Welfare warned not to eat A. odora, which looks similar to edible Leucocasia gigantea or the aforementioned C. esculenta.

Typical of leafy green vegetables—and despite its toxicity if prepared incorrectly—the leaves of this plant are rich in vitamins and minerals, including thiamin, riboflavin, iron, phosphorus and zinc. Additionally, they are a very good source of vitamin B_{6}, vitamin C, niacin, potassium, copper, and manganese. Taro corms are very high in starch, while being somewhat less starchy than potatoes; the forms are a good source of dietary fiber. Like its stems and leaves, oxalic acid may yet be present in the corm, albeit in trace amounts.

== Taxonomy and etymology ==
Alocasia odora is named odora because of the flowers that produce a fragrance which is especially strong at night. The scent is sometimes described as being pleasant and sweet.
