= Alocasia atropurpurea =

Conservation status
- Critically Endangered (IUCN 3.1)

Scientific classification
- Kingdom: Plantae
- Clade: Tracheophytes
- Clade: Angiosperms
- Clade: Monocots
- Order: Alismatales
- Family: Araceae
- Genus: Alocasia
- Species: A. atropurpurea

Binomial name
- Alocasia atropurpurea Engl.

Species of flowering plant from the Philippines

Alocasia atropurpurea is a flowering plant in the family Araceae endemic to northern Luzon in the Philippines. It is classified as Critically Endangered by the IUCN Red List of Threatened Species and has only been recorded in Mount Polis and an unspecified locality in the Mountain Province.

== Taxonomy ==
Alocasia atropurpurea was first described by the German botanist Adolf Engler in Das Pflanzenreich in 1920. The type specimen was collected from Mount Polis in 1913. The specific epithet atropurpurea is Latin for "dark purple-colored", referring to the distinctive color of the spathe. It is a member of the genus Alocasia in the arum family Araceae.

== Distribution ==
Alocasia atropurpurea is endemic to northern Luzon in the Philippines. It has only been recorded in Mount Polis and an unspecified locality in the Mountain Province.

== Description ==
Alocasia atropurpurea is a large robust plant with large heart-shaped leaves that are around 40 cm (16 in) long. The petioles can reach a length of 50 cm (20 in). The spathe of the flower is around 14 cm (5.5 in) long with a deep purple-brown blade (hence its name). The lower spathe is 4 cm (1.6 in) long and rounded. The spadix is a little shorter than the spathe.

== See also ==
- Alocasia micholitziana
- Alocasia nycteris
- Alocasia sanderiana
- Alocasia sinuata
- Alocasia zebrina
- Alocasia heterophylla
- List of threatened species of the Philippines
