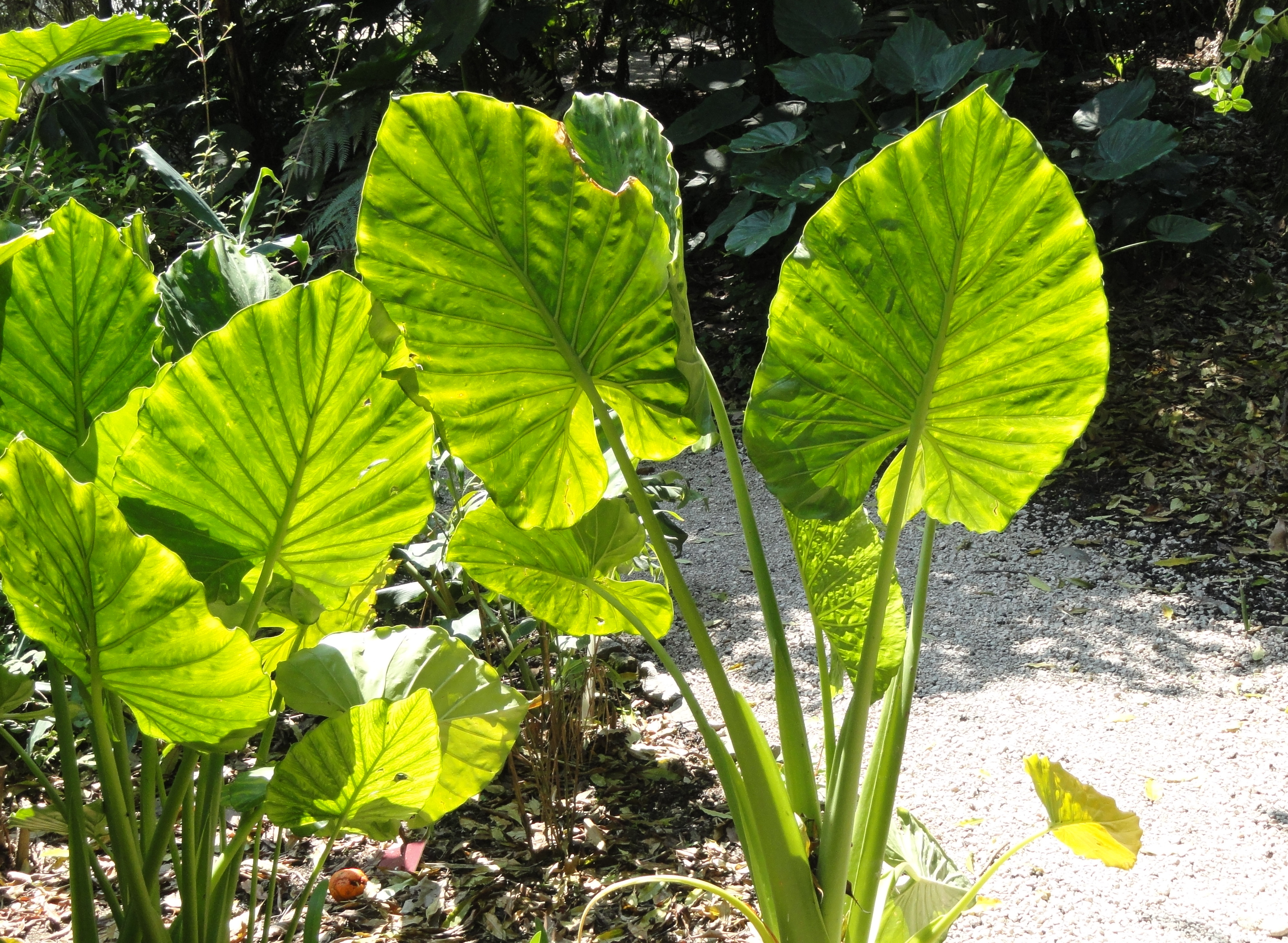
- Alocasia macrorrhizos

Scientific classification
- Kingdom: Plantae
- Clade: Embryophytes
- Clade: Tracheophytes
- Clade: Angiosperms
- Clade: Monocots
- Order: Alismatales
- Family: Araceae
- Subfamily: Aroideae
- Tribe: Colocasieae
- Genus: Alocasia (Schott) G.Don

Type species
- Alocasia cucullata (Schott) G.Don
- Range of the genus Alocasia.

Synonyms
- Ensolenanthe Schott; Schizocasia Schott; Xenophya Schott; Panzhuyuia Z.Y.Zhu

= Alocasia =

Genus of flowering plant

Alocasia is a genus of rhizomatous or tuberous, broad-leaved, perennial, flowering plants from the family Araceae. There are about 90 accepted species native to tropical and subtropical Asia and eastern Australia. Around the world, many growers widely cultivate a range of hybrids and cultivars as ornamentals.

== Description ==
The large, cordate or sagittate leaves grow to a length of 20 to 90 cm (8 to 35 in) on long petioles. Their araceous flowers grow at the end of a short stalk, but are not conspicuous; often hidden behind the leaf petioles.

The corms of some species can be processed to make them edible, however, the raw plants contain raphid or raphide crystals of calcium oxalate along with other irritants (possibly including proteases) that can numb and swell the tongue and pharynx. This can cause difficulty breathing and sharp pain in the throat. Lower parts of the plant contain the highest concentrations of the poison.

Prolonged boiling before serving or processing may reduce risk of adverse reactions. Additionally, acidic fruit such as tamarind may dissolve the raphides altogether. It's important to note, however, that this genus varies in toxicity, and can still be dangerous to ingest, even after taking precautions.

== Species ==
As of August 2026, there are 91 accepted species of Alocasia. The list below includes those accepted species with their common names (where available) and distribution ranges:

Flower	Leaf	Scientific name	Distribution
		Alocasia acuminata Schott	Indonesia
		Alocasia aequiloba N.E.Br.	New Guinea
		Alocasia alba Schott	Sri Lanka
		Alocasia arifolia Hallier f.	Malaysia
		Alocasia atropurpurea Engl.	Philippines
		Alocasia augustiana L.Linden & Rodigas	New Guinea
		Alocasia azlanii K.M.Wong & P.C.Boyce	Brunei
		Alocasia baginda Kurniawan & P.C.Boyce	Kalimantan
		Alocasia balgooyi A.Hay	Sulawesi
		Alocasia beccarii Engl.	Malaysia
		Alocasia boa A.Hay	New Guinea
Alocasia boyceana flower	Alocasia boyceana	Alocasia boyceana A.Hay	Philippines
		Alocasia brancifolia (Schott) A.Hay	New Guinea
		Alocasia brisbanensis (F.M.Bailey) Domin: Cunjevoi, spoon lily	Australia
		Alocasia cadieri Chantrier	SE Asia
		Alocasia celebica Engl. ex Koord	Sulawesi
		Alocasia chaii P.C.Boyce	Sarawak
		Alocasia clypeolata A.Hay: Green shield	Philippines
		Alocasia cucullata (Lour.) G.Don in R.Sweet: Chinese taro	Southeast Asia
		Alocasia culionensis Engl.	Philippines
		Alocasia cuprea K.Koch	Borneo
		Alocasia decipiens Schott	Indonesia
		Alocasia decumbens Buchet	Vietnam
		Alocasia devansayana (L.Linden & Rodigas) Engl.	New Guinea
		Alocasia epilithica Serebryanyi, K.Z. Hein & Naive	Myanmar
		Alocasia evrardii Gagnep. ex V.D.Nguyen	Cambodia to central Vietnam
		Alocasia fallax Schott	East Himalaya to Bangladesh
		Alocasia farisii Zulhazman, Norziel. & P.C.Boyce	Peninsular Malaysia
		Alocasia flabellifera A.Hay	New Guinea
		Alocasia flemingiana Yuzammi & A.Hay	Java
		Alocasia fornicata (Roxb.) Schott	India, Indonesia
		Alocasia gageana Engl. & K.Krause in H.G.A.Engler	Burma
		Alocasia grata Prain ex Engl. & Krause in H.G.A.Engler	Indonesia
		Alocasia hainanica N.E.Br.	Hainan to N. Vietnam
		Alocasia hararganjensis H.Ara & M.A.Hassan	Bangladesh
		Alocasia heterophylla (C.Presl) Merr.	Philippines
		Alocasia hollrungii Engl.	New Guinea
		Alocasia hypoleuca P.C.Boyce	Thailand
		Alocasia indica (Lour.) Spach	India, SE Asia, Java
		Alocasia infernalis P.C.Boyce	Borneo
		Alocasia inornata Hallier f.	Sumatra
		Alocasia jiewhoei V.D.Nguyen	Cambodia
		Alocasia kerinciensis A.Hay	Sumatra
		Alocasia lancifolia Engl.	New Guinea
		Alocasia lauterbachiana (Engl.) A.Hay	New Guinea
		Alocasia lecomtei Engl.	Vietnam
		Alocasia lihengiae C.L.Long & Q.Fang	Yunnan
		Alocasia longiloba Miq.	Malaysia
		Alocasia macrorrhizos (L.) G.Don in R.Sweet: Giant taro, elephant ear, ape flower	SE Asia, Australia, Pacific
		Alocasia maquilingensis Merr.	Philippines
		Alocasia megawatiae Yuzammi & A.Hay	Sulawesi
		Alocasia melo A.Hay	Borneo
		Alocasia micholitziana Sander: Green velvet alocasia	Philippines
		Alocasia minuscula A.Hay	Borneo
		Alocasia monticola A.Hay	New Guinea
		Alocasia navicularis (K.Koch & C.D.Bouché) K.Koch & C.D.Bouché	Himalaya
		Alocasia nebula A.Hay	Borneo
		Alocasia nicolsonii A.Hay	New Guinea
		Alocasia nycteris Medecilo, G.C.Yao & Madulid: Batwing alocasia	Philippines
		Alocasia odora (Lindl.) K.Koch: Night-scented lily	SE Asia, China
		Alocasia × okinawensis Tawada	Okinawa
		Alocasia pangeran A.Hay	Borneo
		Alocasia peltata M.Hotta	Borneo
		Alocasia perakensis Hemsl.	Malaysia
		Alocasia portei Schott	Luzon
		Alocasia princeps W.Bull	Malaysia
		Alocasia principiculus A.Hay	Borneo
		Alocasia puber (Hassk.) Schott	Java
		Alocasia puteri A.Hay	Borneo
		Alocasia pyrospatha A.Hay	New Guinea
		Alocasia ramosii A.Hay	Philippines
		Alocasia reginae N.E.Br.	Borneo
		Alocasia reginula A.Hay: Black velvet	Sabah
		Alocasia reversa N.E.Br.	Philippines
		Alocasia ridleyi A.Hay	Borneo
		Alocasia rivularis Luu, Nguyen-Phi & H.T.Van	Vietnam
		Alocasia robusta M.Hotta	Borneo
		Alocasia salarkhanii H.Ara & M.A.Hassan	Bangladesh
		Alocasia sanderiana W.Bull	Philippines
		Alocasia sarawakensis M.Hotta	Borneo
		Alocasia scabriuscula N.E.Br.	Borneo
		Alocasia scalprum A.Hay: Samar lance	Philippines
		Alocasia simonsiana A.Hay	New Guinea
		Alocasia sinuata N.E.Br.	Philippines
		Alocasia suhirmaniana Yuzammi & A.Hay	Sulawesi
		Alocasia venusta A.Hay	Borneo
		Alocasia vietnamensis V.D.Nguyen	central Vietnam
		Alocasia wentii Engl. & K.Krause: New Guinea shield	New Guinea
		Alocasia wongii A.Hay	Borneo
		Alocasia yunqiana Z.X.Ma, Yifan Li & J.T.Yin	Yunnan
		Alocasia zebrina Veitch ex J.Dix	Philippines

=== Nothospecies ===
The following list is incomplete.

The following are hybrid species in the genus Alocasia:

- A. × mortfontanensis André = A. longiloba × A. sanderiana (syn. A. × amazonica)

== Cultivation ==
Alocasia are tropical plants that are increasingly becoming popular as houseplants. The hybrid A. × amazonica has gained the Royal Horticultural Society's Award of Garden Merit. They are typically grown as pot plants, but a better way is to grow the plants permanently in the controlled conditions of a greenhouse. They can tolerate dim light and cannot withstand direct sunlight. They should be cared for as any other tropical plant, with weekly leaf cleaning, frequent fertilization, and medium to high humidity.

They rarely survive cold winters or the dryness of artificial heating, but an attempt to slowly acclimatize plants from the summer garden to the house can help. Once inside, the watering period must be reduced, and the plants should be protected from spider mites or red spider mites.

== See also ==
- Colocasia
- Philodendron
