= Alocasia wentii =

Scientific classification
- Kingdom: Plantae
- Clade: Embryophytes
- Clade: Tracheophytes
- Clade: Spermatophytes
- Clade: Angiosperms
- Clade: Monocots
- Order: Alismatales
- Family: Araceae
- Genus: Alocasia
- Species: A. wentii

Binomial name
- Alocasia wentii Engl. & K.Krause

Species of flowering plant

Alocasia wentii is a species of flowering plant in the family Araceae, native to the highlands of New Guinea.

== Cultivation ==
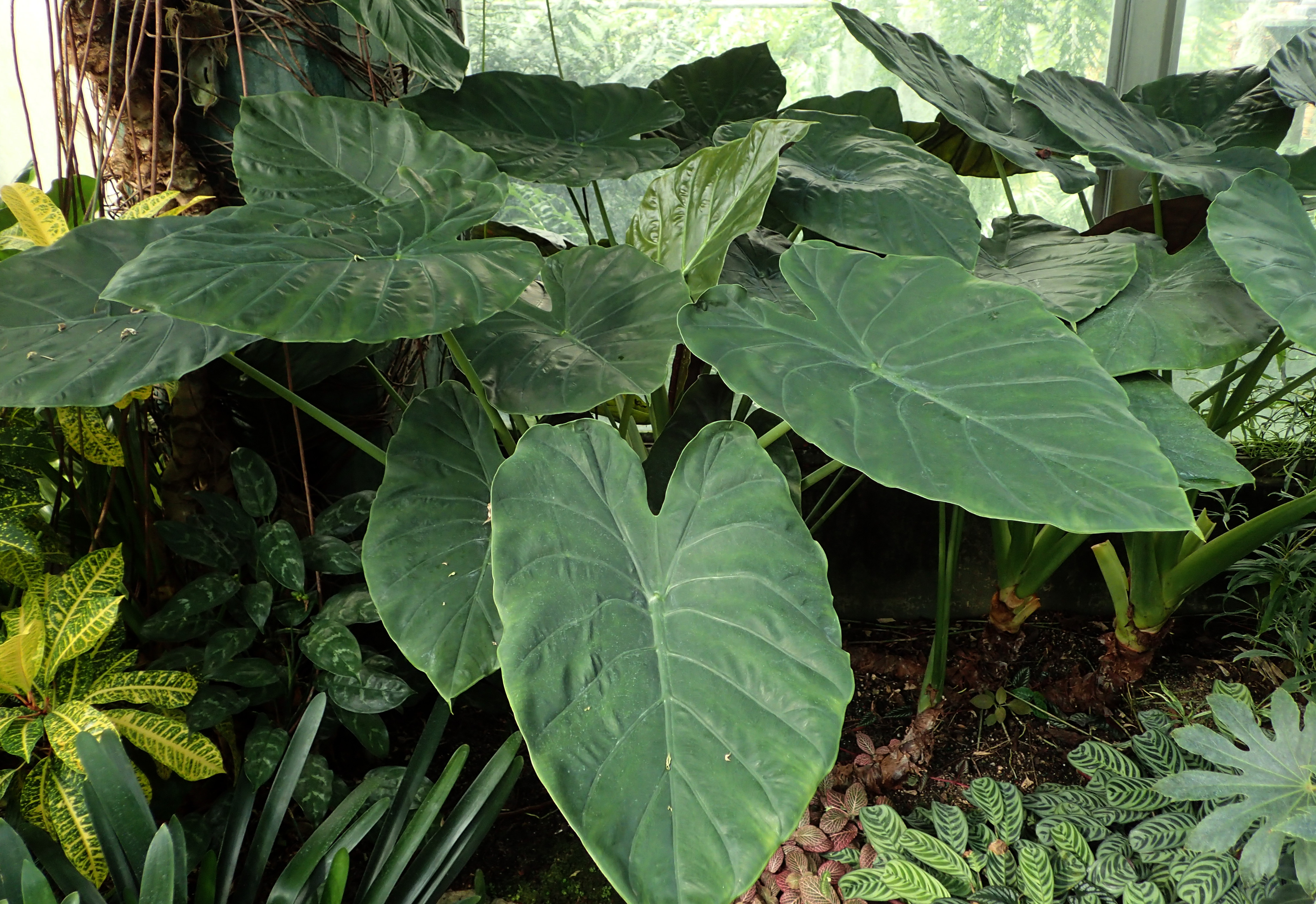
Plants sold in the ornamental trade as Alocasia wentii (shown in photo) are likely hybrids between A. cuprea and A. odora. At the Lincoln Park Conservatory, Chicago.

Plants sold in the ornamental trade as Alocasia wentii, commonly known as hardy elephant's ear, appear to be hybrids of other Alocasia species rather than the true species from New Guinea. The true Alocasia wentii is a diminute species with dark green, sagittate leaves, while cultivated plants have large peltate purple leaves.

The purple-leaved plants appear to be hybrids of Alocasia cuprea and possibly Alocasia odora, are polyploid and seemingly sterile. They may be the same as Alocasia 'Uhinki', an artificial hybrid between these species created pre-1897 in the nursery of the Chantrier brothers in Mortefontaine, France. Alocasia 'Uhinki' was subsequently misspelled "Alocasia whinkii" in nursery catalogues, possibly resulting in its confusion with the similar-sounding Alocasia wentii.

Variegated cultivars of this hybrid are also commercially available.
