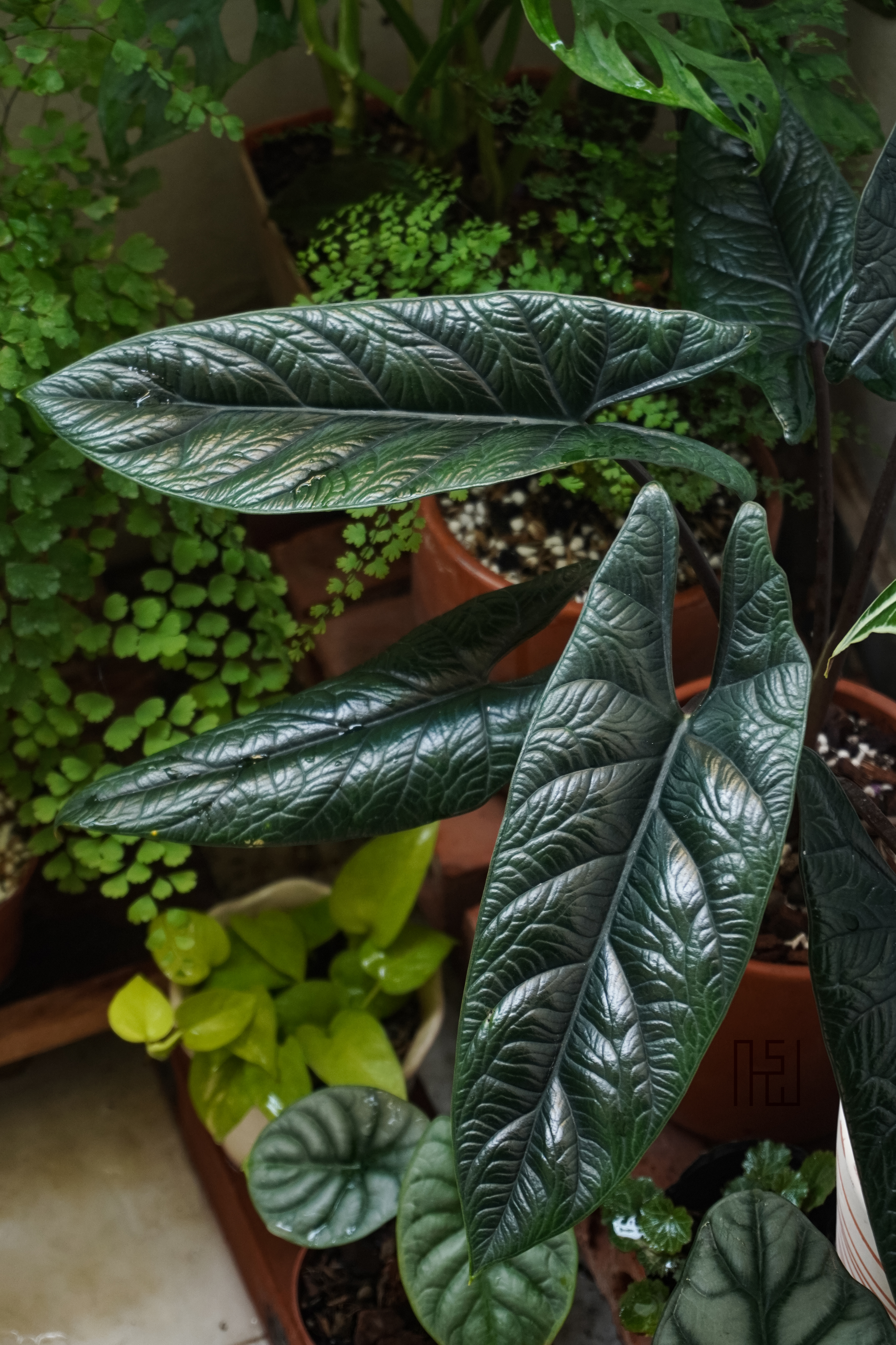

Scientific classification
- Kingdom: Plantae
- Clade: Embryophytes
- Clade: Tracheophytes
- Clade: Spermatophytes
- Clade: Angiosperms
- Clade: Monocots
- Order: Alismatales
- Family: Araceae
- Genus: Alocasia
- Species: A. scalprum

Binomial name
- Alocasia scalprum A.Hay

= Alocasia scalprum =

Species of flowering plant

Alocasia scalprum, the Samar lance, is a species of flowering plant in the family Araceae, native to Samar island, the Philippines. Well known from cultivation as a houseplant in the Philippines, and introduced to aroid enthusiasts as Alocasia cv. Samar Lance in 1984, it was not formally described as a species until 1999. Its glossy, lance-shaped leaves with embossed veins take on a blue sheen when mature. It is similar in appearance to Alocasia heterophylla.
