= Alocasia farisii =

Scientific classification
- Kingdom: Plantae
- Clade: Tracheophytes
- Clade: Angiosperms
- Clade: Monocots
- Order: Alismatales
- Family: Araceae
- Genus: Alocasia
- Species: A. farisii

Binomial name
- Alocasia farisii Zulhazman, Norziel. & P.C.Boyce

Species of flowering plant

Alocasia farisii is a species of flowering plant in the family Araceae.

Alocasia farisii is native to the wet tropical biome of Malaysia.

== Taxonomy ==
The species was first described in 2017, from Karst limestone, in Kelantan, north-east Malaysia.

== Description ==
Alocasia farisii is similar to Alocasia reversa. It is a herb that usually grows to around 27 centimetres (11 in) in height, though it can reach 55 centimetres (22 in). The plant has long underground stems.

The leaves are thin, leathery, and grey-green in the centre. Leaves on younger plants are often shield-shaped, and some leaves may be arrowhead-shaped. Leaves measure 6–13 centimetres (2.4–5.1 in) long, and 4–10 centimetres (1.6–3.9 in) wide. The leaf stalks are 10–25 centimetres (3.9–9.8 in) long. Inflorescences are solitary or in pairs. The plant produces bright orange berries.

The species thrives in conditions of moderate moisture and temperature, and grows in soil pockets on limestone outcrops.

== Nomenclature ==
Alocasia farisii was named after Muhammad V of Kelantan, the Sultan of the Malaysian state of Kelantan. The name recognises his interest in conserving the region's rare species.
