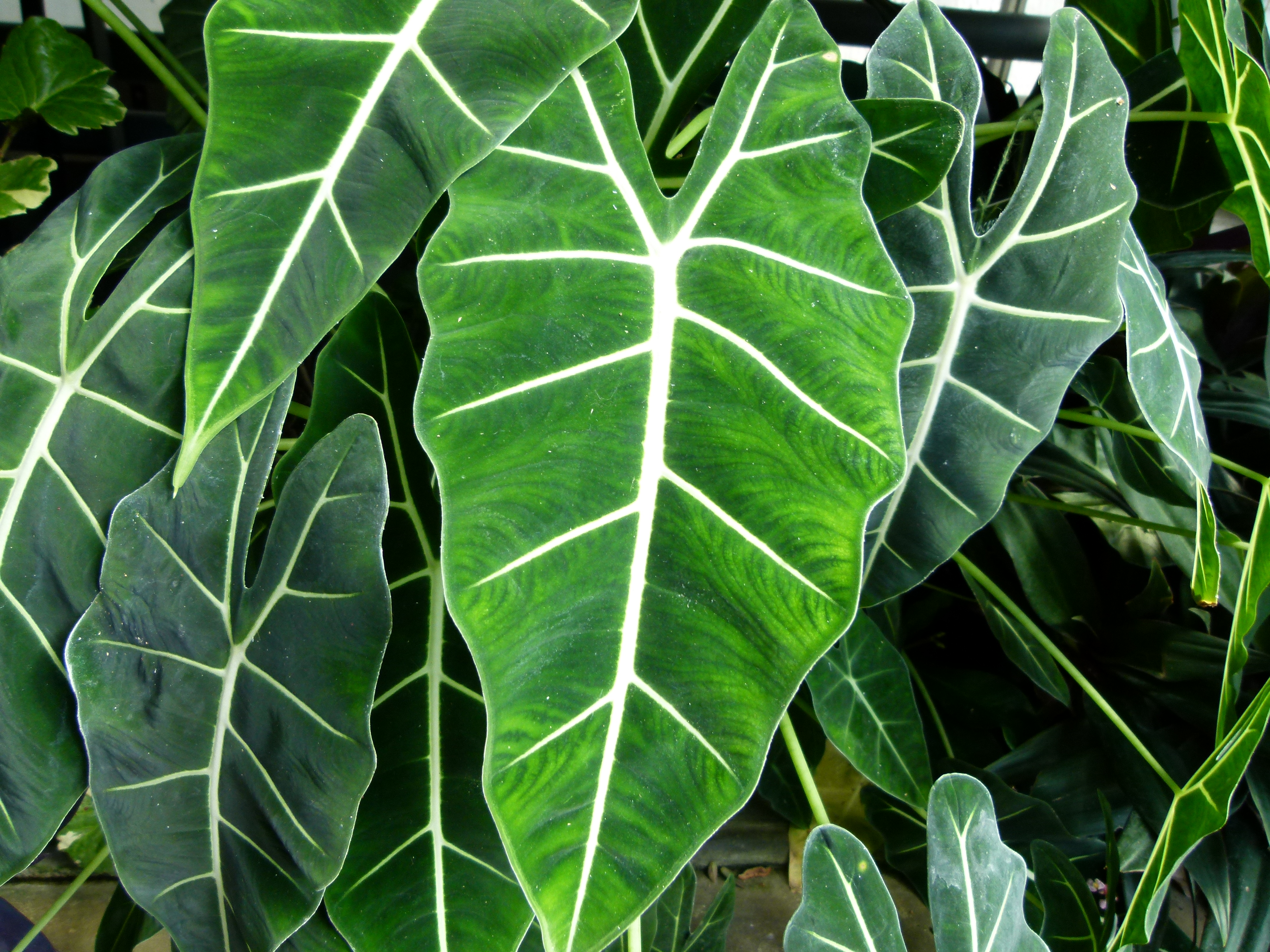
- A cultivated A. micholitziana

Conservation status
- Vulnerable (IUCN 3.1)

Scientific classification
- Kingdom: Plantae
- Clade: Embryophytes
- Clade: Tracheophytes
- Clade: Spermatophytes
- Clade: Angiosperms
- Clade: Monocots
- Order: Alismatales
- Family: Araceae
- Genus: Alocasia
- Species: A. micholitziana

Binomial name
- Alocasia micholitziana Sander

= Alocasia micholitziana =

Species of plant

Alocasia micholitziana, commonly known as the green velvet taro or green velvet alocasia, is a plant in the family Araceae. It is endemic to the island of Luzon in the Philippines. It is commonly grown as an ornamental plant worldwide.

== Taxonomy and etymology ==
The species was first described by Henry Frederick Conrad Sander in 1912. It is named after the German plant collector Wilhelm Micholitz.

== Description ==
Alocasia micholitziana grows to around 50 cm (1.6 ft) tall. It has 4 to 7 leaves. The petioles are about 45 cm (1.48 ft) long and are a mottled brownish, reddish, or purple in color. The leaf blades are a deep matte green in color with a velvety texture on the upper surface, and a paler green on the lower surface. They are sagittate (arrow-shaped) and are around 40 cm (1.3 ft) long and 13 cm (5.1 in) wide. The leaf veins are white in color on the upper surface. The leaf margins are strongly to mildly undulate. It is shallowly peltate.

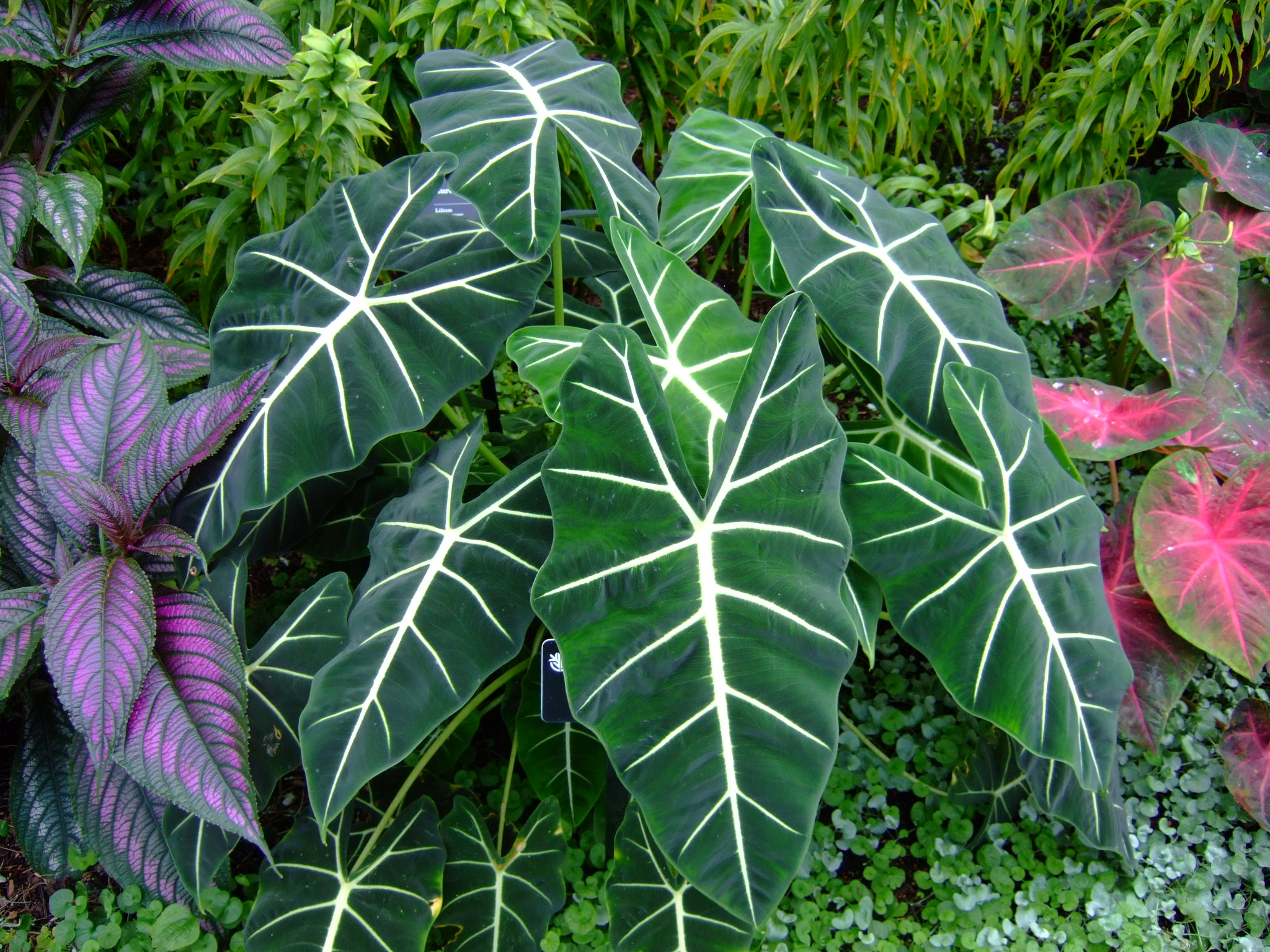
Alocasia micholitziana 'Green Velvet'

They can bear up to 4 flowers together, each around 20 cm (7.9 in) long. The spathe is around 14 cm (5.5 in) and greenish in color. The spadix is shorter than the spathe and cream-colored.

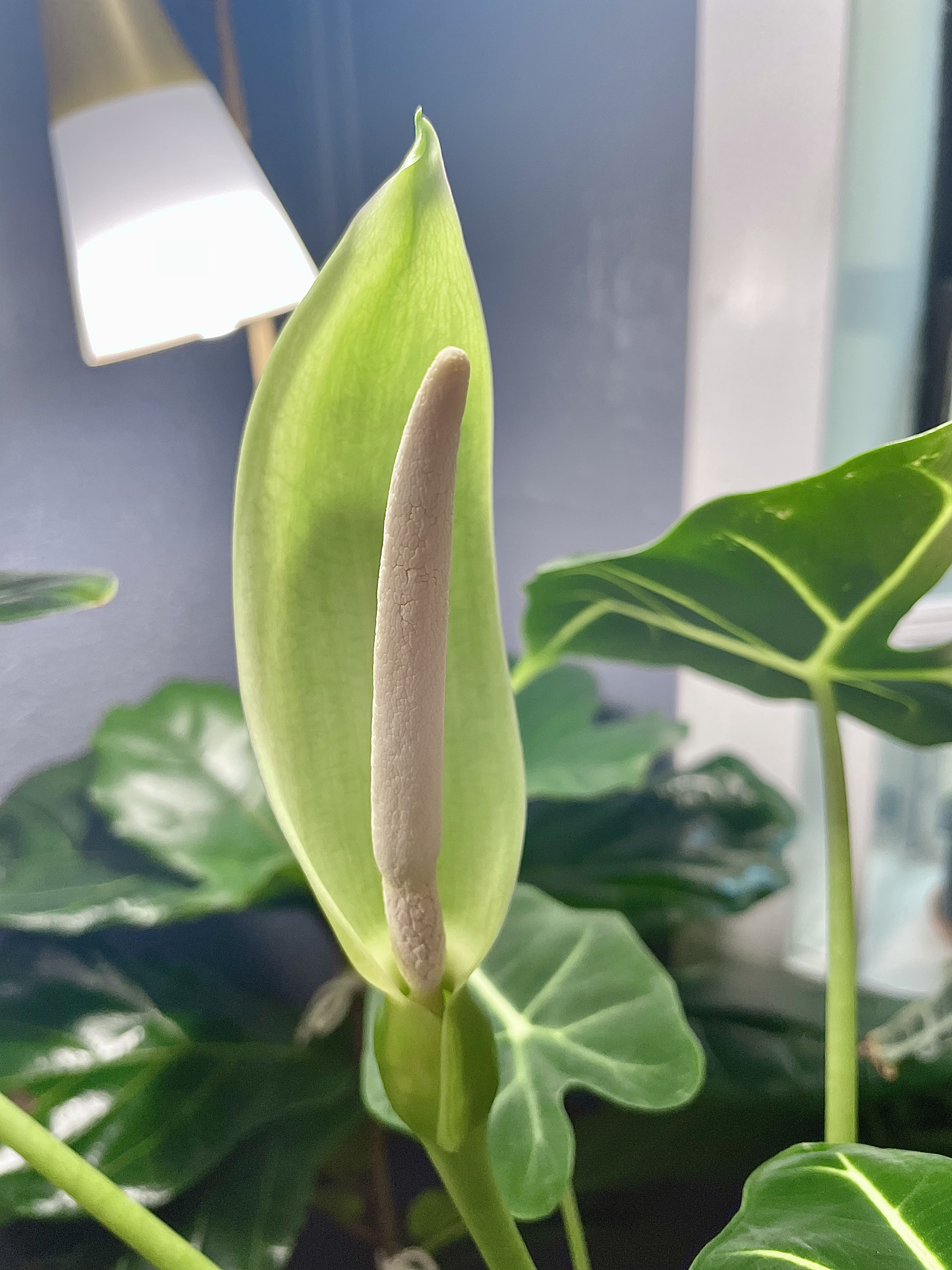
Alocasia micholitziana 'Green Velvet' inflorescence

== Distribution and habitat ==
Alocasia micholitziana is endemic to Apayao, Benguet and Ifugao in northern Luzon in the Philippines. It grows in shady areas in damp lowland forests.

== Uses ==
The plant is propagated by corms and plant division and is a popular ornamental in both the local and international markets. It has produced several cultivars, the most popular of which is Alocasia micholitziana 'Frydek'.

== Conservation ==
Alocasia micholitziana was formerly common in its native range but is now rare due to overcollection. It is classified as vulnerable in the wild by the International Union for Conservation of Nature. Harvesting wild specimens of A. micholitziana is illegal in the Philippines and is punishable with six to ten years imprisonment and a fine of ₱100,000 to ₱1,000,000.

== See also ==
- Alocasia sanderiana
- Alocasia nycteris
- Alocasia sinuata
- Alocasia zebrina
- Alocasia heterophylla
- List of threatened species of the Philippines
