= Alocasia venusta =

Scientific classification
- Kingdom: Plantae
- Clade: Embryophytes
- Clade: Tracheophytes
- Clade: Spermatophytes
- Clade: Angiosperms
- Clade: Monocots
- Order: Alismatales
- Family: Araceae
- Genus: Alocasia
- Species: A. venusta

Binomial name
- Alocasia venusta A.Hay

Species of flowering plant

Alocasia venusta is in the Araceae family and the large tropical genus Alocasia. They are native to Southeast Asia, Borneo, and surrounding tropical forests. Venusta is a rare, shade-loving forest plant, typically growing as undergrowth on moist, shaded slopes. It thrives in humid, darker parts of rainforest habitats with permeable soil.

References: 1. Ara, H., & Hassan, Md. A. (2018). Three new species of Araceae from Bangladesh. Bangladesh Journal of Plant Taxonomy, 25(2), 227–239. https://doi.org/10.3329/bjpt.v25i2.39529 2. Arbain, D., Sinaga, L. M. R., Taher, M., Susanti, D., Zakaria, Z. A., & Khotib, J. (2022). Traditional Uses, Phytochemistry and Biological Activities of Alocasia Species: A Systematic Review. Frontiers in Pharmacology, 13. https://doi.org/10.3389/fphar.2022.849704 3.Nauheimer, L., Boyce, P. C., & Renner, S. S. (2012). Giant taro and its relatives: A phylogeny of the large genus Alocasia (Araceae) sheds light on Miocene floristic exchange in the Malesian region. Molecular Phylogenetics and Evolution, 63(1), 43–51. https://doi.org/10.1016/j.ympev.2011.12.011

Alocasia venusta is a species of flowering plant in the family Araceae, which is found only in the vicinity of the limestone Niah Caves of northern Sarawak, Malaysia. A lithophyte with narrow, canoe-shaped leaves, it is considered obscure even by Alocasia enthusiasts and is rarely found in commerce.
