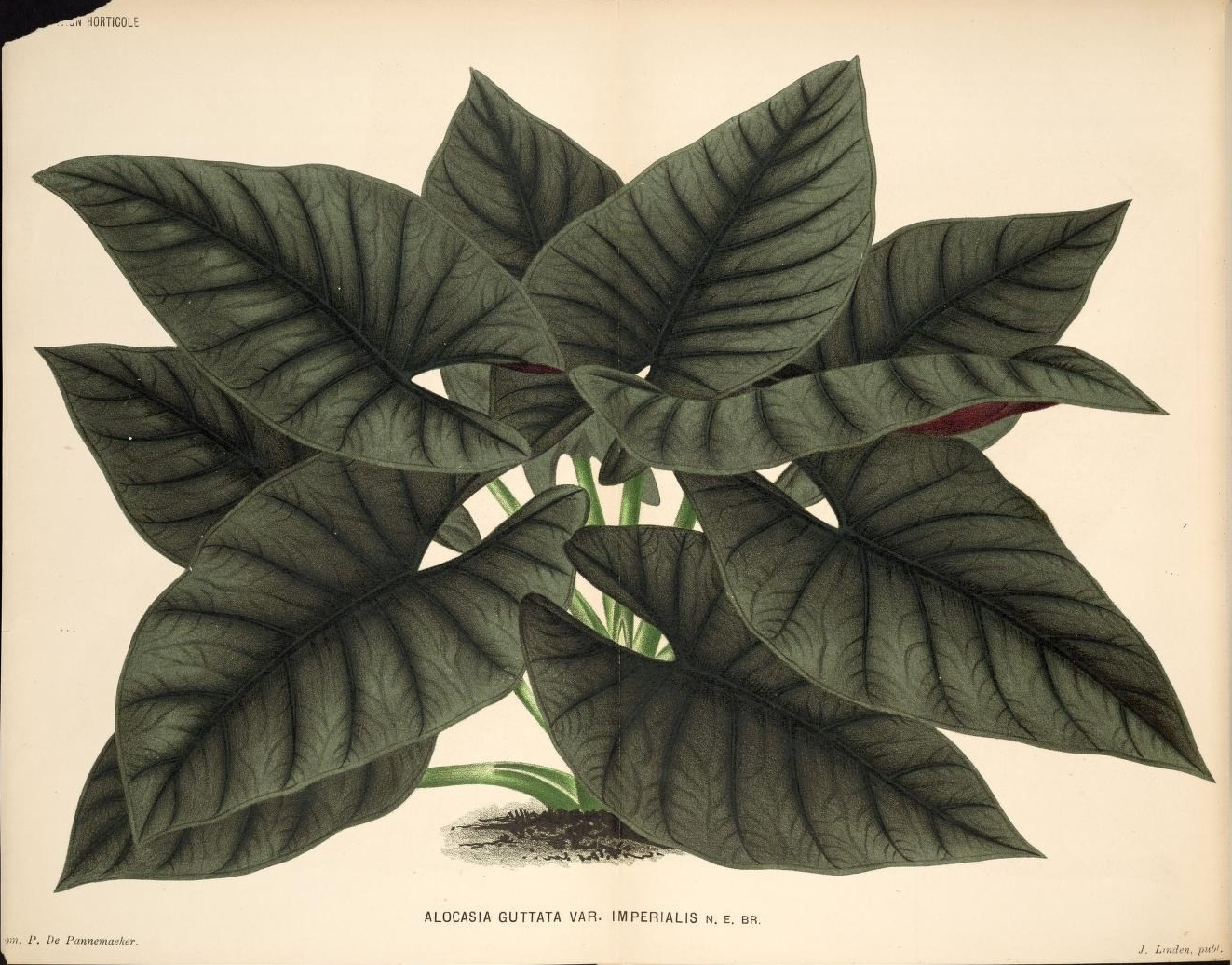
- Given as Alocasia guttata var. imperialis in this botanical illustration

Scientific classification
- Kingdom: Plantae
- Clade: Embryophytes
- Clade: Tracheophytes
- Clade: Spermatophytes
- Clade: Angiosperms
- Clade: Monocots
- Order: Alismatales
- Family: Araceae
- Genus: Alocasia
- Species: A. nebula

Binomial name
- Alocasia nebula A.Hay

= Alocasia nebula =

Species of flowering plant

Alocasia nebula is a species of flowering plant in the family Araceae, native to Sarawak state, Malaysia. As a houseplant it is said to be the most difficult Alocasia to grow.
