= Alocasia princeps =

Scientific classification
- Kingdom: Plantae
- Clade: Embryophytes
- Clade: Tracheophytes
- Clade: Spermatophytes
- Clade: Angiosperms
- Clade: Monocots
- Order: Alismatales
- Family: Araceae
- Genus: Alocasia
- Species: A. princeps

Binomial name
- Alocasia princeps W.Bull

Synonyms
- Alocasia porphyroneura Hallier f.

Species of flowering plant

Alocasia princeps is a species of flowering plant in the family Araceae, native to Borneo. With its V-shaped leaves it is sometimes kept as a houseplant. There are two cultivars, 'Purple Cloak' and 'Candy Sticks'.
