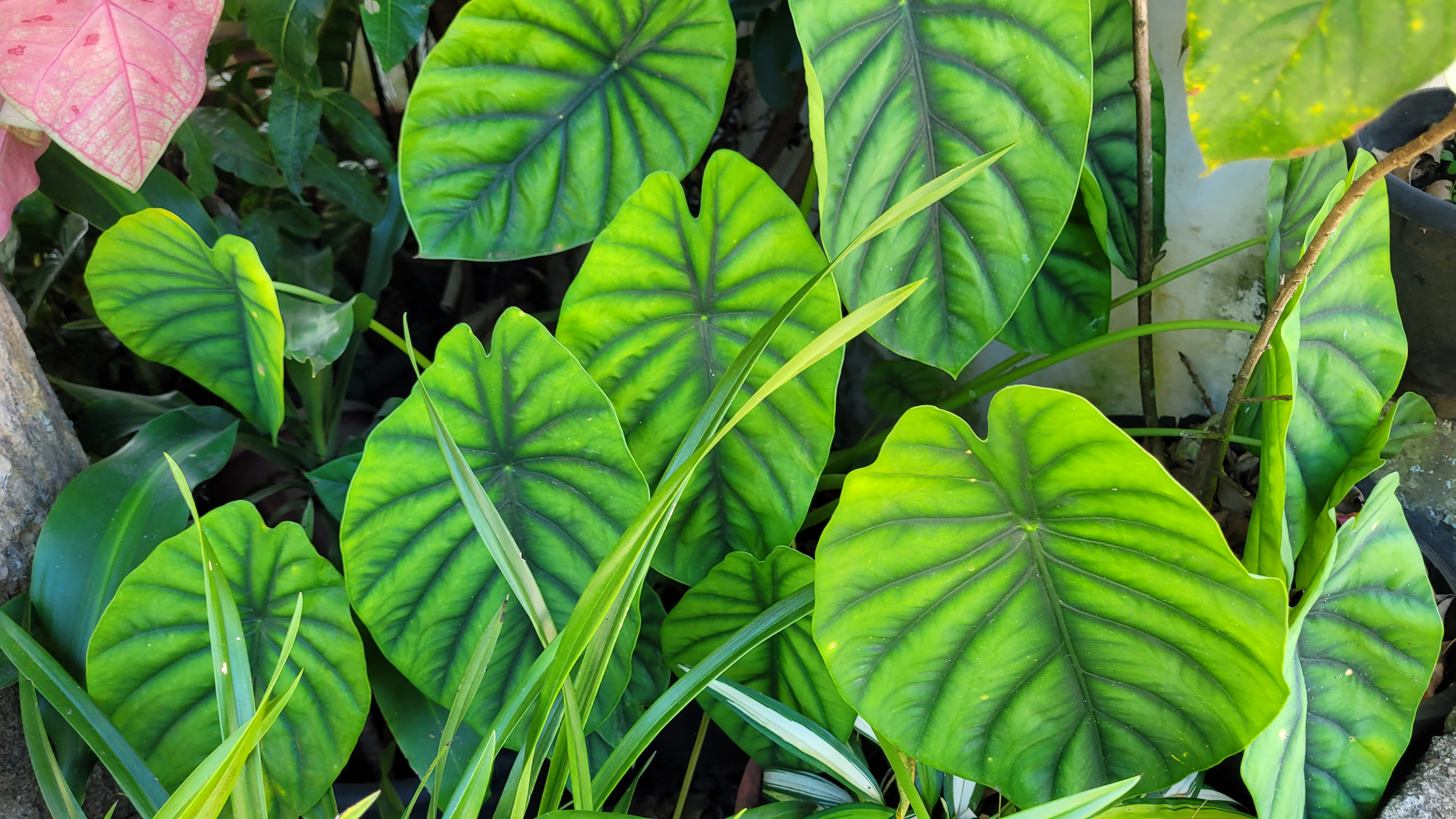

Scientific classification
- Kingdom: Plantae
- Clade: Tracheophytes
- Clade: Angiosperms
- Clade: Monocots
- Order: Alismatales
- Family: Araceae
- Genus: Alocasia
- Species: A. clypeolata

Binomial name
- Alocasia clypeolata A.Hay

= Alocasia clypeolata =

Species of flowering plant

Alocasia clypeolata, commonly known as green shield alocasia, is a species of Alocasia found in the Philippines.
