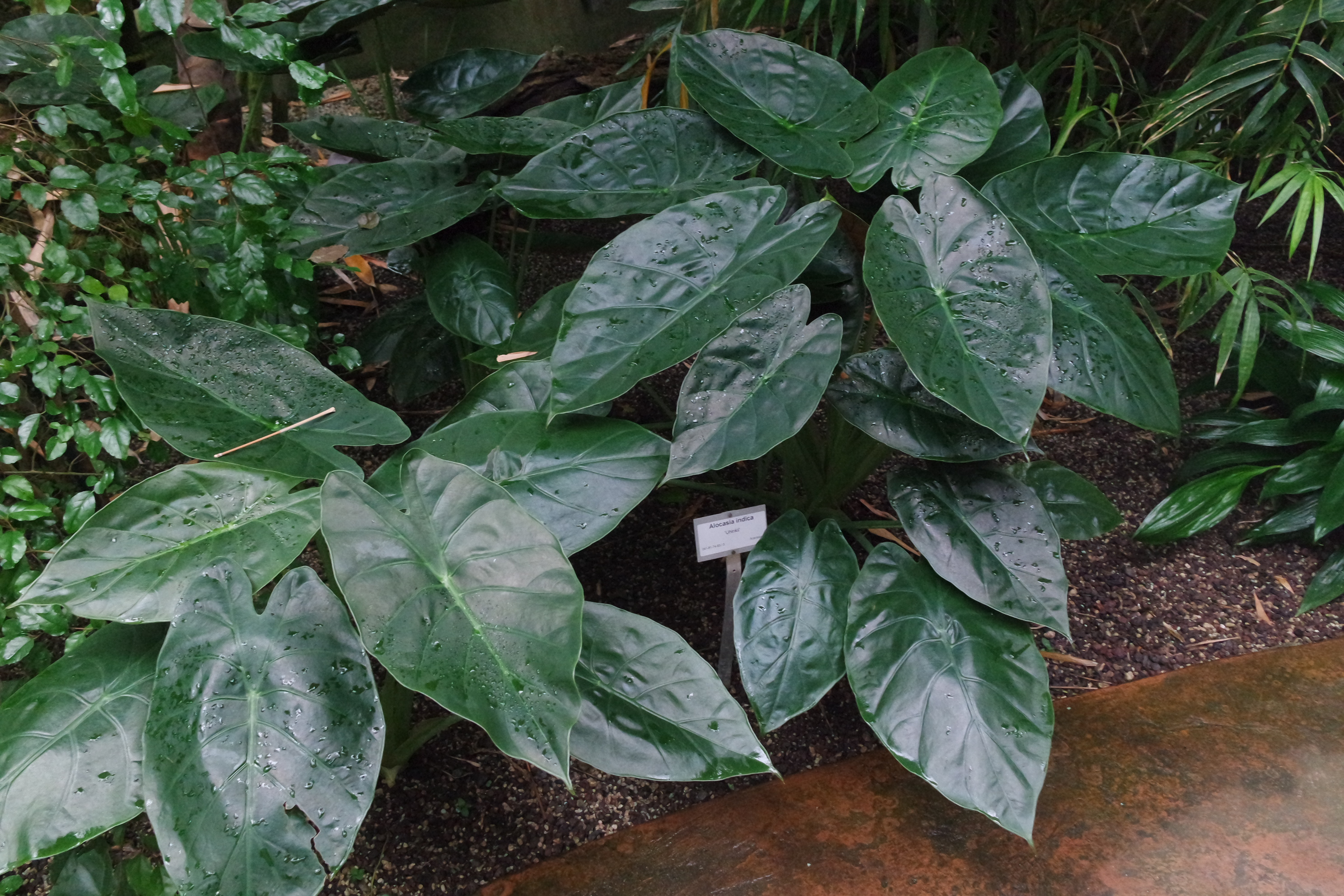

Scientific classification
- Kingdom: Plantae
- Clade: Tracheophytes
- Clade: Angiosperms
- Clade: Monocots
- Order: Alismatales
- Family: Araceae
- Genus: Alocasia
- Species: A. indica

Binomial name
- Alocasia indica (Lour.) Spach (1846)

Synonyms
- Alocasia indica var. typica Engl. (1920); Alocasia indica var. diversifolia Engl. (1920); Alocasia indica var. heterophylla Engl. (1879); Alocasia indica var. metallica (Schott) Schott (1860); Alocasia indica var. rubra (Hassk.) Engl. (1920); Alocasia indica var. variegata (K.Koch & C.D.Bouché) Engl. (1879); Alocasia macrorrhizos var. rubra (Hassk.) Furtado (1941); Alocasia macrorrhizos variegata (K.Koch & C.D.Bouché) Veitch ex J.Dix (1861); Alocasia macrorrhizos var. variegata (K.Koch & C.D.Bouché) B.S.Williams (1870); Alocasia metallica Schott (1854); Alocasia variegata K.Koch & C.D.Bouché (1855); Arum indicum Lour. (1790) (basionym); Colocasia indica (Lour.) Kunth (1841); Colocasia indica var. rubra Hassk. (1840)

= Alocasia indica =

Species of flowering plant

Alocasia indica is a species of flowering plant in the arum family, Araceae. It is a subshrub native to India and Bangladesh, Myanmar, Vietnam, and Java.
