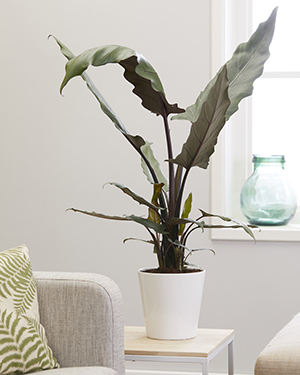
- As a houseplant

Scientific classification
- Kingdom: Plantae
- Clade: Embryophytes
- Clade: Tracheophytes
- Clade: Spermatophytes
- Clade: Angiosperms
- Clade: Monocots
- Order: Alismatales
- Family: Araceae
- Genus: Alocasia
- Species: A. lauterbachiana

Binomial name
- Alocasia lauterbachiana (Engl.) A.Hay

Synonyms
- Alocasia wavriniana Mast.; Schizocasia lauterbachiana Engl.; Xenophya lauterbachiana (Engl.) Nicolson

= Alocasia lauterbachiana =

Species of flowering plant

Alocasia lauterbachiana, the purple sword, silver sword, or baroque sword, is a species of flowering plant in the family Araceae, native to northern New Guinea and the Bismarck Archipelago. With its upward-pointing leaves reaching 1.5 m (5 ft), it is kept as a houseplant and is readily available in commerce.
