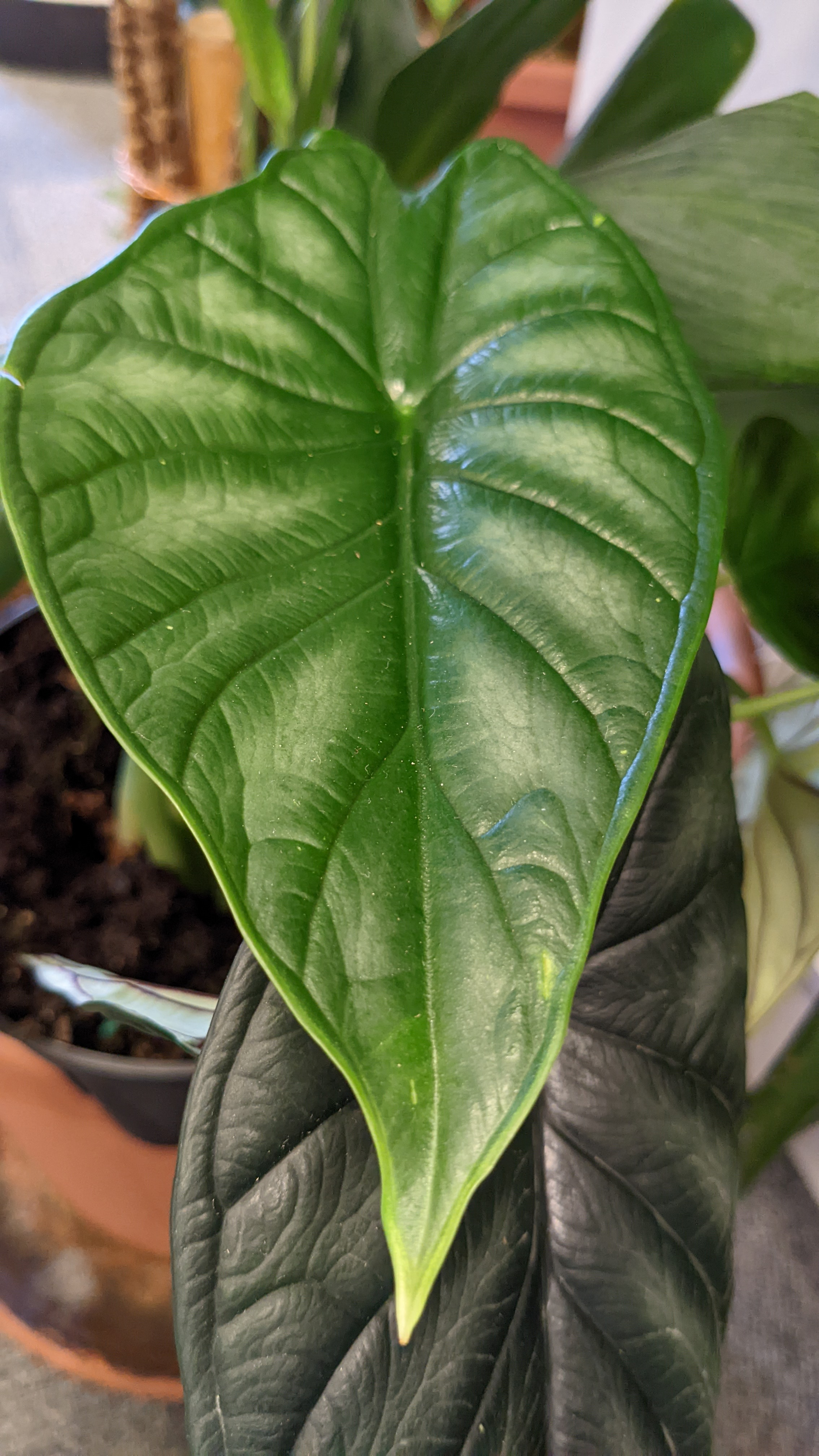
- As a houseplant

Scientific classification
- Kingdom: Plantae
- Clade: Embryophytes
- Clade: Tracheophytes
- Clade: Spermatophytes
- Clade: Angiosperms
- Clade: Monocots
- Order: Alismatales
- Family: Araceae
- Genus: Alocasia
- Species: A. baginda

Binomial name
- Alocasia baginda Kurniawan & P.C.Boyce

= Alocasia baginda =

Species of flowering plant

Alocasia baginda is a species of flowering plant in the family Araceae, native to Kalimantan, Indonesia. As a houseplant it is rare in commerce, with the unimproved species, and the cultivars 'Dragonscale', 'Green Dragon' and 'Silver Dragon'.
