= Alocasia chaii =

Scientific classification
- Kingdom: Plantae
- Clade: Embryophytes
- Clade: Tracheophytes
- Clade: Spermatophytes
- Clade: Angiosperms
- Clade: Monocots
- Order: Alismatales
- Family: Araceae
- Genus: Alocasia
- Species: A. chaii

Binomial name
- Alocasia chaii P.C.Boyce

Species of flowering plant

Alocasia chaii is a species of flowering plant in the family Araceae, native to Sarawak state, Malaysia. Occasionally cultivated for its coriaceous leaves that remain peltate even when mature, it is considered obscure even by Alocasia enthusiasts and is very rarely found in commerce.
