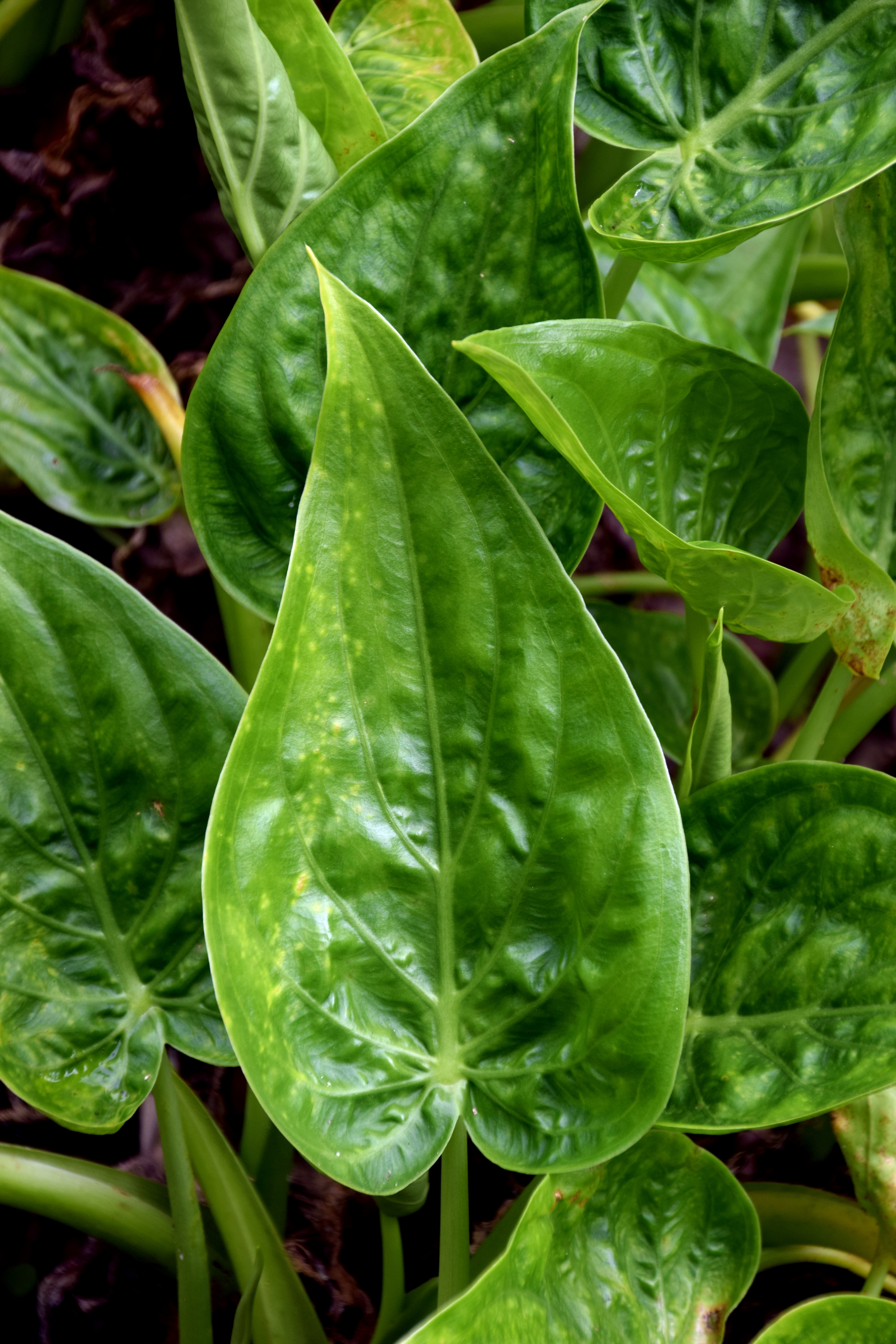
- Alocasia cucullata in Auckland Botanic Gardens

Scientific classification
- Kingdom: Plantae
- Clade: Tracheophytes
- Clade: Angiosperms
- Clade: Monocots
- Order: Alismatales
- Family: Araceae
- Genus: Alocasia
- Species: A. cucullata

Binomial name
- Alocasia cucullata (Lour.) G.Don

Synonyms
- Arum cucullatum Lour.; Caladium cucullatum (Lour.) Pers.; Colocasia cucullata (Lour.) Schott; Alocasia rugosa (Desf.) Schott; Caladium colocasia Schott ex Wight; Caladium rugosum Desf.; Colocasia cochleata Miq.; Colocasia rugosa (Desf.) Kunth; Panzhuyuia omeiensis Z.Y.Zhu

= Alocasia cucullata =

Species of flowering plant

Alocasia cucullata is a species of flowering plant in the arum family, Araceae. It is known by the common names Chinese taro, Chinese ape, Buddha's hand, and hooded dwarf elephant ear. It is kept as an ornamental plant.

The native range of the species is unclear, as it is known only from cultivation and from specimens growing around human habitation and in disturbed areas. It is grown in many parts of Asia, such as China, India, Sri Lanka, and Burma.

== Description ==
This aroid plant is a perennial herb producing thick, erect stems up to 6 centimeters wide that branch from the bases and grow up to a meter tall. It produces bunches of leaves on long, sheathed petioles which are generally up to about 30 centimeters long but are known to reach 80. The wide, roughly heart-shaped leaf blade is up to 40 by 28 centimeters and has 4 main veins running from the center to the edge on each side. The plant rarely flowers. When it develops, the inflorescence may be solitary or paired. It arises on a peduncle 20 to 30 centimeters long and is wrapped in a green to blue-green spathe. The yellowish or bluish-green spadix is up to 14 centimeters long. Fruiting is also rare, but the plant may produce red berries each 6 to 8 millimeters wide.

== Biology ==
The flowers are pollinated by the drosophilid flies Colocasiomyia alocasiae and C. xenalocasiae, at least in Japan.

The plant easily reproduces vegetatively sprouting up when pieces of stem or root enter the soil.

It is susceptible to bacterial leaf spot disease caused by Pantoea agglomerans.

This species has been introduced to many regions, including much of the Pacific, where it can be found in Hawaii, Micronesia, Fiji, French Polynesia, and Guam. It has also been introduced to parts of Central America.

== Human uses ==
It has some uses in traditional Chinese medicine. It is applied externally to treat snakebite, abscesses, rheumatism, and arthritis. It is poisonous due to the presence of calcium oxalate crystals.

This plant is considered to bring good luck, so it is kept at Buddhist temples in Laos and Thailand.
