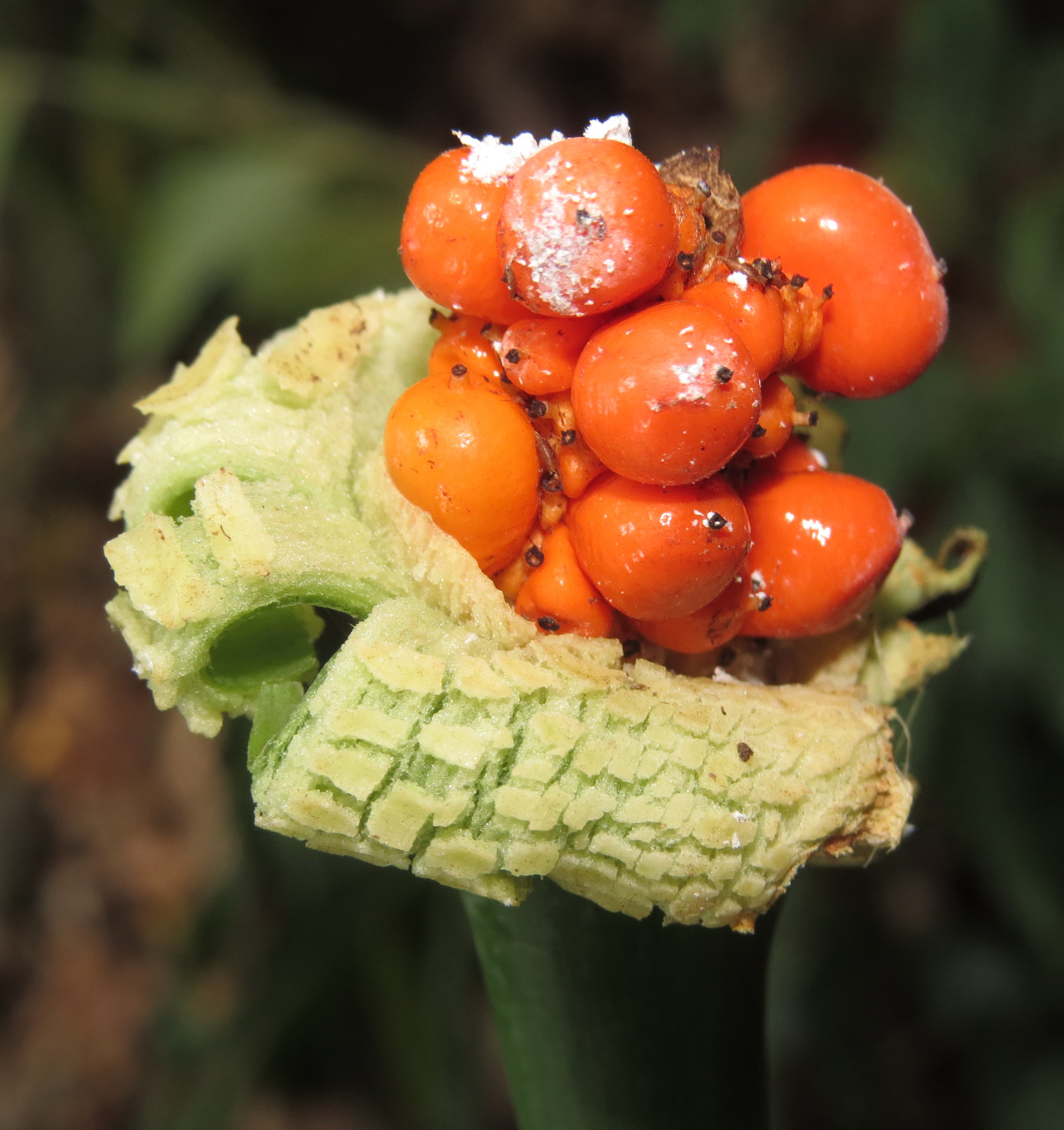

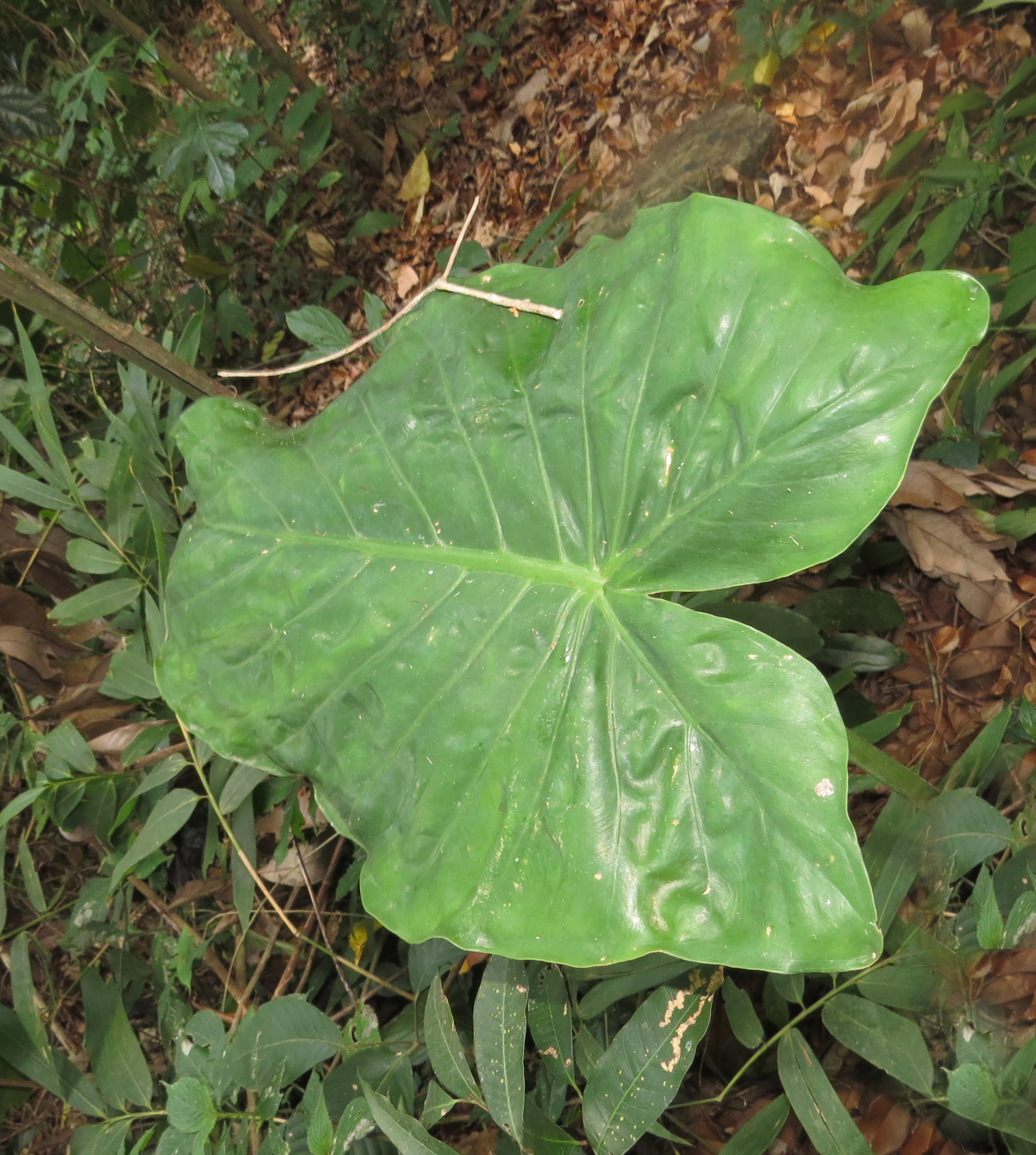

Scientific classification
- Kingdom: Plantae
- Clade: Tracheophytes
- Clade: Angiosperms
- Clade: Monocots
- Order: Alismatales
- Family: Araceae
- Genus: Alocasia
- Species: A. fornicata

Binomial name
- Alocasia fornicata (Kunth) Schott

Synonyms
- Colocasia fornicata Kunth

= Alocasia fornicata =

Species of flowering plant

Alocasia fornicata is a plant species of many-nerved, broad-leaved, rhizomatous or tuberous perennials from the family Araceae, native to Indochina and to the Indian subcontinent. It characteristically grows 2' - 3 ' in height with slightly pink petiole, triangular wide shaped leaves and a horizontally growing stolon.

The plant's spadix is collected and cooked in North East Indian states of Mizoram, Manipur and Tripura where the plant is known locally as Baibing in Mizo. Alocasia affinis is also consumed. Both are a much favored seasonal vegetable.

The plant, including the spadix, contains needle-shaped crystals of calcium oxalate known as raphides that are believed to be a defense mechanism against plant predators that can tear and damage the mucous membranes of the throat or esophagus.
