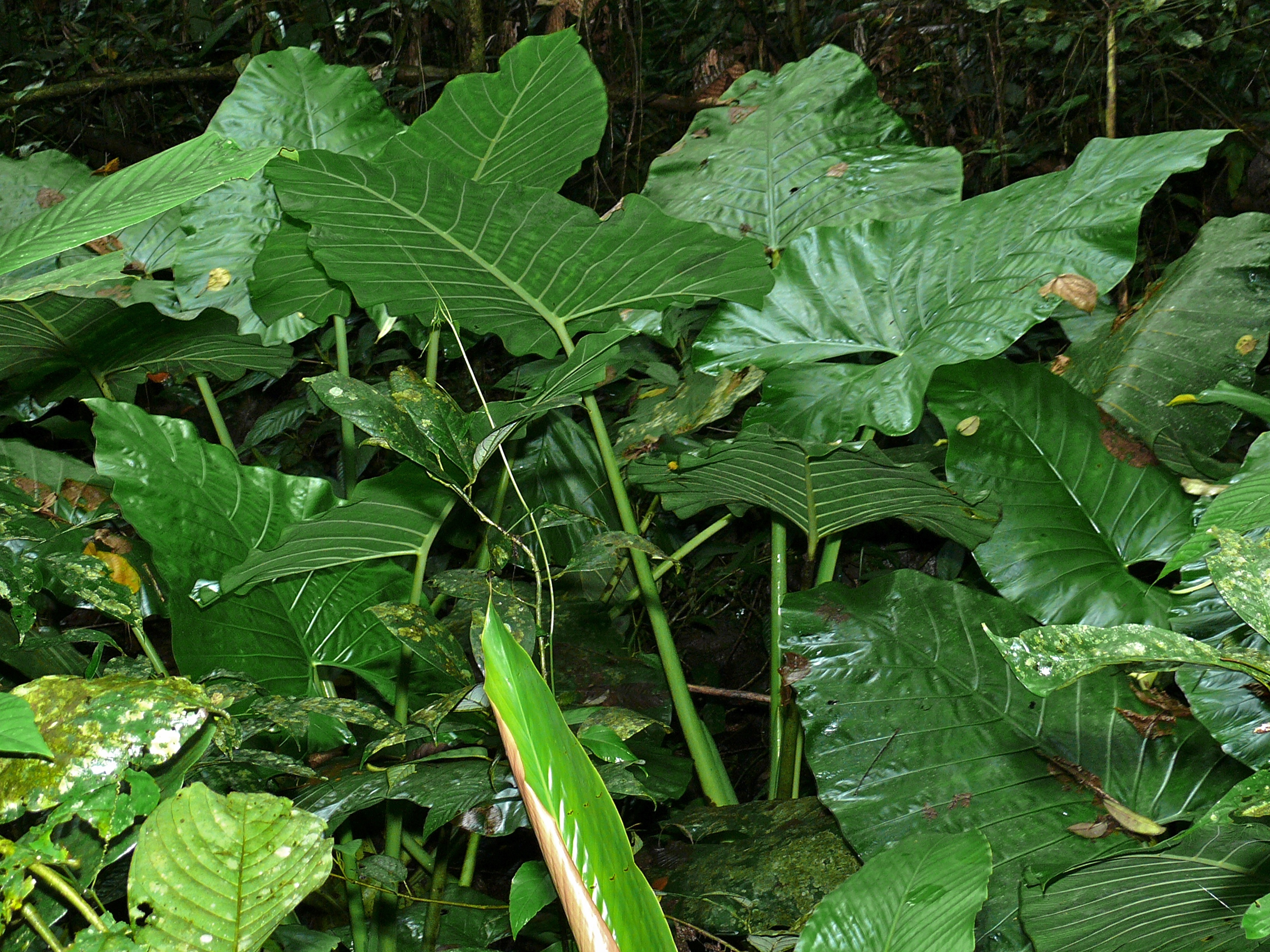
- In Gunung Mulu National Park
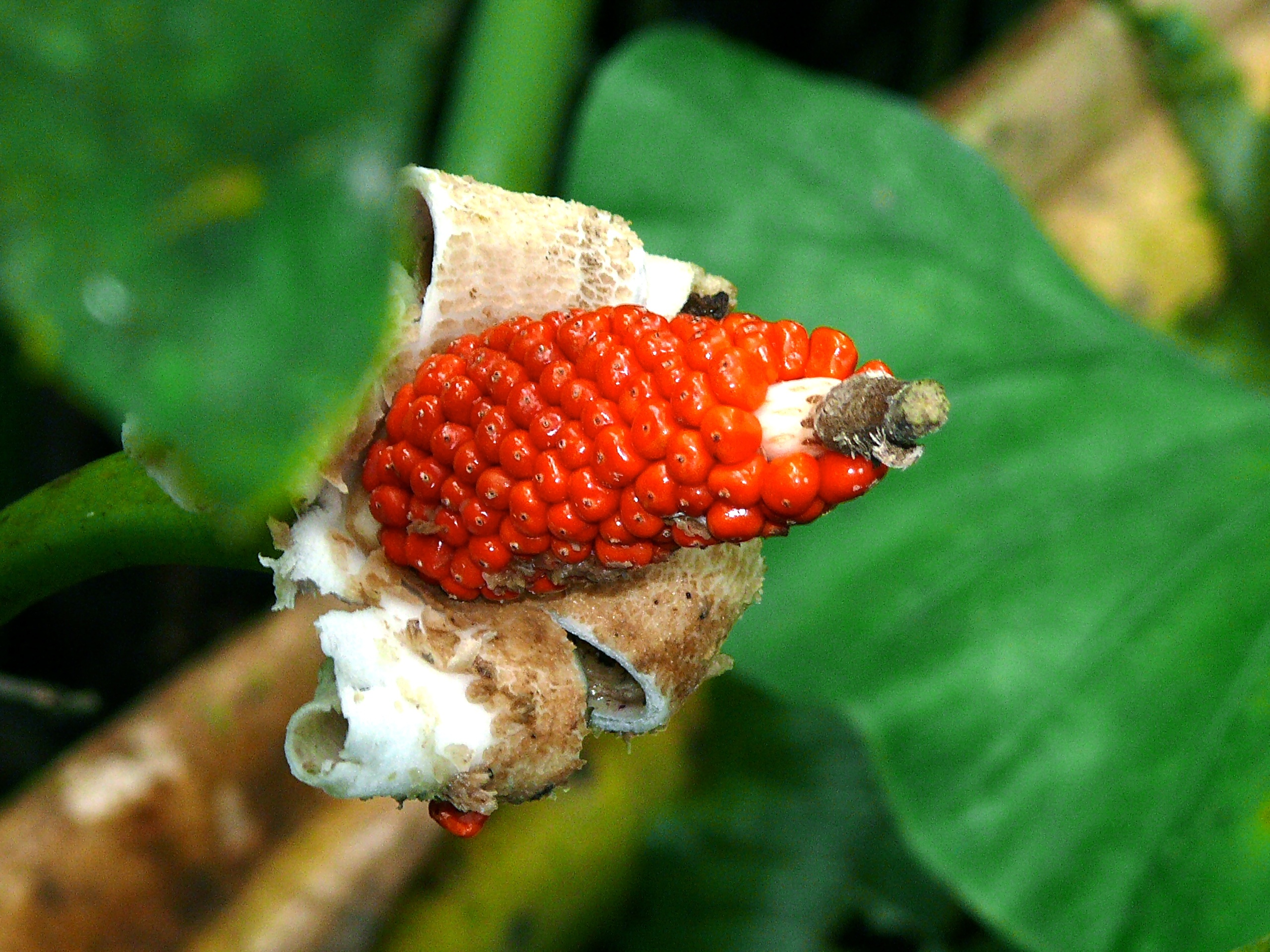
- Fruit

Scientific classification
- Kingdom: Plantae
- Clade: Embryophytes
- Clade: Tracheophytes
- Clade: Spermatophytes
- Clade: Angiosperms
- Clade: Monocots
- Order: Alismatales
- Family: Araceae
- Genus: Alocasia
- Species: A. sarawakensis

Binomial name
- Alocasia sarawakensis M.Hotta

= Alocasia sarawakensis =

Species of flowering plant

Alocasia sarawakensis is a species of flowering plant in the elephant ear genus Alocasia (family Araceae), native to Borneo. Unusually for an aroid, it is a freshwater swamp forest obligate, preferring well-lit situations. A large species, it can reach 8 ft (2.4 m). A cultivar, 'Yucatan Princess', is commercially available.

Alocasia sarawakensis can be difficult for home gardeners in Europe or North America to grow; it will not tolerate extended periods of temperatures below 50°F. During its growing season, moderate watering paired with weekly feeding are required for Alocasia sarawakensis to thrive.
