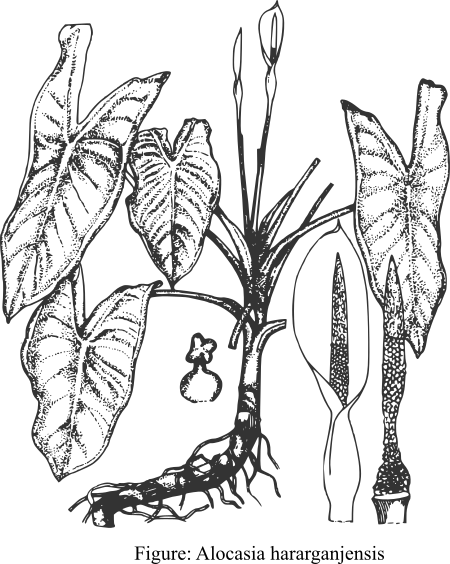
- Botanical illustration

Scientific classification
- Kingdom: Plantae
- Clade: Tracheophytes
- Clade: Angiosperms
- Clade: Monocots
- Order: Alismatales
- Family: Araceae
- Genus: Alocasia
- Species: A. hararganjensis

Binomial name
- Alocasia hararganjensis H. Ara & M.A. Hassan

= Alocasia hararganjensis =

Species of plant

Alocasia hararganjensis is a pachycaul herb and flowering plant species in the Araceae family. It is closely related to Alocasia fallax but can be easily distinguished by the shape of the leaves.

== Taxonomy and etymology ==
Bangladeshi botanists Hosne Ara and Muhammad Abul Hasan discovered it. It is found in the Haraganj reserve forest of Lawachara in Moulvibazar. That is why the plant is named after that forest.
