= Alocasia robusta =

Scientific classification
- Kingdom: Plantae
- Clade: Tracheophytes
- Clade: Angiosperms
- Clade: Monocots
- Order: Alismatales
- Family: Araceae
- Genus: Alocasia
- Species: A. robusta

Binomial name
- Alocasia robusta M. Hotta

Species of flowering plant

Alocasia robusta is a gigantic herb in the arum family (Araceae) which is endemic to the island of Borneo. The plant is a rosette herb consisting of several very large leaves having a sagittate (arrowhead shaped) lamina or blade up to 6 m (20 ft) long by nearly 3 m (9.8 ft) wide, borne on very stout petioles or stalks up to 3.7 m (12 ft) in length. The inflorescence is the spathe and spadix typical of the Arum family, with the spathe being a very dark blackish-purple color. This species was unknown to science prior to 1967. The plant is usually trunkless.
