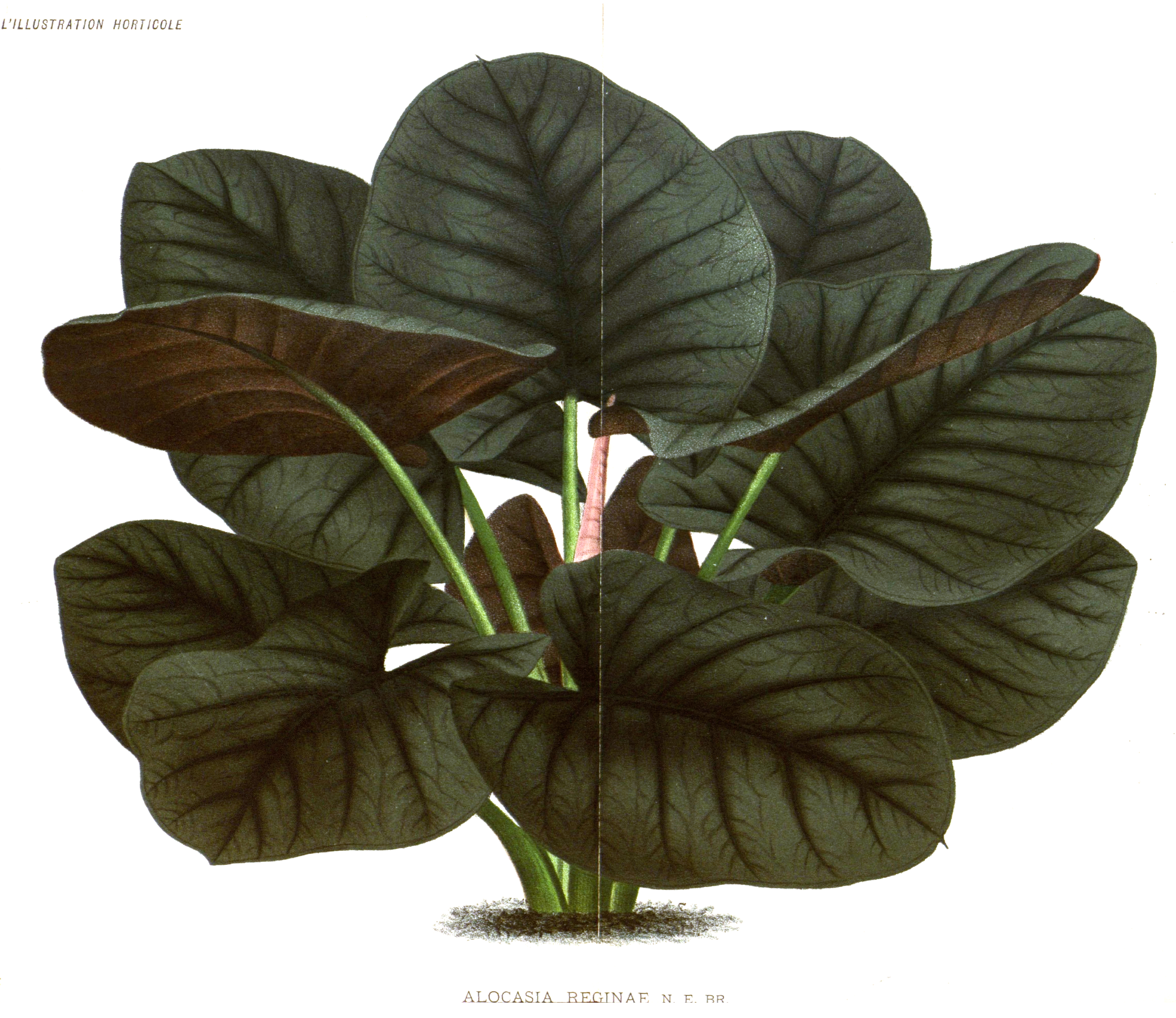
- Horticultural illustration

Scientific classification
- Kingdom: Plantae
- Clade: Embryophytes
- Clade: Tracheophytes
- Clade: Spermatophytes
- Clade: Angiosperms
- Clade: Monocots
- Order: Alismatales
- Family: Araceae
- Genus: Alocasia
- Species: A. reginae

Binomial name
- Alocasia reginae N.E.Br.

= Alocasia reginae =

Species of flowering plant

Alocasia reginae is a species of flowering plant in the family Araceae, native to Borneo. Occasionally kept as a houseplant, there are cultivars available, including 'Miri' and 'Elaine'.
