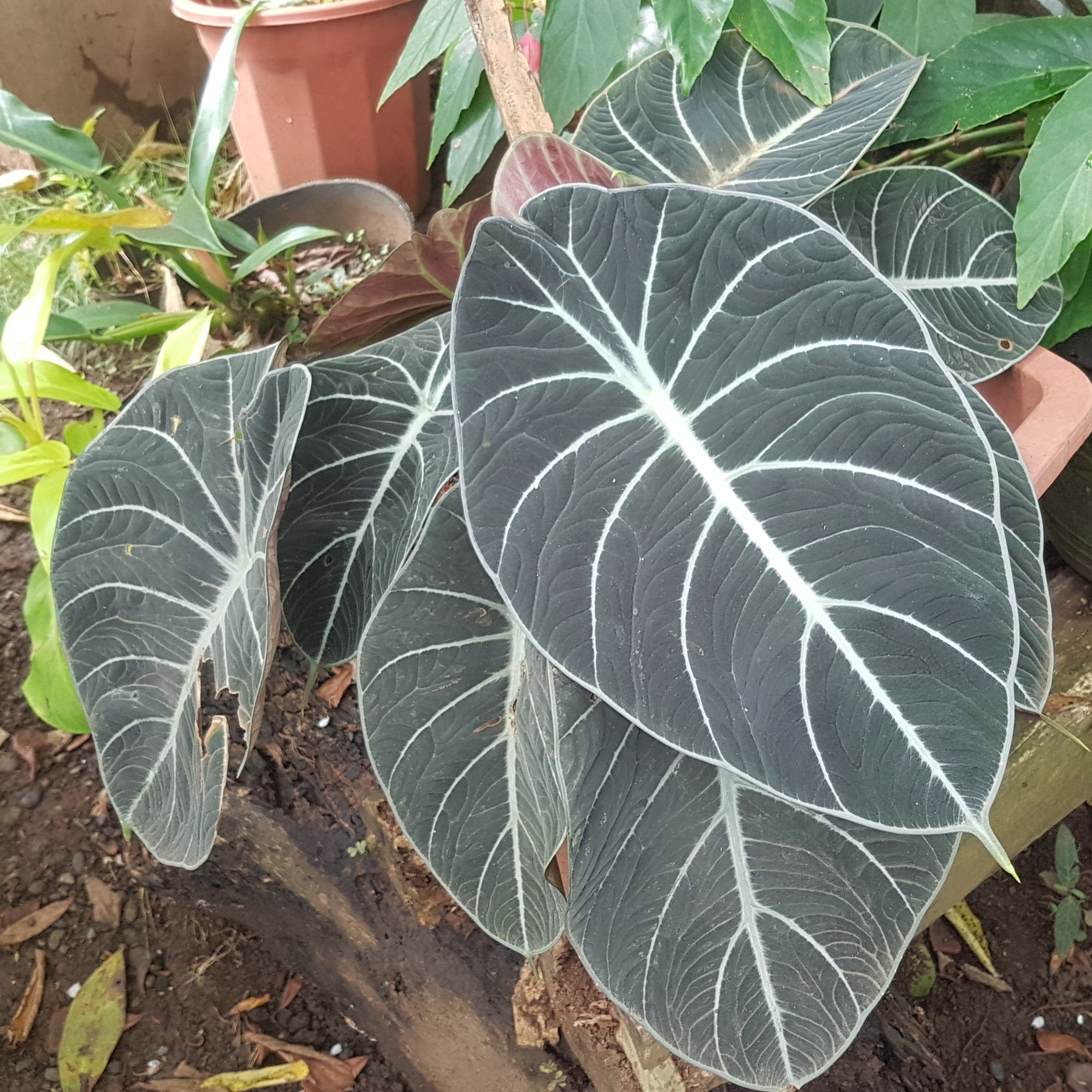
- Leaves

Scientific classification
- Kingdom: Plantae
- Clade: Embryophytes
- Clade: Tracheophytes
- Clade: Spermatophytes
- Clade: Angiosperms
- Clade: Monocots
- Order: Alismatales
- Family: Araceae
- Genus: Alocasia
- Species: A. reginula

Binomial name
- Alocasia reginula A.Hay

= Alocasia reginula =

Species of flowering plant

Alocasia reginula, black velvet, is a species of flowering cormous aroid (family Araceae), native to Sabah state in Malaysia. This plant, often referred to as one of the "jewel" Alocasias (along with several other diminutive Alocasia types), became increasingly popular among plant hobbyists between the years 2018 to 2020. Until as recently as 2021 though, not much was known about the plant or its origins. Originally described from cultivation, and often sold as "Alocasia 'Black Velvet'", it is not a modern cultivar or hybrid; A. reginula is its own natural species. It is only known from dry, deeply shaded limestone cliffs in Tabin Wildlife Reserve. As a houseplant it needs sharp drainage or it will very likely rot.

Many plant vendors and stores sell houseplants in far too thick and dense of potting media. A beneficial practice is to simply remove the plant, briefly, to amend the substrate and add more porosity and drainage. Some examples of acceptable substrate amendments for Alocasia (of all types) include perlite, pumice, small to medium orchid bark, coconut coir, coconut chips, sphagnum moss, LECA, or a combination of some or all. Alternatively, many growers report successful, thriving growth when the corms are planted in pure sphagnum moss.

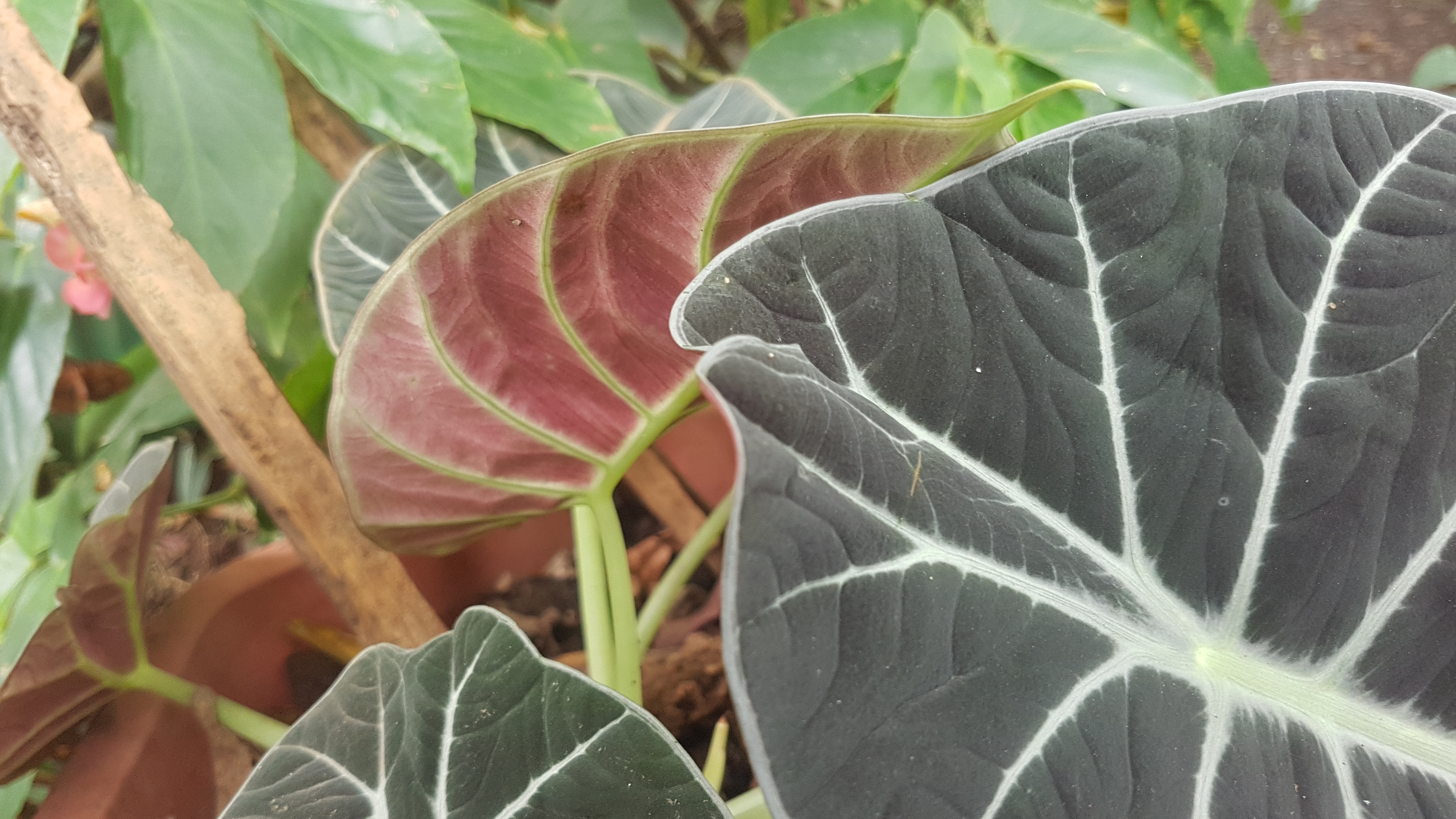
Undersides of leaves are reddish.

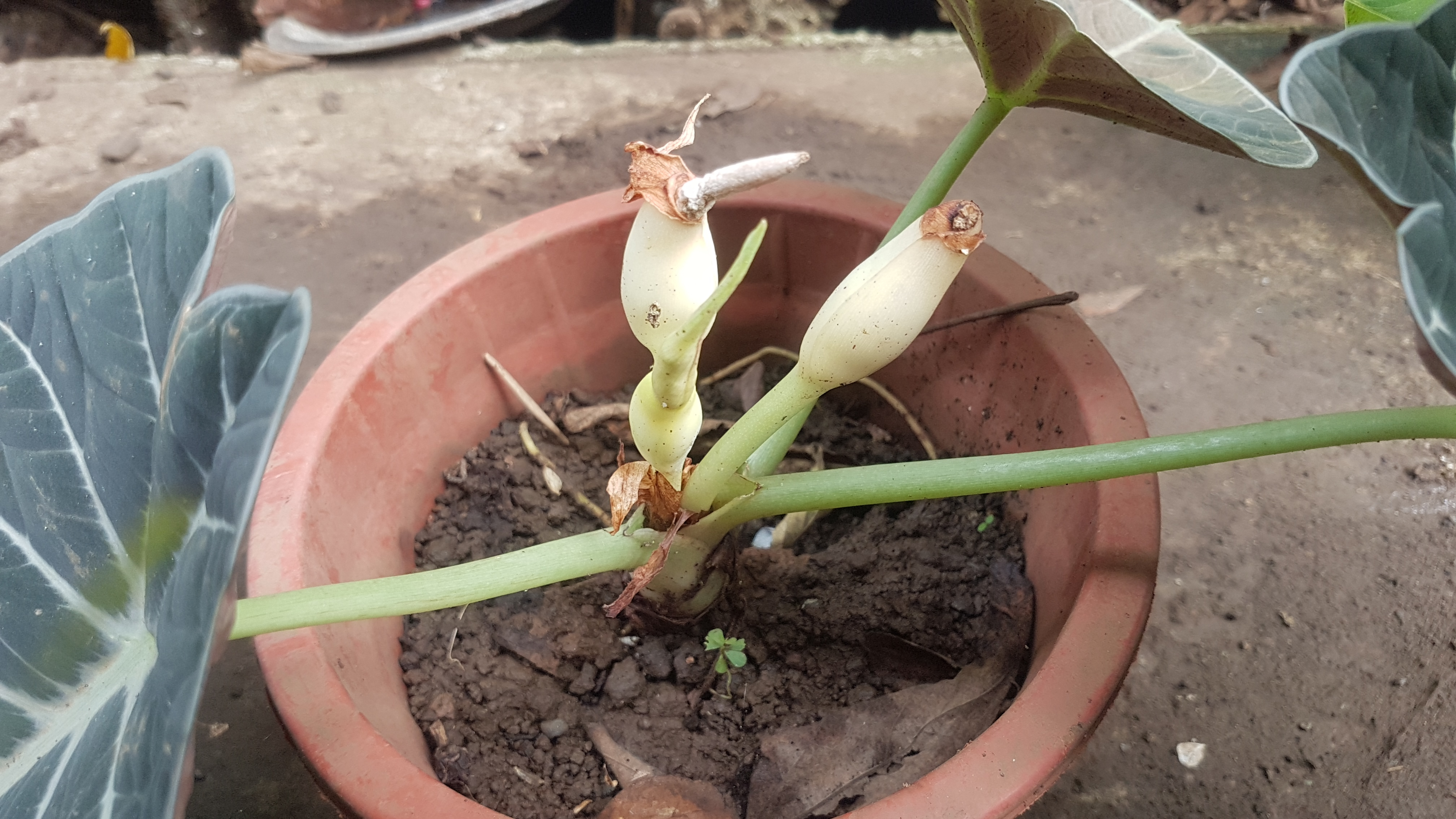
Inflorescences are inconspicuous.
