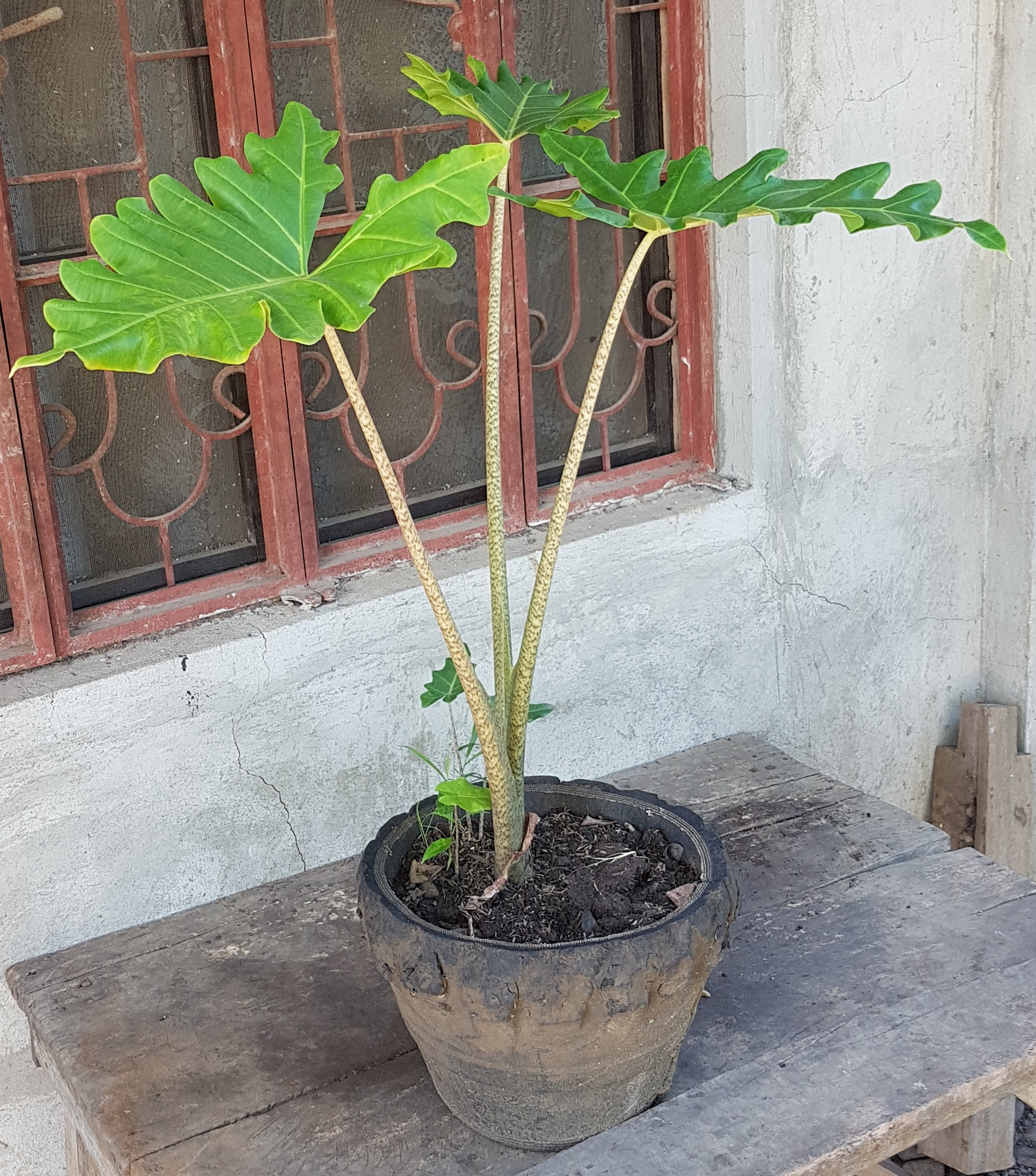
- A young cultivated specimen

Scientific classification
- Kingdom: Plantae
- Clade: Embryophytes
- Clade: Tracheophytes
- Clade: Spermatophytes
- Clade: Angiosperms
- Clade: Monocots
- Order: Alismatales
- Family: Araceae
- Genus: Alocasia
- Species: A. portei

Binomial name
- Alocasia portei Schott

Synonyms
- Schizocasia portei (Schott) Engl.; Schizocasia regnieri L.Linden & Rodigas

= Alocasia portei =

Species of flowering plant

Alocasia portei is a species of flowering plant in the family Araceae, native to Luzon in the Philippines. With Alocasia odora it is the pollen parent of the large landscaping plant Alocasia × portora.

== Description ==
Alocasia portei is a massive, thick-stemmed plant with a base that thickens even more with age. It can reach a height of 6 metres (20 feet) and sometimes 10 m (33 ft) in ideal environments. It is an evergreen that grows best in tropical forests. Mature plants have a leathery texture.

=== Foliage ===
The leaves of Alocasia portei typically grow only one on each stem. They can be 1.5 m (5 ft) or longer. Leaves are dark green, and the veins are lighter and stand out. The petioles are dark brown.

=== Flowers ===
Inflorescences grow from the center of the crown of leaves, on stalks up to 30 centimetres (12 inches) in length. The spaths are longer than the spadixes and measure up to 40 cm (16 in) long and are green or dark brownish-green.

Spadixes are put into two groups – the male zone and the female zone. Male zone spadixes are about 8 cm (3.1 in) long and are white-ish, while female zone spadixes are about 4 cm (1.6 in) long and white.

=== Fruit ===
The fruits of Alocasia portei are oval and grow all over a stalk of about 10 cm (4 in) long. There is limited information about the colour of the fruit of Alocasia portei.

== Ornamental uses ==
Alocasia portei is valued as an ornamental plant in homes due to its striking leaf shape uncommon in other Alocasia species, which have heart or arrow-shaped leaves.
