= Alocasia melo =

Scientific classification
- Kingdom: Plantae
- Clade: Embryophytes
- Clade: Tracheophytes
- Clade: Spermatophytes
- Clade: Angiosperms
- Clade: Monocots
- Order: Alismatales
- Family: Araceae
- Genus: Alocasia
- Species: A. melo

Binomial name
- Alocasia melo A.Hay, P.C.Boyce & K.M.Wong

Species of flowering plant

Alocasia melo is a species of flowering plant in the family Araceae, native to Sabah state in Malaysia. It grows on ultramafic soils. In the houseplant trade it is often sold as "Alocasia rugosa" due to its highly rugose leaves.

== Etymology ==
The name 'melo' in the specific epithet is derived from the leaves, which are thick, nearly circular, and have a bumpy and wrinkled texture similar to the skin of a cantaloupe melon.

== Description ==
This small herb reaches a height of about 25–35 centimetres (10–14 in). The stem is short and erect, measuring up to 3 cm (1 in) in diameter. The leaves grow in groups of about four, with their bases overlapping. The petiole, which is pale green and smooth, is about 14–19 cm (6–7 in) long and has sparse burgundy spots in the lower portion. The sheath wings are somewhat broad and triangular. The leaf blade is very broad, ranging from ovate to nearly circular, measuring 18–25 cm (7–10 in) in length and 15 cm (6 in) in width. It has a wrinkled and bumpy texture and a deep bluish-green color on the upper surface, while the lower surface is smooth and pale greenish-white. The leaves are leathery and peltate, with the attachment point in the center. The anterior lobe of the leaf is about 12.5–16 cm (5–6 in) long, with a broadly acute or obtuse tip that then tapers shortly for about 1 cm (0.4 in) and may be slightly pointed. The posterior lobes are up to 8.5 cm (3 in) long and are fused for 75–90% of their length. The posterior veins diverge from each other at an angle of approximately 20–30 degrees and are poorly developed, similar in size to the primary veins that arise from the anterior vein. There are three or four primary lateral veins on each side of the anterior vein, which diverge at angles ranging from 90 to 45 degrees. These veins are deeply impressed on the upper surface and more or less flush with the leaf surface on the lower side, appearing dark green. They irregularly bear veins that are intermediate in thickness between the primary and secondary veins, following the same path as the latter. The secondary veins are deeply impressed on the upper side and somewhat raised and similar in color to the lower surface, arising at a wide angle of about 80 degrees from the primary veins and forming distinct intercostal collective veins. The tertiary veins are prominently raised on the upper surface, forming an irregular honeycomb pattern, while they are not visible on the lower surface.

== Distribution ==
Endemic to Sabah, Malaysian Borneo. This species joins a growing list of rare and endemic plants peculiar to the ultramafic substrate in Sabah.
