= Alocasia infernalis =

Scientific classification
- Kingdom: Plantae
- Clade: Embryophytes
- Clade: Tracheophytes
- Clade: Spermatophytes
- Clade: Angiosperms
- Clade: Monocots
- Order: Alismatales
- Family: Araceae
- Genus: Alocasia
- Species: A. infernalis

Binomial name
- Alocasia infernalis P.C.Boyce

Species of flowering plant

Alocasia infernalis is a species of flowering plant in the arum family, Araceae.

== Taxonomy ==
Alocasia infernalis was described by Peter C. Boyce in 2007 based upon a holotype specimen collected in 1998 near Batang Baleh, a tributary of the Rejang River. Based upon flower anatomy and the pubescent petioles, Boyce diagnosed it as belonging to the Alocasia scabriscula species group; however, its leaf and fruit anatomy are sufficiently unique that it is not yet clear to which other species in the group Alocasia infernalis is most closely related.

The specific epithet references the dark leaves of mature plants, which can exhibit a baleful red iridescence depending on lighting and viewing angle, and was inspired by the scientific name of the vampire squid (Vampyroteuthis infernalis).

== Description ==
This species is a small, robust perennial herbaceous plant with a slender stem, reaching up to 55 cm (22 in) in height. Seedlings and young plants have an erect growth habit, while older plants tend to droop. Leaves are very deep purple to purple-red and glossy on top. Seedlings and juveniles have metallic-purple leaves, while the leaves of mature plants are a lustrous, deep purple-black. The petioles are about 20 cm long and have a bronze-green to purple-green coloration with prominent veins.

Two paired flowers, pale green or tinged purple, are borne together, with a short, broad prophyll and a single cataphyll. The fruits of Alocasia infernalis are small, spherical berries, 0.5 cm in diameter, which are bright orange to red when mature. Each berry has 1 to 3 seeds, which are medium brown with a flattish oval shape.

== Distribution ==
It is native to the Kapit Division in Sarawak, Malaysia, and thus far is known only from scattered populations in the watershed of the Sungai Gaat river.

== Habitat and ecology ==
It is found in moist to ever-wet lowland forests of valley bottoms, where it grows in red sandstone-derived clay-loam substrates with deep leaf litter cover and heavy shade.

== Status and conservation ==
Alocasia infernalis's conservation status has not yet been formally assessed. Its habitat being restricted to remote, inaccessible locales likely provides some protection from poaching for the houseplant trade. This species was also one of fifteen Sarawakian Alocasia species selected for a joint tissue culture project between a private company, Malesiana Tropicals, and a public university, Universiti Malaysia Sarawak, and is being tissue cultured under license from the Sarawak Forestry Department.

== Cultivation ==
Alocasia infernalis is occasionally kept as a houseplant, and a cultivar named 'Viery' has been developed.
