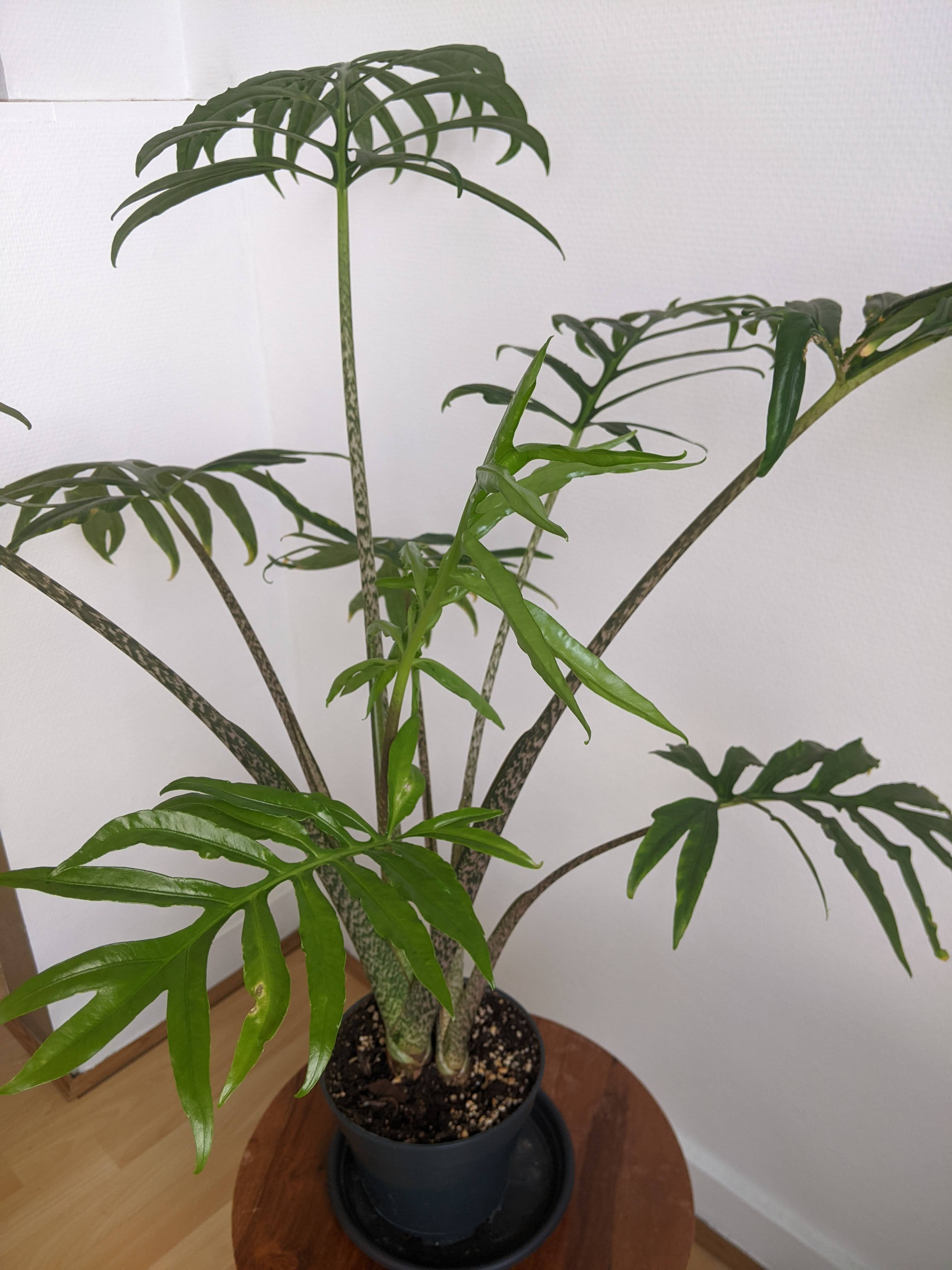

Scientific classification
- Kingdom: Plantae
- Clade: Embryophytes
- Clade: Tracheophytes
- Clade: Spermatophytes
- Clade: Angiosperms
- Clade: Monocots
- Order: Alismatales
- Family: Araceae
- Genus: Alocasia
- Species: A. brancifolia

Binomial name
- Alocasia brancifolia (Schott) A.Hay

Synonyms
- Alocasia acuta (Engl.) Hallier f.; Schizocasia acuta Engl.; Xenophya brancifolia Schott

= Alocasia brancifolia =

Species of flowering plant

Alocasia brancifolia is a species of flowering plant in the family Araceae, native to the Moluccas and New Guinea. With its heavily dissected leaves it is sometimes kept as a houseplant. There appears to be a cultivar, 'Pink Passion', in which the markings on the petioles are pink instead of the usual brown.

Similar to Alocasia zebrina, the leaf stalks of Alocasia brancifolia are striped.

== Taxonomy and etymology ==
Alocasia brancifolia is named after the branching structure of its dissected leaves which is unique when compared to the leaves of the other species within the Alocasia genus.
