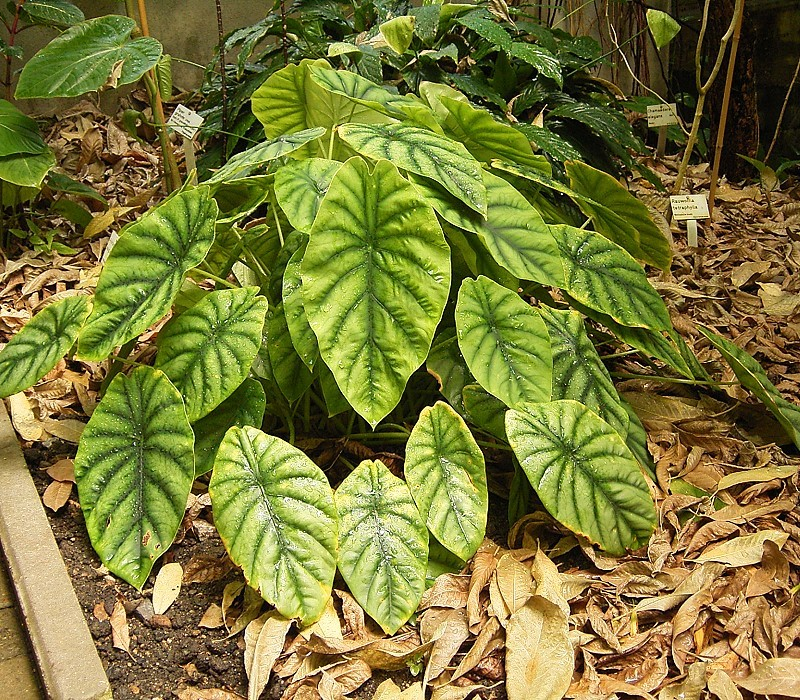

Scientific classification
- Kingdom: Plantae
- Clade: Tracheophytes
- Clade: Angiosperms
- Clade: Monocots
- Order: Alismatales
- Family: Araceae
- Genus: Alocasia
- Species: A. augustiana

Binomial name
- Alocasia augustiana L.Linden & Rodigas, 1886

= Alocasia augustiana =

Species of flowering plant

Alocasia augustiana, is a species of Alocasia found in New Guinea.
