= Alocasia azlanii =

Scientific classification
- Kingdom: Plantae
- Clade: Tracheophytes
- Clade: Angiosperms
- Clade: Monocots
- Order: Alismatales
- Family: Araceae
- Genus: Alocasia
- Species: A. azlanii

Binomial name
- Alocasia azlanii K.M.Wong & P.C.Boyce

Species of flowering plant

Alocasia azlanii, the red mambo, is a perennial species of flowering plant in the family Araceae, native to Brunei, and first described in 2016. With its red to purple patterning on and near its leaf veins, it is sometimes kept as a houseplant.

== Description ==
It grows to around 28cm with a spread ranging between 10-50cm.

== Cultivation ==
The red mambo grows well in bright, indirect sunlight, well-drained soil. It also has a high humidity requirement of 60% and above, and fortnightly watering (if the soil is dry), and a temperature range of 18-24C.
