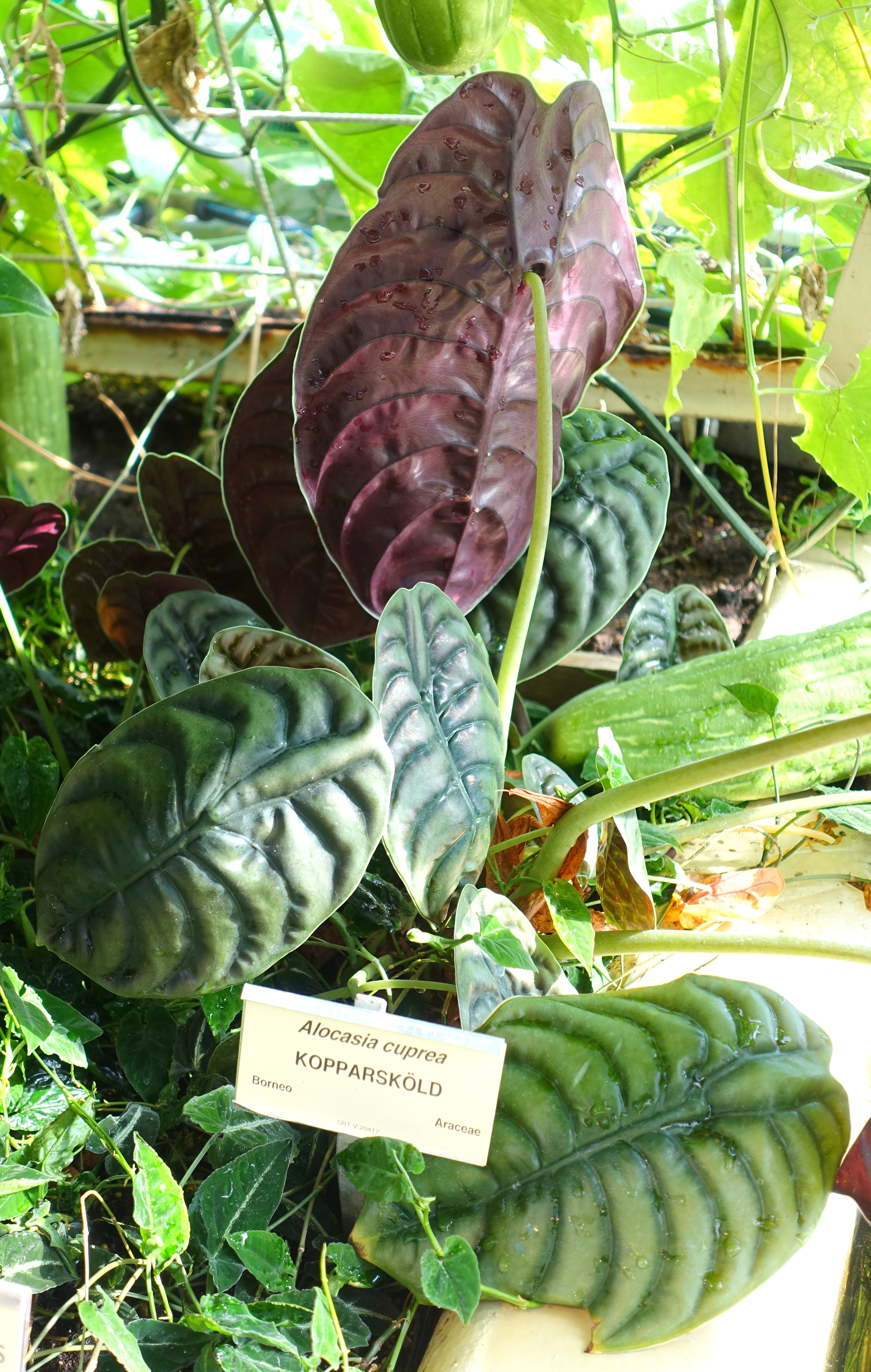
- A. cuprea at Bergianska trädgården

Scientific classification
- Kingdom: Plantae
- Clade: Tracheophytes
- Clade: Angiosperms
- Clade: Monocots
- Order: Alismatales
- Family: Araceae
- Genus: Alocasia
- Species: A. cuprea

Binomial name
- Alocasia cuprea (K.Koch & C.D.Bouché) K.Koch

Synonyms
- Caladium cupreum K.Koch & C.D.Bouché; Gonatanthus cupreus (K.Koch & C.D.Bouché) H.Low ex Sankey; Alocasia metallica (K.Koch) Hook.; Caladium metallicum K.Koch; Caladium veitchii Hend. ex Hook.f.

= Alocasia cuprea =

Species of flowering plant

Alocasia cuprea is a species of plant in the genus Alocasia native to Borneo. This species derives its name, cuprea, from the unusual coppery appearance of the leaves, which are up to 60 cm (24 inches) long. This color is especially pronounced on juvenile leaves, and the back of the leaf is a deep purple, but there is also a greener leaf form of the plant. While rare in cultivation, A. cuprea has been known outside its native habitat since it was brought to Europe in the 1850s by Thomas Lobb for Veitch Nurseries.
