= Englerarum =

Scientific classification
- Kingdom: Plantae
- Clade: Tracheophytes
- Clade: Angiosperms
- Clade: Monocots
- Order: Alismatales
- Family: Araceae
- Genus: Englerarum; Nauheimer & P.C.Boyce
- Species: E. montanum

Binomial name
- Englerarum montanum (Roxb.) P.C.Boyce, K.Z.Hein & A.Hay

Synonyms
- Alocasia gageana Engl. & K.Krause; Alocasia hypnosa J.T.Yin, Y.H.Wang & Z.F.Xu; Alocasia lihengiae C.L.Long & Q.Fang; Alocasia montana (Roxb.) Schott; Arum montanum Roxb. (basionym); Colocasia montana (Roxb.) Kunth; Englerarum hypnosum (J.T.Yin, Y.H.Wang & Z.F.Xu) Nauheimer & P.C.Boyce

Genus of flowering plants

Englerarum montanum (syn. Alocasia gageana), the dwarf upright elephant ear or dwarf taro, is a species of flowering plant in the family Araceae. The sole member of its genus, Englerarum, it is a perennial native to Laos, Thailand, the Kachin Hills of Myanmar, and southwestern Yunnan in south-central China.

Reaching 4 ft (1 m), it is only a dwarf when compared to the giant upright elephant ear Alocasia odora or to taro (Colocasia esculenta). It makes for a large houseplant, or an outdoor ornamental plant in tropical or (nearly) frost-free subtropical areas (USDA zone 9b or warmer).

== Hybrids ==
With Alocasia odora it is a parent of the so-called Persian palm, Alocasia 'Calidora', which would be better called Alocasia × calidora.

Alocasia 'Calidora' (Alocasia × calidora)

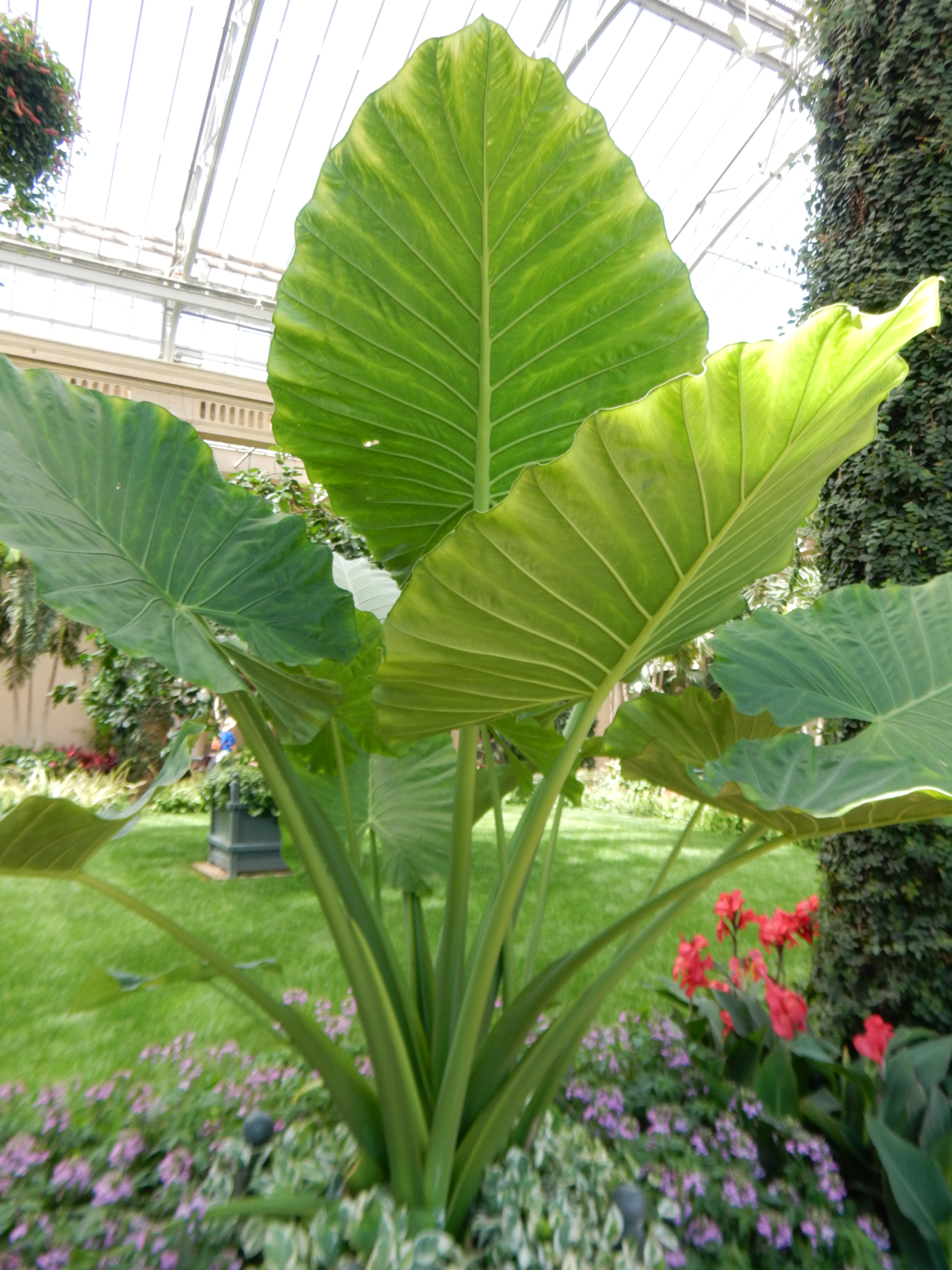

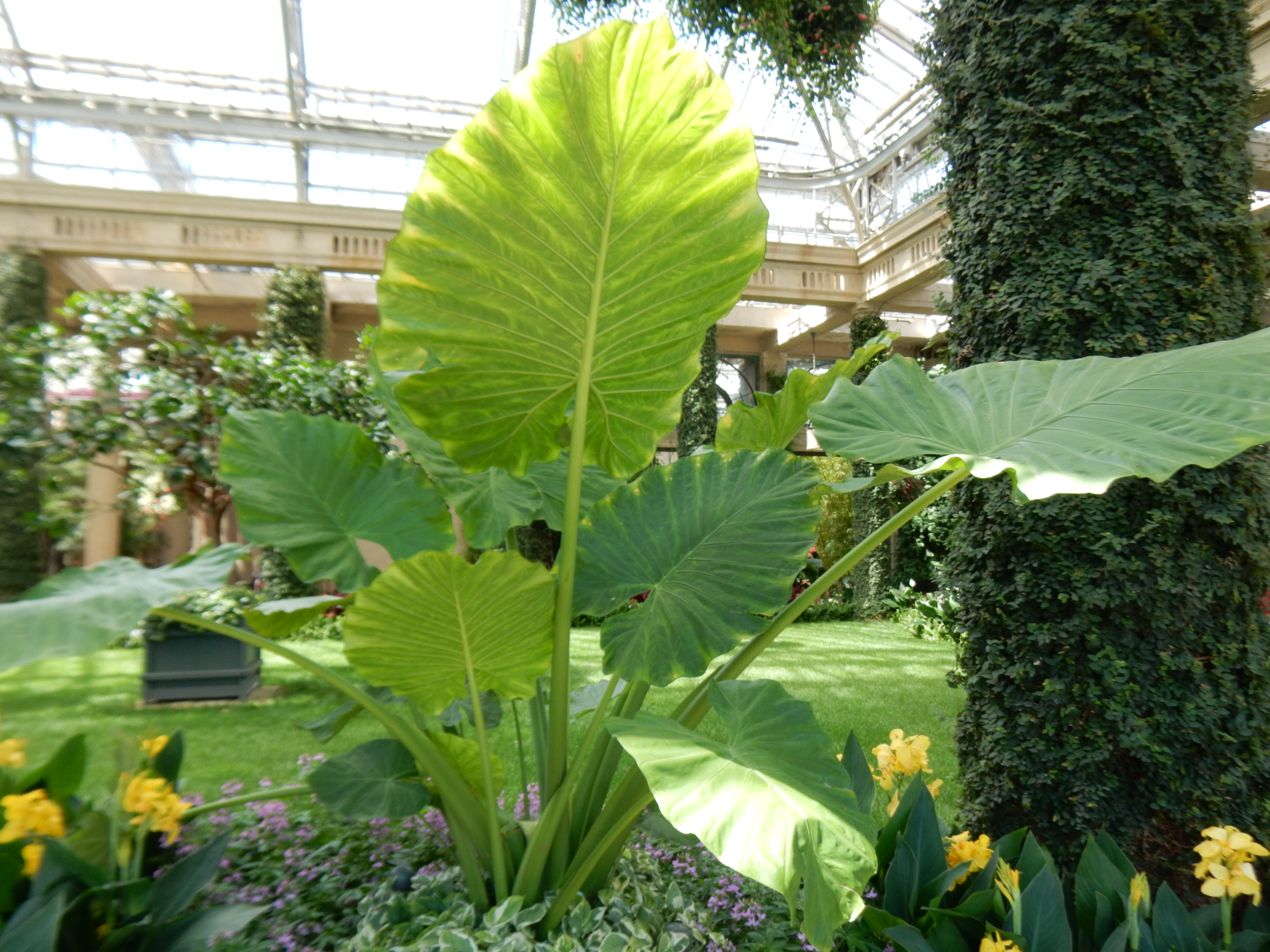
