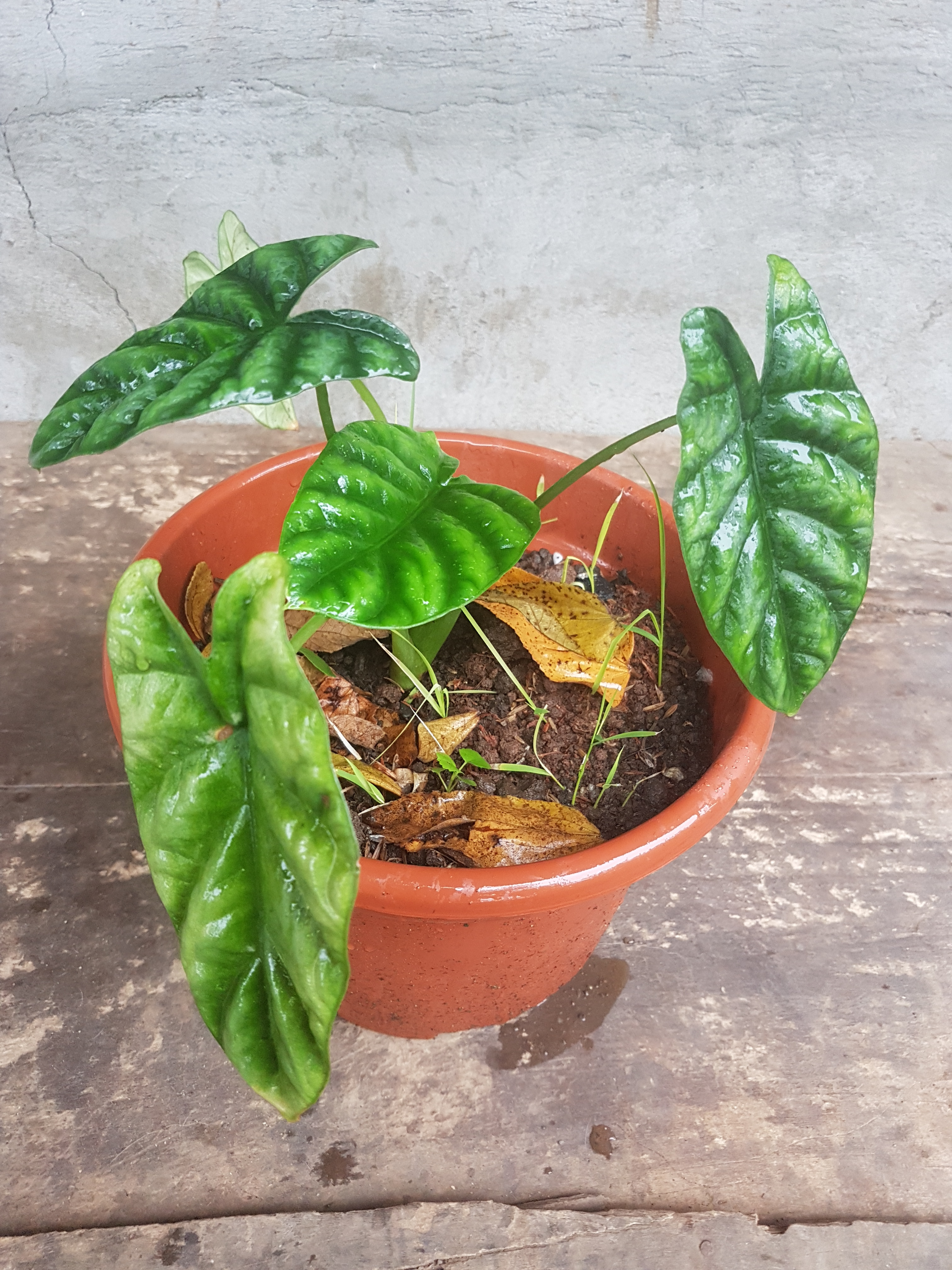
- Cultivated Alocasia sinuata

Conservation status
- Critically Endangered (IUCN 3.1)

Scientific classification
- Kingdom: Plantae
- Clade: Tracheophytes
- Clade: Angiosperms
- Clade: Monocots
- Order: Alismatales
- Family: Araceae
- Genus: Alocasia
- Species: A. sinuata

Binomial name
- Alocasia sinuata N.E.Br.

= Alocasia sinuata =

Species of flowering plant

Alocasia sinuata, commonly known as Alocasia quilted dreams or Alocasia 'Bullata', is a flowering plant in the family Araceae. It is endemic to the limestone forests of Samar, Leyte, and parts of Mindanao in the Philippines. It is classified as critically endangered by the International Union for Conservation of Nature. Despite its critically endangered status, it is grown commonly as a houseplant.

== Distribution ==
It is endemic to the Philippines.

== Taxonomy ==
It was described by Nicholas Edward Brown in The Gardeners' Chronicle in 1885.

== See also ==
- Alocasia micholitziana
- Alocasia nycteris
- Alocasia sanderiana
- Alocasia zebrina
- Alocasia heterophylla
- List of threatened species of the Philippines
