= Mount Polis =

Mountain in the Philippines

- Location within Philippines

Highest point
- Elevation: 1,895 m (6,217 ft)
- Prominence: 120 m (390 ft)
- Coordinates: 16°58′29″N 121°01′45″E

Geography
- Location: Luzon
- Country: Philippines
- Region: Cordillera Administrative Region
- Provinces: Ifugao; Mountain Province
- Parent range: Cordillera Central

Mount Polis is a 6,216-foot (1,895 m) mountain peak located on the borders of the provinces of Ifugao and Mountain Province in the Philippines. It ranks as the third highest mountain in Ifugao province and the 145th highest mountain in Philippines.

In December 1899, Emilio Aguinaldo, President of the First Philippine Republic, transited a pass on the mountain en route from Tirad Pass to Abra province while fleeing American forces during the Philippine–American War.
