= Ergastic substance =

Non-protoplasmic material found in cells

Ergastic substances are non-protoplasmic materials found in cells. The living protoplasm of a cell is sometimes called the bioplasm and distinct from the ergastic substances of the cell. The latter are usually organic or inorganic substances that are products of metabolism, and include crystals, oil drops, gums, tannins, resins and other compounds that can aid the organism in defense, maintenance of cellular structure, or just substance storage. Ergastic substances may appear in the protoplasm, in vacuoles, or in the cell wall.

== Carbohydrates ==
Reserve carbohydrate of plants are the derivatives of the end products of photosynthesis. Cellulose and starch are the main ergastic substances of plant cells. Cellulose is the chief component of the cell wall, and starch occurs as a reserve material in the protoplasm.

Starch, as starch grains, arise almost exclusively in plastids, especially leucoplasts and amyloplasts.

== Proteins ==
Although proteins are the main component of living protoplasm, proteins can occur as inactive, ergastic bodies—in an amorphous or crystalline (or crystalloid) form. A well-known amorphous ergastic protein is gluten.

== Fats and oils ==
Fats (lipids) and oils are widely distributed in plant tissues. Substances related to fats—waxes, suberin, and cutin—occur as protective layers in or on the cell wall.

== Crystals ==
Animals eliminate excess inorganic materials; plants mostly deposit such material in their tissues. Such mineral matter is mostly salts of calcium and anhydrides of silica.

- Raphides are a type of elongated crystalline form of calcium oxalate aggregated in bundles within a plant cell. Because of the needle-like form, large numbers in the tissue of, say, a leaf can render the leaf unpalatable to herbivores (see Dieffenbachia and taro).
- Druse
- Cystolith
