= Alocasia reversa =

Scientific classification
- Kingdom: Plantae
- Clade: Embryophytes
- Clade: Tracheophytes
- Clade: Spermatophytes
- Clade: Angiosperms
- Clade: Monocots
- Order: Alismatales
- Family: Araceae
- Genus: Alocasia
- Species: A. reversa

Binomial name
- Alocasia reversa N.E.Br.

Species of flowering plant

Alocasia reversa is a species of flowering plant in the family Araceae, native to Borneo. In its native habitat it is found on limestone outcrops, so as a houseplant it does not need heavy watering. It gets its specific epithet from the fact that its color pattern is reversed from the typical Alocasia, that is, its coloration is darker on and near the veins.
