= Wilhelm Micholitz =

Wilhelm Micholitz (1854 – December 1932) was a German plant collector who worked for the German-English gardener Henry Frederick Conrad Sander, collecting mainly orchids abroad.

== Life ==
After teaching in the Herrenhausen Gardens in Hanover and in the Kew Gardens in London, and after being the head of the botanical garden in Kiev, Micholtz worked as an "orchid hunter" for London nursery firm J. Sander & Sons. Although his main business included the collection of orchids, he also collected other species for herbarium collections, especially mosses, as well as insects.

Micholitz worked in the Philippines (1884–1885), the Aru Islands (1890), the Maluku Islands (1891), New Guinea and Sumatra (1891–1892), the Ambon Island and the Natuna Islands (1892–1898), Myanmar and South America (1900).
