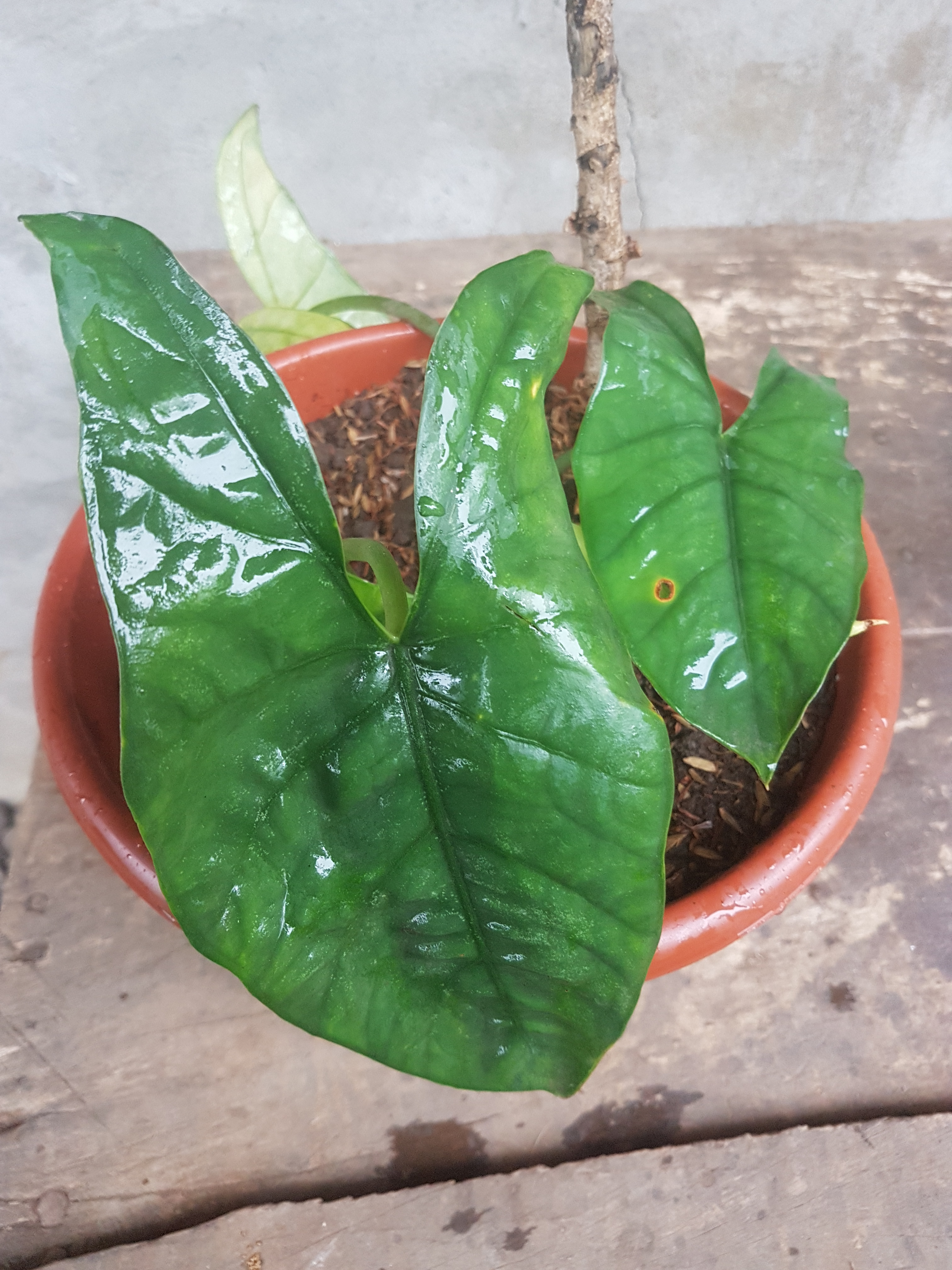
- Alocasia heterophylla in the Philippines

Scientific classification
- Kingdom: Plantae
- Clade: Tracheophytes
- Clade: Angiosperms
- Clade: Monocots
- Order: Alismatales
- Family: Araceae
- Genus: Alocasia
- Species: A. heterophylla

Binomial name
- Alocasia heterophylla (C.Presl) Merr.

Synonyms
- Alocasia manilensis Engl.; Alocasia warburgii Engl.; Caladium heterophyllum C.Presl; Colocasia heterophylla (C.Presl) Kunth

= Alocasia heterophylla =

Species of plant

Alocasia heterophylla is a plant in the family Araceae. It is endemic to the islands of Luzon, Mindanao, and Polillo in the Philippines.

== Description ==
A. heterophylla grows to around 50 centimetres (1.6 ft) tall. It usually bears around 3 to 5 leaves. The petiole is 35 centimetres (1.15 ft) long. The leaves, like its specific name implies, are highly variable in shape, even in one individual. They are usually triangular, sagittate (arrow-shaped), to hastate (spear-shaped). The leaf attachment can be deeply peltate (the inner margins of the back lobes are fused together behind the petiole attachment), shallowly peltate, or non-peltate. The leaves range in size from 20 to 27 centimetres (7.9 to 10.6 in) long. The leaf margins are entire or shallowly sinuate (wavy).

A. heterophylla is very similar to Alocasia ramosii and Alocasia boyceana, which are also endemic to the Philippines and are all grouped with A. heterophylla under the "Heterophylla Group" of the genus Alocasia. It can be distinguished from the other two by having fewer primary lateral veins (3 to 4) that curve towards the distal end of the leaf, the widely separated secondary veins, a gradually constricting spathe, and a conspicuously broader submarginal vein at the leaf margins. Both A. ramosii and A. boyceana are also always non-peltate, while A. heterophylla can sometimes have peltate leaves in mature specimens.

== Habitat ==
Alocasia heterophylla are restricted to limestone-rich areas of the islands of Luzon, Mindanao, and Polillo. They are usually found near beaches at elevations of 29 to 200 metres (95 to 656 ft) above sea level.

== See also ==
- Alocasia sanderiana
- Alocasia micholitziana
- Alocasia nycteris
- Alocasia sinuata
- Alocasia zebrina
