= List of hardy palms =

Hardy palms are any of the species of palm (Arecaceae) that are able to withstand brief periods of colder temperatures and even occasional snowfall. A few palms are native to higher elevations of South Asia where true winter conditions occur, while a few others are native to the warmer parts of the temperate zone in southern Europe, and others are native throughout temperate and subtropical locales in the Americas and Oceania. A few of these temperate climate palms can tolerate hard freezes with little or no damage. Many of these "hardy" species can be cultivated in warmer parts of temperate and subtropical climates.

The cold hardiness of palms varies by species. The hardiest species are found in the tribe Trachycarpeae, Washingtonia, and Rhapis, with species which are found in the wild in areas where the mean temperature of the coldest month of the year is not much less than 5 °C (41 °F), and Trachycarpus, with species which are found in the wild in areas where the mean temperature of the coldest month of the year is as low as 0.2 °C (32.4 °F). Members of the above palms and other genera are sometimes grown in areas where they are not truly hardy, overwintering with the aid of various kinds of artificial protection.

== Fan palms ==
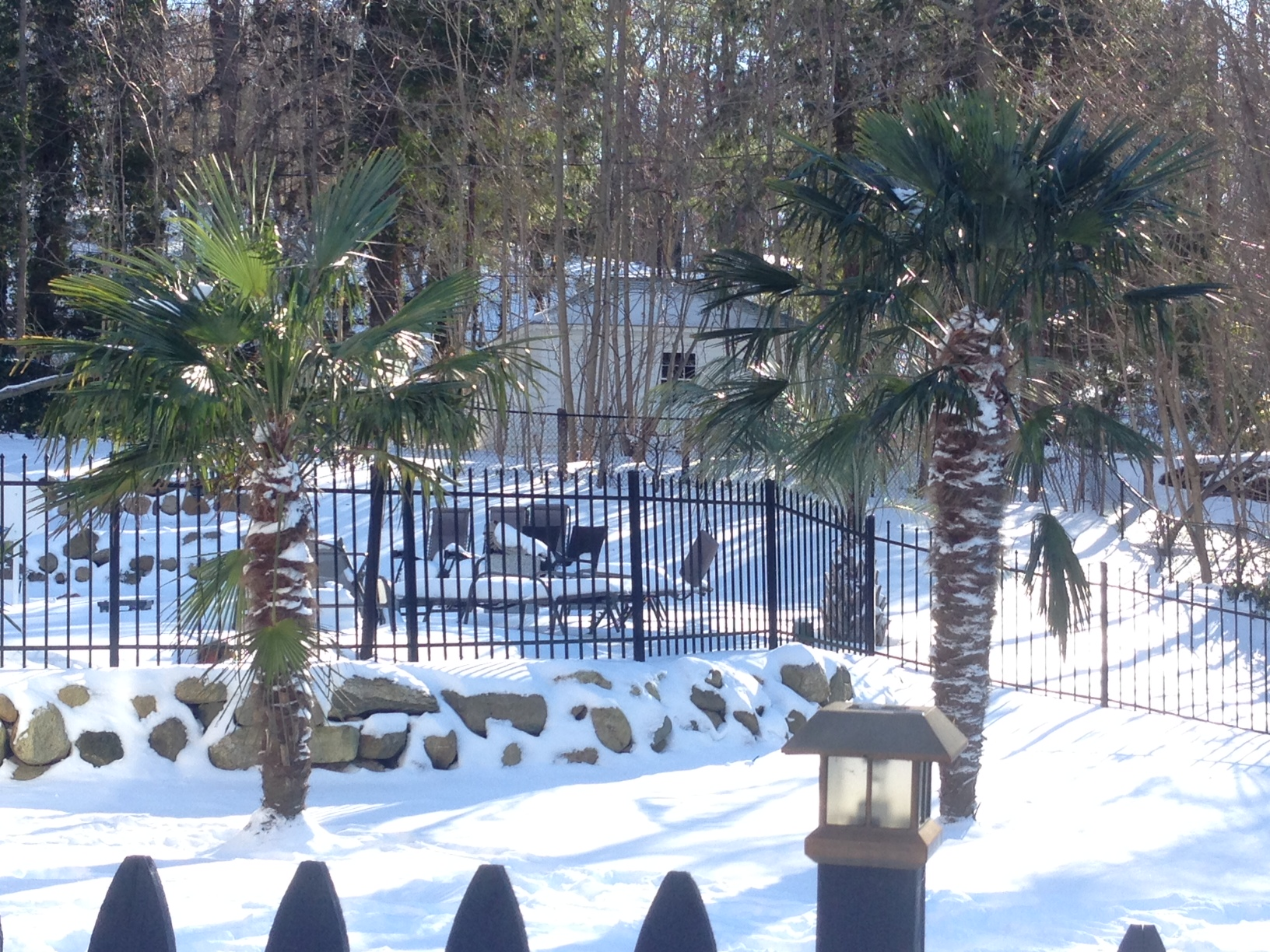
Trachycarpus fortunei covered with dusting of snow on Long Island, New York

The fan palms (Arecaceae tribe Corypheae; palms with fan-shaped leaves) include all of the hardiest palms.

- Trachycarpus palms (particularly Chusan palm T. fortunei and Kumaon palm T. takil) – these are considered to be the most cold hardy palms in the world. These tough species are native to eastern China, Myanmar, and the Himalayas where severe (though brief) winter conditions occur. Hardy to about −15 to −20 °C (5 to −4 °F) unprotected, with exceptional tolerance recorded of −27 °C (−17 °F), they grow at high altitudes where temperatures are cool. It is also tolerant of low summer temperatures. Mature specimens can also be found in Ireland, throughout Great Britain (north to northwestern Scotland), southwestern Canada (in the city of Vancouver and on Vancouver Island), southern Switzerland (Ticino). Trachycarpus is also grown extensively in Japan, Australia, and New Zealand. In the United States, Trachycarpus is cultivated along the Pacific coast and as far north as Washington and along the Atlantic coast as far north as southern Connecticut. Large mature specimens can be found from Maryland south to Georgia, though numbers decline toward southern Georgia south toward Florida, where native palms exist. Across the interior of the United States, there are reports of long term specimens that have survived north to the Ohio River, with several long term plantings in the higher elevations of Tennessee and western North Carolina. It is rated as winter hardy to USDA zone 7. Trachycarpus palms are the most cold and cool summer hardy of all the palms, although absolute minimum temperature may be exceeded by needle palms, Sabal minor, as well as very brief nighttime cold exposure to desert palms. For instance, on the northern coast of Estonia, in hardiness zone 6, individual Trachycarpus fortunei are also grown. The northernmost reported growing successfully are at 62°N latitude in Tórshavn in the Faroe Islands.
- Mediterranean fan palm (Chamaerops humilis) – the only palm native to southern Europe besides the Cretan date palm, it is very drought-tolerant and hardy to −12 °C (10 °F), but does prefer hot summers. Despite the fact that this palm is less hardy than many palms listed here, it has the northernmost native habitat. It is rated as winter hardy to USDA zone 8. It is found in abundance across most of southwestern Europe and northwestern Africa. It is a very slow-growing plant. The blue variety Chamaerops humilis var. argentea (syn. var. cerifera), native to high elevations of the Atlas Mountains, has recently been introduced into the trade and early reports indicate that it may be 5 °C (9 °F) or more degrees hardier than the green variety.
- Needle palm (Rhapidophyllum hystrix) – this clustering and usually trunkless palm is native to the subtropical southeastern United States, from central Florida to Georgia, Mississippi, South Carolina and Alabama in the United States. It is considered hardy to −20 °C (−4 °F), and is cultivated along the East Coast from Florida to southern Massachusetts, and along the West Coast from California to Seattle. They have proven hardy in the Tennessee Valley region and up into the lower Ohio Valley. The needle palm is very slow-growing and rarely reaches heights of over 1 m (3 ft 3 in), though very old specimens in the deep south can reach 5 m (16 ft) in height and width. There are documented specimens that have been growing in White County, Tennessee, since the early part of the 1960s, as well as the United States National Arboretum in the city of Washington D.C., that are at 3 m (9.8 ft) in height.
- Mazari palm (Nannorrhops richtiana) – this palm, native to the dry, mountainous terrains of northern Pakistan, Afghanistan, Iran and surrounding regions, is also thought to be extremely cold hardy (perhaps to about −20 °C or −4 °F), though also requiring hot summers and dry soils. However, due to its limited availability in cultivation, not much is known about this palm. Mazari palm is not easy to grow; perfect drainage and full sun are required for this palm to survive. This palm will not tolerate wet freezes.
- Saw palmetto (Serenoa repens) – these palms are native to Florida and coastal areas from South Carolina to Louisiana. They are found in various pine-dominated habitats (such as Longleaf pine ecosystem, Loblolly pine areas, and South Florida pine flatwoods), and in scrub, dry hammocks, and dry and wet prairie.
- Sabal palms (palmettos; 13 species) – these palms are native to the southeastern United States, Mexico, Central America, and the Caribbean. The cabbage palmetto (Sabal palmetto), the state tree of both Florida and South Carolina, is widely cultivated along the south Atlantic and Gulf of Mexico coast of the United States, and needs hot and humid summers to grow. The species is considered hardy to USDA Hardiness Zone 8, and may survive short periods of temperatures as low as −14 °C (7 °F). Large and older specimens can be found from southeastern Virginia south to Florida and west to Texas. There are a few documented smaller specimens of cabbage palm growing in zone 7b in southern Maryland, Delaware, and coastal Connecticut in the city of Bridgeport. The Mexican palmetto (Sabal mexicana) is a close relative of the cabbage palmetto that is native to southern Texas and northern Mexico. Dwarf palmetto (Sabal minor) is considered hardy to USDA zone 6b, like the needle palm. It can tolerate short periods of temperatures as low as −18 °C (0 °F). Endemic to the swamps and lowlands of the south Atlantic and Gulf of Mexico coast of the United States, it can stand long periods of heat and drought. Sabal minor is successfully cultivated across the entire southern United States below 35 latitude, and up the East Coast to 41 latitude and up the West Coast to 45 latitude.
- Caranday palm (Trithrinax campestris) – this South American palm is native of sabanas in Uruguay and northeastern Argentina. It is a palm that grows in arid, well drained, rocky soils. Its distinctive features are its compact shape, short green to greyish foliage, and trunk fully hidden by dry dead branches (coat) remaining from several previous seasons. It is very resistant to drought, and -9 °C/-15 °C temperatures when not in growing season, although it tends to shed its leaves in these conditions. It is one of the most cold-hardy palms in the world, because it also grows in the mountains of Sierras de Córdoba.
- Washingtonia palms (Washingtonia filifera var. filifera, W. filifera var. robusta) – these palms are native to southern California and northwest Mexico, growing as high as 30 m (98 ft) in their native habitat. W. filifera is hardy to −12 °C (10 °F); it prefers a dry Mediterranean climate, though it still grows in areas with humid subtropical climates like Brisbane, Sydney, Houston, and New Orleans. It is sometimes grown in containers, or planted as short-term specimens in areas where it is not quite hardy. W. f. var. robusta is somewhat less hardy, native to the Baja California Peninsula of northern Mexico It has a more robust trunk and stiffer leaves than W. filifera, and is hardy to −10 °C (14 °F).
- Livistona australis – It is native to southeastern Australia.
- Rhapis excelsa – native to China and it is hardy to about −7 °C (19 °F).
- Mexican blue palm (Brahea armata) – native to Baja California in Mexico and hardy to about −8 °C (18 °F).

== Pinnate-leaved palms ==
Few palms with pinnate leaves tolerate much frost. They belong to several tribes of the Arecaceae, with the species listed here belonging to Tribe Areceae (Chamaedorea), Tribe Cocoseae (Butia, Jubaea) and Tribe Phoeniceae (Phoenix).

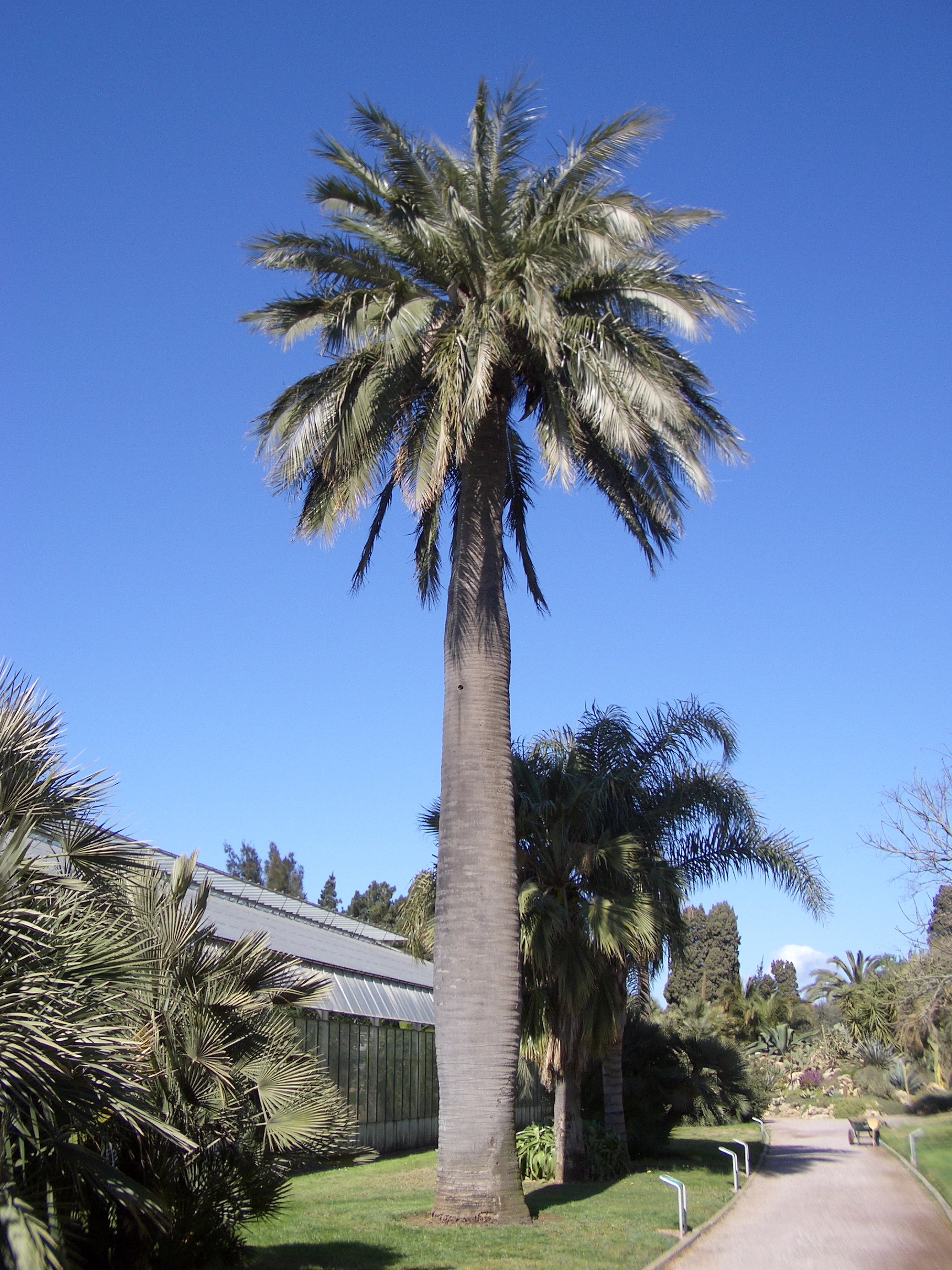
Jubaea chilensis in France

- Chilean wine palm (Jubaea chilensis) – a contender for the hardiest pinnate-leaved palm, it is hardy to about −12 °C (10 °F) and has been cultivated successfully as far north as Seattle, Vancouver and London. This palm does not perform well in hot, humid tropical climates.
- Butia palm or jelly palm, pindo palm (Butia odorata) – along with Jubaea, possibly the hardiest known pinnate-leaved palm. B. odorata is a palm native to Brazil and Uruguay. This palm grows up to 6 m (20 ft), exceptionally 8 m (26 ft), in a slow but steady manner. It is easily identifiable with beautiful pinnate leaves that arch outwards from a thick stout trunk. B. odorata is notable as one of the hardiest feather palms, tolerating temperatures down to about −10 °C (14 °F); it is widely cultivated in warm temperate regions. It is commonly grown on the East Coast of the United States as far north as Virginia Beach, Virginia and Portland and Seattle on the West coast. It thrives in humid subtropical climates. This tree is commonly known as the "jelly palm" because of the sticky, edible, date-like fruit it produces, which is used in many South American countries to make jelly.
- Butia eriospatha (woolly jelly palm) – though it may be more cold tolerant, in North America it is not found in cultivation as much as B. ordorata. This may be due to being native to a remote mountainous region of southern Brazil, at altitudes of 1,000 m (3,300 ft), where the weather is more similar to the Pacific Northwest, with wet winters and cool summer days.
- Chamaedorea microspadix and Chamaedorea radicalis – the hardiest known species in the genus Chamaedorea. Both species come from Mexico and are considered stem hardy to about −11 °C (12 °F), although they will lose their leaves at temperatures below about −6 °C (21 °F).

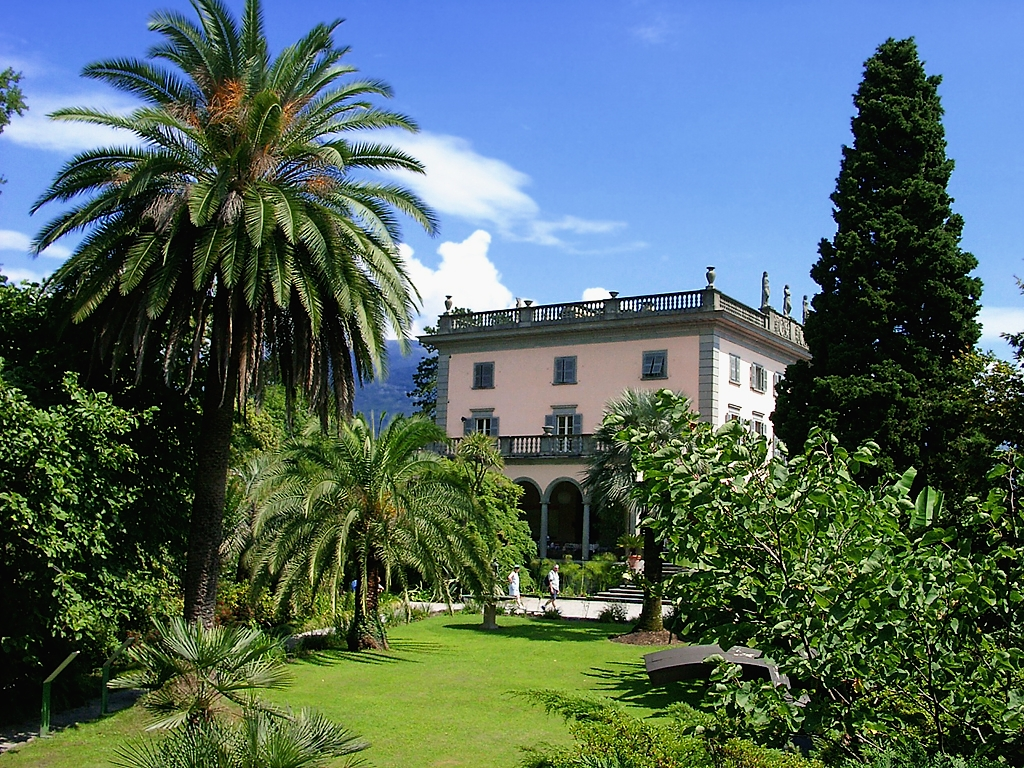
Canary Island date palm in southern Switzerland in central Europe

- Canary Island date palm (Phoenix canariensis) – this species is hardy to about −10 °C (14 °F), and is grown as far north as the south of England (50° N), producing viable seed (in Southsea, Hampshire, England). In North America mature specimens can be found as far north as Gold Beach, Oregon (42.5° N) on the West Coast, and Wilmington, North Carolina (35.2° N) on the East Coast. This palm is one of the most commonly grown palms in the world, and is well adapted to low humidity and little watering; it is used as an ornamental tree in both Mediterranean climates and desert climates. In more humid climates, these trees will often be seen with sword ferns sprouting just beneath the crown.
- Cretan date palm (Phoenix theophrasti) – another species of Phoenix which shows similar frost tolerance, or it may be even hardier. Native to Crete in Greece and southwest Turkey, but has not been adequately tested for hardiness.
- Date palm (Phoenix dactylifera) – this relative of the Canary Island date palm, and producer of the edible date fruit, is also hardy to about −11 °C (12 °F), but does not tolerate very wet areas. This palm is one of the staple plants of the Middle East for its versatility and edible fruit.
- Ceroxylon quindiuense – native to the Colombian Andes, where it is found at 2,500–2,800 m (8,200–9,200 ft) above sea level. At this altitude it tolerates occasional frosts for short periods of time.
- Syagrus romanzoffiana (Queen palm) - native to South America; Brazil, Argentina, Uruguay. Cold hardy to USDA Zone 9B and will survive temperatures as low as −4 °C (25 °F).
- Ceroxylon alpinum – native to the Andes.
- Archontophoenix cunninghamiana – native to Australia.
- Beccariophoenix alfredii – native to Madagascar, slightly frost hardy. Resembles a coconut palm.
- Howea forsteriana – native to Lord Howe Island in Australia.
- Rhopalostylis sapida – native to New Zealand. It is the southernmost palm in the world, found as far south as 44°S.
- Caryota – generally considered tolerant to occasional frosts.
- Chrysalidocarpus decipiens – native to Madagascar.
- Calamus caryotoides – native to Queensland, Australia.
- Calamus erectus – native to southern Asia.

== Plants referred to as palms ==
Some plants used in subtropical landscaping in temperate climates like much of Europe, northern China/Japan, Korea, the northern USA, New Zealand, etc. that are commonly referred to as "palms", but are not palms, i.e. not members of the family Arecaceae, include: Aloidendron barberae, Beaucarnea recurvata, Berberis eurybracteata, Cordyline australis, Cordyline indivisa, Cycas revoluta, Dasylirion, Cyathea australis, Cyathea capensis, Cyathea cooperi, Cyathea dealbata, Cyathea medullaris, Dicksonia antarctica, Dicksonia squarrosa, Dioon angustifolium, Dioon edule, Encephalartos, Macrozamia communis, Macrozamia johnsonii, Macrozamia riedlei, Mahonia oiwakensis, Musa basjoo, Musa sikkimensis, Pseudopanax ferox, Rhus typhina, Xanthorrhoea, Yucca aloifolia, Yucca gigantea, Yucca rostrata and Zamia integrifolia.

== Gallery ==
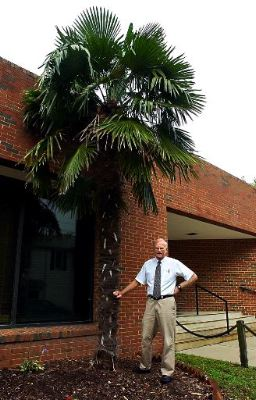
Mature Trachycarpus fortunei on Solomons Island in southern Maryland

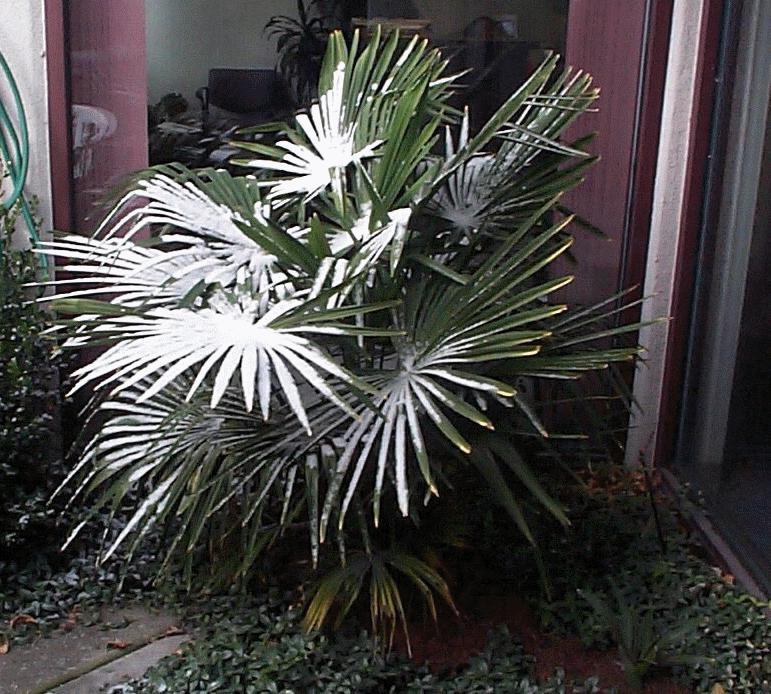
Trachycarpus fortunei dusted with snow in Grand Junction, Colorado

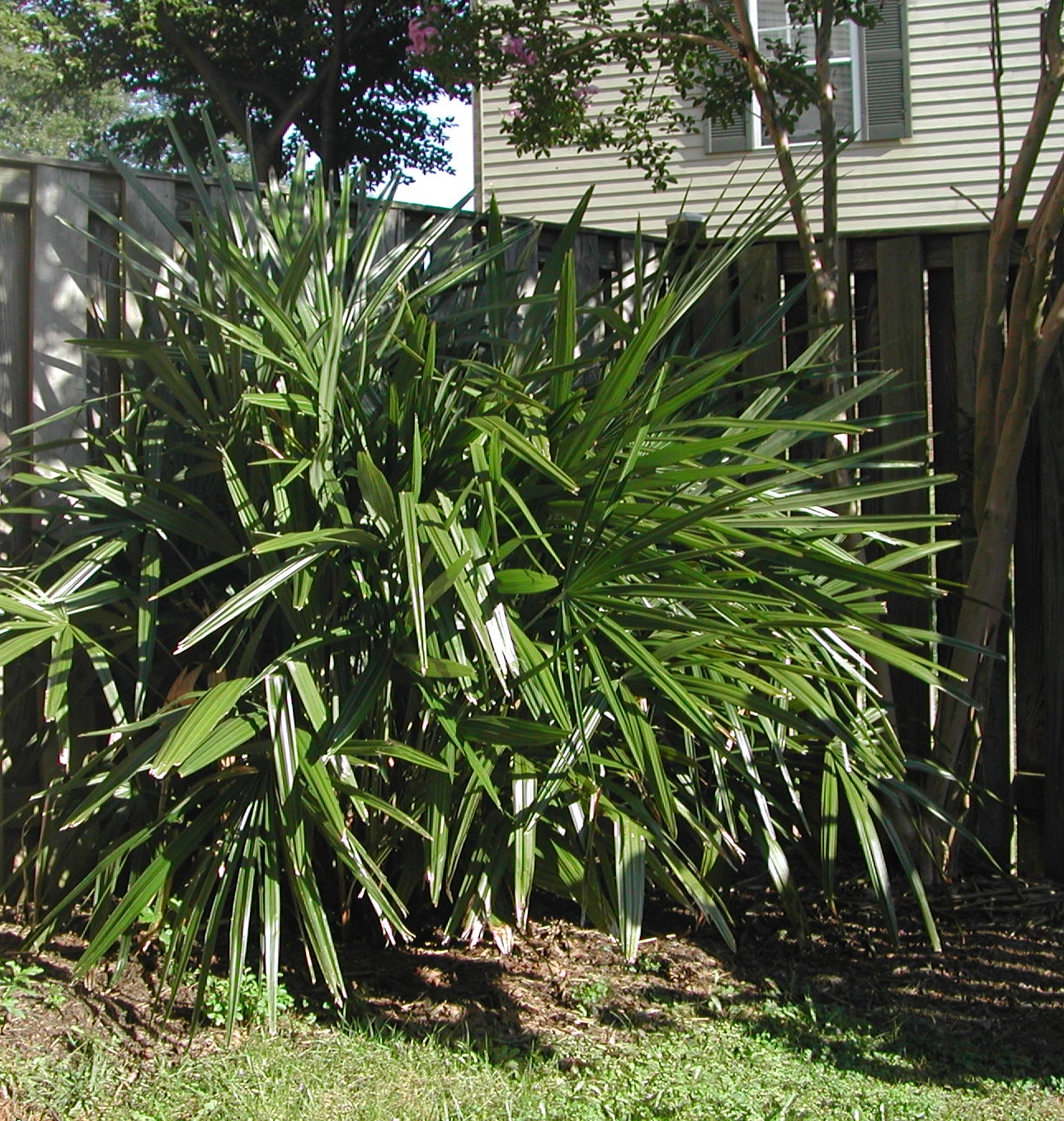
Rhapidophyllum hystrix In Silver Spring, Maryland

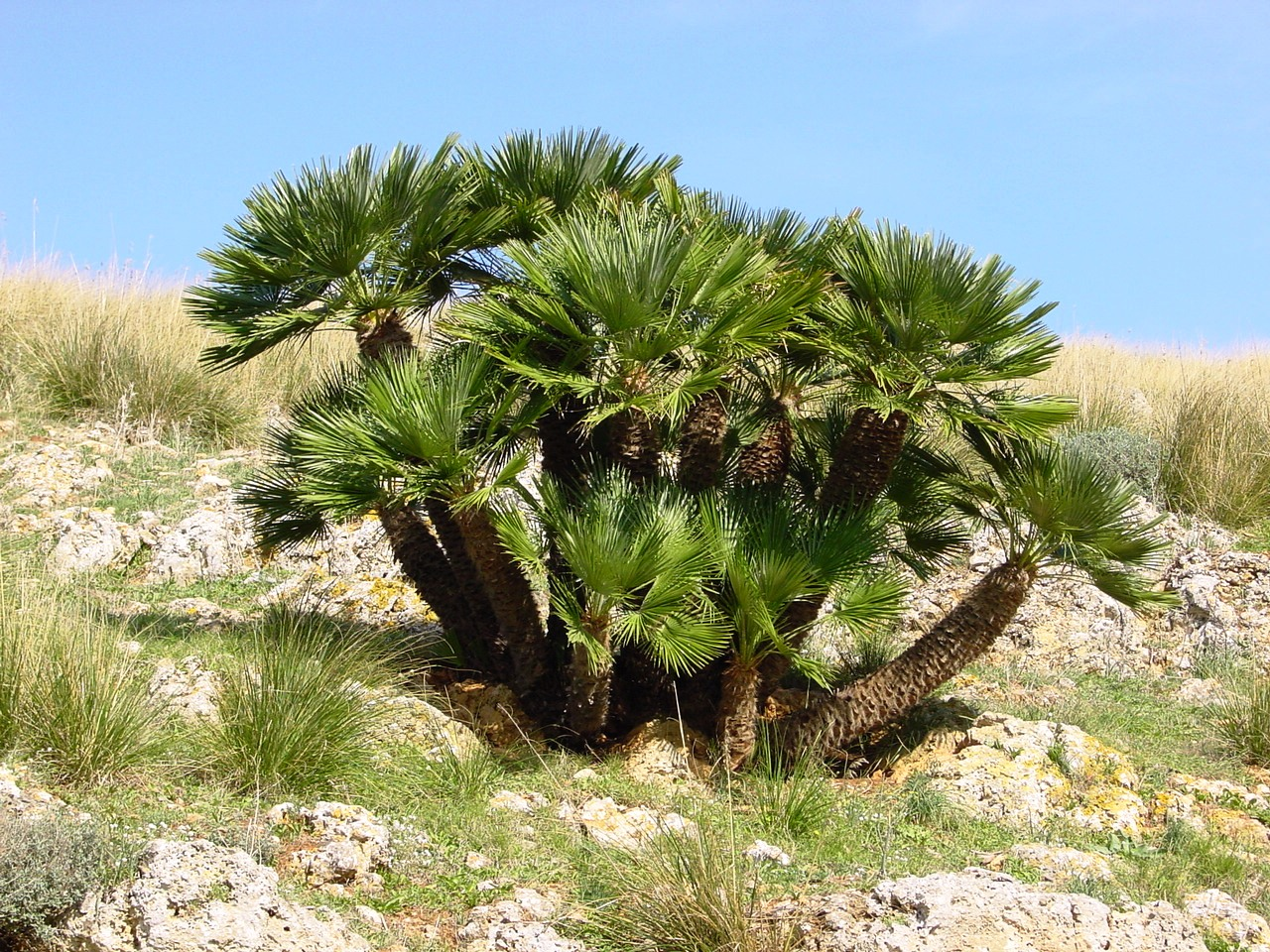
Chamaerops humilis

Washingtonia filifera var. robusta

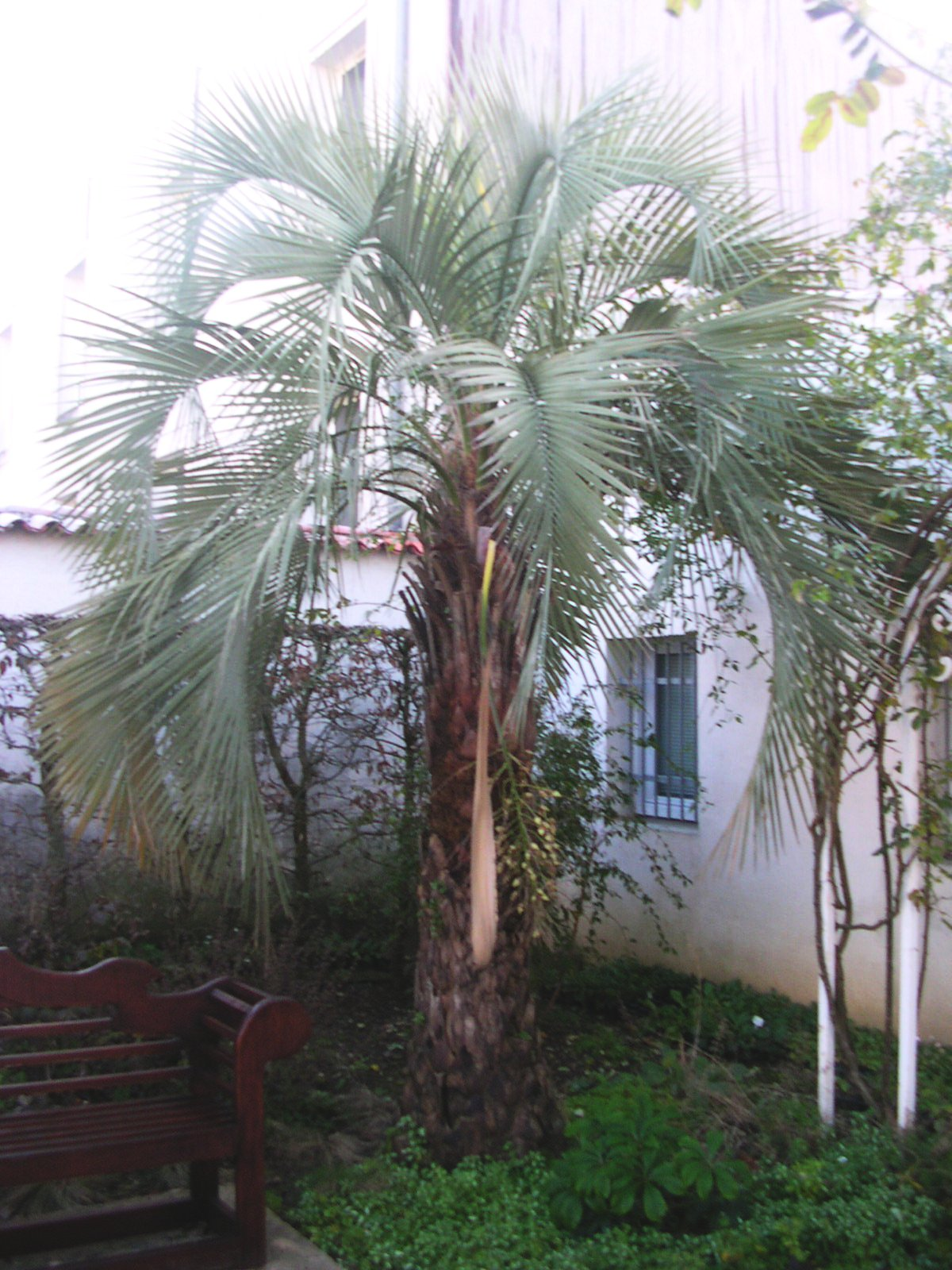
Butia odorata In France

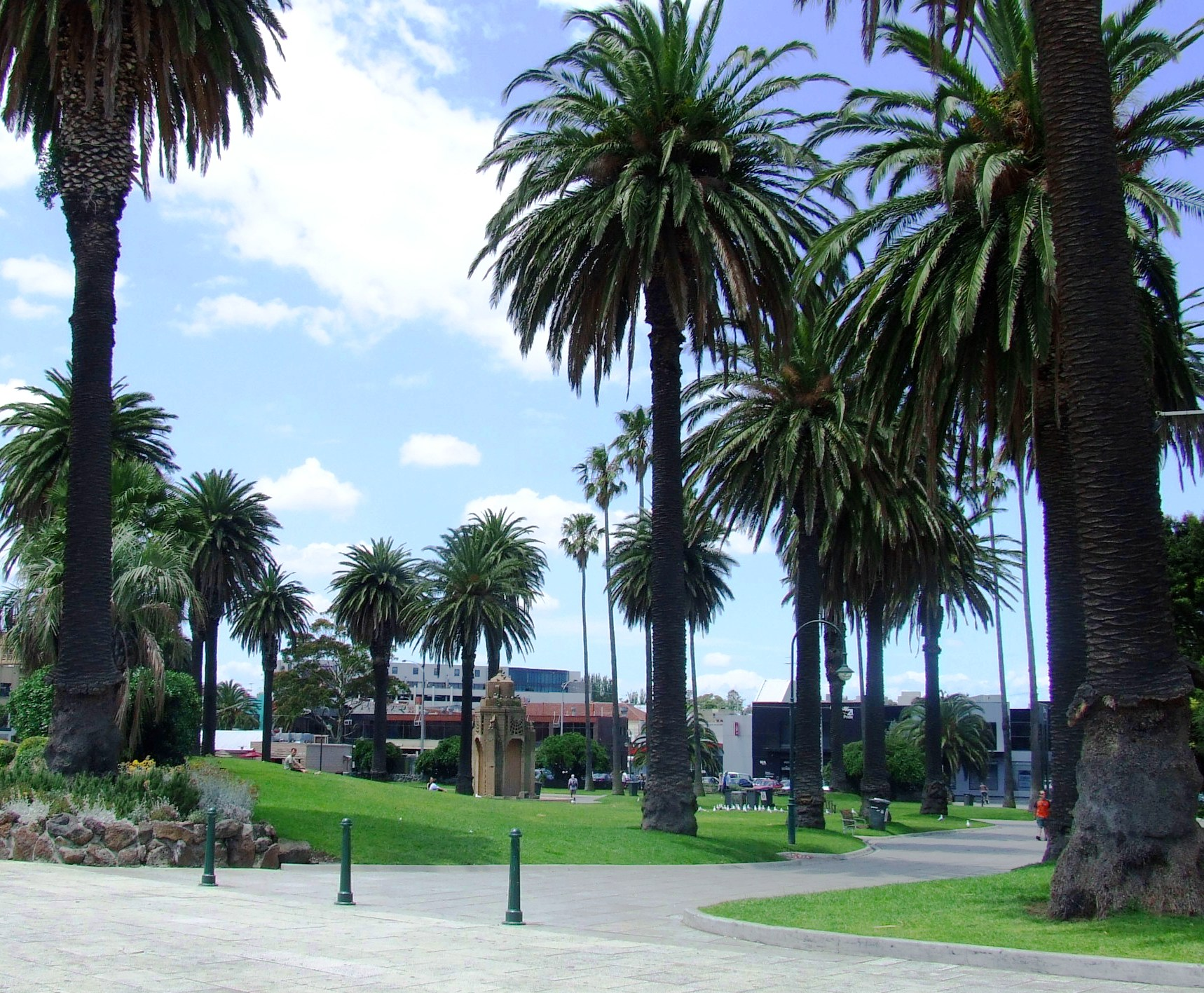
Phoenix canariensis In Melbourne, Australia

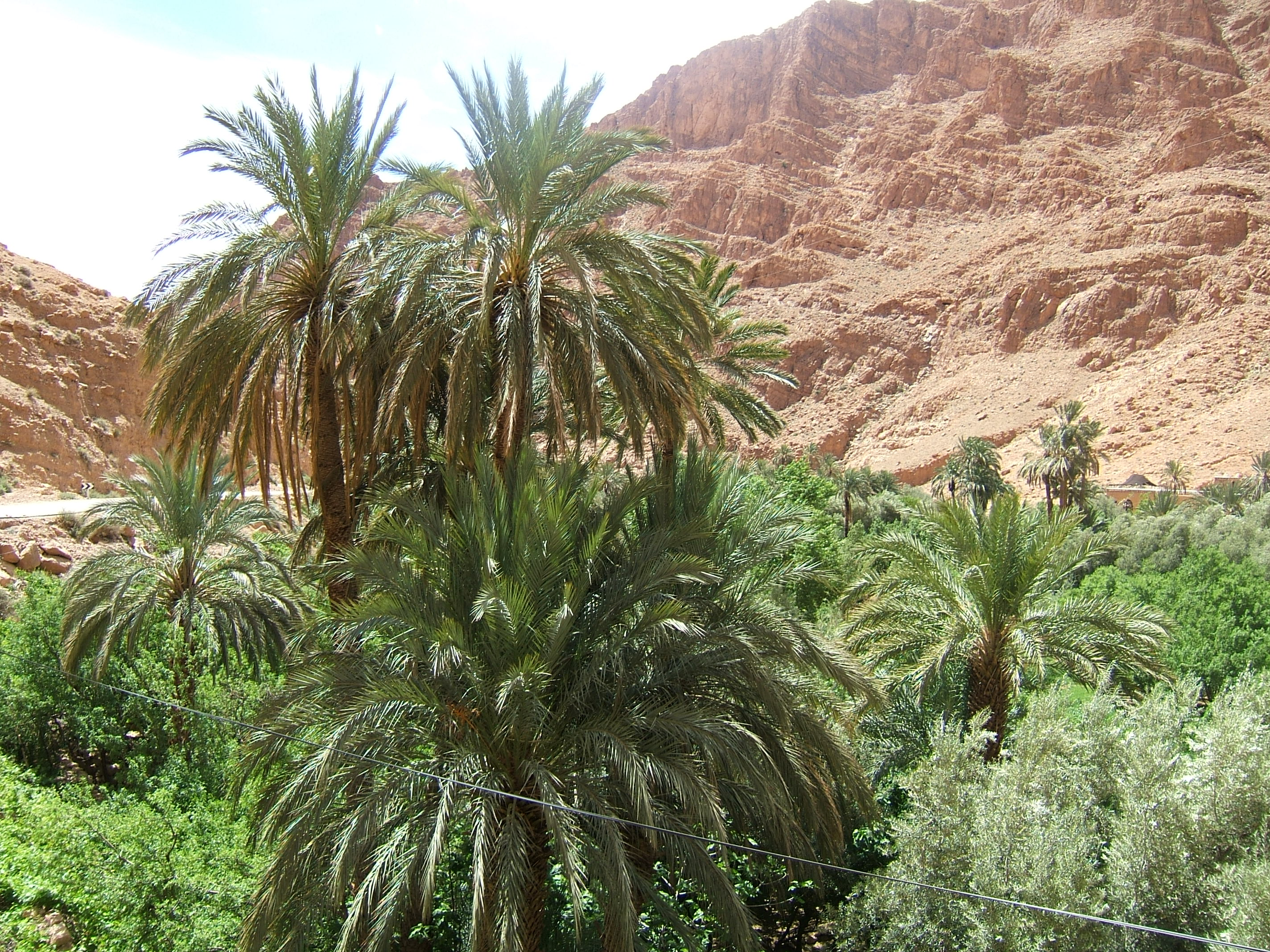
Phoenix dactylifera planted in Morocco

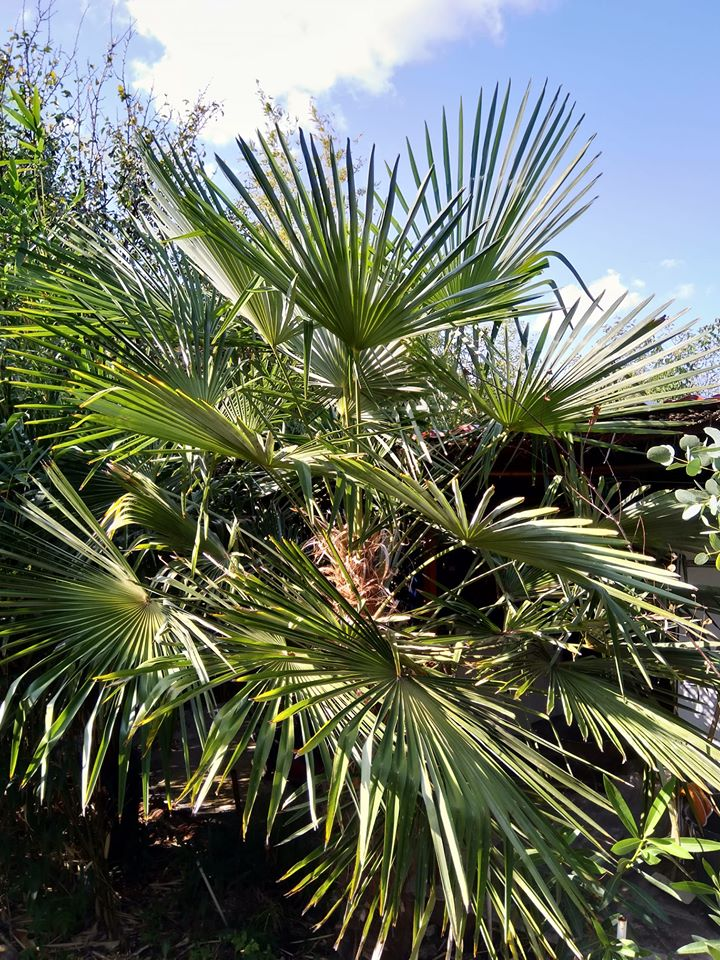
Trachycarpus fortunei in Krapets, Bulgaria

== See also ==
- List of hardy gingers
- List of hardy bananas
- List of hardy passionflowers
