= Toshiko Taira =

Japanese textile artist (1921–2022)

- Born: 14 February 1921; Ogimi, Okinawa, Japan
- Died: 13 September 2022 (aged 101)
- Occupation: Textile artist

Toshiko Taira (平良 敏子, Taira Toshiko; 14 February 1921 – 13 September 2022) was a Japanese textile artist who was based in Okinawa. She created kijōka-bashōfu, a cloth made from the fibre of the Musa basjoo, otherwise known as the Japanese fibre banana plant. Taira became a designated Living National Treasure of Japan in 2000.

== Biography ==
Taira was born on 14 February 1921 in Ōgimi. As a child, she learned to weave cotton and kijōka-bashōfu from her mother. In 1944, Taira worked at a spinning mill in Kurashiki, Okayama. At the encouragement of the mill's owner, Soichiro Ohara, she began to study under Kichinosuke Tonomura, the head of a folk art museum. During this time she was heavily influenced by the mingei movement. When she returned to Okinawa in 1946 she found that many of the banana trees had been cut down or died, and was determined to revitalize both the trees and the art of kijōka-bashōfu.

After World War II, for kimono made from kijōka-bashōfu fell; Taira began to make table runners and cushions from coarse bashōfu plant fibers, but was criticized for bringing down the quality associated with kijōka-bashōfu. Following this, Taira began to work more frequently with finer bashōfu fibers. During this period, Taira also held some exhibitions of her work. Taira opened a bashōfu textile studio in 1963 and hired some local weavers in order to centralize and increase her production.

Kijōka-bashōfu was designated as an Important Intangible Cultural Property in 1974. The Kijoka Basho-fu Industrial Cooperative Association was established in 1984, and in 1986, the Ogimi Village Bashofu Hall opened and began offering training. In 2000, Taira was recognized as a Living National Treasure. In 1992 and 2002 she was awarded an Order of the Precious Crown.

Several museums hold her works in their collections, including the Metropolitan Museum of Art and the British Museum.

Taira turned 100 on 14 February 2021, and died on 13 September 2022, at the age of 101.
