= T. nana =

T. nana may refer to:

- Trachycarpus nanus, a flowering plant species found only in China
- Turnix nanus, the black-rumped buttonquail, a bird species

== Synonyms ==
- Taenia nana, a synonym for Hymenolepis nana, the dwarf tapeworm, a cosmopolitan cestode species that is one of the most common cestodes of humans in the world

== See also ==
- Nana (disambiguation)
