= List of hardy bananas =

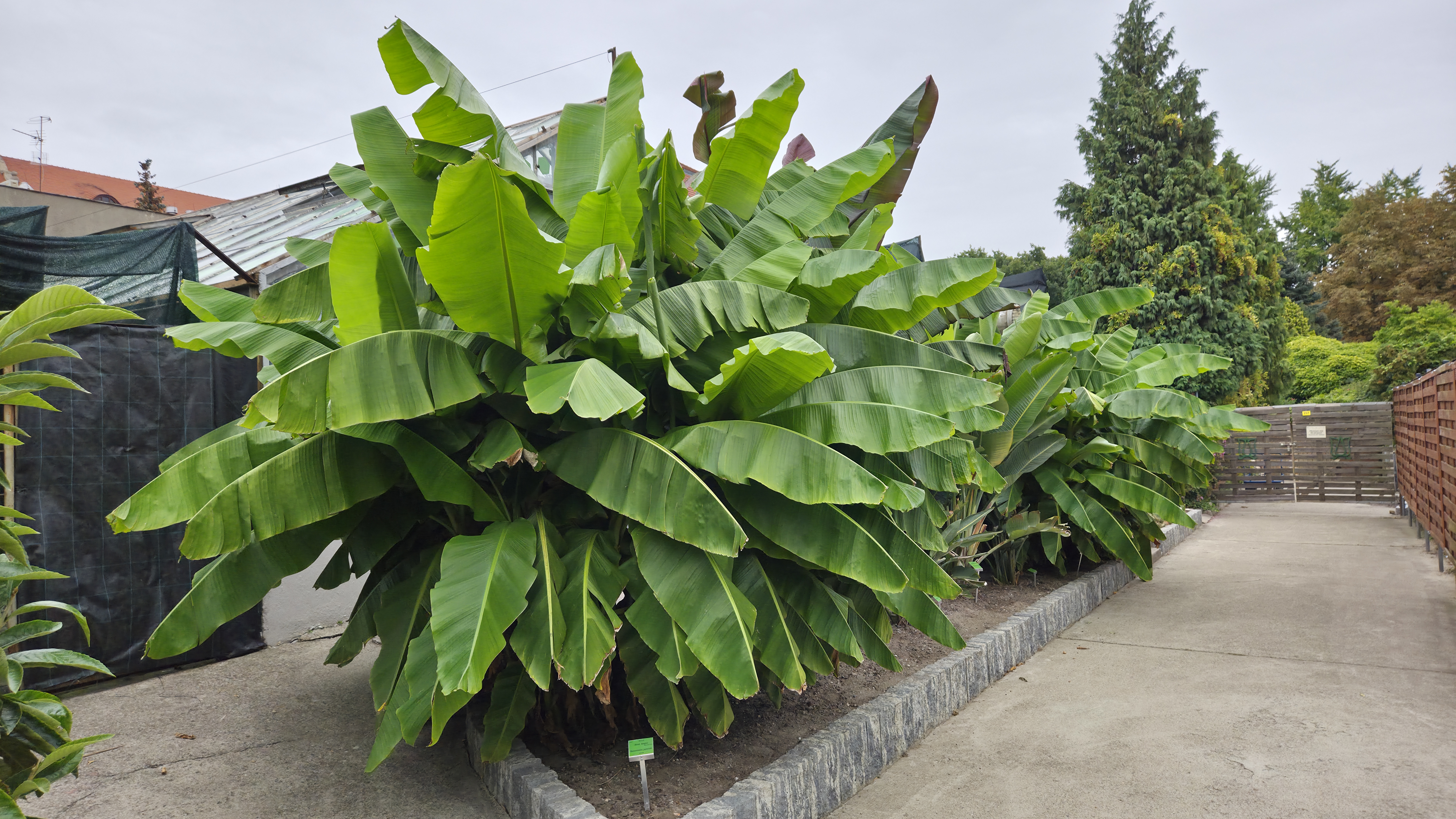
Musa basjoo

Hardy bananas are any of the species of bananas (Musaceae) that are able to withstand brief periods of colder temperatures and even occasional snowfall.

- Musa basjoo – Native to Sichuan in China. The roots are considered hardy to −10 °C (14 °F).
- Musa itinerans – Native to Assam and is cold hardy variety of banana grown from zones 6
- Musella lasiocarpa – Native to Sichuan, Guizhou and Yunnan Provinces in China, where it grows high in the mountains up to an altitude of 2500 m.
- Musa sikkimensis – It is one of the highest altitude banana species and is found in Bhutan and India.
- Musa velutina – Native to East Himalaya to Assam and is hardy to zone 7b
- Musa yunnanensis – Native to Yunnan in China. It is both shade and frost tolerant.

== See also ==
- List of hardy gingers
- List of hardy passionflowers
- List of cold hardy palms
