= T. princeps =

T. princeps may refer to:

- Tipula princeps, a crane fly species in the genus Tipula
- Trachycarpus princeps, a palm species endemic to Yunnan in southern central China
