= List of hardy passionflowers =

Hardy Passionflowers are any of the species of passionflowers (Passifloraceae) that are able to withstand brief periods of colder temperatures and even occasional snowfall.

- Passiflora affinis - Is native to desert regions of Texas and is cold hardy and drought tolerant variety of passionflower grown from zones 8.
- Passiflora arizonica - Arizona passionflower is native to the Sonoran desert and is cold hardy and drought tolerant variety of passionflower grown from zones 8.
- Passiflora caerulea - Common passionflower or Hardy Passion Flower is cold hardy and drought tolerant variety of passionflower grown from zones 6.
- Passiflora foetida - is native to the desert southwest US and is cold hardy and drought tolerant variety of passionflower grown from zones 8.
- Passiflora incarnata - Maypop is native to central and eastern United States, and is cold hardy and drought tolerant variety of passionflower grown from zones 5.
- Passiflora lutea - Known as the Hardy Yellow Passionflower. It is native to the United States from Pennsylvania west to Kansas, and south to Florida and Texas, and is cold hardy variety of passionflower grown from zones 5.
- Passiflora mexicana - is native to Sonoran desert in Arizona and Mexico, and is cold hardy and drought tolerant variety of passionflower grown from zones 8.
- Passiflora suberosa - is native to Texas and is cold hardy variety of passionflower grown from zones 8.
- Passiflora tenuiloba - Birdwing passionflower is native to Chihuahuan Desert, New Mexico and Texas and is cold hardy and drought tolerant variety of passionflower grown from zones 8.
- Passiflora tucumanensis - Formerly called Passiflora naviculata and native to the mountains of Paraguay, Argentina and Bolivia, and is cold hardy variety of passionflower grown from zones 6.

== See also ==
- List of hardy gingers
- List of hardy bananas
- List of cold hardy palms
