= Kijōka-bashōfu =

Japanese cloth making craft

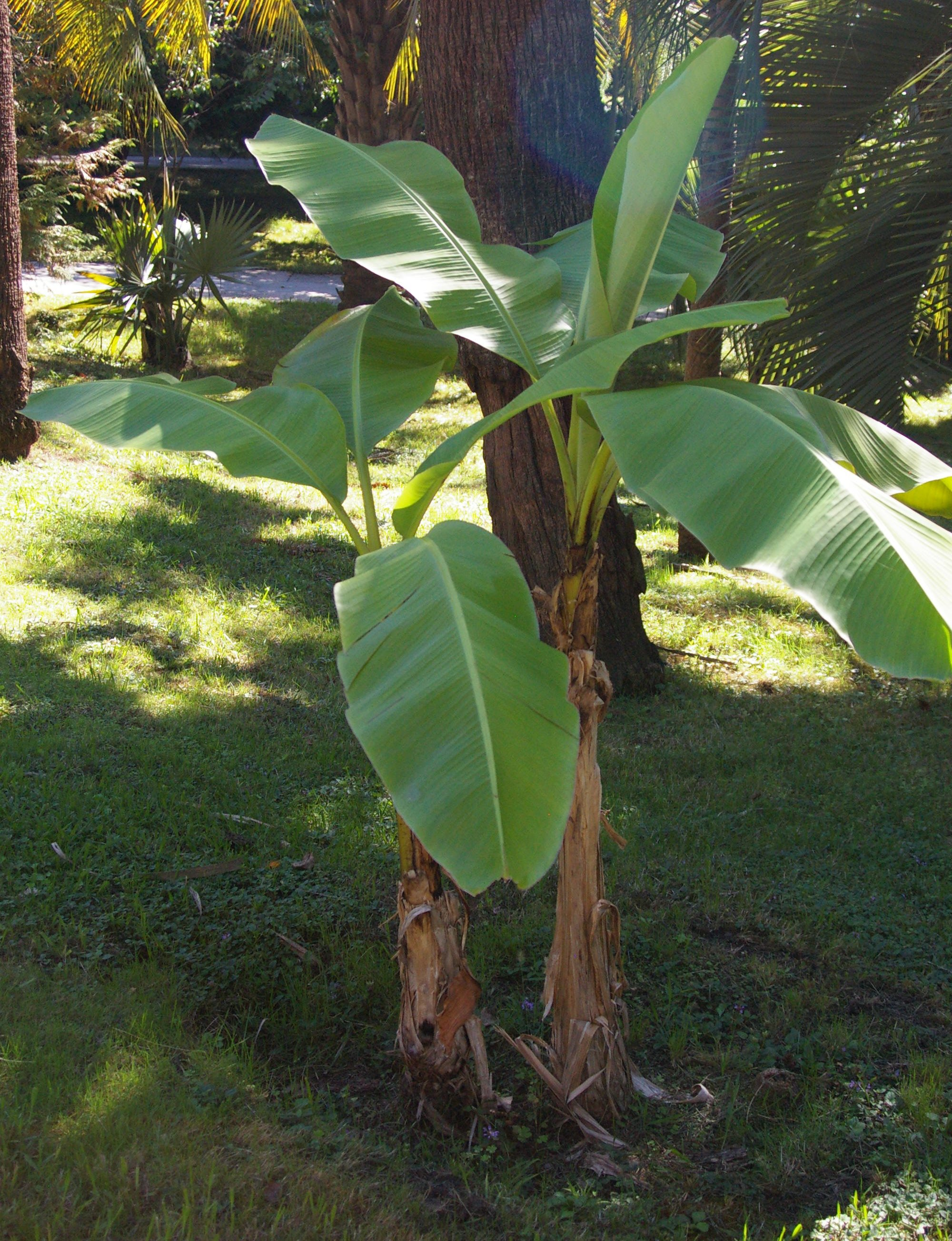
The bashō or Japanese fibre banana, used in the making of kijōka-bashōfu

Kijōka-bashōfu (喜如嘉の芭蕉布) is the Japanese craft of making cloth from the bashō or Japanese fibre banana as practiced in Kijōka in Ogimi, Okinawa. Like linen, hemp, ramie and other long vegetable fibres, it does not stick to the skin in hot weather; as such it is suitable for the climate of Okinawa. Kijōka-bashōfu is recognized as one of the Important Intangible Cultural Properties of Japan.

== History ==
Bashōfu formed part of the tribute to Ming dynasty China, while 3,000 rolls were listed as due after the Satsuma invasion of Okinawa in 1609. As well as the payment of bolts of plain, striped and kasuri bashōfu as tribute to the Ryukyu Kingdom kings, the cloth was used in daily wear by commoners. Production increased in the Meiji period with the introduction of the takahata (高機) loom. After the Battle of Okinawa, production declined dramatically. Formerly made across the Ryūkyū islands, bashōfu production is now localized to Kijōka.

== Modern production ==
Bashō trees are stripped and, after sterilization, softened bast fibres are extracted and spun into weavable yarn; these are then woven to produce cloth that is lightweight, strong, and smooth to the touch. Approximately forty trees are required to make a standard roll of fabric. The colour of the bashō fibre forms the background; patterns are woven in indigo and brown. Designs include stripes, checks, and a number of types of kasuri.

== Cultural heritage ==
Kijōka-bashōfu was registered as an Important Intangible Cultural Property (重要無形文化財) in 1974, and the Kijōka-bashōfu Preservation Society (喜如嘉の芭蕉布保存会) was founded to help preserve the tradition. In 2000, practitioner of kijōka-bashōfu production Taira Toshiko (平良敏子) (1921–2022) was recognized as a Living National Treasure.

== See also ==
- Basho paper, Ryukyuan bashō paper
- Abacá, similar traditional fiber from the Philippines
- Important Intangible Cultural Properties of Japan
- National Treasures of Japan - Dyeing and weaving
- Representative List of the Intangible Cultural Heritage of Humanity
- List of Traditional Crafts of Japan
