= List of hardy gingers =

Hardy gingers are any of the species of gingers (Zingiberaceae) that are able to withstand brief periods of colder temperatures and even occasional snowfall.

- Alpinia galanga - Known as Thai ginger or Greater galangal, and is a cold hardy variety of ginger grown from zones 8.
- Alpinia japonica - Native to China, Japan, Taiwan and is a cold hardy variety of ginger grown from zones 8.
- Alpinia zerumbet - Shell ginger is native to East Asia and is a cold hardy variety of ginger grown from zones 8.
- Boesenbergia rotunda - Chinese ginger or lesser galangal is native to China and is a cold hardy variety of ginger grown from zones 8.
- Curcuma longa - Turmeric is native to southern Asia and is a cold hardy variety of ginger grown from zones 7/8.
- Hedychium coronarium - White Ginger is native to south and east Asia and is a cold hardy variety of ginger grown from zones 7.
- Kaempferia galanga - Sand ginger or black galangal is a cold hardy variety of ginger grown from zones 8.
- Roscoea auriculata - Native to eastern Himalayas, in Tibet, Bhutan, Nepal and Sikkim, and is a cold hardy variety of ginger grown from zones 6.
- Zingiber kawagoii - Taiwan ginger is native to Taiwan, and is a cold hardy variety of ginger grown from zones 7.
- Zingiber mioga - Japanese ginger is native to Japan, China, and Korea, and is a cold hardy variety of ginger grown from zones 6.
- Zingiber zerumbet - Shampoo ginger is native to Asia, and is a cold hardy variety of ginger grown from zones 8.

== See also ==
- List of hardy bananas
- List of hardy passionflowers
- List of cold hardy palms
