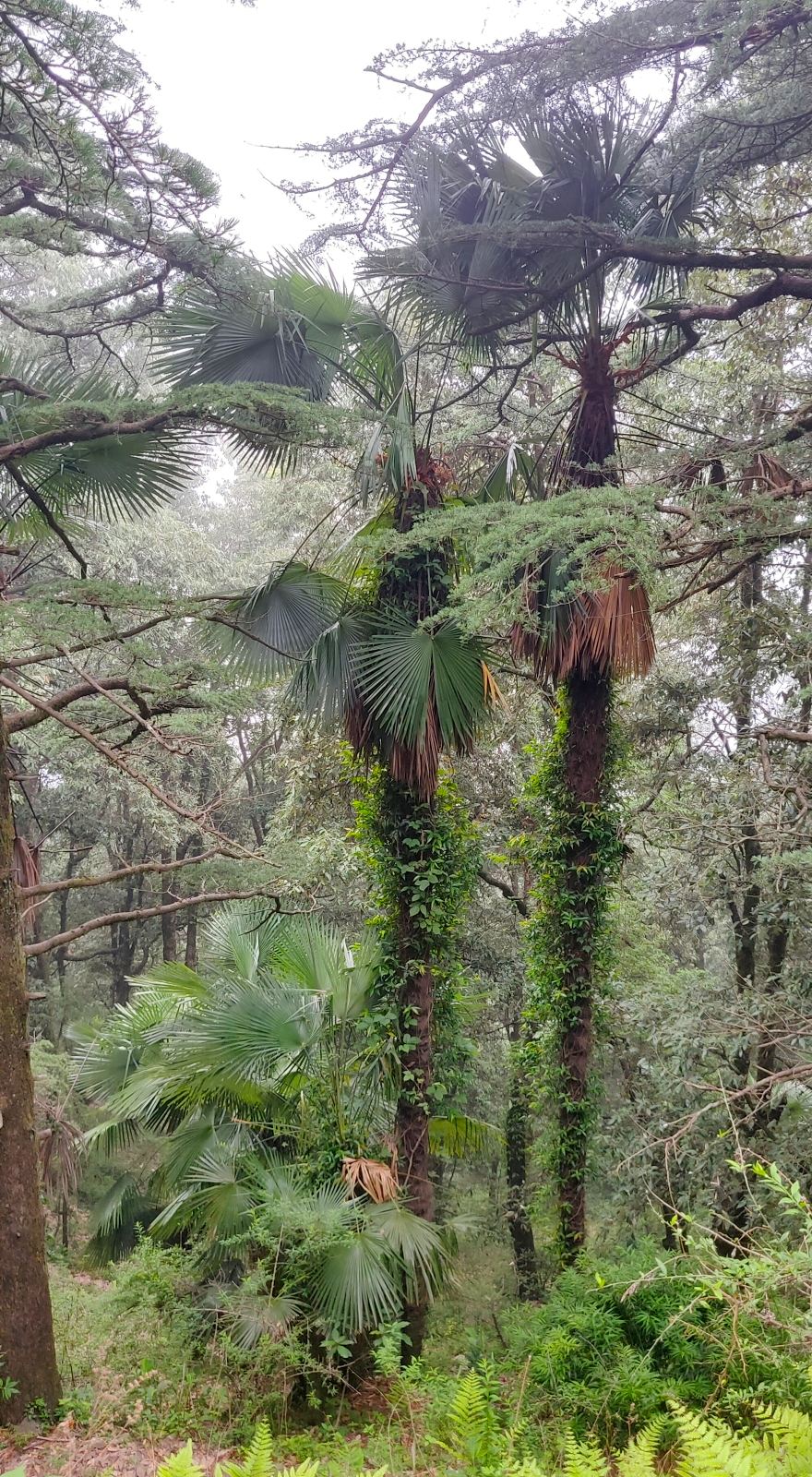
- Trachycarpus takil at Chakrata, Uttarakhand, India

Scientific classification
- Kingdom: Plantae
- Clade: Tracheophytes
- Clade: Angiosperms
- Clade: Monocots
- Clade: Commelinids
- Order: Arecales
- Family: Arecaceae
- Tribe: Trachycarpeae
- Genus: Trachycarpus
- Species: T. takil

Binomial name
- Trachycarpus takil Becc.

= Trachycarpus takil =

Species of palm

Trachycarpus takil, the Kumaon palm, is a fan palm that is endemic to the foothills of the Himalaya in southern Asia. It is very similar to Trachycarpus fortunei.

== Distribution ==
The palm tree is native to the Kumaon division of Uttarakhand Province in northwestern India, and into adjacent western Nepal. The palm grows at altitudes of 1,800–2,700 m (5,900–8,900 ft) and it receives snow and frost on a regular basis in its native habitat.

== Description ==
Trachycarpus takil grows to 10–15 metres (33–49 ft) tall, with a rough trunk covered in partial fibre from the old leaf bases as it sheds its fronds naturally leaving only a small part of the leaf bases on the trunk which also disappear in time.

Along with T. fortunei it is one of the cold hardiest palms to produce a tall trunk, tolerating temperatures from −14 to −20 °C (7 to −4 °F) and possibly more, though no official studies have been made. However, leaf damage or total defoliation due to extreme temperatures is a possibility.

It is easily distinguishable from Trachycarpus fortunei from its infancy by:

- the young plants having the tendency to growing obliquely
- the young trunk being distinctly conical
- the adult trunk covered with very tightly clasping (not ruffled) chestnut brown fibre
- the short, triangular, erect ligulas on the leaf sheaths of the terminal shoot
- the leaves more spreading and those of the previous year being placed just below the last flowering spadices, reflexed, although still alive, by the leaf blade being irregularly divided only down to about the middle
- the fruit being more distinctly uniform or considerably broader than high
- the first leaves of sprouting T. takil seeds are duplicate (having only two ridges differing from T. fortunei with its quadruplicate first leaves.)

== Taxonomy ==
Trachycarpus takil was first discovered by a Major Madden, a British Army colonel with a passion for botany stationed in the Himalayas during the 1840s. Unfortunately, while Madden produced precise descriptions of both the plant and location, he made the mistake of assuming it to be Trachycarpus martianus, failing to realize it was a separate species, thus losing the chance to claim its discovery. It was formally described by the Italian botanist Odoardo Beccari in 1905 in "Le Palme del Genere Trachycarpus" in Webbia 1: 52. The leaves naturally shed themselves, unlike Trachycarpus fortunei, leaving a semi bare trunk covered in fibre from the old leaf bases. Petioles about as long as the blade. Blade 3/4 orbicular, 1–1.2 m (3–4 ft) in diameter, irregularly divided down to about the middle into 45–50 segments, 60–85 cm (24–33 in) in length from the top of the petiole (hastula) to the apex of the median segments, the latter stiff and erect, not with drooping tips.

== Cultivation ==
Trachycarpus takil is cultivated as an ornamental tree, including use as a cold hardy outdoor palm in colder climates than most palms can survive in.

Some plants in cultivation in the United States under the name Trachycarpus takil may be misnamed specimens of the dwarf form of Trachycarpus fortunei, also known as "T. wagnerianus".

== See also ==
- Hardy palms
