= Trachycarpus ukhrulensis =

Scientific classification
- Kingdom: Plantae
- Clade: Tracheophytes
- Clade: Angiosperms
- Clade: Monocots
- Clade: Commelinids
- Order: Arecales
- Family: Arecaceae
- Tribe: Trachycarpeae
- Genus: Trachycarpus
- Species: T. ukhrulensis

Binomial name
- Trachycarpus ukhrulensis M.Lorek & K.C.Pradhan

Species of palm

Trachycarpus ukhrulensis is a plant species endemic to the Manipur region in Assam, India.
