= Trachycarpus latisectus =

Scientific classification
- Kingdom: Plantae
- Clade: Tracheophytes
- Clade: Angiosperms
- Clade: Monocots
- Clade: Commelinids
- Order: Arecales
- Family: Arecaceae
- Tribe: Trachycarpeae
- Genus: Trachycarpus
- Species: T. latisectus

Binomial name
- Trachycarpus latisectus T.W.Spanner, H.J.Noltie & M.Gibbons

Synonyms
- Trachycarpus martianus subsp. latisectus (Spanner, Noltie & Gibbons) M.Lorek

Species of palm

Trachycarpus latisectus (formerly Trachycarpus sikkimensis ined.) is an attractive palm tree with large leathery leaves with exceptionally wide segments and a thick, bare and ringed trunk. Its fan-shaped leaves resemble those of Livistona. It has a bare trunk and its seeds resemble those of T. martianus.

Trachycarpus latisectus is commonly known as Windamere palm, for the locality where its first botanical description was made, the garden of the famous Windamere Hotel in Darjeeling, India. It was formally photographed and collected for the first time only in 1992 during the Royal Botanic Garden Edinburgh Sikkim Expedition. It is considered a temperate palm, and has been reported to withstand a wide range of climates, from tropical, subtropical to cold and wet conditions. It is native to Sikkim in the Himalayas, where it has been reported from a range of elevation between 3500 and 7000 feet. It remains in the wild in just one tiny, heavily altered location which is immediately threatened by deforestation.

Trachycarpus latisectus is cultivated outside its native range as an ornamental. Seeds are considered very easy to germinate. They should be soaked for at least 12 hours, then placed in a mixture of moist peat with perlite or vermiculite within a plastic bag, and keep at 18 - 28 °C. Viable seeds will sprout in a time frame between two and ten months, depending on several factors. The tree grows quickly and easily. T. latisectus requires a rich and loamy but well-drained soil. Young plants are best grown under some shade. As it does not have an invasive root system, it also grows well in containers.
