= Trachycarpus oreophilus =

Scientific classification
- Kingdom: Plantae
- Clade: Tracheophytes
- Clade: Angiosperms
- Clade: Monocots
- Clade: Commelinids
- Order: Arecales
- Family: Arecaceae
- Tribe: Trachycarpeae
- Genus: Trachycarpus
- Species: T. oreophilus

Binomial name
- Trachycarpus oreophilus Gibbons & Spanner (1997)

Species of palm

Trachycarpus oreophilus, also known as Thai mountain fan palm, is a plant species in the genus Trachycarpus. It is known from two distinct populations, one in northwest Thailand, the other in Manipur in northeastern India. The Manipur population was formerly considered a separate species.

Trachycarpus oreophilus grows on steep mountain sides at elevations of 1,200–1,800 m (3,900–5,900 ft).
