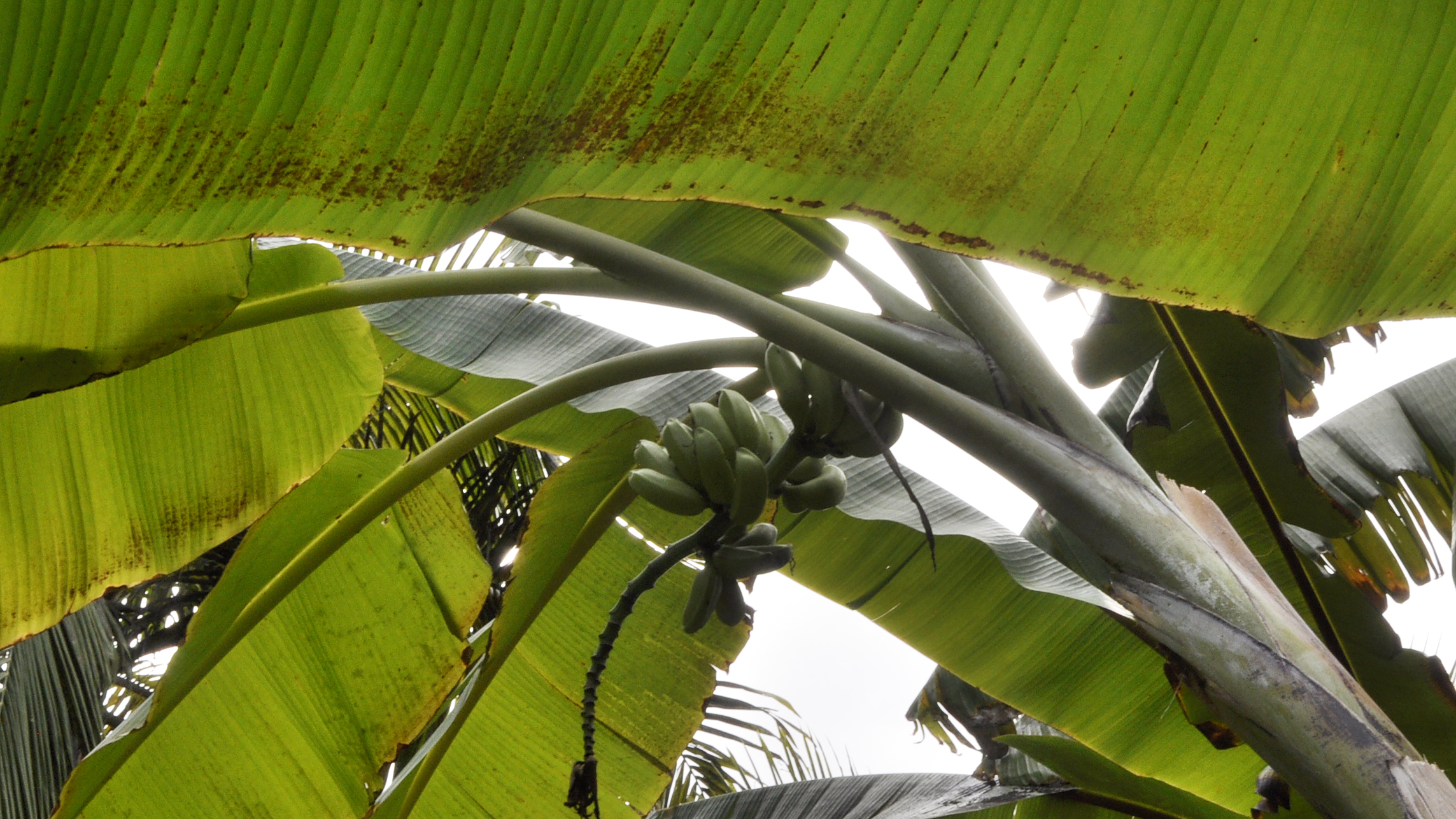

Conservation status
- Least Concern (IUCN 3.1)

Scientific classification
- Kingdom: Plantae
- Clade: Embryophytes
- Clade: Tracheophytes
- Clade: Spermatophytes
- Clade: Angiosperms
- Clade: Monocots
- Clade: Commelinids
- Order: Zingiberales
- Family: Musaceae
- Genus: Musa
- Section: Musa sect. Musa
- Species: M. itinerans

Binomial name
- Musa itinerans Cheesman

= Musa itinerans =

Species of flowering plant

Musa itinerans, the Yunnan banana, is a species of banana found in continental Southeast Asia from Northeast India to Vietnam. The tender inner stalk is also harvested and eaten. It is the landmark 24,200th plant species saved at Kew Gardens' Millennium Seed Bank Project. With this addition, the seed bank had collected 10% of the world's wild plant species. In China it is an important food for wild Asian elephants.

Musa itinerans is found in the Assam region of Northwest India, Bangladesh, Southeast and South-central China, the Hainan province of China, Laos, Myanmar, Taiwan, Thailand, Vietnam.

== Varieties ==
Musa itinerans has ten accepted infraspecifics:

- M. itinerans var. annamica
- M. itinerans var. chinensis
- M. itinerans var. chiumei
- M. itinerans var. formosana
- M. itinerans var. guangdongensis
- M. itinerans var. hainanensis
- M. itinerans var. itinerans
- M. itinerans var. kavalanensis
- M. itinerans var. lechangensis
- M. itinerans var. xishuangbannaensis

A form of the species described as Musa itinerans 'Sanmingyeshengjiao', can grow at 0°C and is thus useful for banana researchers studying cold tolerance.

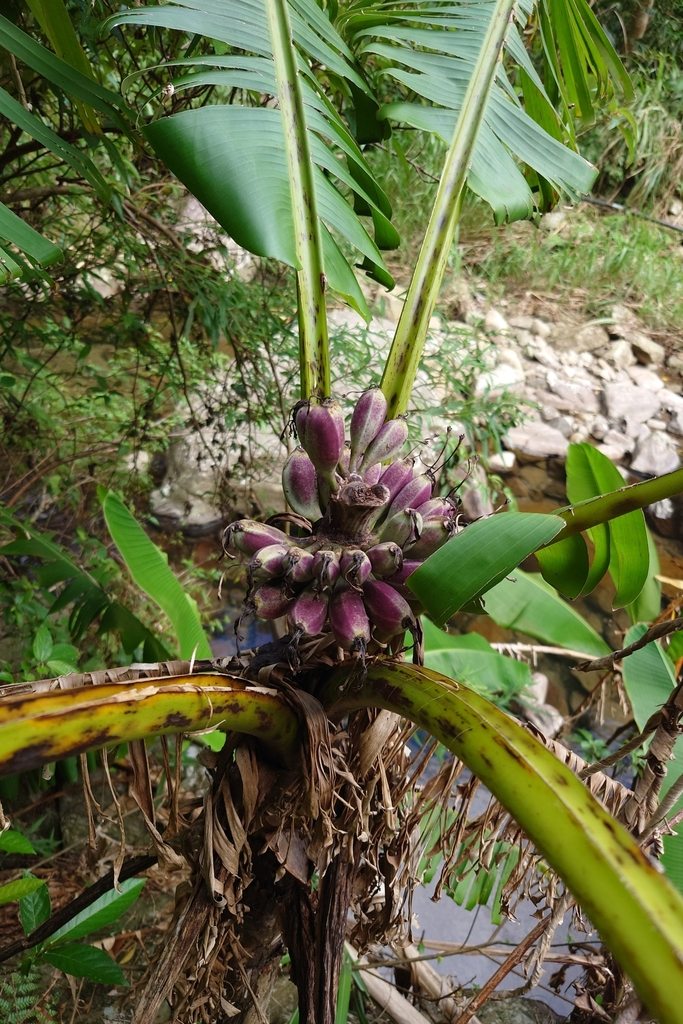
Musa itinerans var. chiumei

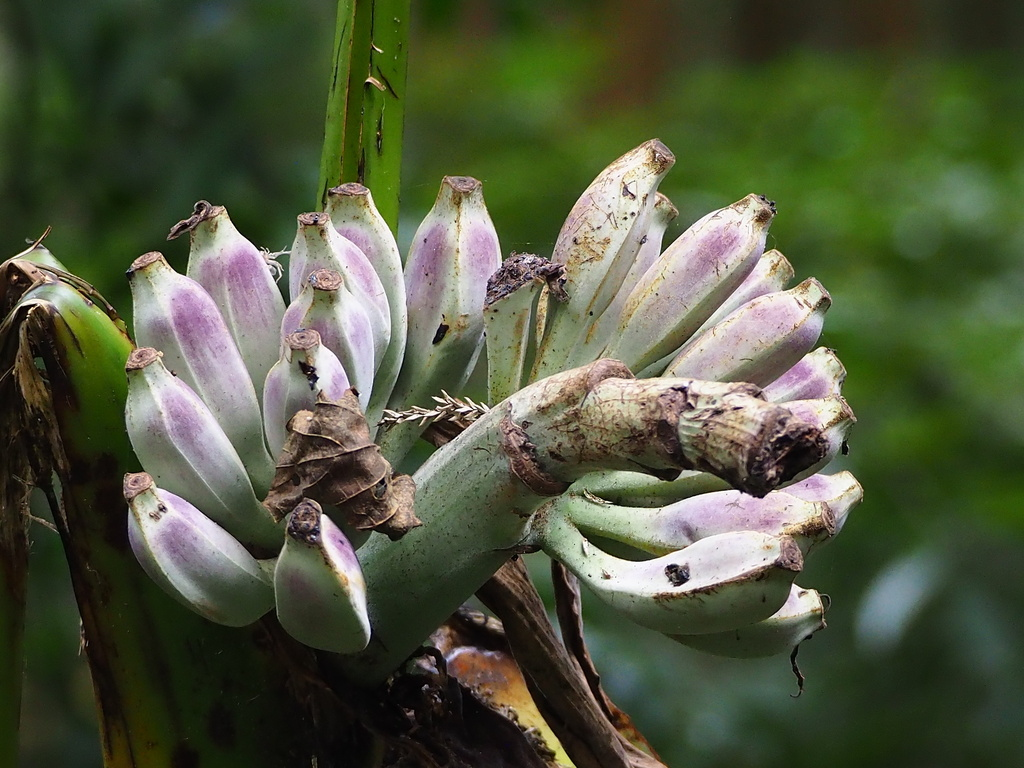
Musa itinerans var. formosana

== See also ==
- List of hardy bananas
