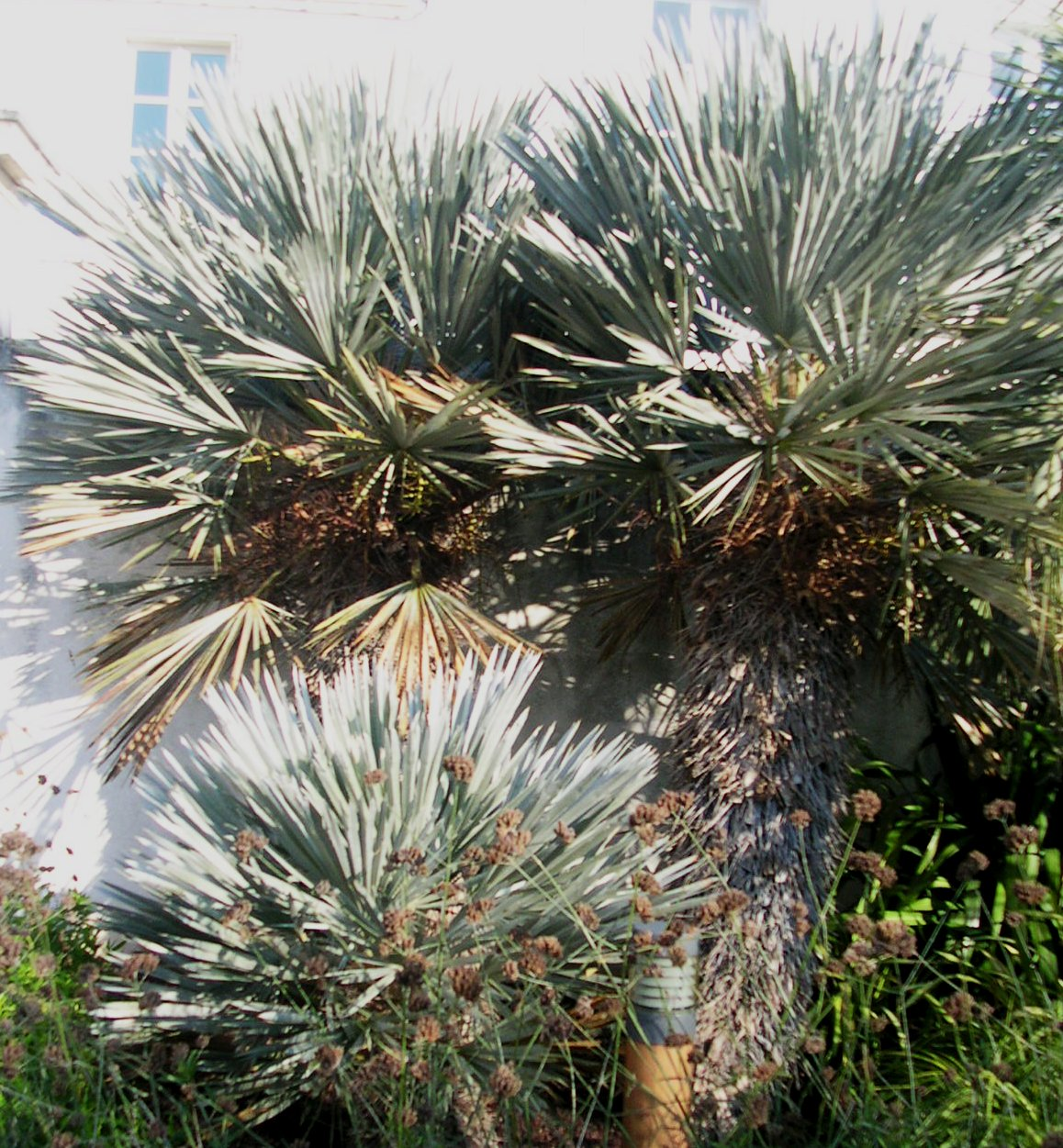
- Trithrinax campestris in a garden, grown as ornamental palm

Scientific classification
- Kingdom: Plantae
- Clade: Embryophytes
- Clade: Tracheophytes
- Clade: Spermatophytes
- Clade: Angiosperms
- Clade: Monocots
- Clade: Commelinids
- Order: Arecales
- Family: Arecaceae
- Genus: Trithrinax
- Species: T. campestris

Binomial name
- Trithrinax campestris (Burmeist.) Drude & Griseb.

Synonyms
- Copernicia campestris

= Trithrinax campestris =

Species of palm

Trithrinax campestris, the caranday palm, is a South American palm tree native of Uruguayan and northeastern Argentine sabanas, where it shares its habitat with Copernicia alba among others and extends also to the summits of mountain ranges of Sierras de Córdoba and Sierras de San Luis. It is a very rustic palm that grows in arid, well drained, rocky soils. Its distinctive features are its compact shape, short green to grayish foliage, and trunk fully hidden by dry dead leaf bases (coat) remaining from several previous seasons.

== Morphology ==
Trithrinax campestris is a monocot flowering palm of relative low height (up to 6 m tall) and 20–25 cm wide stems usually covered by fibrous-spiny remains of earlier foliage which acts as a thick protective coat. Caranday leaves are about 1 m long, palmate, rounded, with a very rigid and spiny petiole.

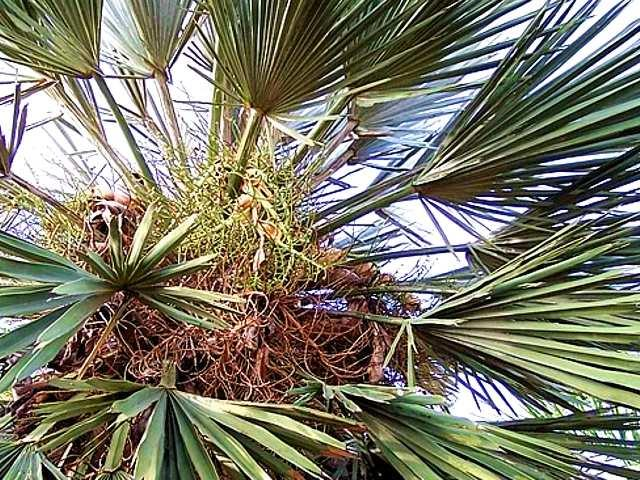
Trithrinax campestris foliage detail

The leaflet segments are rigid, dark green to a more blue hue, with light green undersides. These are possibly the toughest leaves among Arecaceae. As habitat altitude increases the foliage becomes more grayish, this is typical of mountain carandays. Flowers compose highly branched inflorescences located at the base of the lower living leaves. These contain up to 100 white hermaphrodite flowers 10 to 12 mm wide. This palm flowers in autumn. Fruits ripen towards the end of the next summer. They consist of subspherical yellow brownish drupes, 1 to 2 cm wide, with a thin fleshy mesocarp and a fibrous endocarp. Caranday is monoecious, a feature common to the conifers but rare in angiosperms.

== Habitat ==
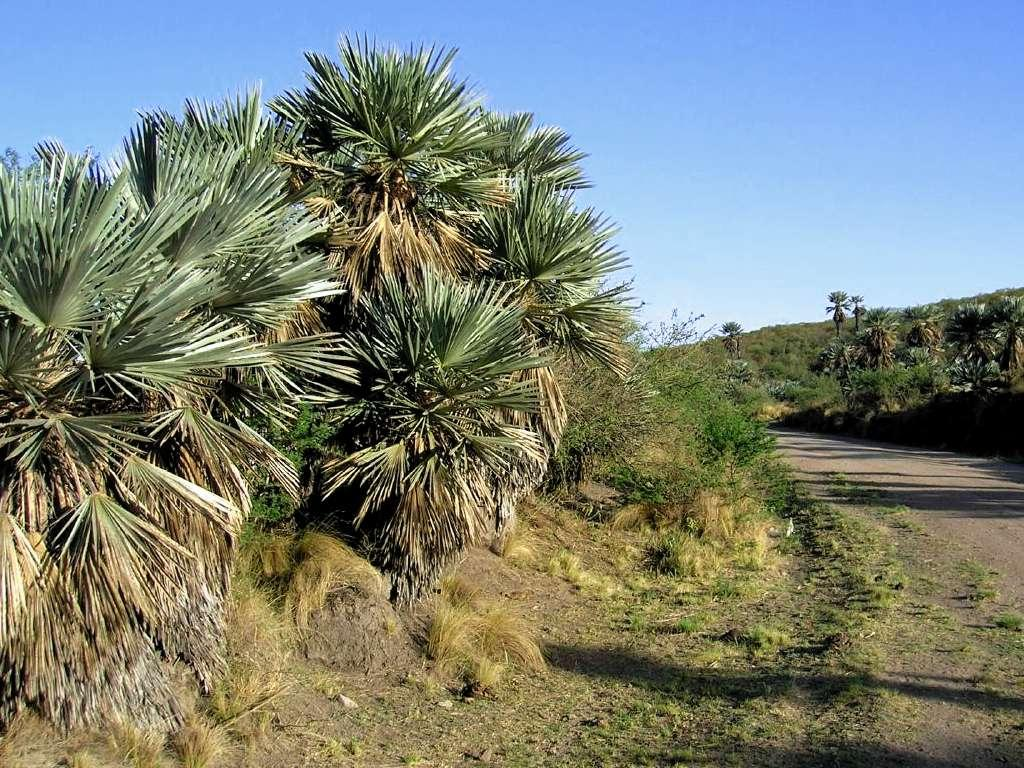
Trithrinax campestris formation at Pampa de Pocho, Argentina

Trithrinax campestris prefers well drained, sandy or rocky soils (although it is resistant to extended persistent flooding). It is very resistant to drought, and -9 °C/-15 °C temperatures when not in growing season, although it tends to shed its leaves in these conditions. It is one of the most cold-hardy palms in the world, because it also grows in the mountains of Sierras de Córdoba and Sierras de San Luis; it is known that specimens growing at those elevations tolerate special cold conditions. It has thrived as far north as the British Isles. Seeds germinate quickly, but later growth is mostly slow.

These palms are naturally found in groups, formations of several individuals, or composing large caranday forests where they present strong dominance. Its main environmental threat is deforestation or natural fire, as caranday's thick dry stem coats are highly flammable.

== Usage ==
Leaves are rich in strong fiber, very resistant to tension. It is extracted to manufacture crafts such as hats, shoes and fans. Whole leaves are cut and used as rudimentary brushes. Fruits are not eaten, however, an alcoholic beverage is prepared locally through their fermentation. Caranday palms are also appreciated and grown worldwide as an easy to keep, cold weather and drought resistant, ornamental small palm. It is besides a good honey-producing plant
