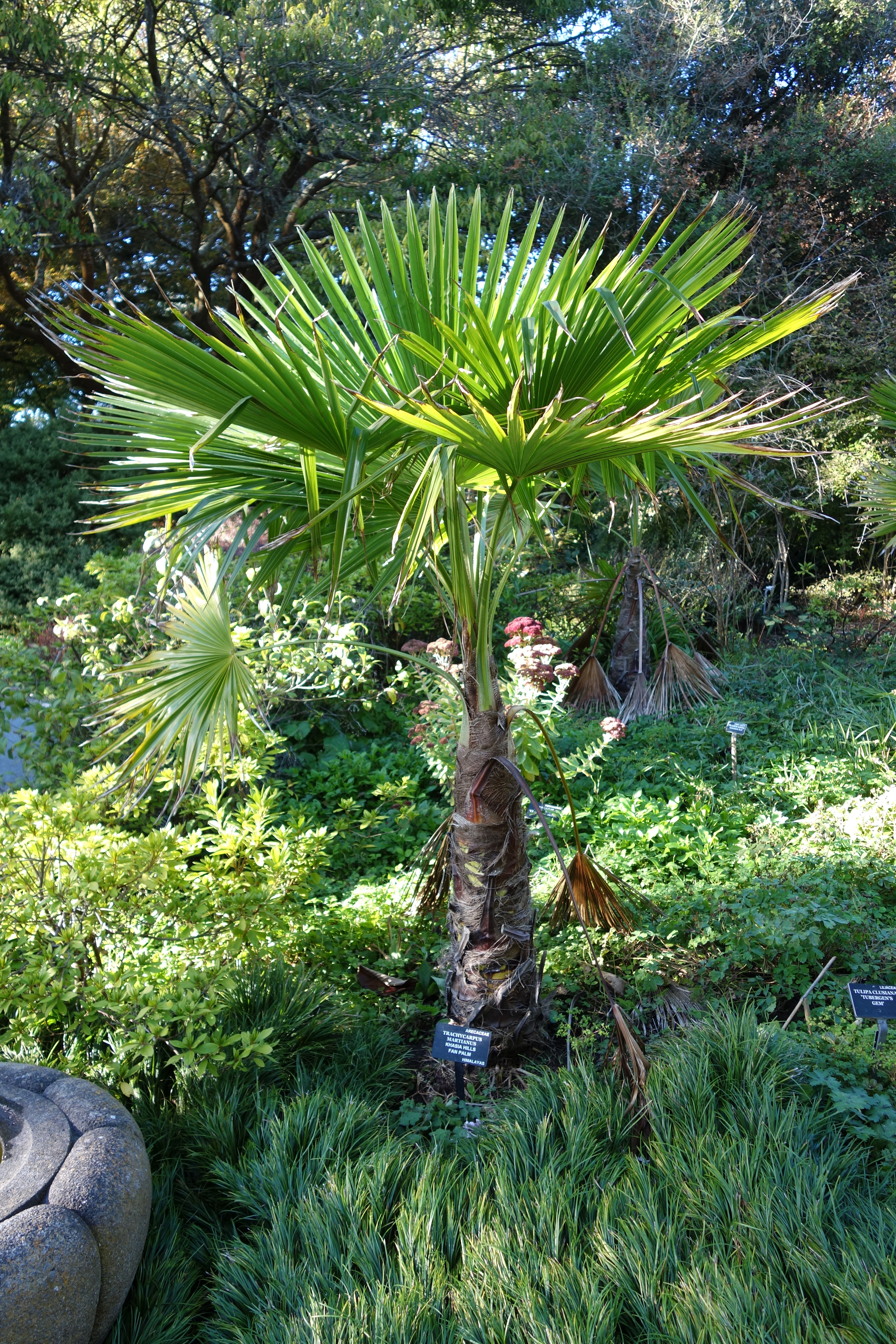

Scientific classification
- Kingdom: Plantae
- Clade: Tracheophytes
- Clade: Angiosperms
- Clade: Monocots
- Clade: Commelinids
- Order: Arecales
- Family: Arecaceae
- Tribe: Trachycarpeae
- Genus: Trachycarpus
- Species: T. martianus

Binomial name
- Trachycarpus martianus (Wall. ex Mart.) H.Wendl.

Synonyms
- Chamaerops martiana Wall. ex Mart. in N.Wallich; Chamaerops nepalensis Lodd. ex Schult. & Schult.f.; Chamaerops khasyana Griff.; Chamaerops tomentosa C.Morren; Trachycarpus khasyanus (Griff.) H.Wendl.; Chamaerops griffithii Lodd. ex Verl.; Trachycarpus griffithii (Lodd. ex Verl.) auct.; Trachycarpus martianus subsp. khasyana (Griff.) M.Lorek

= Trachycarpus martianus =

Species of palm

Trachycarpus martianus (also known as Martius' fan palm) is a tree in the family Arecaceae. There are two distinct populations: one at 1,500 m (5,000 ft) in the Khasia Hills of Meghalaya state, in northeast India, the other at 2,400 m (8,000 ft) in central northern Nepal. Other populations have been reported in Assam, Sikkim, Burma and southern China. The main identifying characteristics are the regular leaf splits (to about halfway), the coffee-bean-shaped seeds (similar looking to Trachycarpus latisectus) and the bare, as opposed to fibrous trunk. The new leaf spear and edges of the petioles are covered with a white tomentum.

The species is named after the German botanist Carl Friedrich Philipp von Martius (1794-1868).

It is used in making Jhapi, a traditional head cover often used to felicitate guests in Assam.
