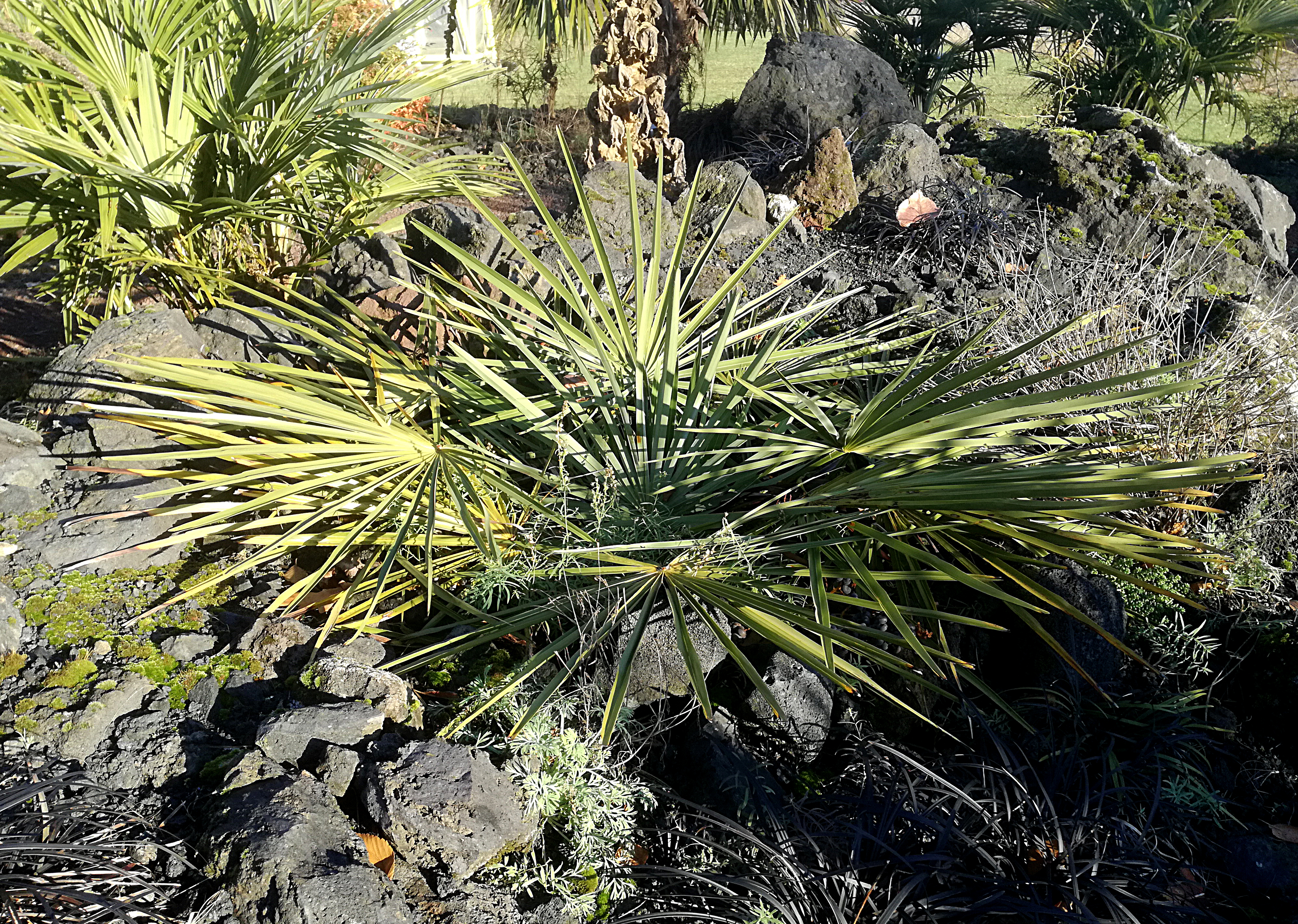

Conservation status
- Endangered (IUCN 3.1)

Scientific classification
- Kingdom: Plantae
- Clade: Tracheophytes
- Clade: Angiosperms
- Clade: Monocots
- Clade: Commelinids
- Order: Arecales
- Family: Arecaceae
- Tribe: Trachycarpeae
- Genus: Trachycarpus
- Species: T. nanus

Binomial name
- Trachycarpus nanus Becc.

= Trachycarpus nanus =

Species of palm

Trachycarpus nanus is a species of flowering plant in the family Arecaceae. It is found only in China. Its natural habitat is subtropical or tropical moist lowland forests. It is threatened by habitat loss.
