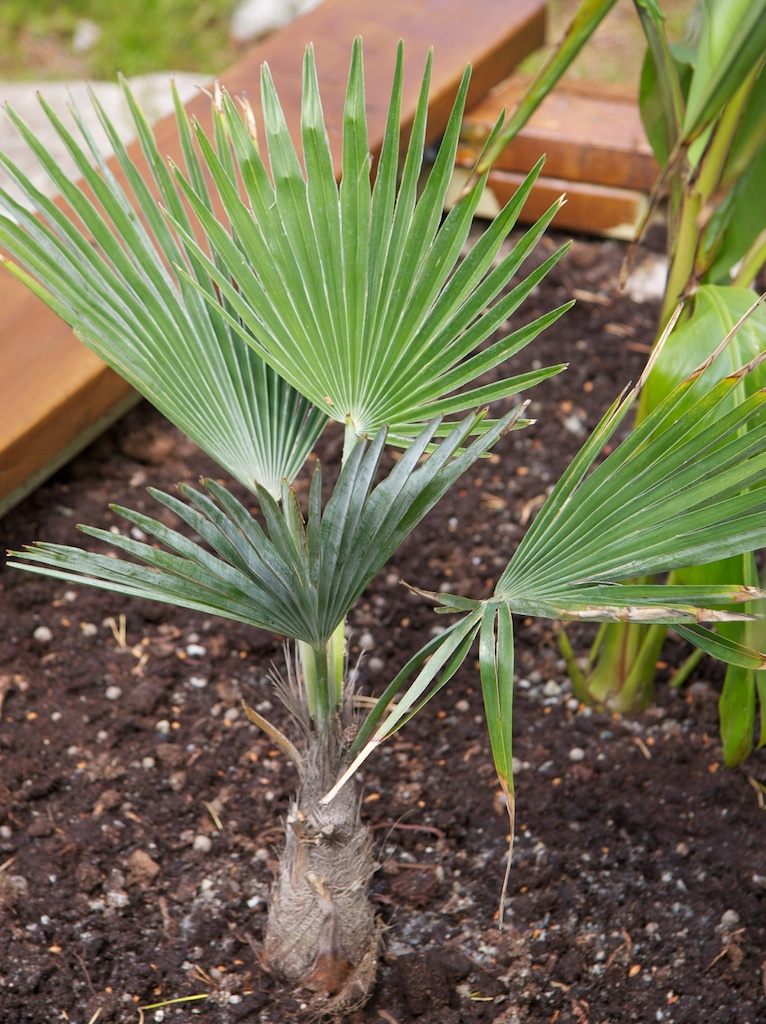

Scientific classification
- Kingdom: Plantae
- Clade: Tracheophytes
- Clade: Angiosperms
- Clade: Monocots
- Clade: Commelinids
- Order: Arecales
- Family: Arecaceae
- Tribe: Trachycarpeae
- Genus: Trachycarpus
- Species: T. princeps

Binomial name
- Trachycarpus princeps Gibbons, Spanner & San Y. Chen

= Trachycarpus princeps =

Species of palm

Trachycarpus princeps is a species of palm endemic to Yunnan in southern central China. It grows on limestone cliffs and ridge tops in monsoonal rain forest in the Salween River valley at elevations of 1,500–1,900 metres (4,900–6,200 ft). The epithet is Latin for "prince" and alludes to "the stately bearing of this palm and the majestic way it looks down from its lofty position on the sheer cliff faces" (Gibbons 1993). The species was described in 1995 by Gibbons, Spanner & Chen.

The trunk grows to 10 metres (33 ft) high with a diameter of 13–16 centimetres (5.1–6.3 in), and is covered in dense fibres in all but its oldest parts. The leaves are semicircular, 0.9–1.2 metres (2 ft 11 in – 3 ft 11 in) diameter, with 45–48 linear-lanceolate segments that extend halfway into the depth of the blade, which is bright medium green above and glaucous, bluish-white beneath. The fruit is a blackish drupe 1 centimetre (0.39 in) long with a pale waxy bloom.
