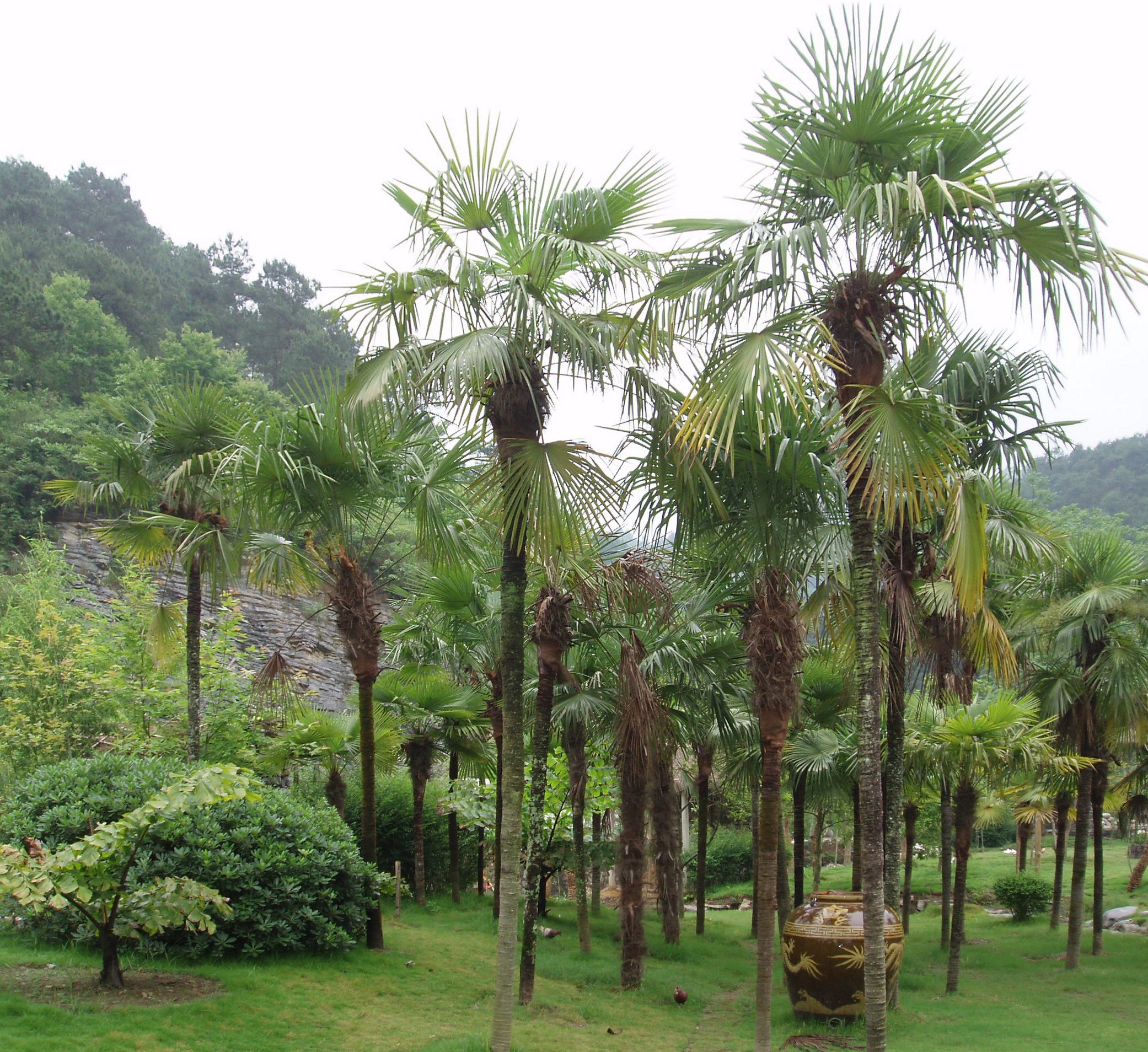
- Trachycarpus fortunei in China

Scientific classification
- Kingdom: Plantae
- Clade: Tracheophytes
- Clade: Angiosperms
- Clade: Monocots
- Clade: Commelinids
- Order: Arecales
- Family: Arecaceae
- Subfamily: Coryphoideae
- Tribe: Trachycarpeae
- Genus: Trachycarpus; H.Wendl.

Species
- Trachycarpus fortunei Trachycarpus geminisectus Trachycarpus latisectus Trachycarpus martianus Trachycarpus nanus Trachycarpus oreophilus Trachycarpus princeps Trachycarpus ravenii Trachycarpus takil Trachycarpus ukhrulensis

= Trachycarpus =

Genus of palms

Trachycarpus, from Ancient Greek τραχύς (trakhús), meaning "rough", and καρπός (karpós), meaning "fruit", is a genus of ten species of palms native to Asia, from the Himalaya east to eastern China. They are fan palms (subfamily Coryphoideae), with the leaves with a bare petiole terminating in a rounded fan of numerous leaflets. The leaf bases produce persistent fibres that often give the trunk a characteristic hairy appearance. All species are dioecious, with male and female flowers produced on separate plants although female plants will sometimes produce male flowers, allowing occasional self-pollination.

== Cultivation and uses ==
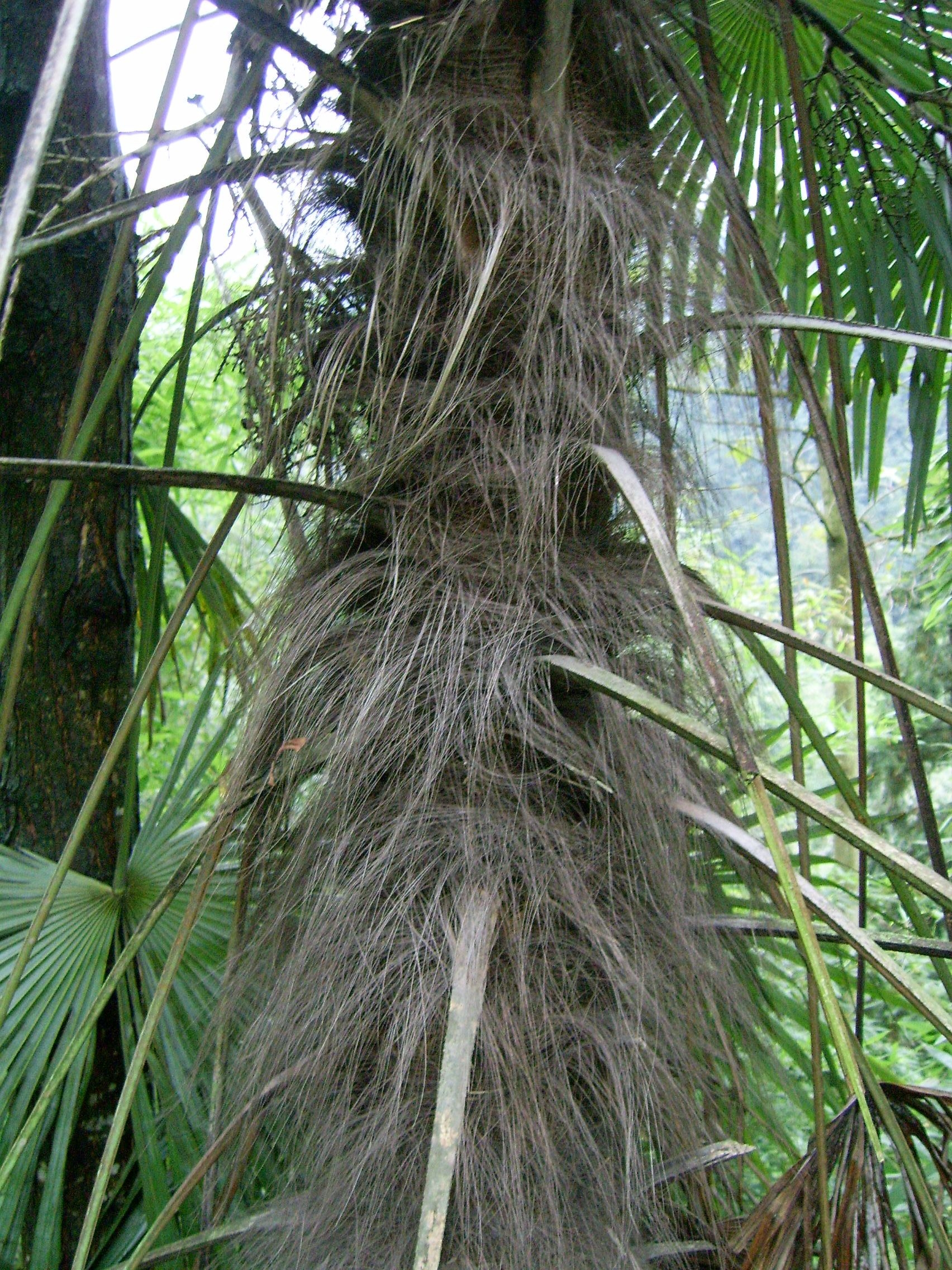
Stem of Trachycarpus fortunei showing leaf base fibres

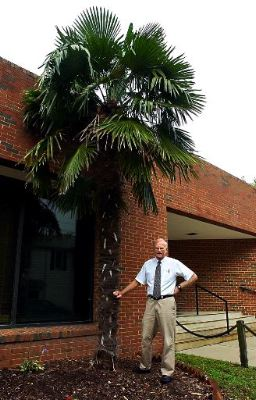
Mature Trachycarpus fortunei in Solomons, Maryland

The most common species in cultivation is Trachycarpus fortunei (Chusan palm or windmill palm), which is the northernmost naturally-growing palm species in the world. Cities as far north as London, Dublin, Paris, Seattle and Vancouver have long term cultivated palms in several areas. The dwarf form, known as T. wagnerianus, is unknown in the wild, and is now considered synonymous with T. fortunei or treated as a cultivar of that species. It resembles T. fortunei closely, differing only in its smaller and stiffer leaves. Hybrids between the two are intermediate in size and fully fertile.

Trachycarpus takil (the Kumaon palm) is similar to T. fortunei and probably even hardier. Other species less common in cultivation are T. geminisectus, T. princeps, T. latisectus, T. martianus, T. nanus and T. oreophilus. Trachycarpus martianus and T. latisectus do not tolerate cold as well as T. fortunei or T. takil. Trachycarpus geminisectus, T. princeps and T. oreophilus are still too rare and small in cultivation to assess their full potential. Two additional species have been described recently: Trachycarpus ukhrulensis from Manipur and T. ravenii from Laos; the former is known from cultivation as Trachycarpus sp. "Manipur" or Trachycarpus sp. "Naga Hills".

The trunk fibres produced by the leaf sheaths of Trachycarpus fortunei are harvested in China and elsewhere to make coarse but very strong rope, brooms and brushes. This use gives rise to the old alternative name "hemp-palm". The fibrous leaf sheaths are also frequently used to clothe the stems of artificial palms.

This genus is very popular among palm enthusiasts for its ability to withstand cold, especially in the form of damp, cool summer weather with relatively mild winter weather. These palms often tolerate snow in their native habitats and are the hardiest trunking palms.

Trachycarpus species are used as food plants by the larvae of some Lepidoptera species including Paysandisia archon (recorded on T. fortunei).

== Species ==
As of January 2025, the genus Trachycarpus comprises 10 accepted species.

| Image | Scientific name | Height | Distribution |
|---|---|---|---|
| | Trachycarpus fortunei | 10–13 metres (33–43 ft) | China, Japan, Myanmar and India. |
| | Trachycarpus geminisectus | 1–2 metres (3.3–6.6 ft) | Northern Vietnam (and potentially border regions of Guangxi, China) |
| | Trachycarpus latisectus | 12 metres (39 ft) | Sikkim |
| | Trachycarpus martianus | | Assam, China South-Central, East Himalaya, Myanmar, Nepal. |
| | Trachycarpus nanus | 0.9 metres (3.0 ft) | China. |
| | Trachycarpus oreophilus | 9 metres (30 ft) | Northwest Thailand, the other in Manipur in northeastern India |
| | Trachycarpus princeps | 9 metres (30 ft) | Yunnan in southern central China |
| | Trachycarpus ravenii | 6 metres (20 ft) | Laos |
| | Trachycarpus takil | 10–15 metres (33–49 ft) | Northwestern India, and into adjacent western Nepal |
| | Trachycarpus ukhrulensis | 15 metres (49 ft) | Manipur region in Assam, India. |

== Bibliography ==
- Beccari, O. (1931). Asiatic Palms - Corypheae (ed. U. Martelli). Ann. Roy. Bot. Gard. (Calcutta) 13: 1-356.
- Kimnach, M. (1977). The Species of Trachycarpus. Principes 21: 155-160.
- Meerow, A. W. (2005). Betrock's Cold Hardy Palms. Betrock Information Systems, Inc., Hollywood, Florida.
