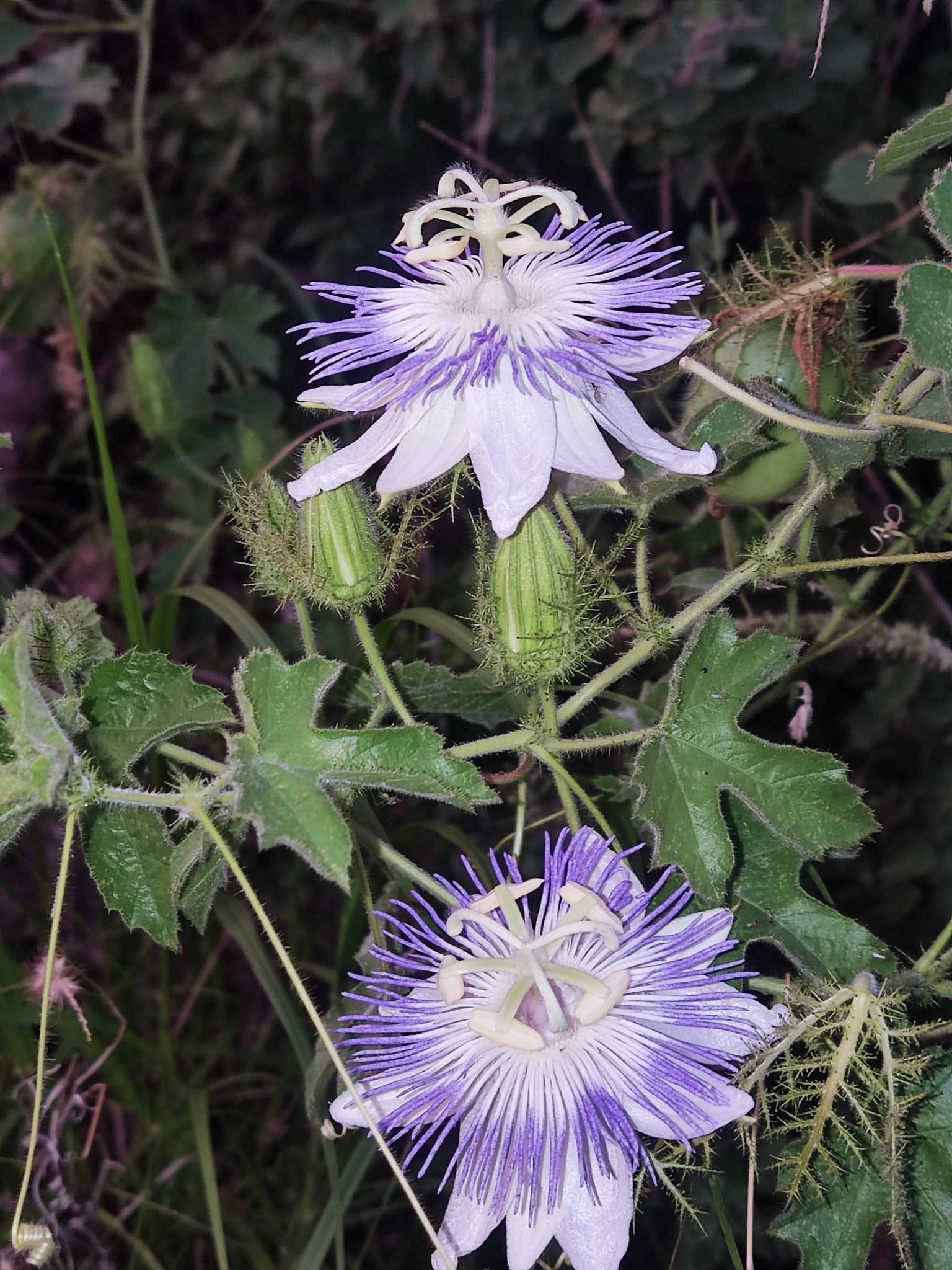

Scientific classification
- Kingdom: Plantae
- Clade: Tracheophytes
- Clade: Angiosperms
- Clade: Eudicots
- Clade: Rosids
- Order: Malpighiales
- Family: Passifloraceae
- Genus: Passiflora
- Species: P. arizonica

Binomial name
- Passiflora arizonica (Killip) D.H. Goldman

= Passiflora arizonica =

Species of flowering plant

Passiflora arizonica, commonly known as the Arizona passionflower, is a species of flowering plant in the genus Passiflora. It is a perennial climbing vine. It is native to the Sonoran Desert in northwestern Mexico and southern Arizona. It has showy white-purple flowers and grows in desert grasslands.
