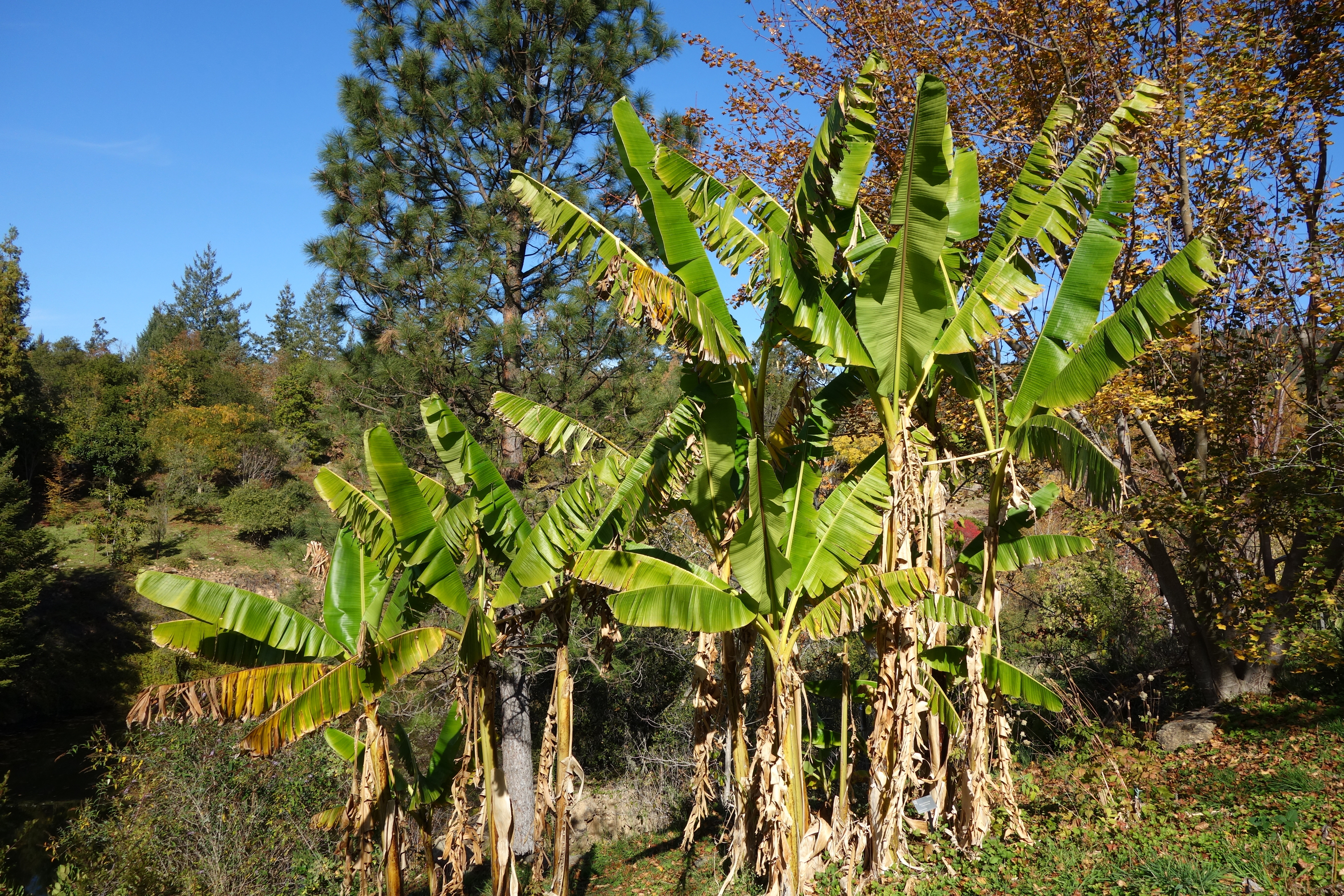
- Musa sikkimensis in the Quarryhill Botanical Garden

Conservation status
- Least Concern (IUCN 3.1)

Scientific classification
- Kingdom: Plantae
- Clade: Embryophytes
- Clade: Tracheophytes
- Clade: Spermatophytes
- Clade: Angiosperms
- Clade: Monocots
- Clade: Commelinids
- Order: Zingiberales
- Family: Musaceae
- Genus: Musa
- Section: Musa sect. Musa
- Species: M. sikkimensis

Binomial name
- Musa sikkimensis Kurz

= Musa sikkimensis =

Species of banana

Musa sikkimensis (also called the Darjeeling banana) is a species of flowering plant in the Musaceae (or banana) plant family. In a west-to-east direction, its native range extends from the state of Sikkim in India, through the east Himalayan region, into northern Myanmar. Musa sikkimensis is considered to be native to India, Bhutan, Nepal, Bangladesh and Myanmar.

Musa sikkimensis is named after the mountainous northeastern Indian state of Sikkim, as the species grows at some of the highest known elevations of any banana; for example, in Yuksom, West Sikkim, the species has been noted as growing at roughly 1780 metres (5,840 feet) above sea level.

== Description ==
The plant is robust and about 4 m tall with a yellowish-green foliage and reddish tinged pseudostem. The sheath is smudged with blackish-brown and is without wax when mature, unlike Musa nagensium which has thick wax deposits in the pseudostem sheaths. The bases of the lamina bear a red-purple colour when young, which gradually fades, latest on the midrib. The inflorescence far outshoots the pseudostem, producing an oblique fruit bunch. The fruits are described as lax, arising from large, brown callosities on axis, angled at maturity. The pulp is scanty, dirty white to pale brownish-pink. Flowering and fruiting takes place from October to April.

== Known cultivars and hybrids ==
- Musa sikkimensis 'Bengal Tiger'
- Musa sikkimensis 'Ever Red'
- Musa sikkimensis 'Manipur Massive'
- Musa sikkimensis 'Red Tiger'
- Musa sikkimensis × Musa × paradisiaca 'Helen's Hybrid'
- Musa sikkimensis × Musa balbisiana 'Daijao'
