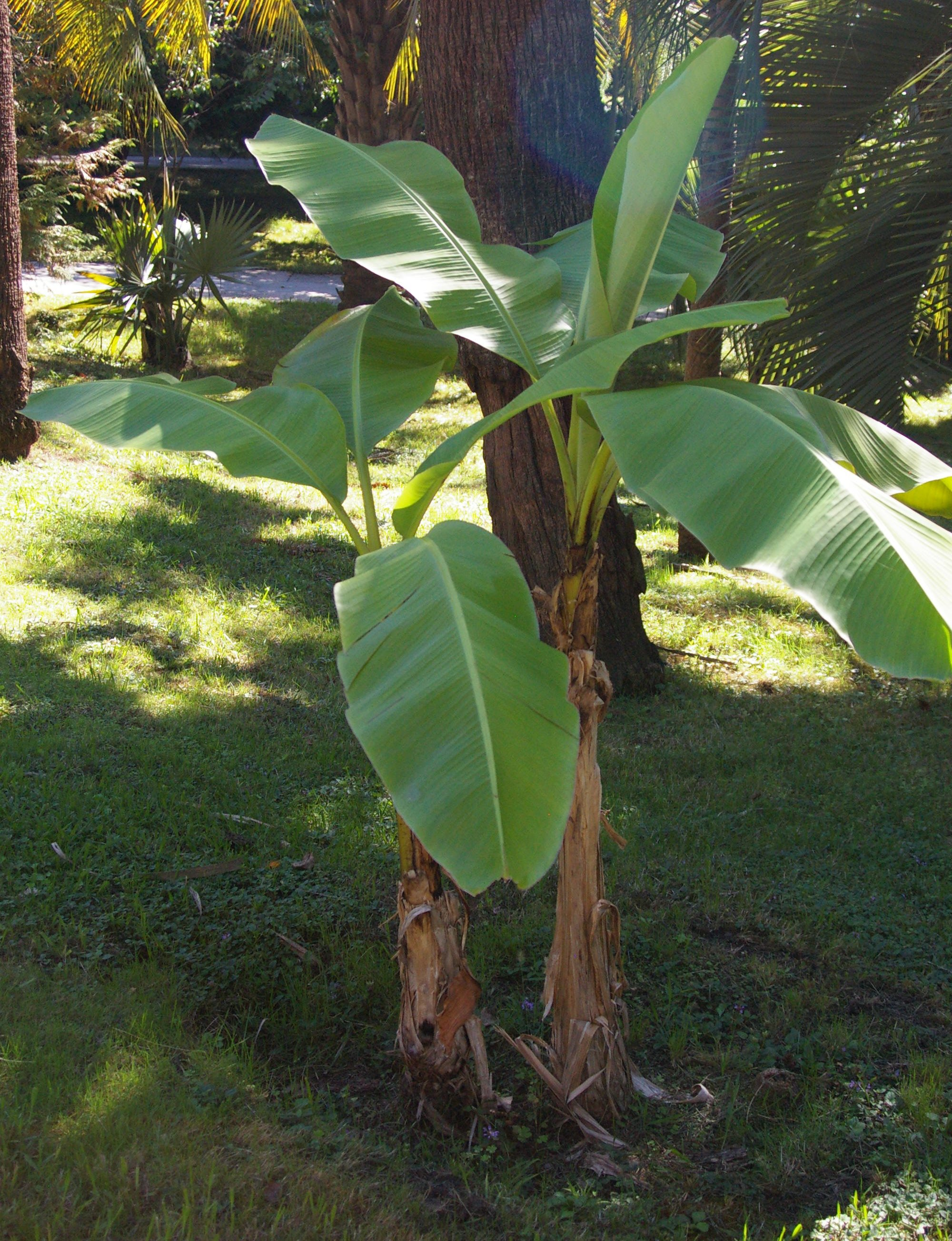

Conservation status
- Least Concern (IUCN 3.1)

Scientific classification
- Kingdom: Plantae
- Clade: Embryophytes
- Clade: Tracheophytes
- Clade: Spermatophytes
- Clade: Angiosperms
- Clade: Monocots
- Clade: Commelinids
- Order: Zingiberales
- Family: Musaceae
- Genus: Musa
- Section: Musa sect. Musa
- Species: M. basjoo

Binomial name
- Musa basjoo Siebold & Zucc. ex Iinuma

= Musa basjoo =

Hardy banana

Species of flowering plant

Musa basjoo, known variously as Japanese banana, Japanese fiber banana or hardy banana, is a species of flowering plant belonging to the banana family Musaceae. It was previously thought to have originated in the Ryukyu Islands of Japan, from where it was first described in cultivation, but is now known to have originated in the subtropical southern Chinese province of Sichuan. Its specific name is derived from its Japanese common name, bashō (芭蕉).

== Description ==
Musa basjoo is a herbaceous perennial with trunklike pseudostems (Note: A pseudostem is a false stem formed by the rolled bases of leaves.) growing to around 2–2.5 m (6.6–8.2 ft), with a crown of mid-green leaves growing up to 2 m (6.6 ft) long and 70 cm (28 in) wide when mature. The species produces male and female flowers on the same inflorescence which may extend for over 1 m (3.3 ft). The banana fruit formed are yellow-green, around 5–10 cm (2.0–3.9 in) long and 2–3 cm (0.79–1.18 in) broad; they are inedible, with sparse white pulp and many black seeds.

== Uses ==
=== Cultivation ===
Musa basjoo has been cultivated both for its fibers and as an ornamental plant in gardens outside its natural range, first in Japan, and then from the late 19th century in the warmer parts of western and central Europe (north of the United Kingdom), the United States, and southern Canada. In gardens, it is used as a hardy tropical foliage plant. Although the pseudostem may only cope with a few degrees below freezing, the underground rhizome is considered frost hardy, if well insulated with thick mulch, in areas with winter temperatures down to −12 °C (10 °F) and potentially lower if properly mulched. The roots are considered hardy to −10 °C (14 °F). If the pseudostem is killed, the banana will resprout from the ground where it rapidly grows to full size in a season under optimal conditions. Thus, it can be grown as far north as USDA zone 6a. It can also be overwintered under cover in a pot and kept growing, which is the only way it can be made to fruit in northern regions as it requires 12–24 months of warmth to bloom.

In the UK, it has gained the Royal Horticultural Society's Award of Garden Merit.

=== Fiber ===
In Japan, Musa basjoo plant fibers are used to produce textiles known in Japanese as kijōka-bashōfu (bashōfu (芭蕉布, "banana cloth)). Whole pseudostems are cut into strips up to 3 meters (9.8 ft) long. These are beaten, bleached and dried to produce the raw material, which can then be made into products such as carpets, tablecloths, kimono and banana paper.

=== Traditional medicine ===
In traditional Chinese medicine, the stem, flower, leaves and rhizome of Musa basjoo are considered useful for clearing heat-toxins, quenching thirst and disinhibiting urine.

=== Culture ===
The 17th-century Japanese poet Matsuo Bashō took his pen name from this plant.

== Gallery ==
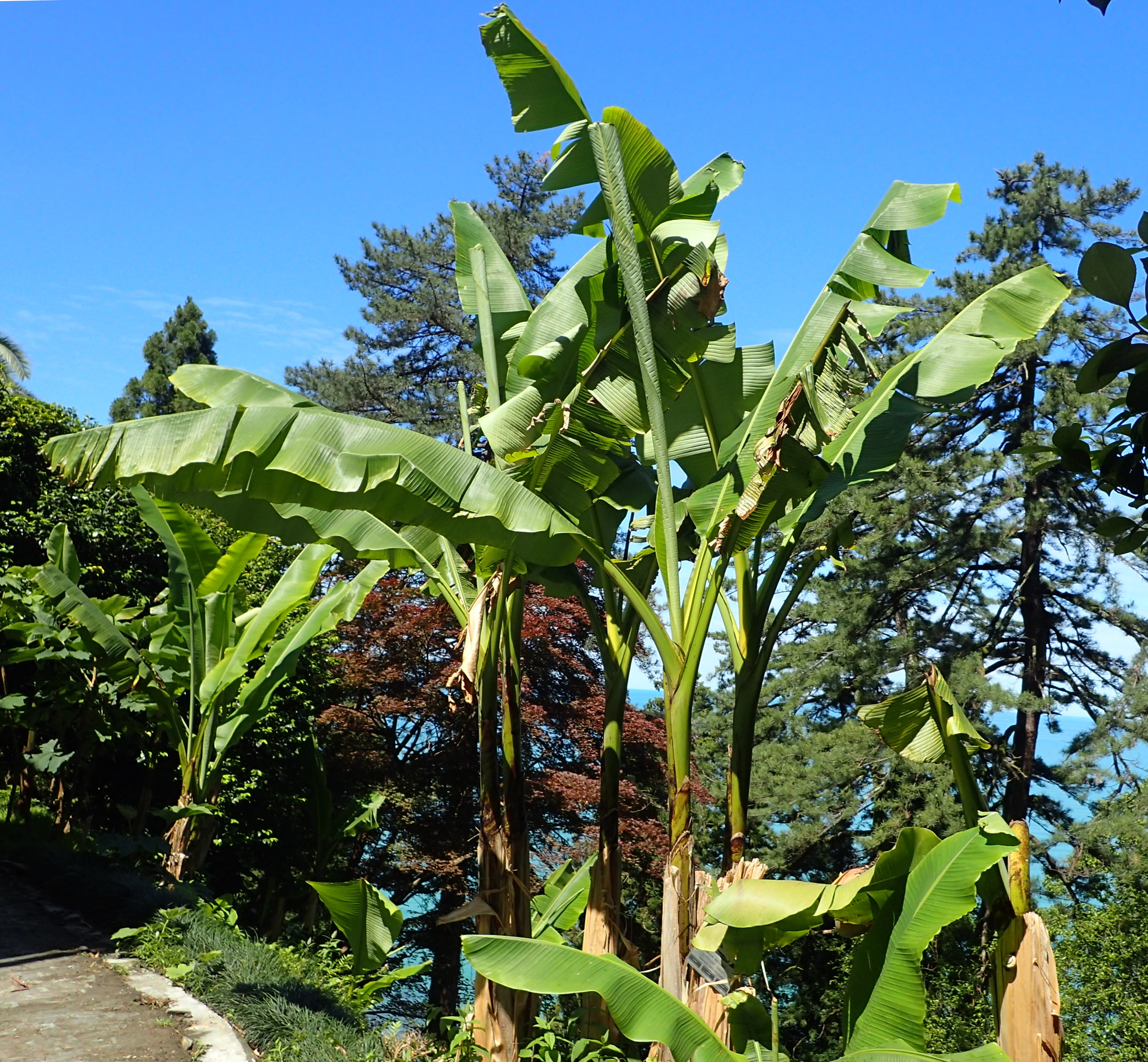
Plants in Batumi.

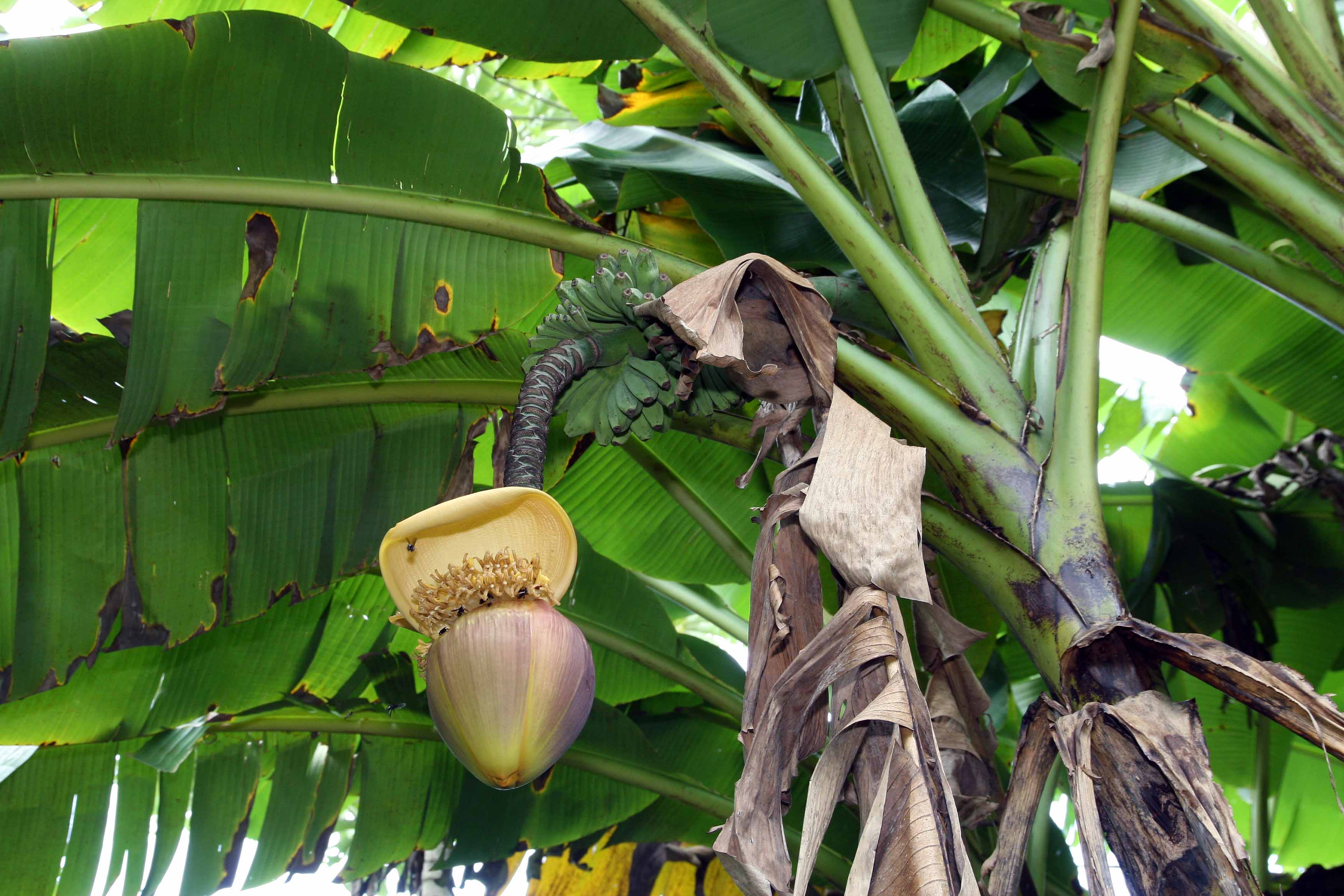
Unripe fruit and flower

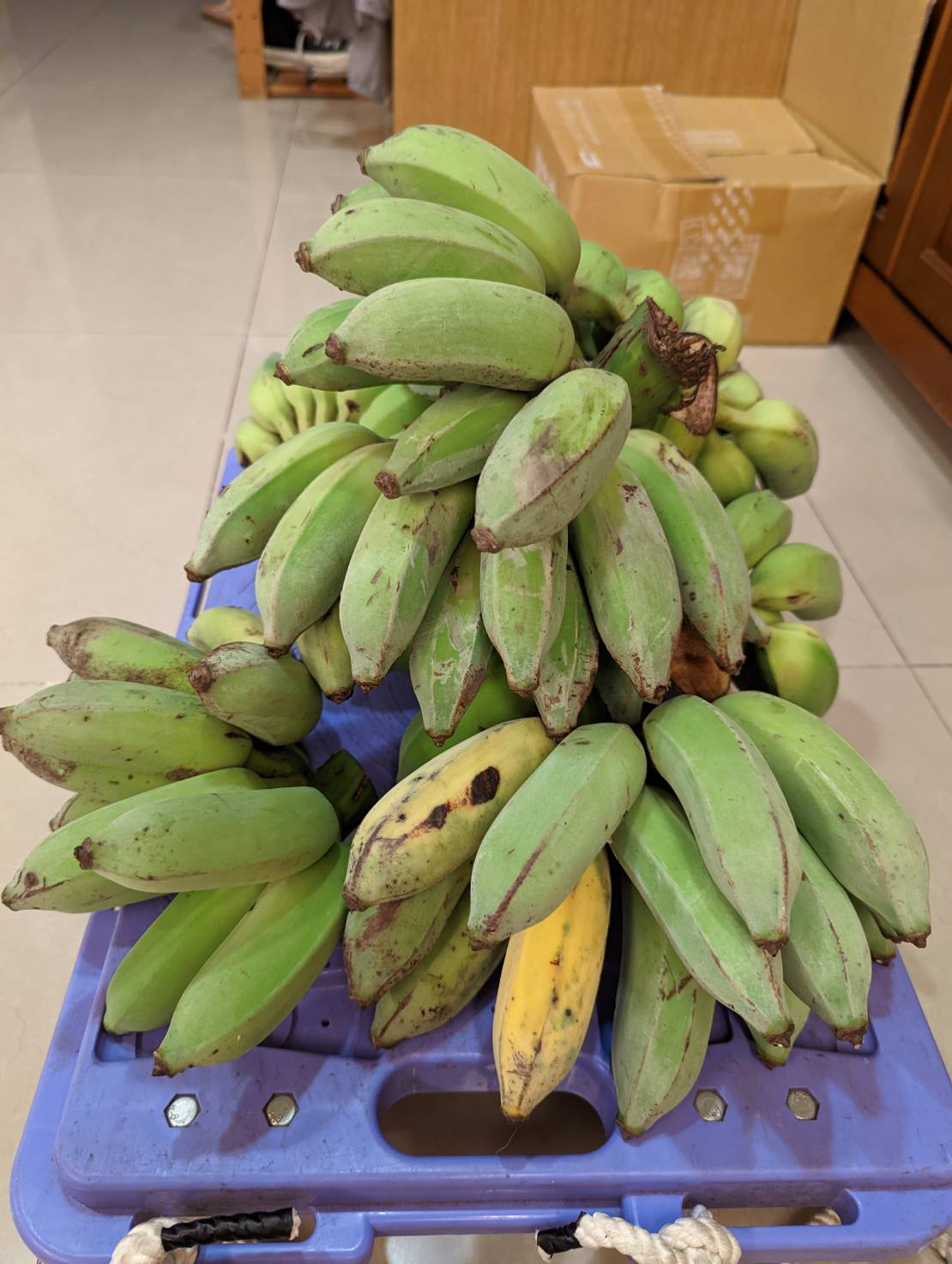
The fruit

== See also ==
- List of hardy bananas
- Musa textilis (Abacá), banana species also used as a traditional source of fiber in the Philippines
