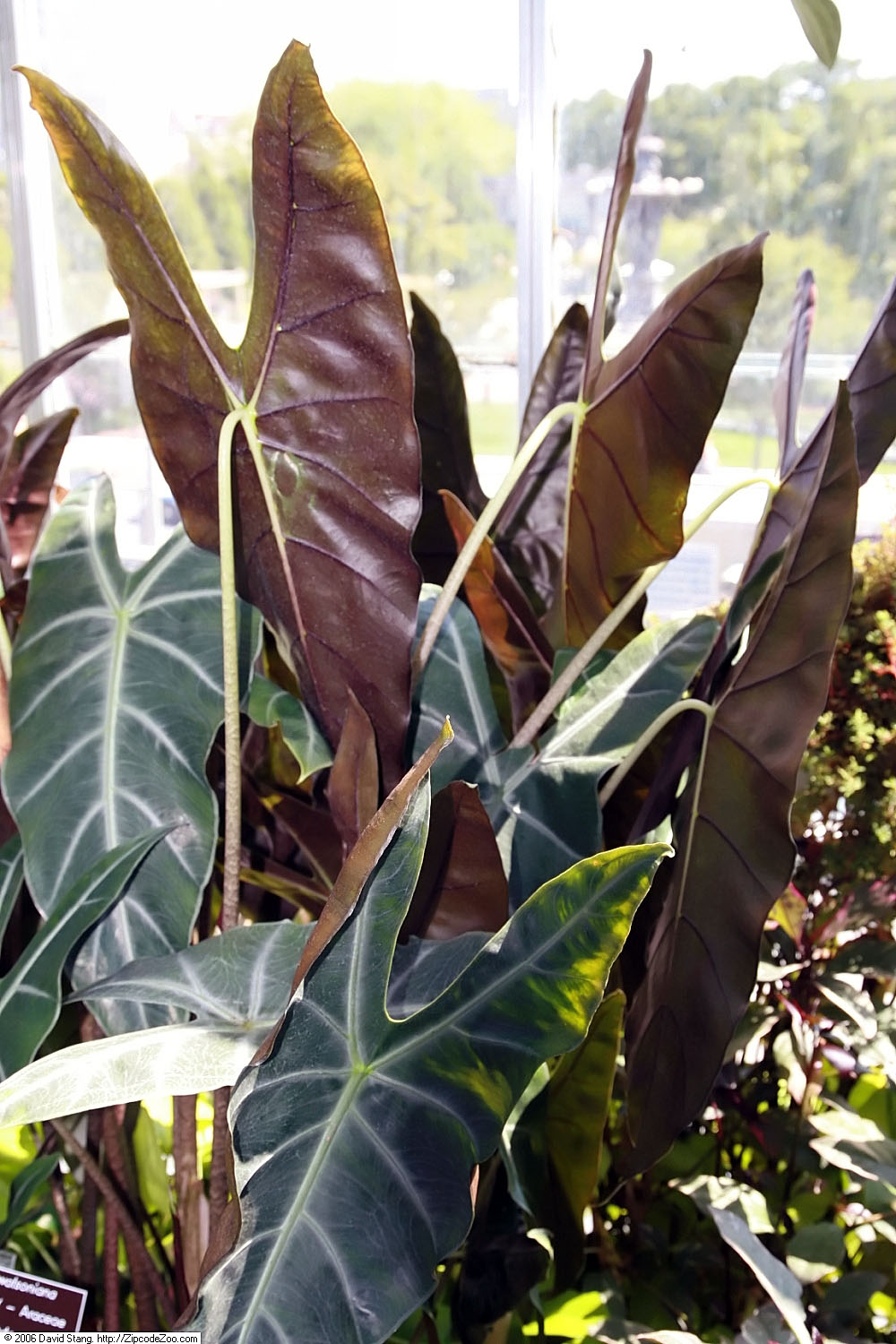
- Foliage
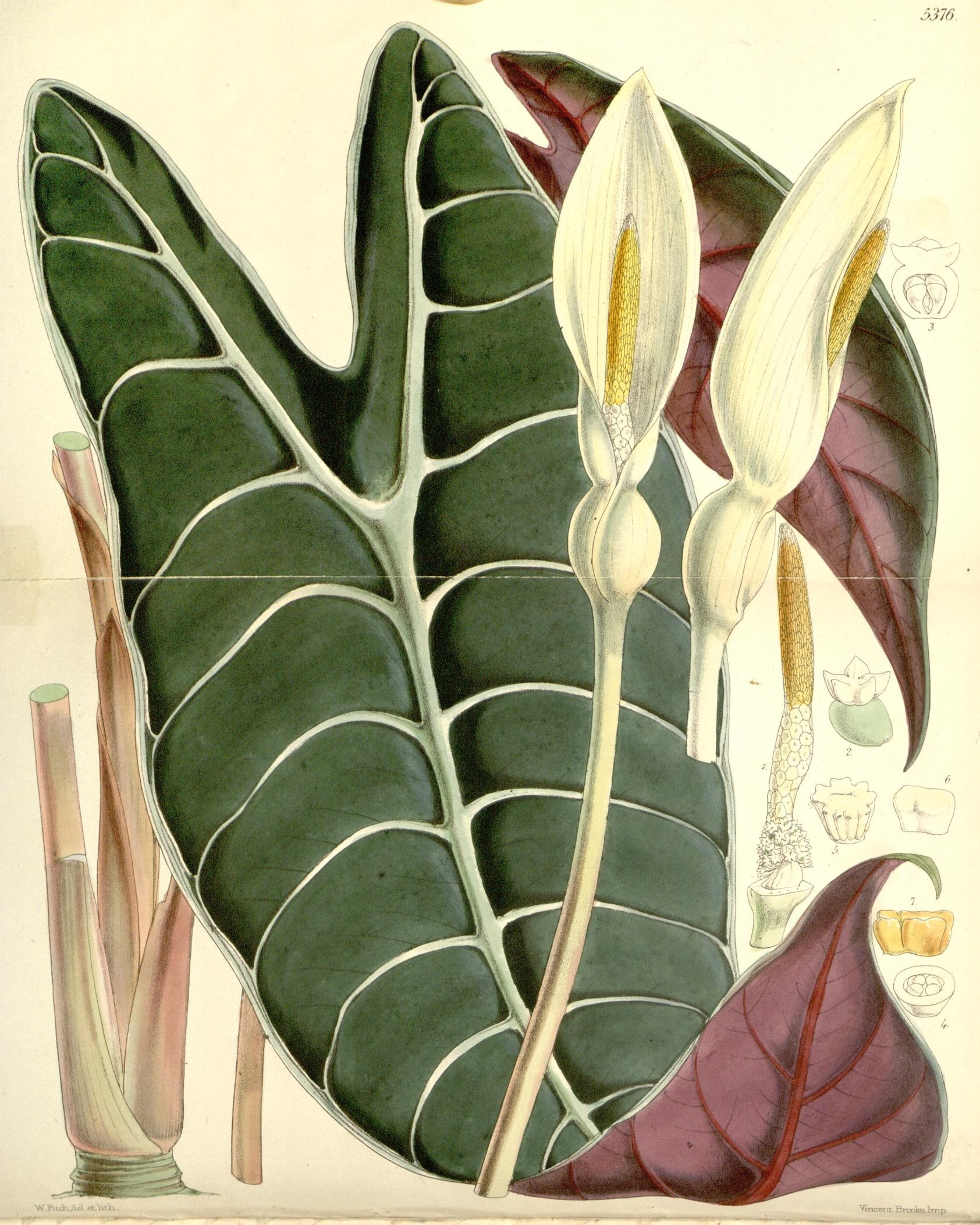
- Botanical illustration

Scientific classification
- Kingdom: Plantae
- Clade: Embryophytes
- Clade: Tracheophytes
- Clade: Spermatophytes
- Clade: Angiosperms
- Clade: Monocots
- Order: Alismatales
- Family: Araceae
- Genus: Alocasia
- Species: A. longiloba

Binomial name
- Alocasia longiloba Miq.

Synonyms
- List: Alocasia amabilis W.Bull; Alocasia argyrea Mast.; Alocasia cochinchensis Pierre ex Engl. & K.Krause; Alocasia curtisii N.E.Br.; Alocasia cuspidata Engl.; Alocasia denudata Engl.; Alocasia eminens N.E.Br.; Alocasia gibba André; Alocasia gigantea Jacob-Makoy; Alocasia grandis Clemenc.; Alocasia intermedia H.Laurentius; Alocasia korthalsii Schott; Alocasia leoniae Engl. & K.Krause; Alocasia longifolia Engl. & K.Krause; Alocasia lowii Hook.f.; Alocasia lucianii Pucci ex Rodigas; Alocasia pucciana André; Alocasia putzeysii N.E.Br.; Alocasia singaporensis Linden; Alocasia spectabilis Engl. & K.Krause; Alocasia thibantiana Mast.; Alocasia veitchii (Lindl.) Schott; Alocasia watsoniana Sander; Caladium lowii H.Low ex J.Dix; Caladium veitchii Lindl.

= Alocasia longiloba =

Species of flowering plant

Alocasia longiloba is a species of flowering plant in the family Araceae. It is the namesake of a species complex. The complex has a widespread distribution; Guangdong, Hainan, and southern Yunnan in China, mainland Southeast Asia, and western and central Malesia.

In the houseplant trade, many of the former species that were subsumed into Alocasia longiloba are now considered types or varieties, these include 'argyrea', 'korthalsii', 'lowii', and 'watsoniana'. The placement and validity of such varieties, and of any potential hybrids and cultivars within the complex is unclear, including 'Jackrabbit' and 'Thibautians'. Similarly, a cross of Alocasia lowii with the kris plant Alocasia sanderiana produced Alocasia × mortfontanensis, which may or may not be the same as the well-known hybrid Alocasia × amazonica, the African mask, formed by crossing A. sanderiana and Alocasia watsoniana, with the only certain parent in either cross being A. sanderiana.
