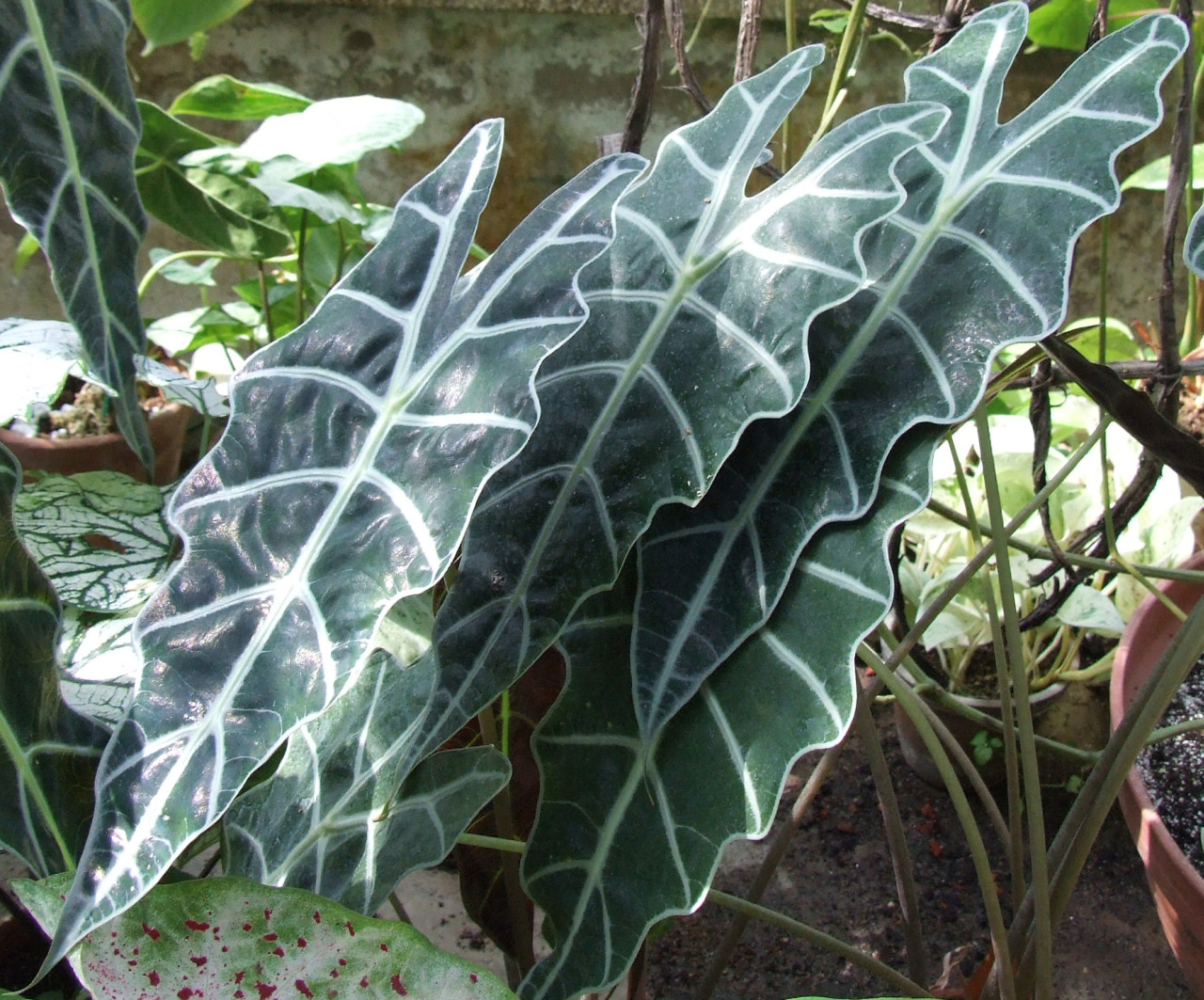
- Leaves
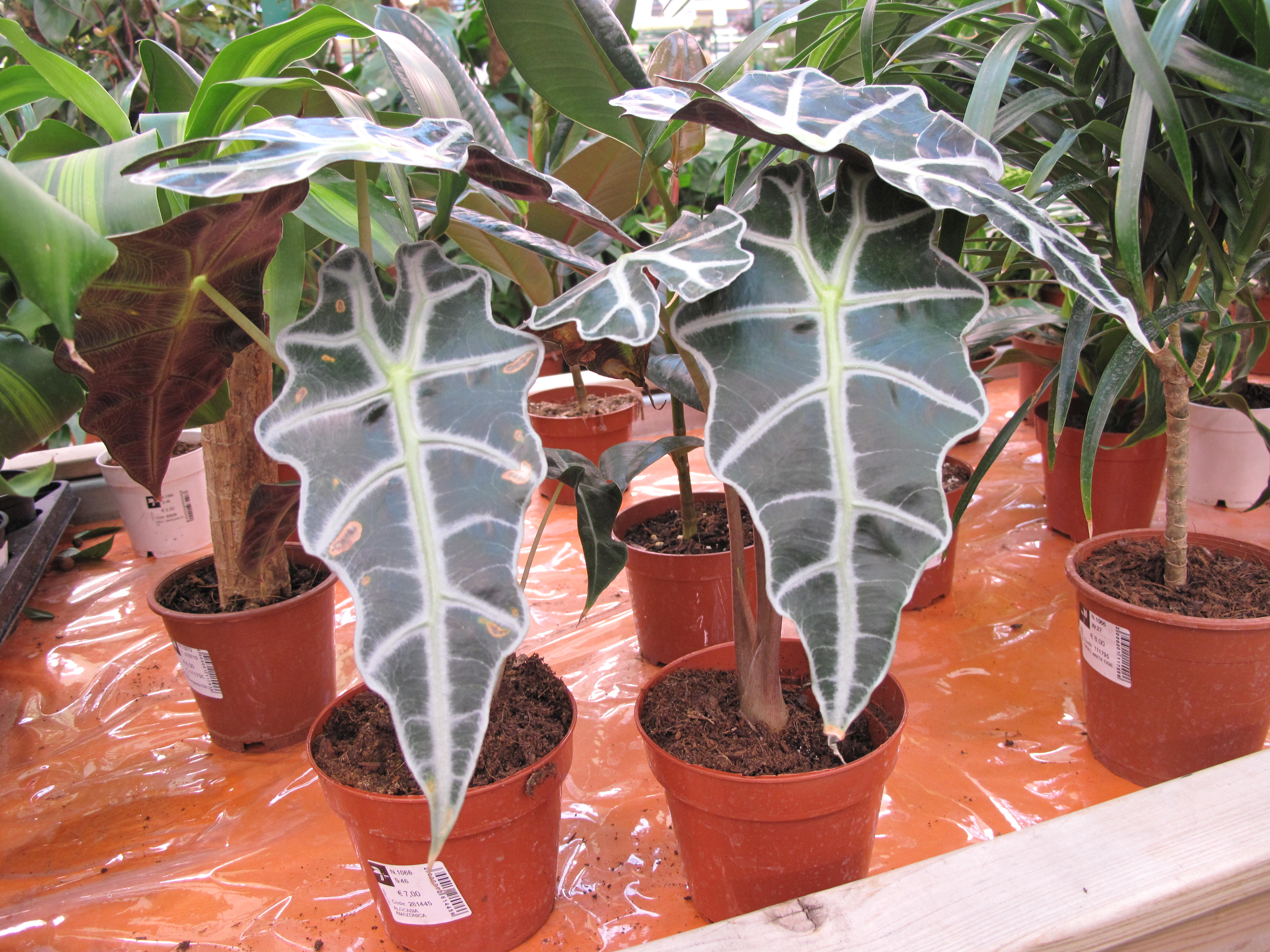
- For sale in a garden center

Scientific classification
- Kingdom: Plantae
- Clade: Tracheophytes
- Clade: Angiosperms
- Clade: Monocots
- Order: Alismatales
- Family: Araceae
- Genus: Alocasia
- Species: A. × mortfontanensis

Binomial name
- Alocasia × mortfontanensis André

Synonyms
- Alocasia × amazonica Reark

= Alocasia × mortfontanensis =

Species of plant

Alocasia × mortfontanensis (syn. Alocasia × amazonica), the African mask plant or Amazonian elephant ear, is an artificial hybrid species of flowering plant in the family Araceae. Its parents are Alocasia longiloba (from Southeast Asia) and Alocasia sanderiana, the kris plant (from the Philippines). A rhizomatous perennial reaching 1.5 m (5 ft), it has gained the Royal Horticultural Society's Award of Garden Merit as a house plant.
