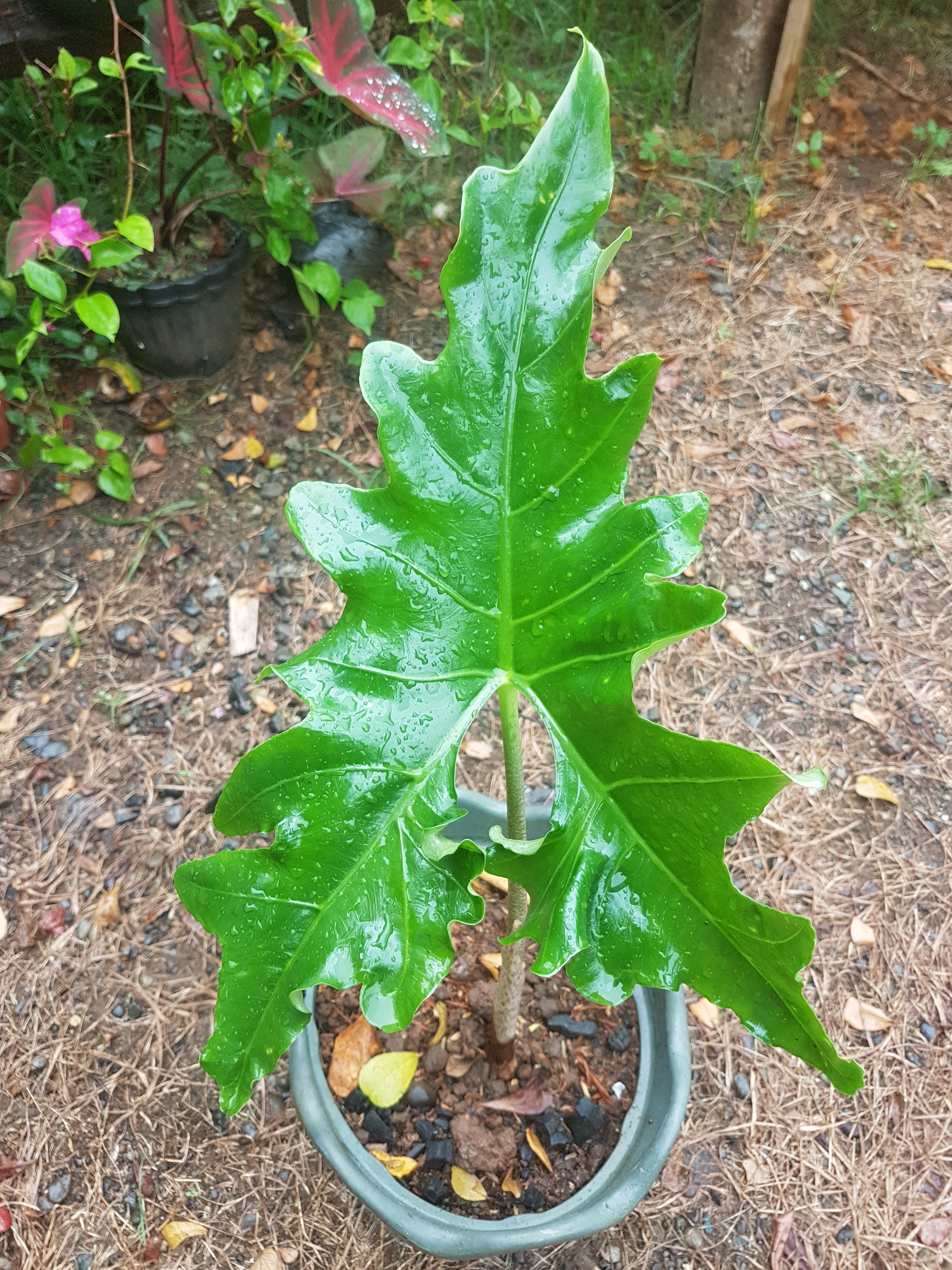
- A cultivated A. nycteris

Scientific classification
- Kingdom: Plantae
- Clade: Tracheophytes
- Clade: Angiosperms
- Clade: Monocots
- Order: Alismatales
- Family: Araceae
- Genus: Alocasia
- Species: A. nycteris

Binomial name
- Alocasia nycteris Medecilo, G.C.Yao, & Madulid

= Alocasia nycteris =

Species of plant

Alocasia nycteris, commonly known as the bat alocasia or the batwing alocasia, is a plant in the family Araceae. It is endemic to island of Panay in the Philippines. It is cultivated as an ornamental plant.

== Taxonomy and etymology ==
The species was first displayed to the public by the aroid hobbyist Antonio Advincula during a garden show of the Philippine Horticultural Society, Inc. (PHSI) in 2003. It was named Alocasia advincula by George C. Yao, the former president of PHSI in the August 2003 issue of the International Aroid Society Newsletter. However this name is considered invalid in accordance to the International Code of Botanical Nomenclature (ICBN), due to the absence of a cited holotype, a Latin diagnosis, and an indication of taxonomic rank.

It was subsequently described again in 2007 by Melanie P. Medecilo, George C. Yao, and Domingo A. Madulid in the Journal of the Botanical Research Institute of Texas. The species name "nycteris" is in reference to the bat genus Nycteris, due to the shape of the leaves of the plant.

== Description ==
Alocasia nycteris grows to around 1.5 m (4.9 ft) tall. It has 2 to 4 leaves with papery cataphylls at the base. The stems, which are erect or horizontal on the ground, are around 12 cm (4.7 in) long and 2 cm (0.79 in) in width.

The leaf petioles are green with black-green stripes. They are around 45 to 100 cm (1.48 to 3.28 ft) long and 1.5 to 2 cm (0.59 to 0.79 in) wide. The leaf blades are hastate (spearhead-shaped) to sagittate (arrow-shaped) and are not peltate. The leaves are dark glossy green on the upper surface, and a lighter green on the underside. The leaf surfaces are smooth in texture, but they become membranous when dry or wilted. They are around 20 to 37 cm (7.9 to 14.6 in) wide at the middle. The leaf margins are deeply undulated to sub-pinnatifid. The front lobe of the leaf is widely triangular in shape and pointed at the tip. The rear lobes are around 24 cm (9.4 in) long and spread out from each other at an angle of around 85° to 95°. The overall shape of the rear lobes is reminiscent of outstretched bat wings, hence its common name.

The flowers appear alone or in pairs. The spathe is light green at the base and pale yellow towards the tip. The spadix is shorter than the spathe. They develop into oblong berries that turn orange when ripe. The seeds are greenish-black and round, around 2 mm (0.079 in) in diameter.

== Distribution and habitat ==
Alocasia nycteris is endemic to the northwestern region of Panay Island in the Philippines, from Nabas to Ibajay, Aklan and Antique. It grows in the lowlands at an elevation of 0 to 20 m (0 to 66 ft) above sea level. It is common in shaded places along the roadsides, rocky areas, disturbed secondary forests, rice fields, and lowland forests.

== Uses ==
Alocasia nycteris has become a popular indoor or potted ornamental plant in both the domestic and international markets. It is easily propagated vegetatively, but plants are still being harvested from the wild. Though still common, Medecilo et al. has recommended that the plant be placed under protection to prevent rapid decline of the wild populations.

== See also ==
- Alocasia sanderiana
- Alocasia micholitziana
- Alocasia sinuata
- Alocasia zebrina
- Alocasia heterophylla
- List of threatened species of the Philippines
