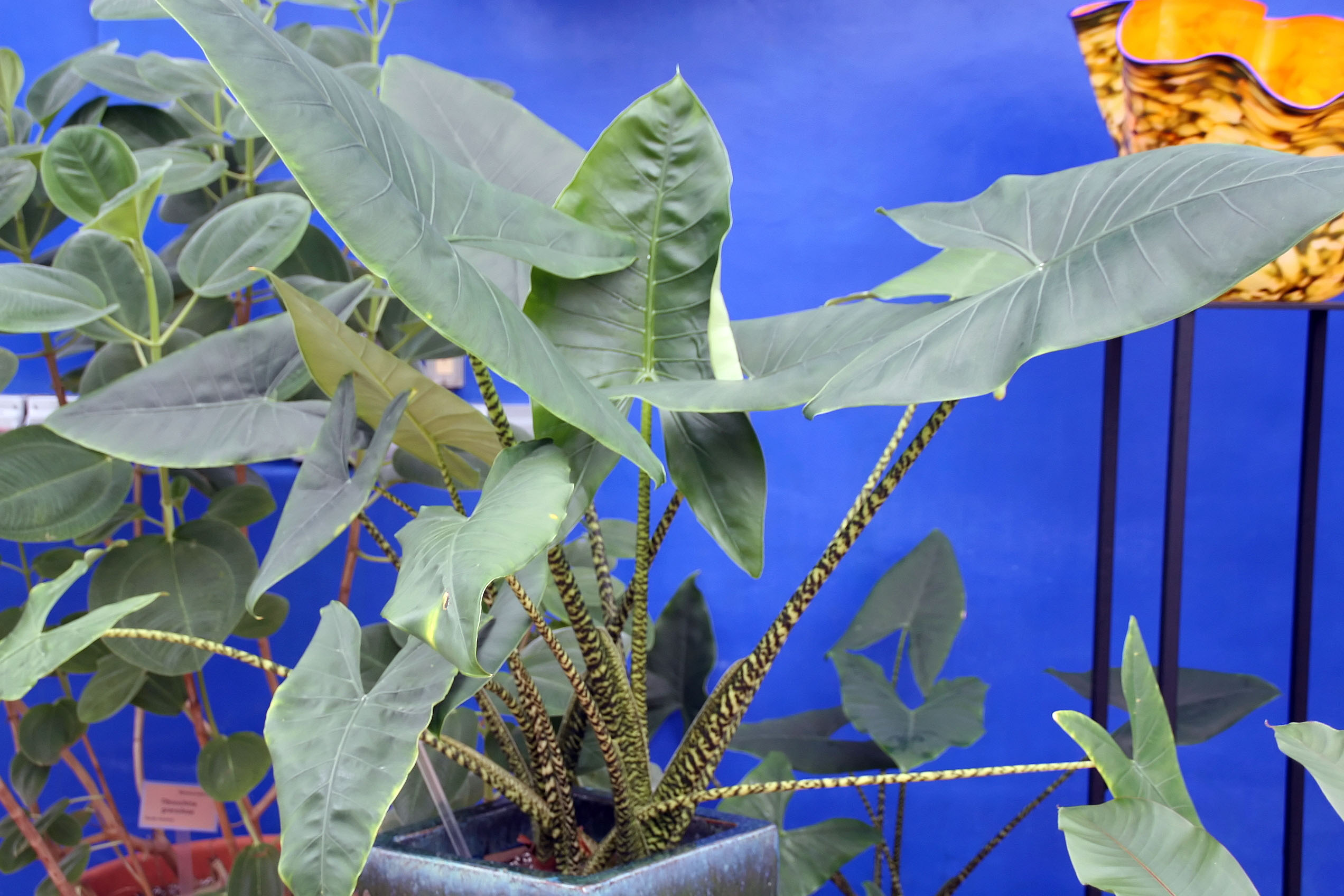
- Alocasia zebrina at the Fairchild Tropical Botanic Garden, Florida

Scientific classification
- Kingdom: Plantae
- Clade: Tracheophytes
- Clade: Angiosperms
- Clade: Monocots
- Order: Alismatales
- Family: Araceae
- Genus: Alocasia
- Species: A. zebrina

Binomial name
- Alocasia zebrina Veitch ex J.Dix

Synonyms
- Alocasia liervalii Hérincq; Alocasia wenzelii Merr.

= Alocasia zebrina =

Species of plant

Alocasia zebrina, commonly known as the zebra plant or zebrina alocasia, is a plant in the family Araceae. It is endemic to the islands of Luzon, Mindanao, Leyte, Samar, Biliran, and Alabat in the Philippines. It is commonly grown as an ornamental plant worldwide. It is also locally known as gabing tigre ("tiger taro") in Tagalog. It is nationally listed as a threatened species and collection of A. zebrina from the wild is illegal in the Philippines.

== Taxonomy and etymology ==
Alocasia zebrina was first described by the British horticulturist John Gould Veitch in 1862 from specimens collected from the Philippines. It is named after its distinctive striped leaf stalks.

== Description ==
Alocasia zebrina grows to around 1.8 m (6 ft) tall, but can reach 2.9 m (10 ft). It usually has several leaves with cataphylls. The petiole is around 1.1 m (3.6 ft) long and is pale green in color characteristically streaked with darker green to brown stripes, hence its common name. The leaf blade is arrow-shaped (sagittate), and around 45 to 100 cm (1.48 to 3.28 ft) long. It is bisected at the base into two triangular to ovate lobes. It is a rich glossy green with a leathery texture. The flowers are borne in pairs and are around 16 cm (6.3 in) long. The fruits are orange in color.

== Distribution ==
Alocasia zebrina is endemic to the islands of Luzon, Mindanao, Leyte, Samar, Biliran, and Alabat in the Philippines. It is commonly grown as an ornamental plant worldwide.

== Uses ==
The plant is easily propagated by corms produced by the mother plant.

== Conservation ==
Alocasia zebrina has not been evaluated by the International Union for Conservation of Nature Red List of Threatened Species. But it is included in the National List of Threatened Species of the Department of Environment and Natural Resources of the Philippines. Harvesting wild specimens of A. zebrina is illegal in the Philippines and is punishable with six to ten years imprisonment and a fine of ₱100,000 to ₱1,000,000.

== See also ==
- Alocasia sanderiana
- Alocasia micholitziana
- Alocasia nycteris
- Alocasia sinuata
- Alocasia heterophylla
- List of threatened species of the Philippines
