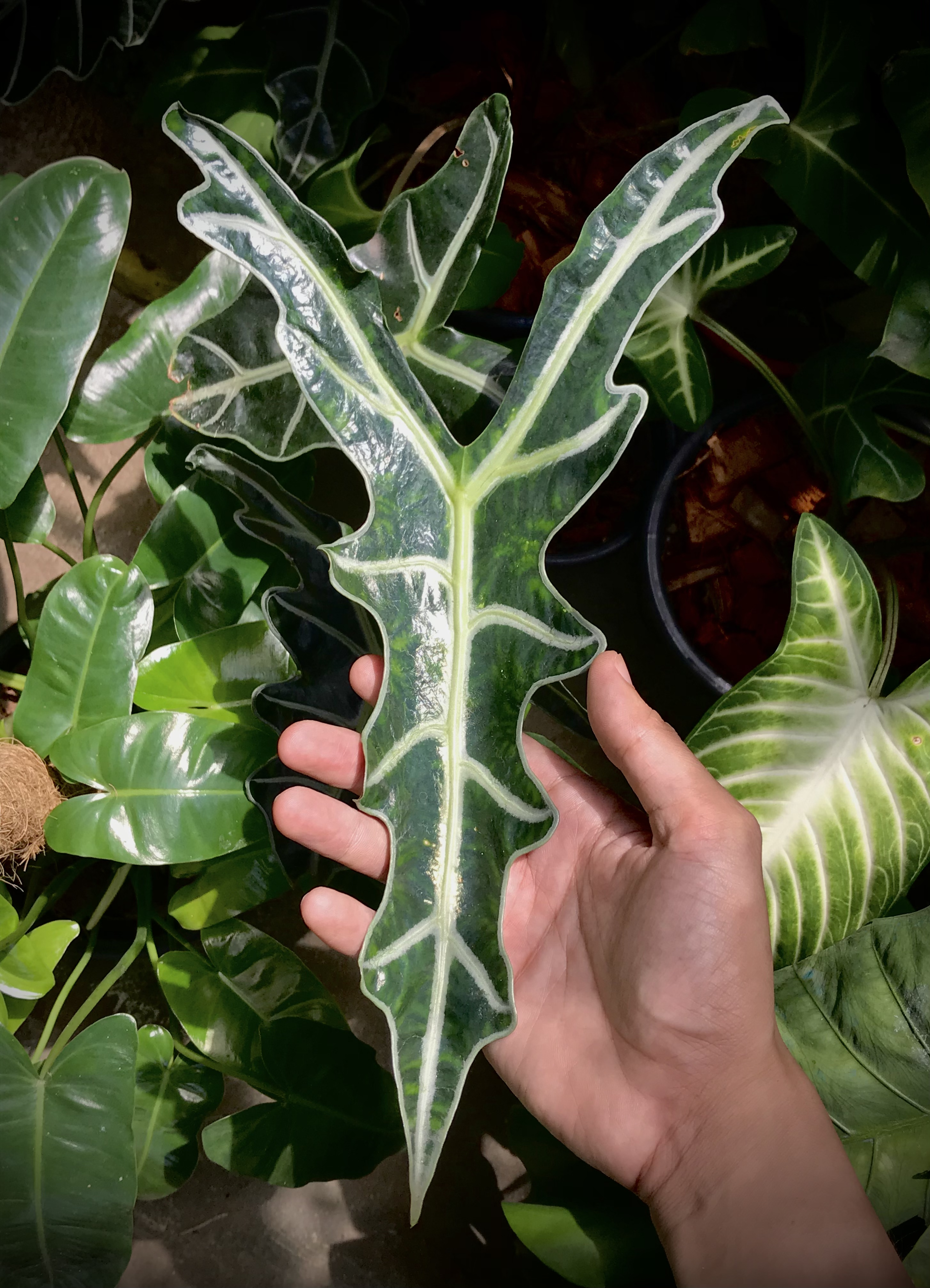
- A cultivated A. sanderiana

Conservation status
- Critically Endangered (IUCN 3.1)

Scientific classification
- Kingdom: Plantae
- Clade: Embryophytes
- Clade: Tracheophytes
- Clade: Spermatophytes
- Clade: Angiosperms
- Clade: Monocots
- Order: Alismatales
- Family: Araceae
- Genus: Alocasia
- Species: A. sanderiana

Binomial name
- Alocasia sanderiana (Schott) G.Don

= Alocasia sanderiana =

Species of plant

Alocasia sanderiana, commonly known as the kris plant or Sander's alocasia, is a plant in the family Araceae. It is endemic to Northern Mindanao in the Philippines, but is commonly grown as an ornamental plant worldwide. It is classified as critically endangered in the wild by the International Union for Conservation of Nature.

== Etymology ==
The species is named after the botanist Henry Frederick Conrad Sander.

== Description ==
Alocasia sanderiana is also known as the kris plant because of the resemblance of its leaf edges to the wavy blade of the kalis sword (also known as kris or keris). It is a tropical perennial, with upright leaves, usually growing to a height of 2 ft (60 cm) long.

It usually has a single to a few leaves, interspersed with papery cataphylls. The leaves are a deep glossy dark green to blackish-green, often with large white to yellowish veins and margins. It has three to four primary veins, usually arranged opposite each other. The secondary veins emerge from the primary veins at a wide angle. The underside of the leaf is usually (but not always) reddish to purple. The leaves are about 12–16 in (30–41 cm) long and 6–8 in (15–20 cm) wide. They are sagittate (arrow-shaped) ranging from oblong-ovate to broadly lanceolate-ovate. The margins are deeply undulate to sub-pinnatifid.

It has creamy-white inflorescences (usually paired) that are about 6 in (15 cm) long, made of a green and white spathe that covers the tiny flowers. Female flowers are grouped at the lower part of the inflorescence, whereas the male flowers are at the top. The rhizome of A. sanderiana is vertically placed and is known as root stock. The fruits, orange-red berries, are not edible.

A. sanderiana can be distinguished from similar sympatric Alocasia species in that its leaves are peltate - the petiole is attached to the lower surface of the leaves, and the inner leaf margins of the lobes are fused at a width of 5 mm (0.20 in) or more. It can be distinguished from Alocasia micholitziana (which is also peltate and also endemic to the Philippines), in that the latter has leaves with a velvety (not glossy) texture that do not have cataphylls at the base.

== Uses ==
A. sanderiana is cultivated as an ornamental plant, for its large dramatic foliage. In nontropical climates, it is used as a house plant. It is also used in making nanomaterials to fight bacteria in vitro.

== Cultivation ==
Alocasia plants are cultivated in pots as indoor plants in a substrate of sod, peat, humus and sand (2:2:3:2) with moss or pieces of charcoal added. In spring and summer give a liquid compound fertiliser 2 times a month. Alocasia needs extra light in winter; it grows better with high air humidity. Ambient air humidity is maintained at 80-85%. In spring and summer, the Alocasia needs regular watering and frequent spraying. Multiply by grafting, dividing rhizomes or sowing seeds in spring in a warm place. In winter the temperature needs to be relatively high - not lower than 17 °C (63 °F) for all the species described, in summer the optimum temperature is 21 °C (70 °F). In domestic conditions, water abundantly during the growing season as soon as the soil surface in the pot dries out, from autumn watering is reduced, and in winter moisten the soil only after a day or two after the top layer of substrate dries out. The soil should not be allowed to dry out, but excessive moisture is also extremely harmful. Any water that has leaked into the tray should be poured out a quarter of an hour after watering.

== Conservation ==
Alocasia sanderiana is critically endangered in the wild. Harvesting wild specimens of A. sanderiana is illegal in the Philippines and is punishable with six to ten years imprisonment and a fine of ₱100,000 to ₱1,000,000.

== Gallery ==
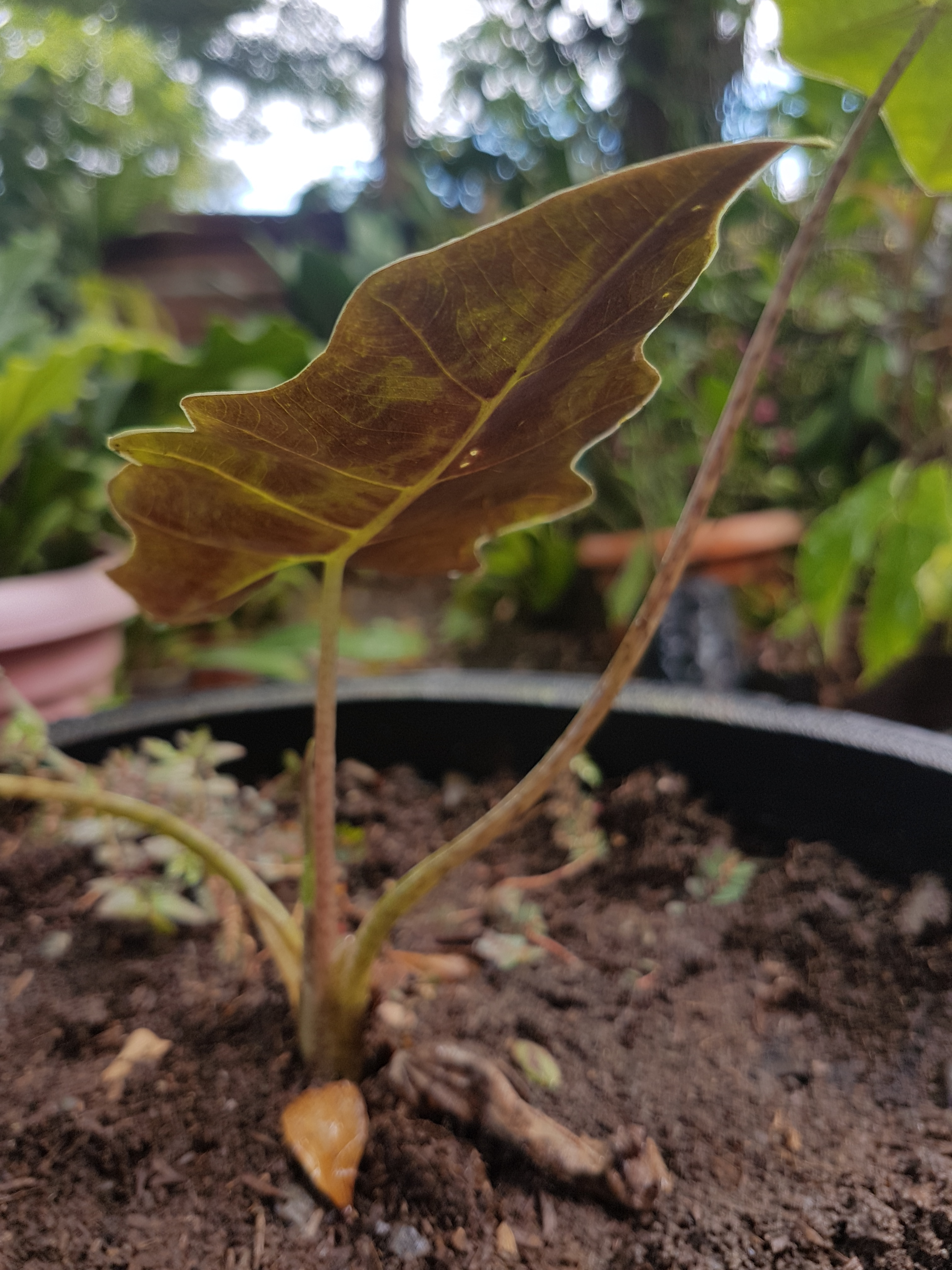
Purple underside on a cultivated A. sanderiana from Bukidnon

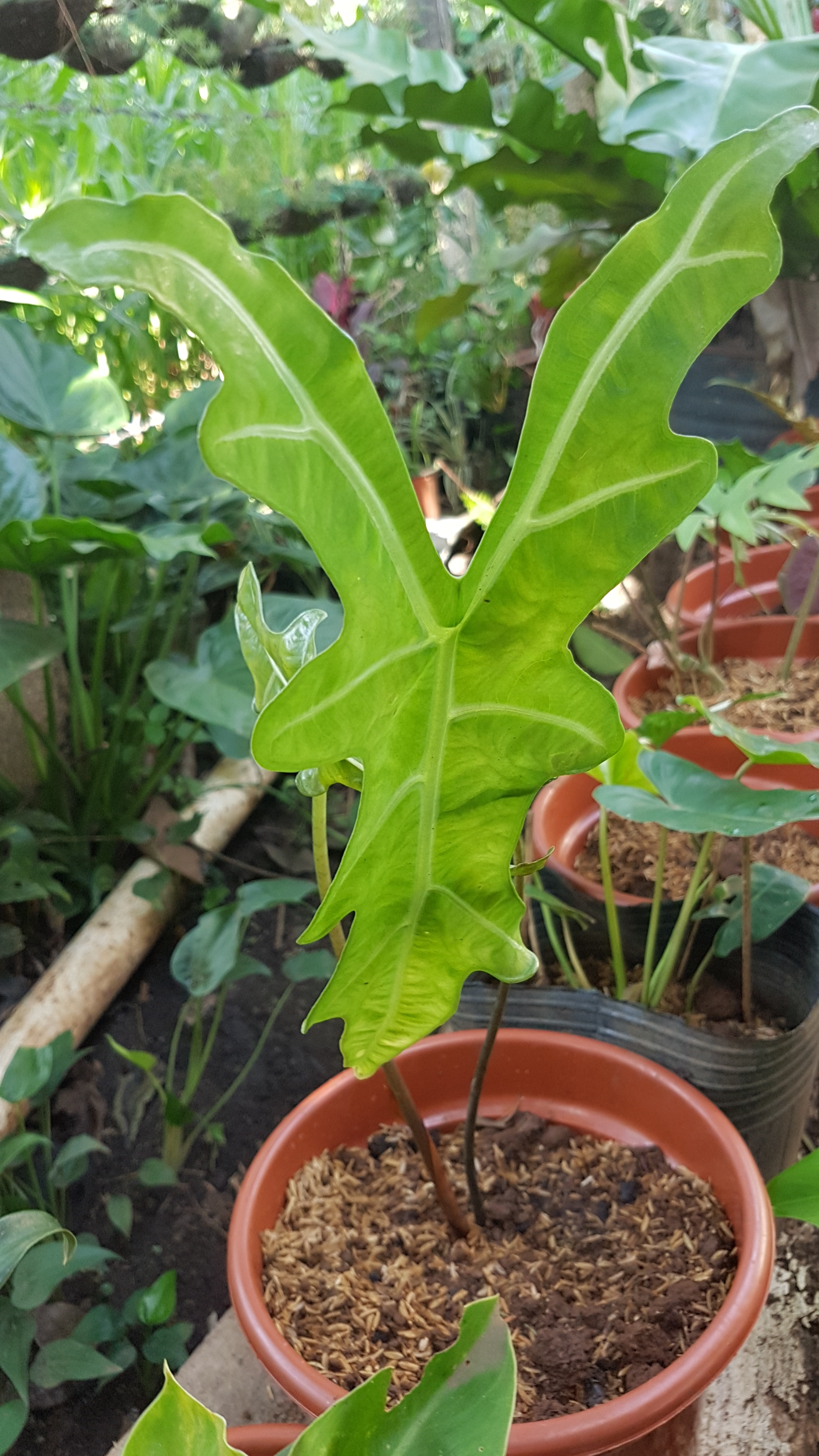
Cultivated A. sanderiana from Zamboanga del Norte

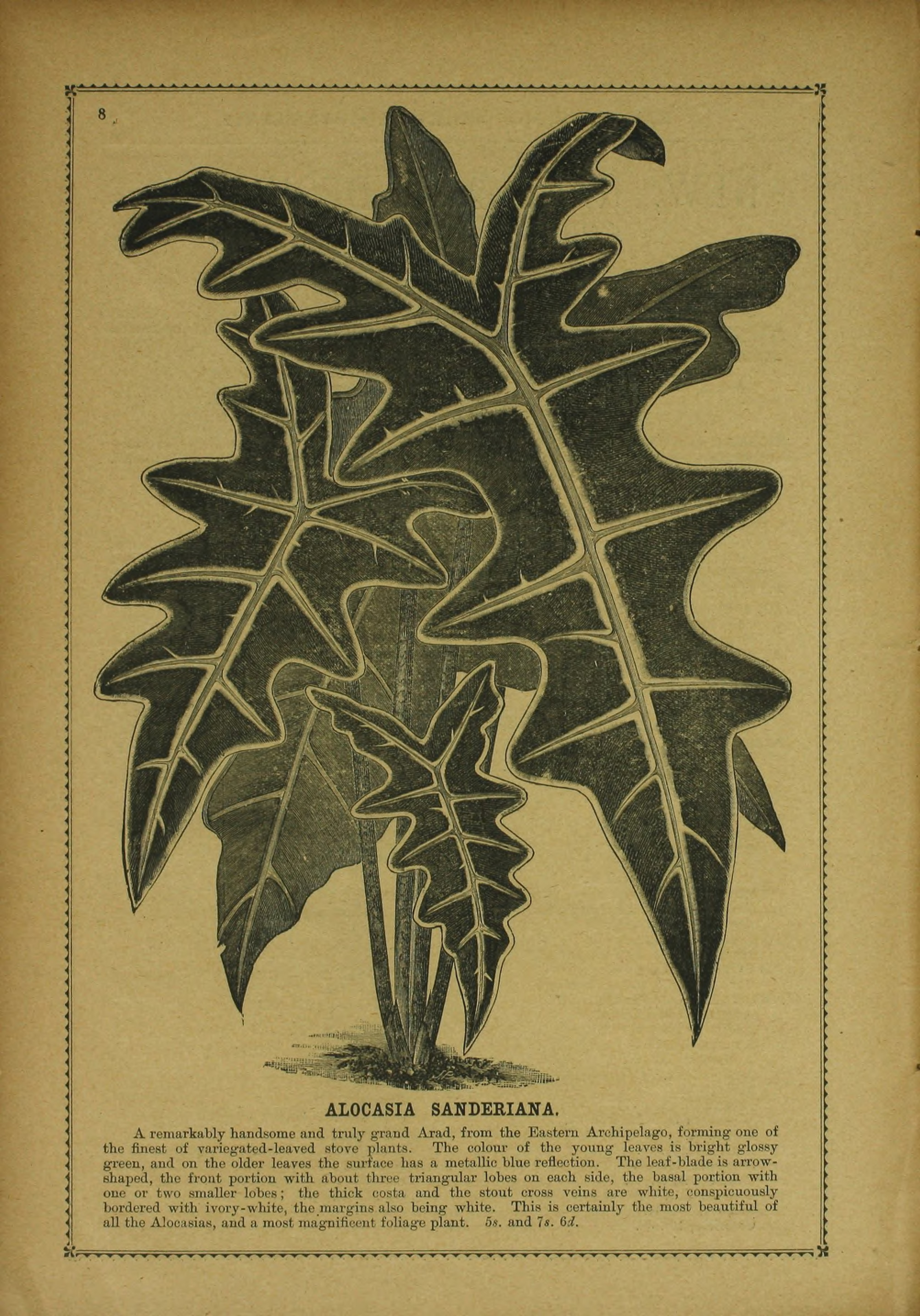
Original illustration of A. sanderiana in A Catalogue of New, Rare, and Beautiful Plants and Orchids offered by William Bull (1894)

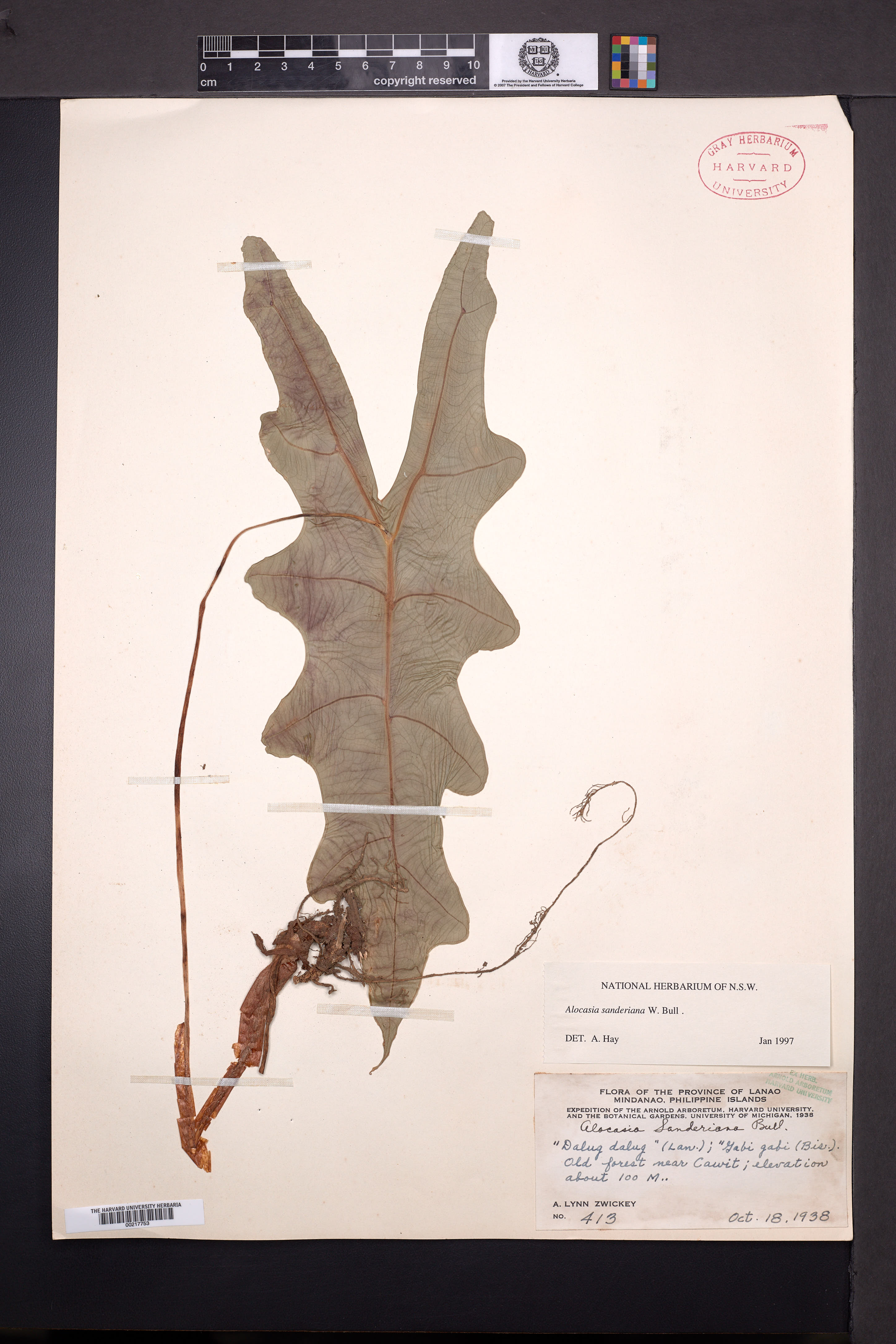
A. sanderiana specimen in the Harvard University Herbaria, collected from Kauswagan, Lanao del Norte in 1938

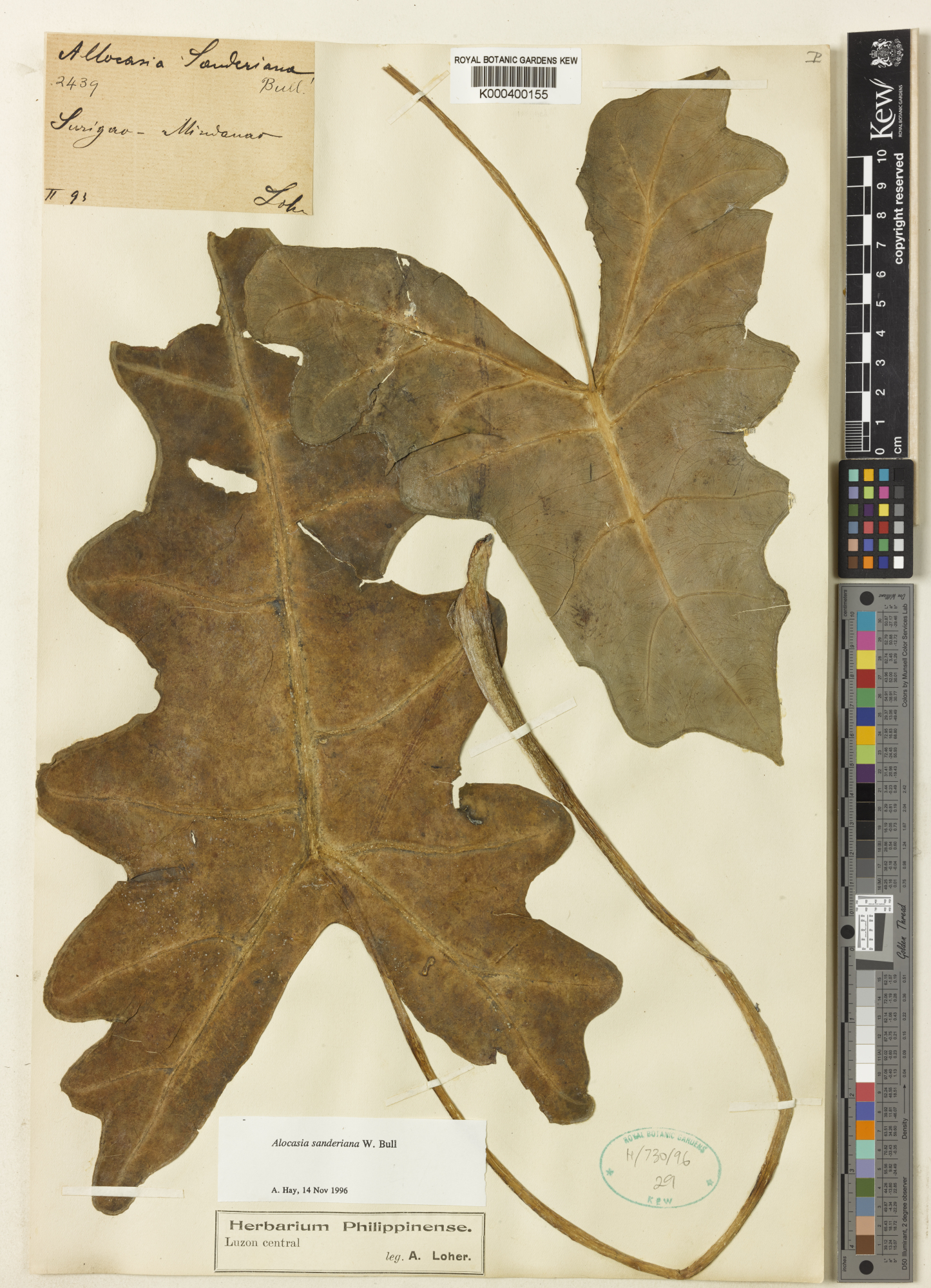
A. sanderiana specimen in the Royal Botanic Gardens, Kew, collected from Surigao in 1893

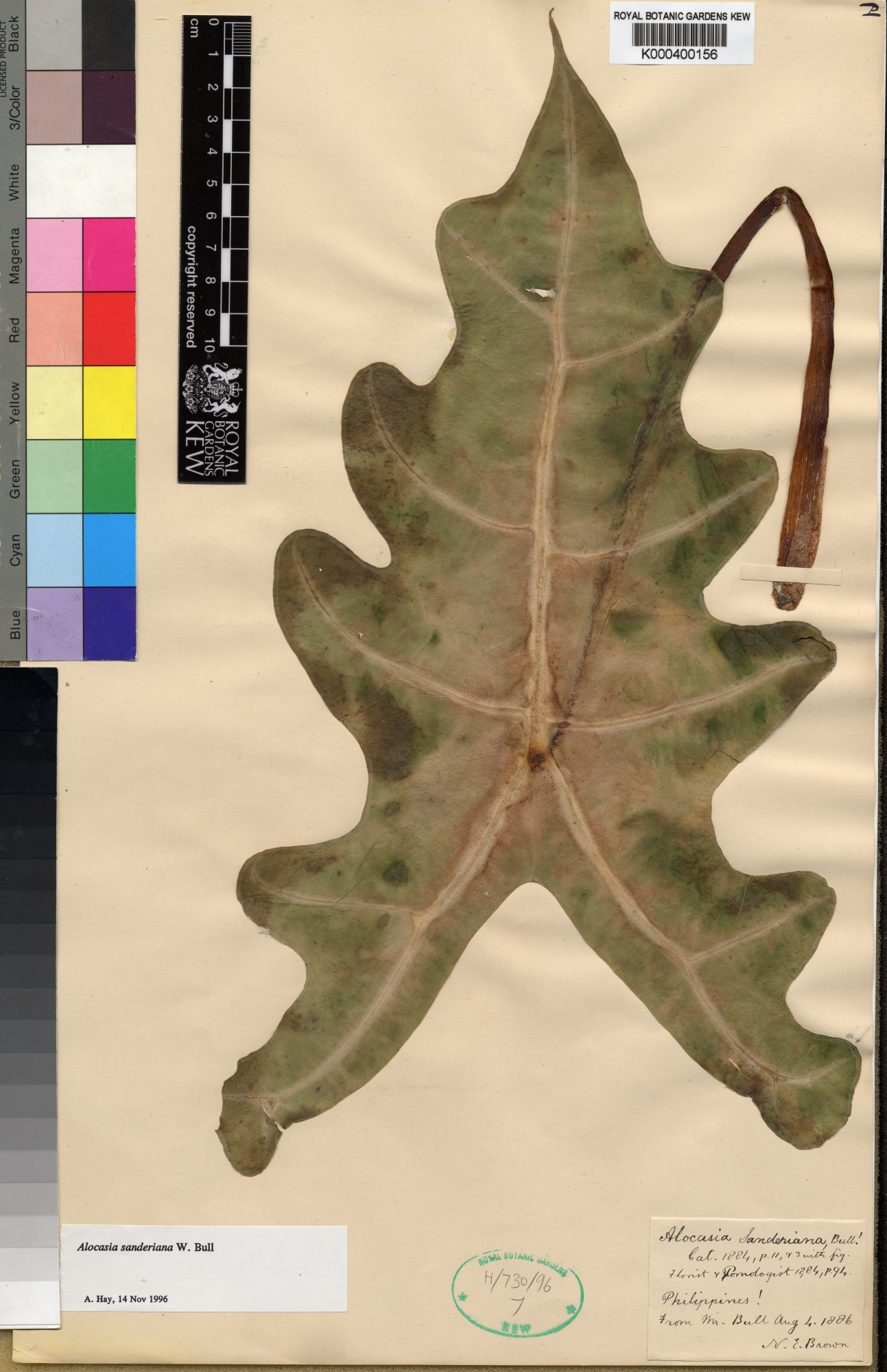
A. sanderiana specimen in the Royal Botanic Gardens, Kew, collected from the Philippines in 1886

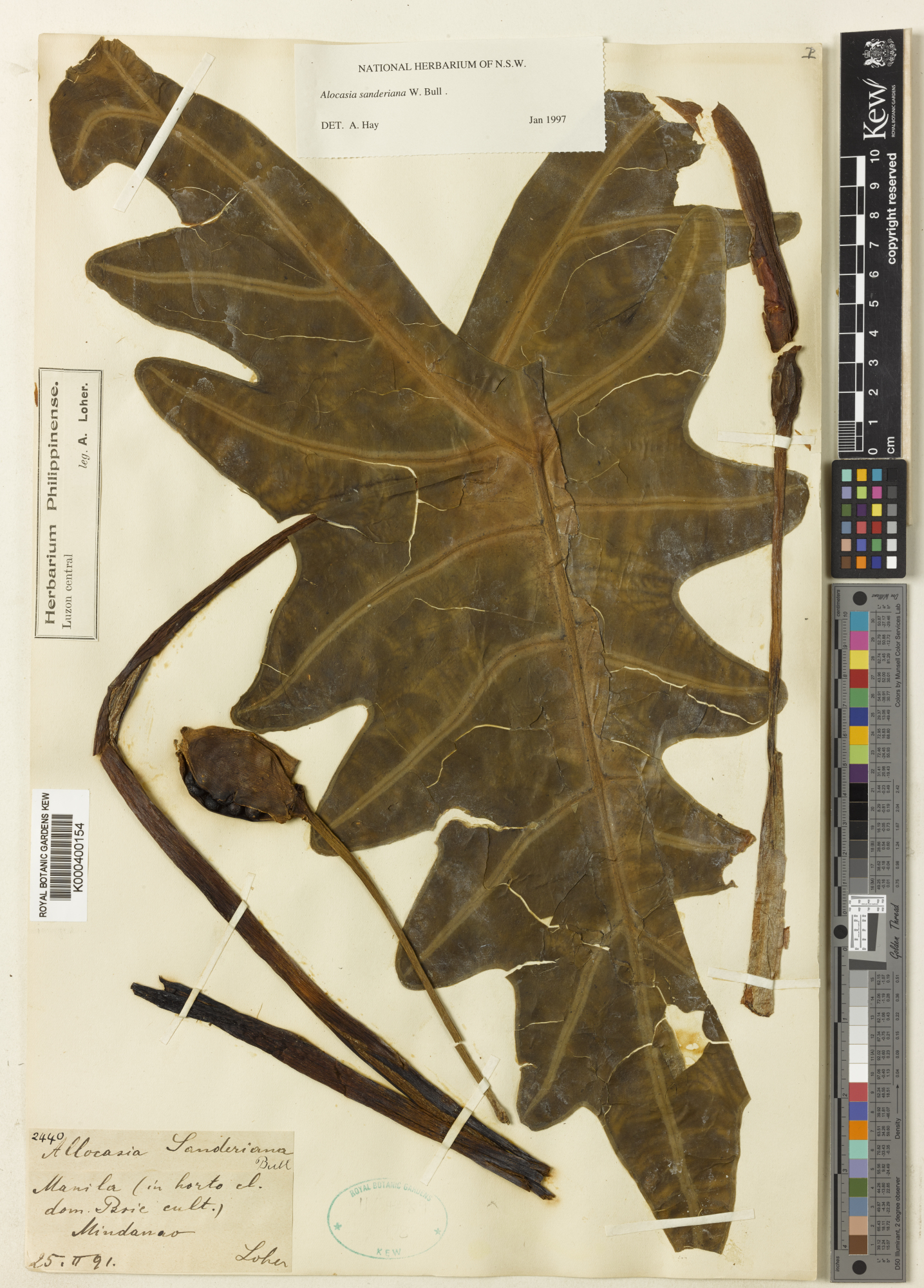
A. sanderiana specimen in the Royal Botanic Gardens, Kew, collected from the Philippines in 1891

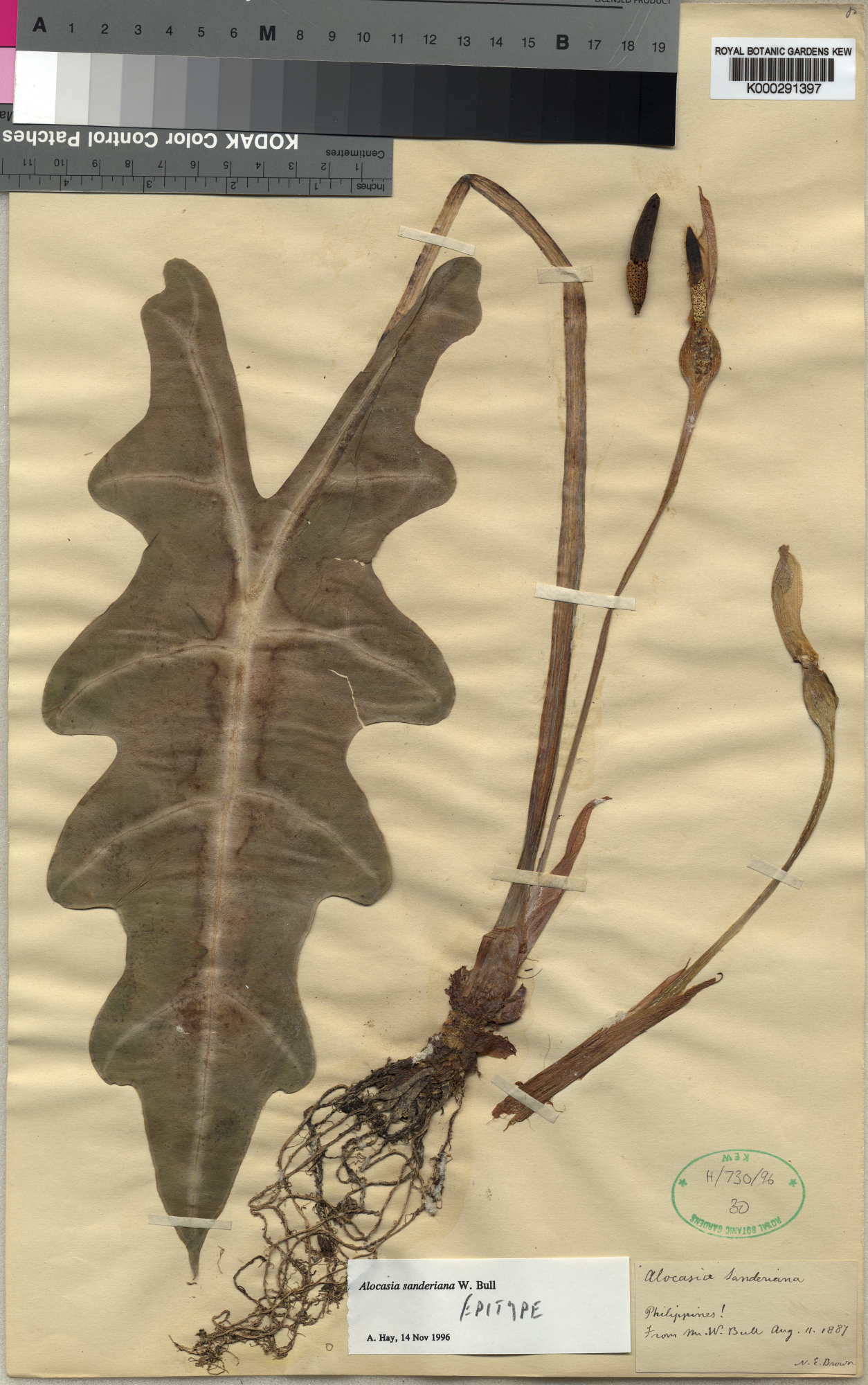
A. sanderiana specimen in the Royal Botanic Gardens, Kew, collected from the Philippines c. 1887

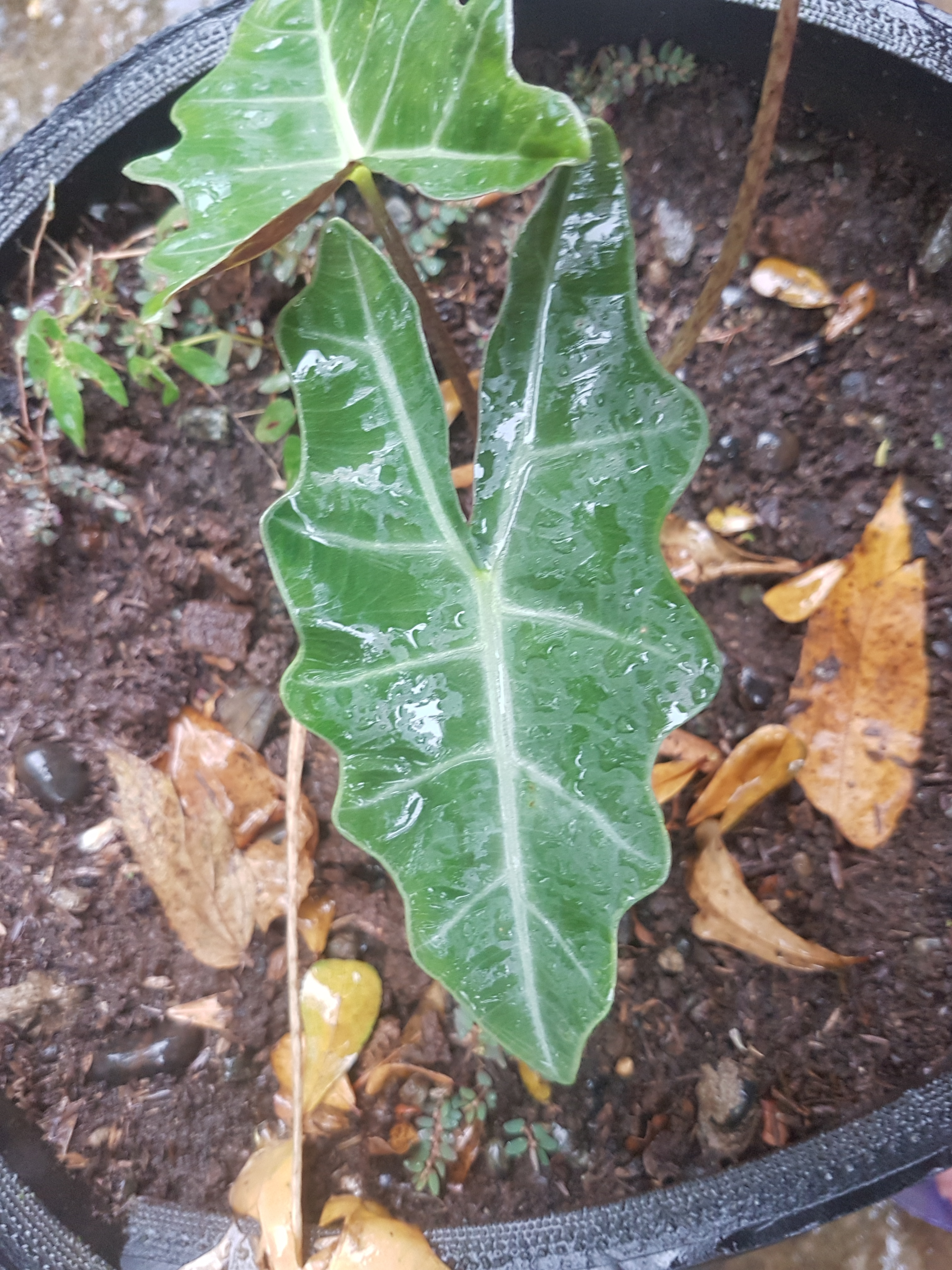
Cultivated A. sanderiana from Bukidnon

== See also ==
- Alocasia micholitziana
- Alocasia nycteris
- Alocasia sinuata
- Alocasia zebrina
- Alocasia heterophylla
- List of threatened species of the Philippines
