= History of modern banana plantations in the Americas =

Although bananas have been planted for thousands of years, the development of an intercontinental trade in bananas had to wait for the convergence of three things: modern rapid shipping (steamships), refrigeration, and railroads. These three factors converged in the Caribbean in the 1870s, and would lead to the development of large-scale banana plantations, usually owned and operated by highly integrated large corporations such as Dole and Chiquita Brands International. During the height of the American banana industry, multinational corporations, including Dole in addition to Standard Fruit and United Fruit Company, expanded their reach across Latin America and the Caribbean to become what people called "the greatest farmer in the world." Banana industry presence in these regions had many impacts on the numerous laborers that traveled or were brought to the plantations, frequently asserting authority over workers.

== Origins ==
The first step in the link can be said to have taken place when United States based business men began work on railroads that would allow the Isthmus of Panama to be traversed. Minor C. Keith won the right to build a trans-Isthmus railroad through Costa Rica in 1871.

In 1876, a New York-based sea captain named Lorenzo Dow Baker returned from a voyage to the Orinoco River, and stopping in Jamaica bought 160 stems of bananas in the hopes that he could recoup losses from his voyage by selling them in Philadelphia. His gambit was successful, and he quickly began shipping from Jamaica to North America. He then joined with Boston-based Andrew Preston to form the Boston Fruit Company, the first company to engage in all aspects of the banana industry. Later, in 1899, Boston Fruit eventually merged with other firms to form the United Fruit Company. Today, the company is known as Chiquita Brands International. To better understand banana industries global influence, by 1996, Chiquita Brands International, Dole, and a later dominant actor, Fresh Del Monte, accounted for 65% of the worlds exports, total. The secret to the Boston Fruit Company's success was the use of early forms of refrigeration to keep the bananas from becoming overripe in the voyage from the Caribbean.

United Fruit Company dominated multiple aspects of banana production, including exportation, agriculture, and labor practices of Latin America and the Caribbean. The combination of land concessions to the infrastructure builders, usually subsidiaries of the shipping companies turned fruit producers, and the monopoly over railroad infrastructure and shipping allowed the United Fruit Company and Standard Fruit to achieve nearly complete control over the economies of the countries in which they operated. Since banana exports came to dominate the overseas trade and most of the foreign exchange earnings of Central American countries, and the companies could use their financial clout as well as carefully established connections with local elites, they had great influence over politics in those areas, leading O. Henry, who lived in Honduras (which he called "Anchuria") in 1896–97 to coin the term banana republic for them. Company influence was buttressed both by their willingness to hire mercenaries as paramilitary forces and to involve the United States government in military interventions when they felt their interests were threatened.

== Labor and Environment on The Plantations ==
Although banana production for export had begun in much of mainland Central America in the 1880s, its initial impetus was from local small or medium-sized holdings. As infrastructure companies gained control of land around their railroads, however, they used their capacity to create much larger holdings and their control of trade to force the smaller competitors out. In addition they brought in thousands of new workers to labor on these large estates, many from the Pacific side of the country, many others from the English-speaking Caribbean. West-Indians also came in large numbers to work on United Fruit's plantations, working on the growing railroad, digging canals, and handling bananas. Company policies often favored the English speakers for higher level jobs, thus the most important positions were held by U. S.-born European-Americans, though African-descended Caribbean people were also favored in lesser but still skilled work.

On the banana plantations where the new laborers would work, and live, United Fruit promoted, and aggressively encouraged, voluntary solidarity associations to defuse worker unions. White higher ups often Due to the large numbers of laborers in a contained space, conflict between workers and American supervisors was consistent and often violent. Uprisings such as the Magdelena Strike in 1928, for instance, detailed the laborers' upset at the working conditions. Their demands included improved working conditions and the abolition of United Fruit-owned stores where workers had to spend vouchers and tokens, which were the favorable wage-price for the company.

Housing in "White Zones" were reserved for the company elite, and included better houses, recreational facilities, and schools; other employees lived outside this zone. Racial discrimination policies that were widespread in the United States at the time were transported to Central America.

Meanwhile, environmental issues around the proximity of many plantations being in or near swamps, as mosquitos carrying diseases were common and stubborn. Yellow fever and malaria were the most common diseases if such environmental preconditions were met, and mortality rates of the laborers increase so intensely throughout the 1920s and 1930s that it threatened to cripple production, as being in or near swamps.

The companies never used as much land as they acquired. They learned early that the plants were vulnerable to hurricanes, and to Panama disease, which first appeared in the 1910s in Panama, and completely destroyed banana growth very rapidly in areas where it had taken hold. As a result, they both acquired far more land than they needed to support banana cultivation, and they left these lands vacant as a reserve. Such policies in countries like Guatemala where landlessness was prevalent led to anti-company dissent and inhibited land reform efforts. During the Cold War, companies labeled land reform efforts as Communist and again were able to call on the U. S. to send military assistance to keep them down.

== The Panama Disease ==
In the 1920s, first scientific documentation from United Fruit about the Panama Disease began the end of the Gros Michel banana, the company's primary crop from its early plantations. Production and exportation of bananas dropped dramatically over the course of the 1920s, as plantation managers struggled to keep up with the disease's highly transmittable nature. In addition to the fruit's susceptibility to the Panama Disease, United Fruit sped up the process due to company managers lack of maintenance and knowledge of the disease, accompanied by attempts at saving their plantations proving unsuitable.

By the end of the 1950s, the spread of Panama disease forced exporters of Gros Michel bananas (a susceptible cultivar) to switch to growing resistant cultivars belonging to the Cavendish subgroup (another Musa acuminata AAA).

Marketing and labeling efforts in the late 1990s established a market for Fair trade bananas. The various organizations and companies involved focus on increasing the price paid to small banana growers and the wages of agricultural workers.

== See also ==
- Banana industry
- Banana production in the Caribbean
- Banana production in the United States
- Corporación Bananera Nacional
- History of peasant banana production in the Americas
