= Orange production in Brazil =

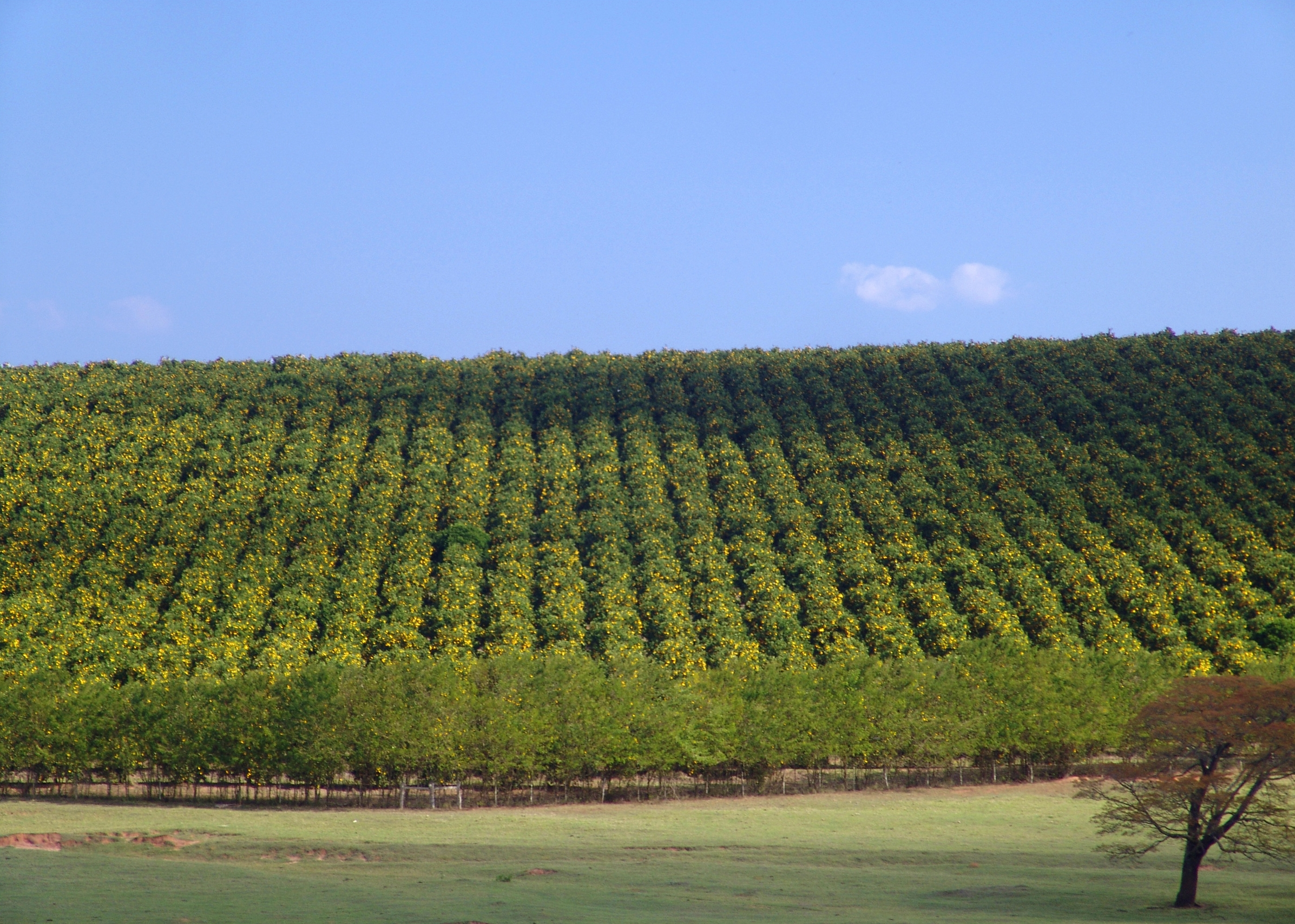
Orange in Avaré

Brazil is a major producer of oranges, which were introduced to Brazil by the Portuguese around 1530.

== Production ==
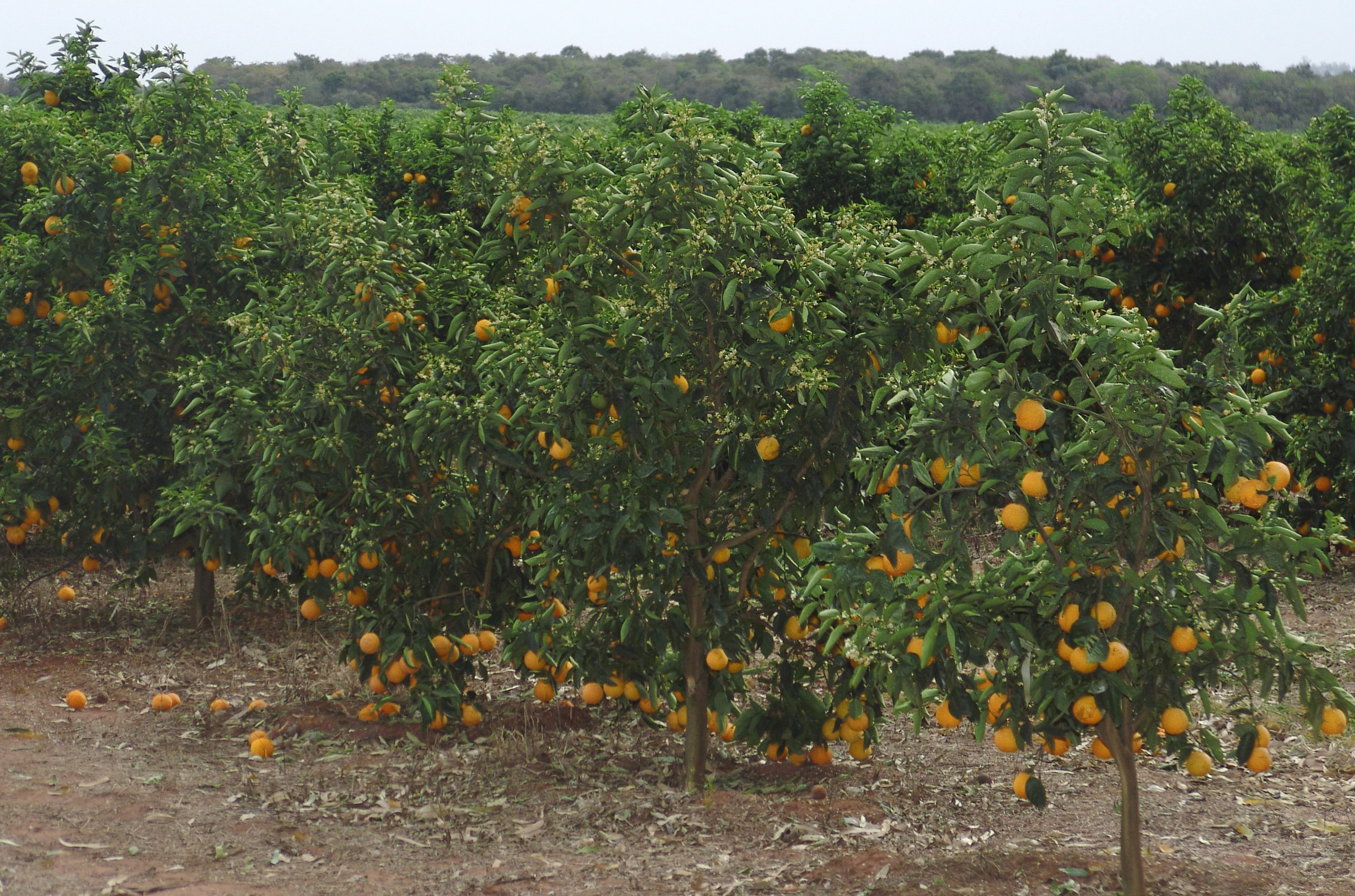
Orange in Avaré

According to the statistical database of the United Nations Food and Agriculture Organization, 702,200 hectares of oranges were harvested in 2013; this is down from 836,041 hectares in 2003.

According to the United States Department of Agriculture, 1.03 Million metric tons of orange juice and 13.5 Million metric tons of oranges were produced in 2025/2026.

Brazil is also the world's largest exporter of orange juice. According to the United States Department of Agriculture, the country shipped 1.2 million metric tons of orange juice in 2012—twelve times more than the United States, the world's 2nd-largest exporter.

In 2013, it was reported that many Brazilian orange-growers were giving up on oranges and other citrus fruits and turning instead to sugarcane and other crops. Brazilian orange-growers have been pushed out of the market because of a decline in domestic prices of oranges, as well as rising costs of labor and chemicals. One reason for low prices in 2013 was consecutive bumper crops in Brazil during the two previous growing seasons, which increased global supply and led to a 31% decline in world market prices.

The state of São Paulo is the biggest producer in Brazil. In 2019, São Paulo produced 13,256,246 tons of orange. São Paulo production is equivalent to 78% of Brazilian production of 17,073,593 tons, exceeds the production of China (2nd largest orange producer in the world) of 2019 (which was 10,435,719 tons) and was equivalent to 16.84% of world production of orange in the same year (78,699,604 tons). Other states that are large orange producers are Minas Gerais (989,032 tons), Paraná (694,424 tons), Bahia (574,211 tons) and Sergipe (364,766 tons).

Three Brazilian companies dominate the orange-juice export market: Citrosuco SA Agroindústria, Sucocitrico Cutrale Ltda, and Louis Dreyfus Commodities Brasil SA. Together, these companies account for about 40% of Brazilian orange production and 98% of Brazilian juice exports. The domination of the market by these three companies is also blamed for the low orange prices.

According to the Center for Advanced Studies on Applied Economics at the University of São Paulo, the average price per box of oranges offered by industrial buyers in Brazil fell almost 60% from January 2007 to May 2013, from 15.46 Brazilian reals to 6.50 Brazilian reals.

== Human rights violations ==
A recurrent issue in agricultural large-scale production are human rights violations, in which the orange sector has been involved as well.

In 2015 for example, the German NGO Christliche Initiative Romero and Austrian NGO Global 2000 reported that workers on a plantation in Brazil supplying orange juice giant Cutrale had not been paid for several weeks. Furthermore, the debts of the workers were increasing daily due to the high costs they were being charged for transport to the plantation, accommodation and food, which was provided by the local labour contractor at extortionate prices. The workers were thus unable to leave the plantation as they were heavily indebted to the contractor and could not afford the bus journey back home.

The authors of the report call this a modern system of slavery and they are not alone in doing so. The Brazilian Ministry of Labour and Employment itself has put Cutrale on their “dirty list” of slave labour. Brazil launched an anti-slavery strategy in the mid-1990s and since then authorities have been carrying out raids and engaging in a “name-and-shame” strategy towards companies that have been found to be engaged in slave labour. Prosecutors in the state of São Paulo say they have investigated Cutrale’s labour practices 286 times over the past decade, compared to 71 times for Louis Dreyfus Company and 50 times for Citrosuco the other two big orange juice traders. Some probes have also resulted in lawsuits and others in settlements. For example, in March 2014 a tribunal ordered Cutrale and two other companies to pay 113 million reais (USD 43 million) in penalties and to stop irregular subcontracting of orange pickers.
