= Chiquita =

Banana producer and distributor company

Chiquita Brands International S.à.r.l.
- Chiquita's logo
- Type: Private
- Industry: Agriculture
- Predecessor: United Brands
- Founded: 1870 (as Chiquita Brands International)
- Headquarters: Étoy, Switzerland
- Key people: Carlos López Flores (president)
- Products: Produce (primarily bananas)
- Owner: Cutrale (50%); Safra (50%)
- Number of employees: ~20,000
- Website: chiquitabrands.com

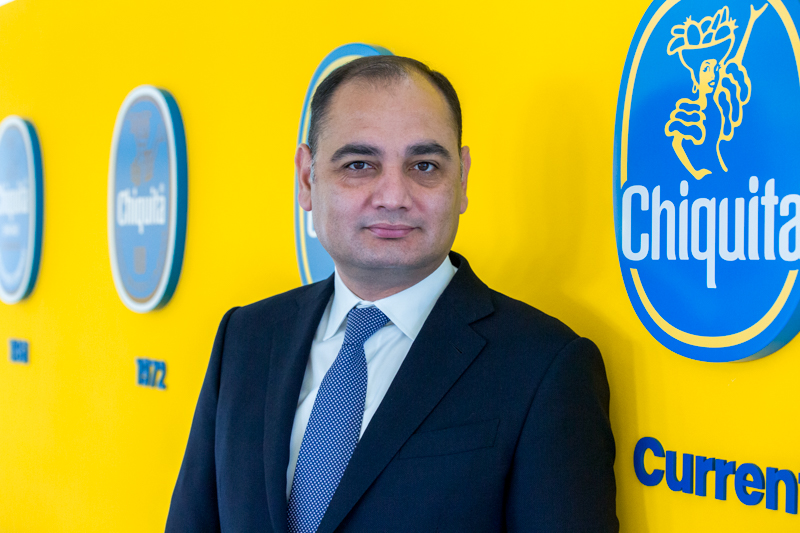
Carlos López Flores, president of Chiquita

Chiquita Brands International S.à.r.l. (/tʃɪˈkiːtə/) (formerly known as United Fruit Company) is a Swiss company producing and distributing bananas and other produce. The company operates under subsidiary brand names, including the flagship Chiquita brand and Fresh Express salads. Chiquita is among the leading distributors of bananas worldwide.

Chiquita is the successor to the United Fruit Company. It was formerly controlled by American businessman Carl Lindner Jr., whose majority ownership of the company ended when Chiquita Brands International exited a prepackaged Chapter 11 bankruptcy on 19 March 2002. In 2014, the company was bought by Cutrale and Safra Group of Brazil.

== History ==
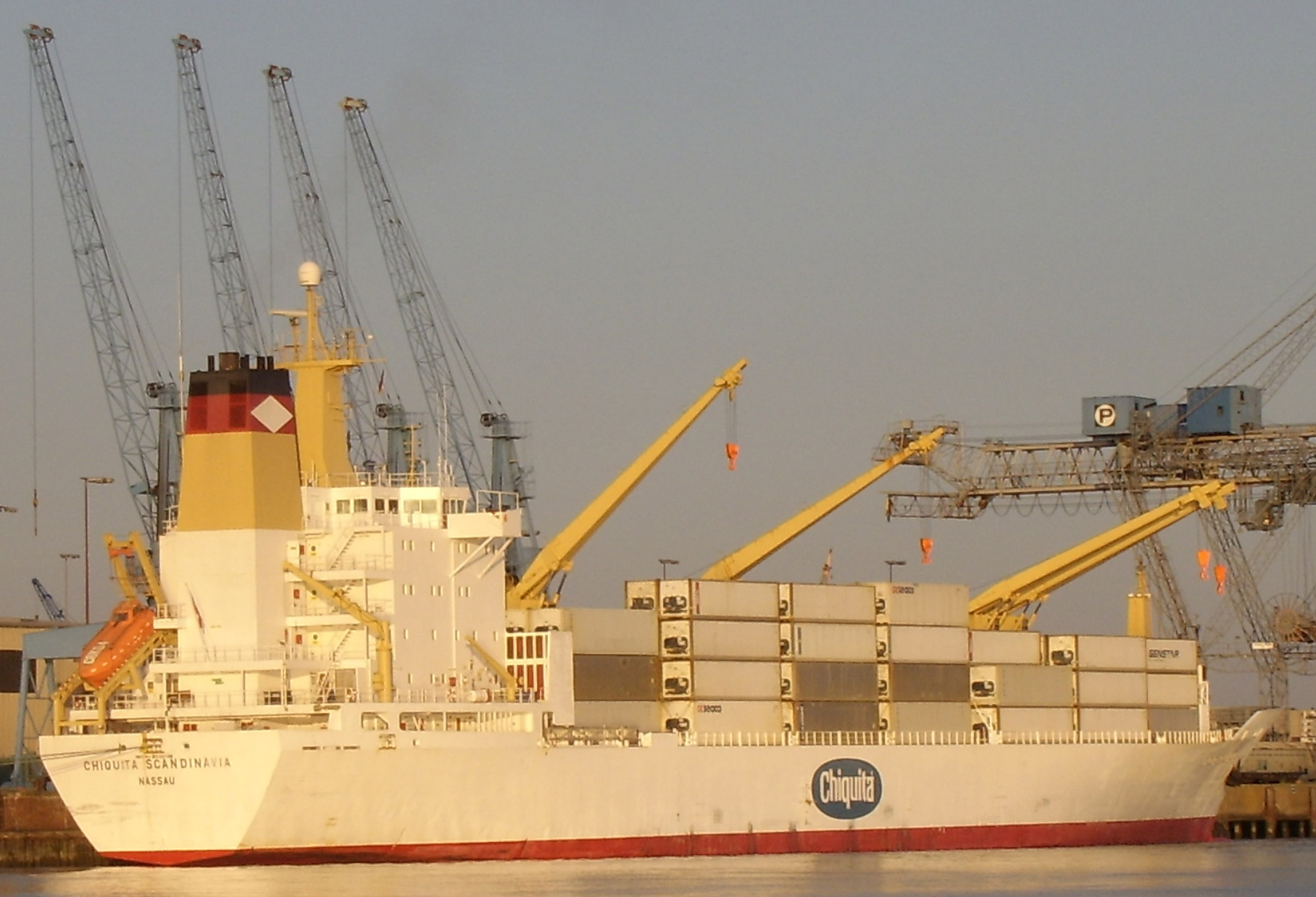
Chiquita Scandinavia, a former Chiquita Brands International ship

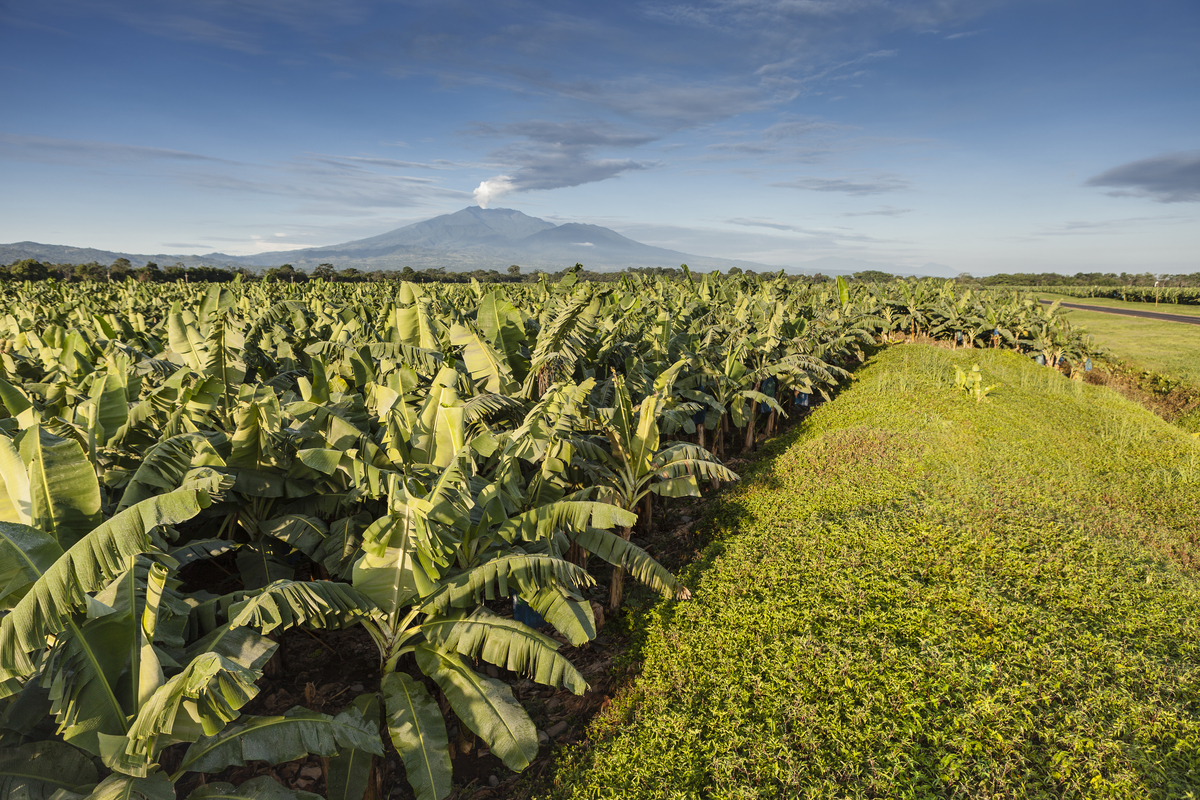
Chiquita banana plantation in Costa Rica, with Turrialba volcano in the background

Chiquita Brands International's history began in 1870, when a ship's captain, named Lorenzo Dow Baker, purchased 160 bunches of bananas in Jamaica, and resold them in Jersey City, eleven days later. In 1873, Central American railroad developer Minor C. Keith began to experiment with banana production in Costa Rica. Later, he planted bananas alongside a Costa Rican railroad track to provide revenue for the railroad. In 1878, Baker partnered with Andrew Preston to form the Boston Fruit Company.

External audio
- You may listen to the "Chiquita Banana" jingle sung by Elsa Miranda with Alfredo Antonini's Viva America Orchestra in 1946 here on archive.org

United Fruit Company was founded in 1899, when the Boston Fruit Company and various fruit exporting concerns controlled by Keith merged. In 1903, United Fruit Company was listed on the New York Stock Exchange and became the first company to use refrigeration during open sea transport. In the same year, a US-funded railroad was built in Guatemala to benefit the company. During this period, United Fruit Company was known for its aggressive and exploitative practices in its operations in Central America. In 1913 the United Fruit Company created the Tropical Radio and Telegraph Company.

In 1928, workers went on strike in protest against poor pay and working conditions in the company plantations in Ciénaga (Colombia). The company lobbied the U.S. government to send troops to assist in repressing the outbreak; however, the Colombian government opted to quell the strike on its own, sending its own military forces into the town of Ciénaga, where the strikers had gathered, on 6 December. The repression resulted in the deaths of scores of plantation workers and their families. This episode is known in the history of Colombia as the Masacre de las Bananeras (Banana Massacre).

United Fruit used emotionally charged advertising campaigns to gain support, like "The Great White Fleet," a cruise liner that took American tourists to nations in Central and South America that United Fruit had invested in. Positive corporate image was fostered by commercials, which presented these destinations as exotic, fun excursions. Nevertheless, well planned tourist trips concealed the brutal and corrupt reality that existed on United Fruit's plantations in Latin America. By 1930, the company's fleet had grown to 95 ships.

In 1944, the company premiered the "Chiquita Banana" advertising jingle, which extolled the virtues of the fruit as well as when to eat them and how to store them. The song, which had an infectious calypso beat, began with the words "I'm Chiquita Banana, and I've come to say." The brand name Chiquita was registered as a trademark in 1947.

In 1952, the government of Guatemala began expropriating unused United Fruit Company land to landless peasants. The company responded by intensively lobbying the U.S. government to intervene and mounting a misinformation campaign to portray the Guatemalan government as communist. In 1954, the U.S. Central Intelligence Agency deposed the government of Guatemala, elected in 1950, and installed a pro-business military dictatorship.

By 1955, United Fruit Company was processing 2.7 billion pounds (1.2 billion kilograms) of fruit a year. In 1966, the company expanded into Europe. In 1966 United Fruit acquired J. Hungerford Smith Company, owner of A&W Root Beer. Eli Black came in 1968 and was made chairman, president, and CEO.

=== United Brands ===
In 1970, the company merged with AMK Corporation and changed its name to United Brands Company. AMK owned the meatpacker John Morrell & Co. Black took a controlling interest by outbidding two other conglomerates, Zapata Corporation and Textron. In 1971 United Brands formed a wholly owned subsidiary, A&W Distributing Co., to retail A&W Root Beer.

After the suicide of Black in 1975, the company was acquired by Seymour Milstein and Paul Milstein. In 1980, Chiquita was an official sponsor of the 1980 Winter Olympics in Lake Placid, New York. In 1982, United Brands sold the A&W Restaurants to A. Alfred Taubman. In 1983, United Brands sold A&W Root Beer to a group of investors.

In 1984, Cincinnati investor Carl Lindner Jr. became the controlling investor in United Brands. In 1985, United Brands sold TRT (formerly Tropical Radio Telegraph) to UNC Resources.

=== Chiquita Brands ===
In 1990, the company renamed itself Chiquita Brands International, as it undertook major investments in Costa Rica. However, the company began to see a decline in Honduran operations during the first half of 1990. As a result, Chiquita initiated the "Banana Wars" with rival company Fyffes over the limited banana supply. Chiquita began illegally seizing and destroying Fyffes' shipments, as well as bribing judges to validate detention orders on Fyffes' ships. This culminated in the destruction of ten million dollars' worth of produce. Fyffes manager Ernst Otto Stalinski alleged that Chiquita used a falsified arrest warrant in a kidnapping attempt, and he filed suit several times.

In 1993, the company was hit by European tariffs on the import of Latin American bananas. In 1994, some Chiquita farms were certified by the Rainforest Alliance's Better Banana Project as being environmentally friendly. In 1995, the company sold the John Morrell meat business that was part of the original AMK Corporation. In 1998, the world's largest banana processing facility debuted in Costa Rica. In 2001, the EU dismantled their banana import policy that favored European companies. This ended any ongoing banana disputes.

=== Restructuring ===
In November 2001, Chiquita filed for Chapter 11 bankruptcy protection in order to restructure the company. It emerged from the bankruptcy on 19 March 2002, ending Cincinnati businessman Carl Lindner Jr.'s control of the company. Also in 2002, Chiquita joined the Ethical Trading Initiative and was named as a top "green stock" by The Progressive Investor.

In 2003, Chiquita acquired the German produce distribution company, Atlanta AG. It also sold its processed foods division to Seneca Foods that year. In 2004, 100% of Chiquita farms were certified compliant with the SA8000 labor standard and the company earned the "Corporate Citizen of the Americas Award" from a Honduran charity. Fresh Express salads was purchased from Performance Food Group in 2005.

=== Acquisition ===
In March 2014, Chiquita Brands International and Fyffes announced that their boards of directors had unanimously approved a merger agreement. In the stock-for-stock transaction, former Chiquita shareholders would own approximately 50.7% of the new company, ChiquitaFyffes, while Fyffes shareholders would own 49.3% of the new company. The all-stock purchase was valued at US$526 million. The agreement would have created the largest banana company in the world with projected annual revenues of US$4.6 billion and have been domiciled in Ireland but be listed on the New York Stock Exchange. Chiquita's CEO Ed Lonergan would have served as Chairman and Fyffes Executive Chairman David McCann would have become the CEO of the proposed entity. Lonergan called this a "milestone transaction" and that "the combined company will also be able to provide customers with a more diverse product mix and choice;" while McCann added that both companies would benefit from their "joint expertise, complementary assets and geographic coverage to develop a business". According to Chiquita, the deal would "provide substantial operational efficiencies and cost savings". Reuters reported that the merger would create tax advantages deriving from being based in Ireland, similar to those enjoyed by Perrigo following its takeover of the Irish company Élan. The deal was a corporate inversion, as the takeover company (Chiquita, United States), was to relocate its domicile to that of the purchased company (Fyffes, Ireland).

A $611 million takeover offer by Cutrale and Safra Group of Brazil in August 2014, was rejected outright by Chiquita, with the company refusing to meet with the bidders to discuss the offer. Chiquita said it was pressing on with its merger with Fyffes. However, shortly after Chiquita shareholders rejected the Fyffes merger the Cutrale-Safra offer of $14.50 per share was accepted. Yet the North Carolina Economic Development board asserted that if the headquarters was moved away, the company would be due to return N.C. and local incentive money. Former Charlotte City Council member John Lassiter, who heads the board, said the new owners would inherit Chiquita's responsibilities under a 2011 deal that brought the company to the city. The agreement stipulated that it received more than $23 million in incentives from Charlotte and Mecklenburg County for moving its headquarters and hundreds of high-paying jobs from Cincinnati and if it moved again within 10 years it must repay the "clawback" provision. Lassiter said of the matter: "It’s not a question of opinion. It’s 'What does the agreement say?’ I would expect both the city (of Charlotte) to impress its position (on the new owners) and for the (new ownership) to follow expectations under its provisions of the agreement."

== Operations ==
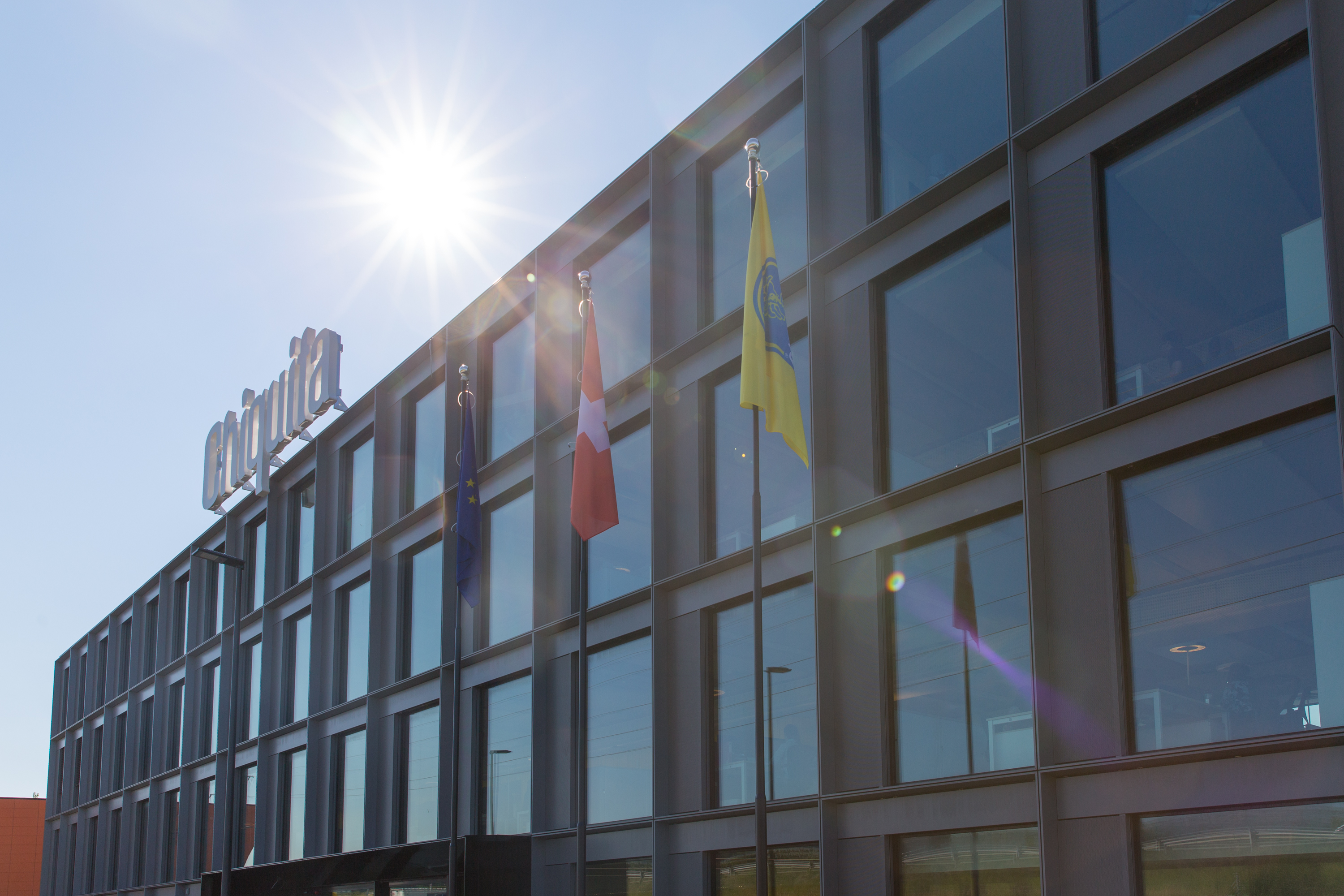
Chiquita Headquarters Europe in Étoy, Switzerland

Chiquita Brands International operates in 70 countries and employs approximately 20,000 people as of 2018. The company sells a variety of fresh produce, including bananas, ready-made salads, and health foods. The company's Fresh Express brand has approximately $1 billion of annual sales and a 40% market share in the United States.

On 29 November 2011, the North Carolina Economic Investment Committee approved $22 million in incentives for Chiquita to move its headquarters to Charlotte, North Carolina. The same day, Chiquita officially announced their move to the city, with the new headquarters residing in the NASCAR Plaza tower. Research and development was also moved to the Charlotte area. In addition to the incentives, the company cited the growing airport as a reason for the move. According to the company's 2012 annual report, the company was aiming to "transform [itself] into a high-volume, low-cost operator" and to "minimize investments outside of [its] core product offerings".

By 2019, the company's main offices left the United States and relocated to Switzerland.

== Logo ==
The company mascot "Miss Chiquita", now Chiquita Banana, was created in 1944 by Dik Browne, who is best known for drawing the popular comic strips Hi and Lois and Hägar the Horrible. Miss Chiquita started as an animated banana with a woman's dress and legs in the manner of Carmen Miranda. Vocalist Patti Clayton was the original 1944 voice of Miss Chiquita, followed by Elsa Miranda, June Valli and Monica Lewis. Advertisements featured the trademark banana character wearing a fruit hat. The banana with a fruit hat was changed into a woman in 1987. A new Miss Chiquita design was unveiled in 1998. Peel-off stickers with the logo started being placed on bananas in 1963. They are still placed by hand today to avoid bruising the fruit.

A commercial in 1947, with a theme song in English ended with the lyrics "sí, sí" emphasizing for consumers the origin of the bananas as Latin America. Another commercial featured a man of Latin descent with exaggerated stereotypical features. As times changed throughout the 1960s, so did the iconography and publications of Chiquita and their produce, of bananas.

The original anthropomorphized banana was redesigned as a human figure in 1987 by animator Oscar Grillo, known for his work on the Pink Panther series.

== In popular culture ==
- The mission patch for the sixth flight test of SpaceX's Starship rocket was based on the Chiquita logo, and the "payload" for this mission was a Chiquita banana. The company has also teased a future collaboration with SpaceX.
- Gabriel García Márquez alludes to the Banana Massacre in his novel One Hundred Years of Solitude by describing a military suppression that resulted in the death of 3,000 plantation workers in the fictional town of Macondo. While García Márquez has stated that the deaths in his novel are potential overestimations, the actual number of deaths has never been confirmed. Estimates gathered from oral histories to primary sources vary widely, from 47 to upwards of 1,000 casualties.

== Criticism ==
=== Monopolistic practices ===
In 1976, the European Commission held that United Brands had been abusing a dominant market position, contrary to Article 86 of the EEC Treaty; in particular, by imposing unfair conditions on its customers, by refusing to supply certain customers, and by charging dissimilar prices for equivalent transactions. In 1978, the commission's decision was upheld by the European Court of Justice.

=== Cincinnati Enquirer charges ===
On 3 May 1998, The Cincinnati Enquirer published an eighteen-page section, "Chiquita Secrets Revealed" by investigative reporters Michael Gallagher and Cameron McWhirter. The section accused the company of mistreating workers on its Central American plantations, polluting the environment, allowing cocaine to be brought to Borneo on its ships, bribing foreign officials, evading foreign nations' laws on land ownership, forcibly preventing its workers from unionizing, and a host of other misdeeds. Chiquita denied all the allegations, and sued after it was revealed that Gallagher had repeatedly hacked into Chiquita's voicemail system. A special prosecutor was appointed to investigate, because the elected prosecutor at the time had ties to Carl Lindner Jr.

Gallagher had claimed to have obtained over 2,000 voicemails from a Chiquita executive, but in truth he had obtained them by hacking into Chiquita's voicemail system as often as 35 times a day. He had continued hacking into the system despite being explicitly directed not to do so by editors and lawyers. According to McWhirter, he also refused to give straight answers about his source to editors and outside lawyers–facts that aroused the suspicions of McWhirter and other reporters.

Six weeks after the stories ran, Gannett reached a settlement with Chiquita, averting a lawsuit. Under the terms of the settlement, on 28 June 1998, the Enquirer retracted the entire series of stories and published a front-page apology saying it had "become convinced that [the published] accusations and conclusions are untrue and created a false and misleading impression of Chiquita's business practices". The Enquirer also agreed to pay a multi-million-dollar settlement. The exact amount was not disclosed, but Chiquita's annual report mentions "a cash settlement in excess of $10 million". Gallagher was fired and prosecuted and the paper's editor, Lawrence K. Beaupre, was transferred to the Gannett's headquarters amid allegations that he ignored the paper's usual procedures on fact-checking.

In an article examining the Chiquita series, Salon.com said the "Chiquita Secrets Revealed" series "presents a damning, carefully documented array of charges, most of them 'untainted' by those purloined executive voice mails."

=== Payments to terrorist groups ===
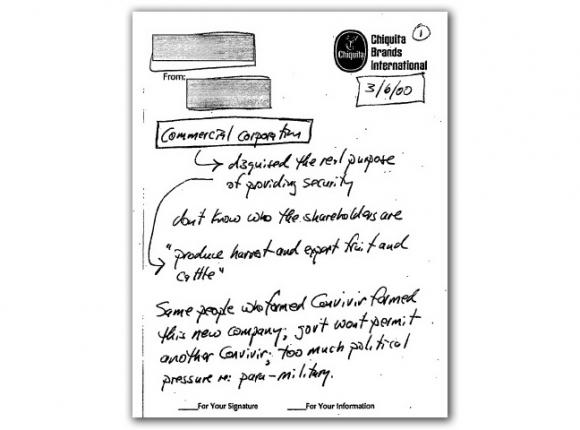
One of several documents obtained by the National Security Archive related to Chiquita's payments to terrorist groups in Colombia

In the 1990s and early 2000s, faced with an unstable political situation in Colombia, Chiquita and several other corporations including the Dole Food Company, Fresh Del Monte Produce and Hyundai Motor Corporation made payments to paramilitary organizations in the country, most notably the United Self-Defense Forces of Colombia (AUC). Chiquita paid the AUC $1.7 million in a ten-year period. Although official accounts from the company state they only made these payments as the AUC was extorting payments from Chiquita in order to ensure their security, these claims are disputed as Chiquita also allowed AUC to use their loading facilities to transport AK-47s. Chiquita's United States counsel had warned them against using this extortion defense in cases where the company benefitted from these payments, and the company's lawyer reportedly told them to stop making the payments. Chiquita's dealings with AUC continued even after it was officially designated as a terrorist organization in the United States. Although the company eventually voluntarily disclosed their involvement with AUC to the United States Department of Justice, they still sent over $300,000 to the organization even after the Justice Department instructed them to halt all payments.

On 14 March 2007, Chiquita Brands was fined $25 million as part of a settlement with the United States Justice Department for having ties to Colombian paramilitary groups. According to court documents, between 1997 and 2004, officers of a Chiquita subsidiary paid approximately $1.7 million to the right-wing United Self-Defense Forces of Colombia (AUC), in exchange for local employee protection in Colombia's volatile banana harvesting zone. Similar payments were also made to the Revolutionary Armed Forces of Colombia (FARC), as well as the National Liberation Army (ELN) from 1989 to 1997, both left-wing organizations. All three of these groups are on the U.S. State Department's list of Foreign Terrorist Organizations. Chiquita sued to prevent the United States government from releasing files about their illegal payments to Colombian left-wing guerrillas and right-wing paramilitary groups.

On 7 December 2007, the 29th Specialized District Attorney's Office in Medellín, Colombia subpoenaed the Chiquita board to answer questions "concerning charges for conspiracy to commit an aggravated crime and financing illegal armed groups". Nine board members named in the subpoena allegedly personally knew of the illegal operations. One executive for the company penned a note which proclaimed that the payments were the "cost of doing business in Colombia" and also noted the "need to keep this very confidential – people can get killed."

In 2013 and 2014, Chiquita spent $780,000 lobbying against the Justice Against Sponsors of Terrorism Act, hiring lobbyists from Covington and Burling, a high-powered white shoe law firm.

On 24 July 2014, a US appeals court threw out a lawsuit against Chiquita by 4,000 Colombians alleging that the corporation was aiding the right-wing paramilitary group responsible for the deaths of family members. The court ruled 2-1 that US federal courts have no jurisdiction over Colombian claims.

In 2016, Judge Kenneth Marra of the Southern District of Florida ruled in favor of allowing Colombians to sue former Chiquita Brand International executives for the company's funding of the outlawed right-wing paramilitary organization that murdered their family members. He stated in his decision that “'profits took priority over basic human welfare' in the banana company executives' decision to finance the illegal death squads, despite knowing that this would advance the paramilitaries' murderous campaign." In February 2018, an agreement between Chiquita and the families of the victims had been reached.

Information about who was behind the Chiquita payments to terrorist groups was made available by the National Security Archive, a nongovernmental research organization, in a series of document releases related to Chiquita's operations.

In 2018, Colombia's Office of the Attorney General filed charges against 13 Chiquita Brands International executives and administrators after tracing payments made by a local Chiquita affiliate to the paramilitary group AUC, some of which was used to buy machine guns.

In June 2024, a federal jury in the United States District Court for the Southern District of Florida found Chiquita liable for the killing of eight Colombians by the right wing paramilitary group United Self-Defense Forces of Colombia. The jury verdict also ordered the company to pay $38.3 million to family members of the victims. The case is In Re: Chiquita Brands International, Inc., Alien Tort Statute and Shareholders Derivative Litigation (0:08-md-01916), presided by Judge Kenneth Marra.

On 23 July 2025, the 6th Criminal Court of the Specialized Circuit of Antioquia sentenced 7 former Chiquita executives to 135 months in prison, and a fine of COP$13.876 billion, for financing the UAC in the Urabá region of Colombia.

=== Workers' rights ===
A recurrent issue in large-scale agricultural production are workers' rights violations, in which Chiquita has been involved as well.

In May 2007, the French non-governmental organization (NGO) Peuples Solidaires (fr) publicly accused the Compañia Bananera Atlántica Limitada (COBAL), a Chiquita subsidiary, of knowingly violating "its workers' basic rights" and endangering their families' health and their own. According to the charge, the banana firm carelessly exposed laborers at the Coyol plantation in Costa Rica to highly toxic pesticides on multiple occasions. Additionally, COBAL was accused of using a private militia to intimidate workers. Finally, Peuples Solidaires claimed that Chiquita ignored some union complaints for more than a year.

Another, more recent case of exploitative working conditions dates from April 2019. The Swiss magazine Beobachter publicised severe labour rights issues on Ecuador's banana plantations, some of which supply Chiquita. These violations involve 12-hour workdays, poverty wages and employment without contracts.

In May 2025, banana workers in Panama went on strike, protesting several issues, including changes to pensions. In June 2025, Chiquita fired all employees in the country.

=== Environmental issues ===
In 1998, a coalition of social activist groups, led by the European Banana Action Network (EUROBAN), targeted the banana industry in general and Chiquita in particular, aiming to create a new climate of corporate social responsibility. Their strategy was to encourage small farming of bananas rather than large scale monoculture, and to push for subsidies and other government relief to level the field for small producers. The fair trade movement, which sought to influence consumers to purchase the products of smallholders, also joined in the action.

Chiquita responded to the activism with changes in corporate management and new patterns of global competition, according to J. Gary Taylor and Patricia Scharlin. Chiquita partnered with the Rainforest Alliance, an environmental group dedicated to preserving the rainforest, and made major reforms in the way they plant and protect their bananas. The changes focused on the use of pesticides but also affected corporate culture. In 2000, Chiquita adopted a new code of conduct that included Social Accountability International's SA8000 labor standard. Also in 2000, Chiquita achieved Rainforest Alliance certification for environmentally friendly practices on 100% of its farms. In 2001, Wal-Mart named Chiquita as the "Environmental Supplier of the Year".

Chiquita has more recently been involved in the hazardous use of pesticides: The Danish media and research centre Danwatch, who specialise in investigative journalism, published a report on pesticide use on banana plantations in Ecuador, some of which supply Chiquita. They found aerial spraying of pesticides without warnings to workers, and the handling of pesticides without proper protections or equipment. Among the pesticides sprayed is Paraquat, a highly hazardous pesticide forbidden in Switzerland and the EU. When approached for comment, Chiquita would neither confirm nor deny the allegations, but reportedly began an internal investigation, the results of which have not been made public.

=== Operation PBSuccess ===
On June 27, 1954 Jacobo Árbenz who was democratically elected president of Guatemala was overthrown by a U.S-backed coup led by Carlos Castillo Armas, the plan dubbed Operation PBSuccess was a plan that would use similar tactics that have proven useful in previous covert operations. The plan PBSuccess would combine psychological, economic, diplomatic, and paramilitary actions. Seen in other convert operations yielding great potency in operations in Europe and Iran. The aim was to use propaganda as a "psychological warfare" aimed to discrete an enemy building support for allies. The operation used the threat of Soviet influence in Latin America, at the expense of the Guatemalan people by justifying their actions as containing the spread of communism however a more complex version should be considered the U.S was acting to protect companies, particularly the United Fruit Company (UFCO) now known as Chiquita which dominated Guatemalan economics and politics during much of the 20th century, and threat to the autonomy of UFCO. This would mean a threat to the business interests of the U.S., especially elite government officials.

== See also ==
- Grand Nain
- Paramilitarism in Colombia
- Union of Banana Exporting Countries
- United Fruit Company
- 1954 Guatemalan coup d'état
