= Club Fifteen =

1947–1953 US radio program

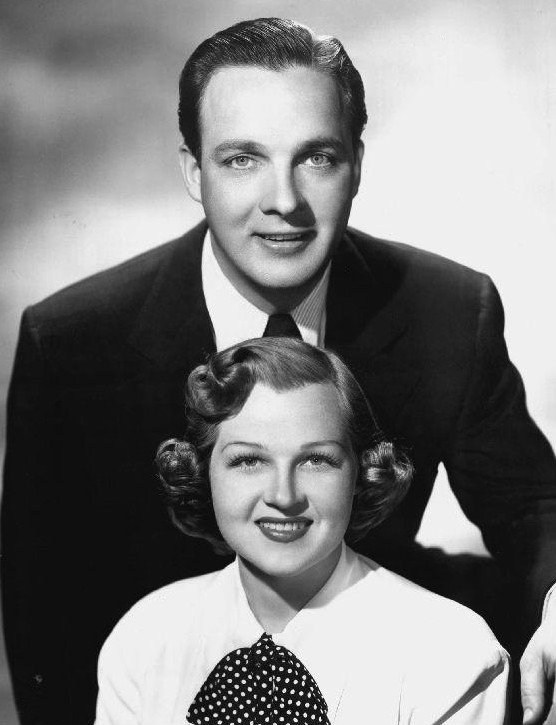
- Host Bob Crosby with co-star Jo Stafford (1951)
- Other names: Bob Crosby's Club Fifteen
- Genre: Popular music
- Running time: 15 minutes
- Country of origin: United States
- Language: English
- Syndicates: CBS
- Starring: Bob Crosby; Dick Haymes; Jo Stafford; Margaret Whiting; The Andrews Sisters
- Announcer: Del Sharbutt
- Written by: Carroll Carroll; David Gregory
- Directed by: Cal Kuhl
- Produced by: Murray Bolen; Diana Bourbon; Cal Kuhl; Ace Ochs
- Original release: June 30, 1947 – January 16, 1953
- Sponsored by: Campbell's

Club Fifteen (or Club 15)is a radio program in the United States that featured popular music. It was broadcast weeknights (except for a two month hiatus each summer) 30 June 1947 – 21 December 1951. Then, it aired Monday, Wednesday, and Friday nights until 16 January 1953. The name reflected the program's length—15 minutes. The Historical Dictionary of Old-Time Radio noted that the show "is sometimes listed as Bob Crosby's Club Fifteen because Bob Crosby was the original star, although Dick Haymes took over in 1949-50." The program was sponsored by Campbell Soups.

== Format ==
Media historian Jim Cox commented that in Club Fifteen, "Crosby followed a pattern that he had perfected a dozen years earlier, being the front man with the easygoing, laid-back technique, quick to defer to others in the cast." Musical selections formed the core of each broadcast, supplemented as "Crosby bantered back and forth with his co-stars in lively scripted exchanges laced with light humor."

A contemporary critic echoed Cox's comments. Paul Ackerman, in a review of the 25 July 1947, episode of Club Fifteen in Billboard, wrote: "Club 15 [sic] .. is patterned after a tried and proven formula ... the talent is easily listenable." He continued, "Bob Crosby ... is engaging in the light chatter ... and a good performer in his solos and duets with Margaret Whiting." Overall, Ackerman considered the program "a pleasant quarter-hour of pops and standards."

== Personnel ==
Except for the 1949-50 season, when Dick Haymes was host, Bob Crosby was the star of the show. During that year, Crosby left CBS to sing in a half-hour program for Pet Milk on NBC. Cox wrote, "When his NBC contract ended, he hustled back to re-sign at CBS, and remained—with rare exceptions—a fixture in CBS's fold for the continuation of his network broadcasting life."

Other individuals who sang on Club Fifteen were Jo Stafford, Margaret Whiting, Patti Clayton, Evelyn Knight (singer) and Gisele MacKenzie. Vocal groups featured were The Andrews Sisters and The Modernaires. Jerry Gray led the orchestra and Del Sharbutt was the announcer. Effective March 30, 1948, The Pied Pipers replaced The Modernaires, singing on Tuesdays and Thursdays as they alternated nights with the Andrews trio.

Producers were Murray Bolen, Diana Bourbon, Ace Ochs, and Cal Kuhl.

== See also ==
- The Jack Smith Show
- The Chesterfield Supper Club
