= Turbana =

Corporation

Turbana Corporation
- Industry: Produce
- Founded: August 11, 1970 in Coral Gables, Florida, U.S.
- Headquarters: Coral Gables, Florida, U.S.
- Area served: North America
- Parent: Uniban
- Website: Turbana.com

Turbana Corporation is an importer of tropical produce in North America, including bananas, plantains, pineapples, and ethnic tropicals. Turbana was the first organization to bring Fair Trade Certified bananas to North America.

== History ==
Turbana, a grower-owned banana and plantain company, is the fourth largest importer of bananas in North America, and was the first importer of fair trade-certified bananas in the continent. Turbana's parent company, Uniban, is the largest producer of fairtrade bananas in the world. Turbana sells fresh tropical products including bananas, plantains, pineapples and 18 different ethnic tropicals. It also offers a line of plantain chips in six different flavors.

1966	Uniban was born when a group of landowners came together as a co-op to export fruit directly. The cooperative only admitted farm owners who exported at least 10% of their production.
April 1969	Parker Banana, a company from Florida, signs a contract with Uniban to purchase bananas to sell to the U.S. market. Uniban sends the first shipment to the U.S. on a ship called the Matilde with 18,000 boxes of bananas.
August 11, 1970	Turbana Corporation was created as the marketing and operations arm to the North American market.
November 10, 1970	Turbana imports its first shipment to the U.S to Jacksonville, Florida.
1975	Turbana makes debut in European market. Uniban signs a contract with Velleman and Tas B.V. – now Fyffes Plc. – to distribute its fruit in Europe, thereby introducing the Turbana brand to the European market.
1978	Uniban opens a box factory, paving the way for the company's vertical integration and creating over 100 new jobs.
1983	Turbana opens a new shipping route from Turbo to Newark. A new sales team is hired and offices open in Maryland, Massachusetts, and New Jersey to accommodate Turbana's expansion plans. By the end of the year, Turbana is established as a prominent player in the North American banana market.
1985	Retail stores start selling Turbana plantains across North America.
1987	Creation of FundaUraba – now Fundauniban – Turbana and Uniban's social foundation.
1992	With the launch of baby bananas and red bananas, Turbana introduces a new category: exotics. Customized packaging is created to help launch the new varieties and retailers are educated on the new exotics.
1994	Turbana creates the first Private Label Program for Stop&Shop in Boston. Today Turbana is the largest producer of Private Label bananas in North America.
2004	Turbana begins selling Fyffes pineapples.
2005	A strategic alliance between Uniban and Fyffes is formed. Both companies now own 50% of Turbana.
2007	Turbana signs a four-year contract to become the exclusive supplier of bananas and pineapples for Disney, under the Disney Garden Label.
2008	Uniban, Turbana's parent company, builds its first snack factory in Uraba to produce plantain chips.
March 2010	Turbana diversifies its product portfolio with the launch of Turbana Plantain Chips, available in six flavors: Chili, Chili Lime, Sweet, Lime, Garlic, and Natural.
2012	Turbana launches its Tropical line nationwide, now offering 18 products including Yucca, Chayote, Coconut and Avocado. The tropical program was started to help Turbana's retail partners capture the growing demand by Hispanic immigrants.

Source: Turbana

== Product line ==
Bananas	Cavendish Bananas; Baby Bananas; Red Bananas; Manzano Bananas
Plantains	Harton Plantains; Burros Plantains
Tropicals	Aji Cachucha; Aloe Vera; Avocado; Batata/Boniato; Calabaza; Chayote; Dry Coconut/Groovy Coconut; Eddoes; Ginger; Habanero Pepper; Malanga Coco; Malanga Lila; Malanga White; Malanga Yellow; Ñame; Sour Orange; Yellow Yam; Yucca
Pineapples	Fyffes Gold pineapples
Snacks	Turbana Plantain Chips
