= Del Sharbutt =

American radio announcer (1912–2002)

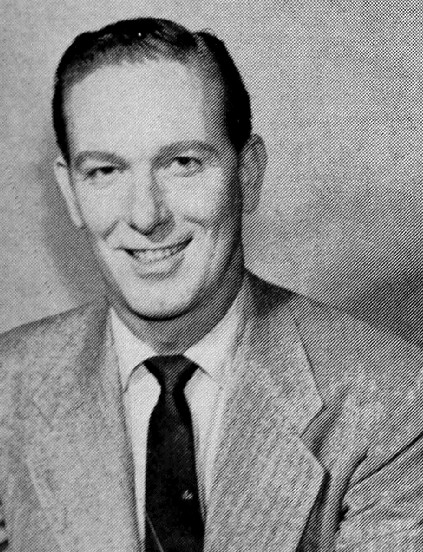
- Sharbutt in 1955
- Born: Delbert Eugene Sharbutt; February 16, 1912; Cleburne, Texas
- Died: April 26, 2002 (aged 90); Palm Desert, California
- Occupation: Announcer

Del Sharbutt (February 16, 1912 — April 26, 2002) was an American radio announcer. The son of "a circuit-riding minister in the Texas Panhandle," he was born in Cleburne, Texas, and died in Palm Desert, California.

Sharbutt attended Texas Christian University, initially planning to study law. After he became involved in drama and music there, however, he changed his career plans. His first appearance on radio was in 1929 as a singer on WBAP in Fort Worth, Texas. He soon became an announcer, and from that point on, he made his career in broadcasting. Sharbutt's obituary in the Milwaukee Journal Sentinel noted that he spent "four decades as an announcer, newscaster, and company spokesman."

A 1943 article in Radio Mirror magazine summarized Sharbutt's progress from local station WBAP to his then-role at CBS:

[At WBAP] Del was a one-man radio station, singing, acting, and announcing at $25 per week. After several years of working stations all over the Southwest, he ended up at $19 a week. Not satisfied with this progress in reverse, he went to Chicago and, after starving for two weeks, took a job singing in a Presbyterian church. There, he met a man who steered him into his first break as an announcer on Chicago's station WJJD. Del stuck at that for a year and a half, then came to New York. He arrived without a single contact, and three days later, beat out 50 competitors for an important job at CBS.

Old-time radio shows for which Sharbutt was an announcer included, The Man I Married, Lavender and Old Lace, Guy Lombardo, Jack Pearl, Ray Noble, Bob Hope, The Song Shop, Hobby Lobby, Myrt and Marge, The Hour of Charm, Melody and Madness, Colgate Ask-It-Basket, Lanny Ross,Amos 'n' Andy, Club Fifteen, The Jack Carson Show, Lum and Abner, Your Hit Parade, The Campbell Playhouse, Request Performance, Meet Mr. McNutley, and Meet Corliss Archer.

In 1958, Sharbutt was involved in an effort to revive a semblance of old-time radio on ABC. The Jim Backus Show was described in the Milwaukee Sentinel as "what might be called an old-fashioned radio variety show." Sharbutt was the announcer for the program, which featured singers Betty Ann Grove and Jack Haskell and a quintet, The Honey Dreamers. Also in 1958, Sharbutt became a disc jockey on WABC in New York City. Another old-time radio announcer, Tony Marvin, and he began "hosting afternoon record shows in their distinctively deep voices." His other on-air activities in radio included being a newscaster for the Mutual Broadcasting System, and a master of ceremonies for a Ringabuk, a local program in New York City.

Sharbutt was an announcer for television programs, including Who Do You Trust?, The Jerry Colonna Show, Your Hit Parade The Betty White Show (1954 version), All Star Revue, and Kukla, Fran and Ollie. He also appeared as himself on the TV shows Of All Things, The Jerry Fielding Show, and The Saturday Night Revue with Jack Carter. In something of a reprise of one of his regular jobs, Sharbutt played an announcer in the movie Hit Parade of 1947.

After doing commercials for Campbell's Soup on several shows that he announced, Sharbutt became more closely associated with Campbell's as a company spokesman. His obituary in the Los Angeles Times noted, "He voiced the commercials, touting the soups as 'Mmm-mm-good,'" a slogan that he created.

== Music ==
Sharbutt's obituary in the LA Times noted, "A musician as well, Sharbutt played sax, clarinet, piano, and organ, and was a songwriter. Among his credits are the theme for the television comedy series The Bob Cummings Show and the early-1950s ditty ' "A Romantic Guy, I". He also wrote "The Kitten with the Big Green Eyes", "I'd Love To", "Silver and Gold", "The Nickel Serenade", "I Can't Hold a Dream in My Arms", and "My Love" "Silver and Gold", which Sharbutt wrote with Bob Crosby and Henry Prichard, was part of the sound track of the 2013 movie 20 Feet from Stardom.

== Alcohol recovery efforts ==
During the last 26 years of his life, after he retired, Sharbutt became "known for his untiring work in alcohol recovery programs." An Associated Press story in 1977 mentioned him as one of 24 prominent people who "came out of the closet" in an attempt to encourage other alcoholics to seek help. In a 1978 interview with his journalist son, Jay, Sharbutt said that his family physician diagnosed him as an alcoholic in 1955. Sharbutt recalled, "I said, 'That's an awful thing to say to a friend.' He said, 'That's a diagnosis, not a put-down. It is a killer disease.'"

In the interview, Sharbutt said that before the diagnosis, "My drinking was getting out of control. I nearly drank myself to death trying to have fun. I knew it was not the real me. I was now drinking just to stay even, to function, survive, not to get high or have fun. But I still did it after work. I did hundreds of shows with hangovers." After his doctor intervened, Sharbutt was helped by some of the doctor's patients who were recovered alcoholics. Sharbutt said, "It was my association with these recovered alcoholics that enabled me to stop drinking nearly 24 years ago. My greatest joy since has been trying to help other practicing alcoholics do what I've done."

Much of Sharbutt's work in that regard was focused around Palm Desert, California, where his wife and he moved after he retired. Rank wrote, "Del and Dr. Joe Cruse ... started an educational program on alcoholism at Eisenhower Medical Center called 'The Alcohol Awareness Hour.' It featured locally and nationally known recovering alcoholics who gave talks and answered questions on the disease." Sharbutt produced a program, "Jazz Without Booze", that featured recovering jazz musicians, singers, and others. The show was produced for 17 years and always sold out the first day tickets were available. Proceeds went to the volunteer program of the Eisenhower Medical Center.

Sharbutt and his wife (known professionally as Meri Bell), played integral roles in encouraging former First Lady Betty Ford to establish the Betty Ford Center. Bell was Ford's sponsor in Alcoholics Anonymous. Ford's obituary in USA Today related developments after she received hospital treatment for recovering alcoholics:

Ford was encouraged to help other drug and alcohol addicts as part of her therapy, but Bell's husband, the late Del Sharbutt, Eisenhower [Medical Center] board President John Sinn and Chairwoman Dolores Hope sought to integrally involve the Fords in their medical center. "After she got out of treatment," Sharbutt told The Desert Sun in the 1990s, "Dolores [Hope] called her and said, 'You're the new kid on the block. Do you see anything around here that we're not doing that we ought to be doing?' Betty spoke right up and said, 'Yes, you don't have a program for alcoholism or chemical dependency.'"

== Family ==
Sharbutt was married to Mary C. Balsley, who sang professionally as Meri Bell. They had two sons, Jay Sharbutt and Bill Sharbutt, and a daughter, M.D. Ridge.
