= The Jack Carson Show =

Radio comedy-variety program

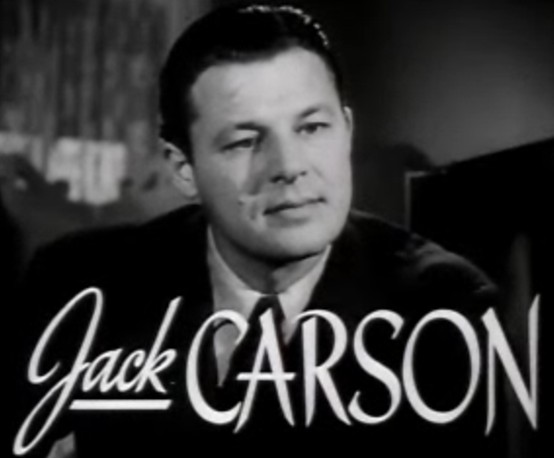
- Jack Carson
- Other names: New Jack Carson Show; The Sealtest Village Store
- Genre: Comedy-variety
- Country of origin: United States
- Language: English
- Home station: KNX
- Syndicates: CBS; NBC; CBC Dominion
- TV adaptations: The Jack Carson Show
- Starring: Jack Carson
- Announcer: Del Sharbutt; Carlton KaDell; Howard Petrie; Hy Averback; Bob Stewart
- Written by: Sol Stein; Tom Adair; Jack Douglas; Howard Harris; Leo Solomon; Dave Swift; Leonard Levinson; Lou Fulton; Mack Benoff
- Directed by: Bill Brennan; Vick Knight; Sam Fuller; Larry Berns
- Produced by: Bill Brennan; Vick Knight; Sam Fuller; Larry Berns
- Original release: June 2, 1943 – December 20, 1956
- Opening theme: "The Moment We Met"
- Sponsored by: Campbell Soup Company; Sanka coffee Sealtest

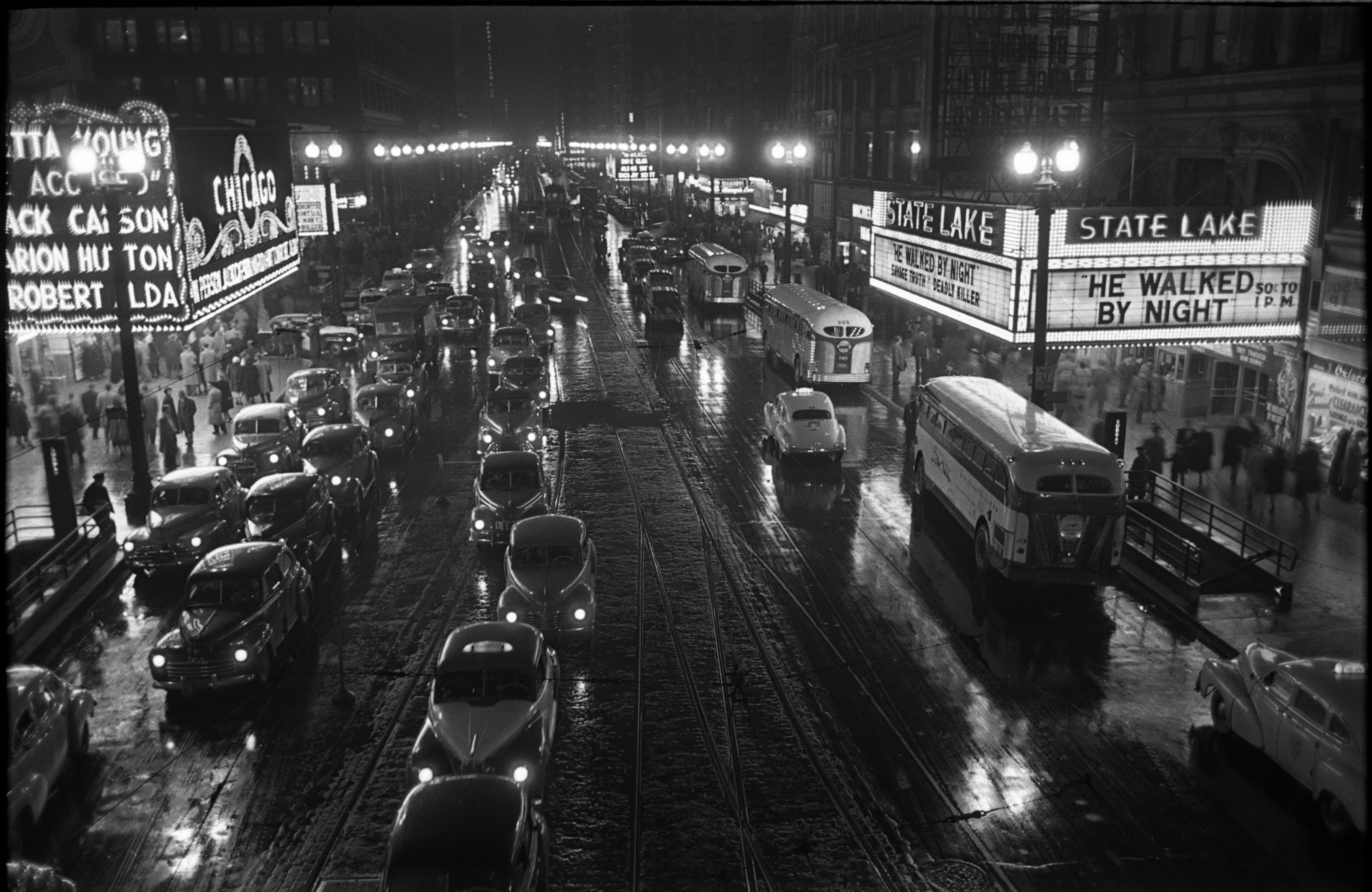
Photo of a Chicago streetscape taken by Stanley Kubrick Look magazine, 1949, from State/Lake station

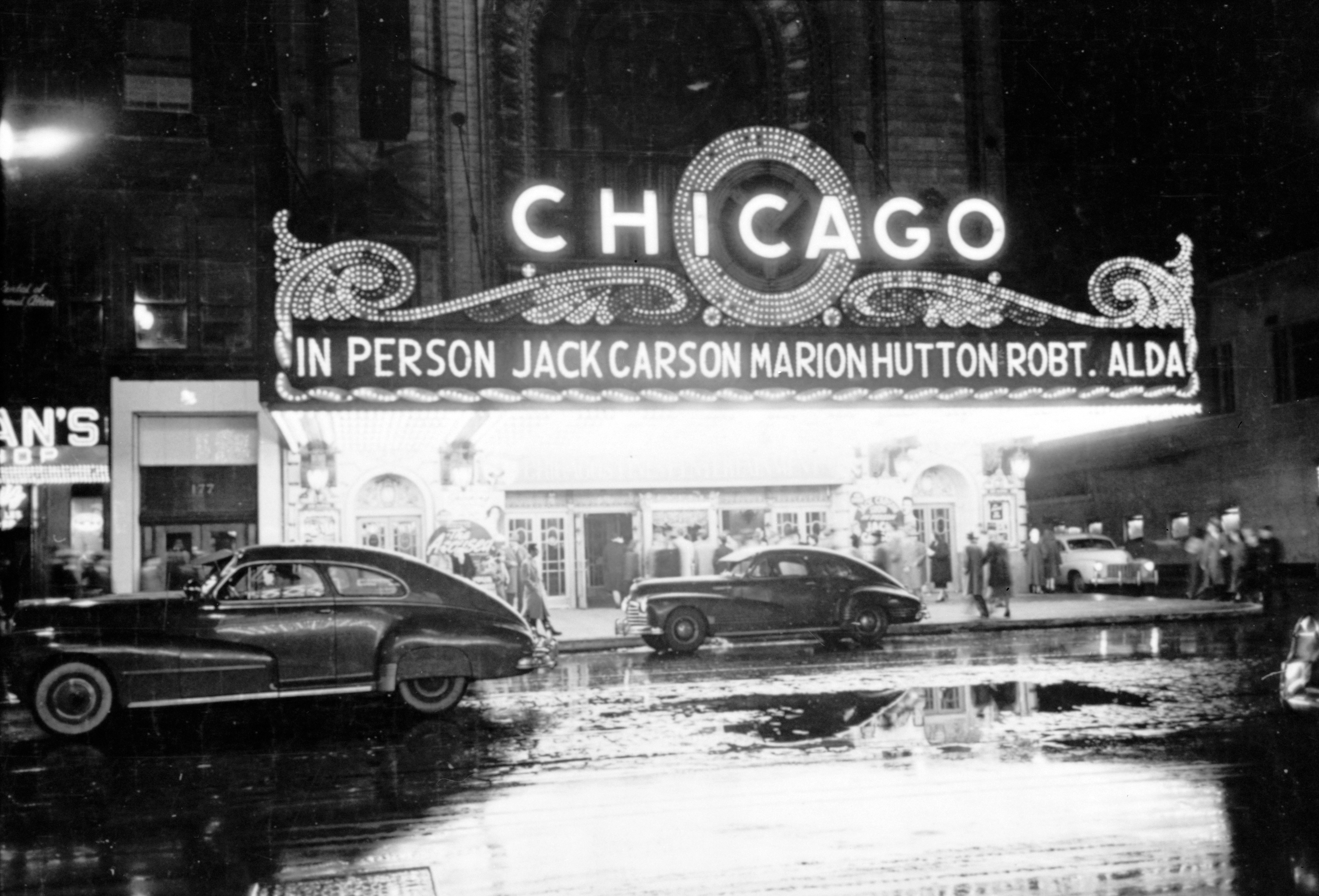
People arriving at the Chicago Theatre for a show starring, in person, Jack Carson, Marion Hutton, and Robert Alda, taken by Stanley Kubrick for Look magazine, 1949

The Jack Carson Show is an American old-time radio comedy-variety program. It was broadcast on different seasons on CBS and NBC, beginning on June 2, 1943, and ending on December 20, 1956. The program was also known as The Sealtest Village Store, sponsored by Sealtest Dairy, and the New Jack Carson Show. It was carried on the CBC Dominion network in Canada, as well. Additionally, The Jack Carson Show is the title of a television program that was broadcast on NBC from October 22, 1954, until March 11, 1955.

== Premise ==
Comedian Jack Carson played himself in a show akin to The Jack Benny Program in the way it portrayed a comedic version of the star's home life, supplemented with music. Radio historian John Dunning described Carson's characterization on the show as "generally bumbling and dumb."

A later version of the program had Carson in the role of "a very capable m.c., bantering with his supporting cast, reading an 'off-beat' item from a newspaper and recounting a humorous incident.

Originating at KNX in Los Angeles, California, the program debuted as a summer replacement for Milton Berle's show. Sponsors over the years included Campbell Soup Company, Sanka coffee, and Sealtest.

== Personnel ==
Besides Carson, regular characters on the show and the actors who portrayed them are shown in the table below.

Character	Actor
Carson's nephew, Tugwell	Dave Willock
Carson's press agent	Eddie Marr
Mrs. Freddy Martin	Agnes Moorehead
Treacher, the butler	Arthur Treacher
Norma Jean	Norma Jean Nilsson
Miss Ryan	Irene Ryan
Aunt Sally	Elizabeth Patterson
Hubert Peabody	Mel Blanc
Mrs. Foster	Jane Morgan

Others often heard on the program included Doris Drew, Maxie Rosenbloom, and Hanley Stafford.

Announcers were Del Sharbutt, Carlton KaDell, Howard Petrie, Hy Averback, and Bob Stewart. Music was led by Ray Chamberlain, Charles Dante, Walter Gross, Freddy Martin, and Johnny Richards. Singers on the show included Olga San Juan, Tony Romano, Marion Hutton, Anita Ellis, and the King Sisters.

Bill Brennan, Vick Knight, Sam Fuller, and Larry Berns were producer-directors. Sol Stein, Tom Adair, Jack Douglas, Howard Harris, Leo Solomon, Dave Swift, Leonard Levinson, Lou Fulton, and Mack Benoff were writers. Knight and Richards collaborated to compose the program's theme song, "The Moment We Met".

== Radio broadcast schedule ==
The table below gives information about when The Jack Carson Show was broadcast.

Beginning Date	Ending Date	Day of Week	Network
June 2, 1943	June 25, 1947	Wednesday	CBS
September 11, 1947	July 8, 1948	Thursday	NBC (Sealtest)
October 8, 1948	July 1, 1949	Friday	CBS
October 3, 1955	December 20, 1956	Monday- Friday	CBS

Source: On the Air: The Encyclopedia of Old-Time Radio

Note: The 1947-1948 version of the program was titled The Sealtest Village Store. Jack Carson replaced Jack Haley as lead comic in September 1947, while Eve Arden was manager.

In 1949, as part of the show, Jack Carson's radio program toured, with Jack Carson, Marion Hutton, and Robert Alda.

== Television ==
In the TV version of The Jack Carson Show, Carson was host for "a program of music, songs, and comedy sketches." Sponsored by Pontiac automobiles, the show was broadcast on Friday nights on NBC, alternating with The Red Buttons Show.

Besides Carson, regular cast members included Don Ameche, Kitty Kallen, Ray McDonald, Donald Richards, Peggy Ryan, Constance Towers, and The Asia Boys. Announcers were Bud Heistand and Ed Peck. The orchestra was led by Vic Schoen and Harry Sosnik.
