= Ernst Otto Stalinski =

Ernst Otto Stalinski (1944–2005) was a German humanist and entrepreneur. His involvement in a variety of agricultural enterprises led him to be a participant in the struggle between banana exporters Chiquita and Fyffes, dubbed the Banana Wars, in the 1990s.

Stalinski's legal cases in Honduras alleged that while representing the European company Fyffes, he became the object of strong-arm tactics by the multinational Chiquita Brands that included an alleged kidnapping attempt. When – in his opinion – the legal cases in Honduras became entangled in a web of power and corruption, his initial case was thrown out of the Honduran criminal court. He then filed a claim against the State of Honduras before the Inter-American Commission on Human Rights in Washington D.C. Stalinski v. Honduras determined that Honduras did not break the Human Rights warranties to a fair trial in the case the Supreme Court ruled close in favor of Chiquita officers.

While involved in litigation against Chiquita and its competing banana purchasing agent, Stalinski was also involved in trying to expand a business he owned making children's furniture.

He died in San Pedro Sula, Honduras, on 8 December 2005 of natural causes.
