= Patti Clayton =

American singer

Patti Clayton (mid 1940s)

Patti Clayton (February 28, 1924 in Detroit – December 11, 2003) was an American 20th century pop singer.

== Career ==
Clayton was the original voice of Miss Chiquita, the Chiquita banana singer. In 1944, bananas were an exotic fruit in America. The Chiquita banana jingle was introduced, not only to promote bananas, but to teach the public how to use and store them. With music and lyrics provided by admen Garth Montgomery, Leonard Mackenzie, and William Wirges, Clayton sang "I'm Chiquita Banana and I've come to say, bananas have to ripen in a certain way... bananas like the climate of the very very tropical equator, so you should never put bananas in the refrigerator". This was one of the most successful commercial jingles of all time, and was played up to 376 times a day on radio stations across the United States.

Clayton cut a number of transcription discs, backed by the Four Vagabonds – "Can't Get Out of This Mood", "Three Dreams", "You'd Be So Nice to Come Home To", "Why Don't You Fall In Love With Me", "Saving Myself For Bill", "Hit the Road to Dreamland", "I've Heard That Song Before", "Could It Be You", "It Can't Be Wrong" – which were used by radio stations to work Clayton and the Vagabonds into their programs, as if they were actually at the station.

Clayton is associated with Arthur Godfrey and was a regular on Arthur Godfrey Time, which ran on both radio and television from 1945 to 1972. She was married to Godfrey's director, Saul Ochs. She appeared on other programs such as National Barn Dance, Club Fifteen, Melody Lane With Jerry Wayne, Bouquet For You, and Sing It Again. She hosted her own 15-minute variety program, Waitin' For Clayton (also known as The Patti Clayton Show), which ran on CBS Radio from 1945 to 1947.

== Discography ==
=== Singles ===
- "Let's Sail to Dreamland"
- "You Won't Be Satisfied (Until You Break My Heart)" (1945)
- "That's Where I Came In" (1946)
- "Guilty" (1946)
- "Ole Buttermilk Sky" (1946)
- "Linda" (1947)

=== Albums ===
- Four Vagabonds – Complete Recorded Works (1941-1951) Vol. 2 1942/43 (1999, Document Records DOCD-5636; Clayton sings lead on nine of the 24 tracks)

Compilations

- Various artists: Discovered, Volume 9 (2015, Recollect; Clayton sings the Chiquita banana jingle)
