= Total Produce =

Irish food company

Total Produce plc
- Industry: Fresh produce
- Founded: 2006
- Defunct: 2021
- Fate: Merged
- Successor: Dole Food Company
- Headquarters: Dundalk, County Louth
- Key people: Carl McCann (Chairman); Rory Byrne (CEO)
- Revenue: € 3,729.3 million (2019)
- Operating income: € 82.3 million (2019)
- Net income: € 66.2 million (2019)
- Number of employees: 6,005 (2019)
- Website: www.totalproduce.com

Total Produce plc was an Irish producer of fresh produce. It was formed from the demerger of a division of Fyffes and listed on the Irish Stock Exchange and the London Stock Exchange. It bought into and then merged with another major food producer, Dole.

== History ==
The company was established by way of a demerger of the fresh produce business of Fyffes in 2006. It secured listings on the Irish Stock Exchange in Dublin and the Alternative Investment Market in London in 2007. It bought a 60% stake in two Dutch fresh produce distributors, Haluco and Nedalpac, in 2008.

In February 2018, Total Produce acquired a 45 percent equity stake in Dole Food Company. For antitrust reasons, Total Produce agreed to divest Saba Fresh Cuts in Sweden and Finland to Bama Gruppen.

On 30 July 2021, Total Produce plc merged with Dole Food Company, Inc under the new name "Dole plc."

== Produce ==
The company's range includes deciduous fruits, tropical fruits, citrus fruits, salads, stone fruits and vegetables.
