= Citrosuco =

Citrosuco S.A.
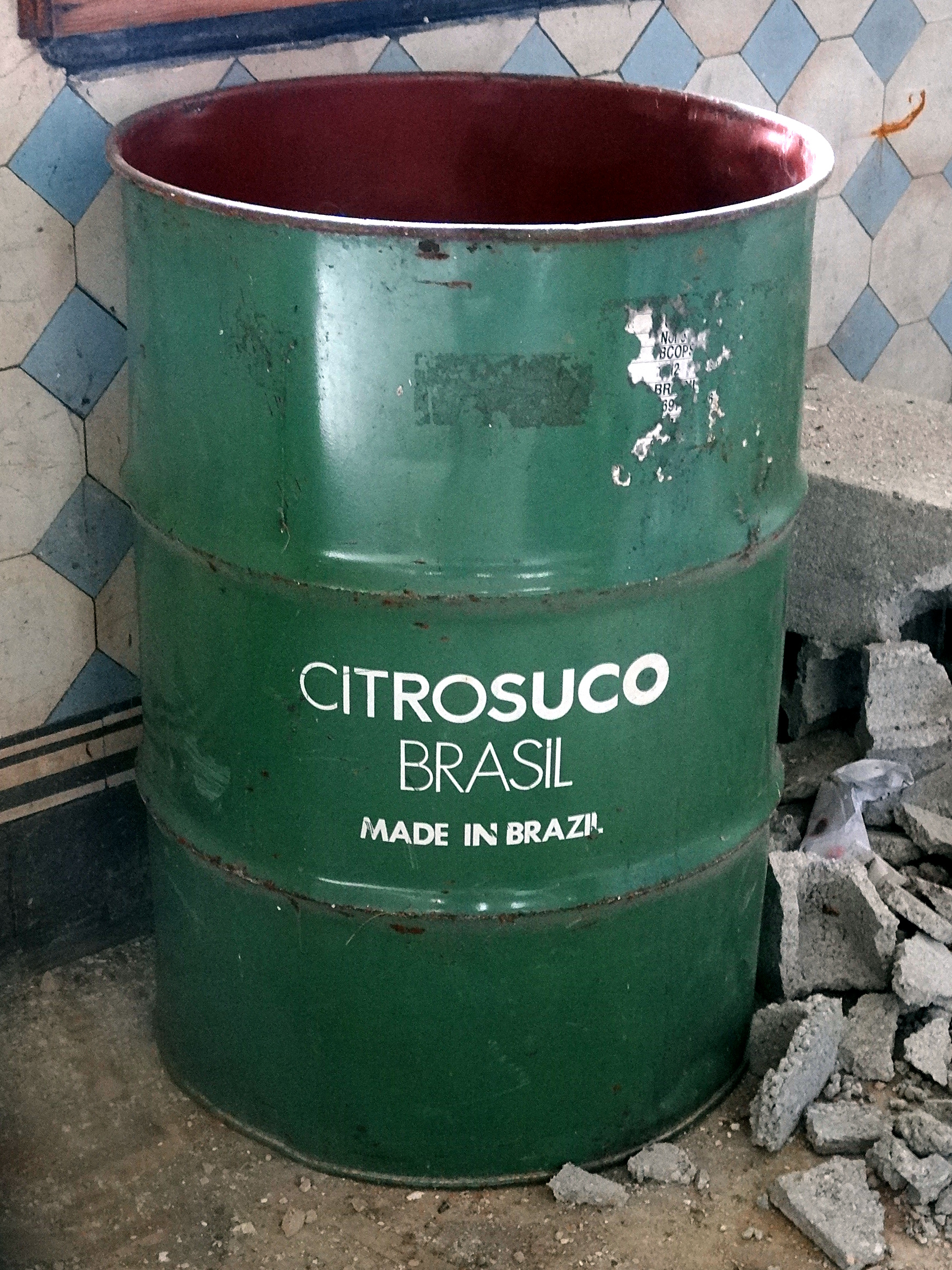
- Company type: Private
- Industry: Agri-business
- Founded: 2010
- Headquarters: Matão, Brazil
- Products: Orange juice Essential oil Limonene
- Parent: Votorantim Group
- Website: www.citrosuco.com.br

Citrosuco is the largest global producer of orange juice concentrate, with about 45% of the product market in Brazil and 25% in the world. In addition to juice, sales include industrialized orange by-products such as essential oils and animal feed. The company is headquartered in Matão, Brazil and is a subsidiary of Votorantim Group, a São Paulo-based industrial conglomerate. Citrosuco has offices in Brazil, the United States, Germany, Japan and Belgium. Its main competitor is the Brazilian firm Cutrale.

On May 17, 2010, Citrosuco/Fischer and Citrovita announced that they would merge under the Citrovita banner. In December 2011, Brazilian authorities approved the merger.

== History ==
Citrosuco was created in 1963 by Pasco Packing Company, Eckes, and Fischer Group. By 1969, Fischer Group acquired Pasco’s shares, and in 1992 acquired Eckes’ shares in the business.

Citrovita was founded in 1989 as one of the business units of the Votorantim Group. It began its activities with a production unit in Catanduva in the state of São Paulo and on its own orange grove in Itapetininga.
