= Leonard Levinson =

American radio writer and author (1904–1974)

Leonard Louis Levinson (March 2, 1904 - January 30, 1974) was an American radio writer and author.

== Early years ==
Levinson was born in Pittsburgh, Pennsylvania, the son of Naimon and Sophie Levinson. He had two brothers, Stanley and Robert M. Levinson. While a student at Fifth Avenue High School in Pittsburgh, he was a star in baseball, ice hockey, and track, accumulating 13 sports letters. He also was president of the literary and debate organizations and business manager of the school publication. After high school, he studied radio engineering at Carnegie Tech and followed that with a study of drama at the University of Pittsburgh. He later attended the University of California at Los Angeles and worked at a newspaper while he was enrolled there .

== Career ==
In 1925 Levinson opened a publicity and advertising bureau in Los Angeles to "specialize in the exploitation of commercial firms" and to work with national advertising for manufacturers in southern California. After working in Hollywood for the trade publication Variety for several years, Levinson joined the Hillman-Shane Advertising Agency, Incorporated, heading a new department as director of publicity. In that role he oversaw public relations for film personalities and film companies. He wrote "many screen originals" and was involved in production of Broadway Melody, Holiday Revue, and other films.

=== Radio and television ===
By 1939, Levinson had begun writing for radio. One of the earliest programs to use his scripts was Joe Penner's Tip Top Show in 1939. In 1940 he became an assistant writer to Don Quinn on Fibber McGee and Molly, and in 1941 he began writing for The Great Gildersleeve. He resigned from that position in 1942 to work for the United States Office of War Information. The trade publication Variety reported that he had already been "active for some years in Hollywood in pro-democracy radio propaganda", including unsuccessfully seeking approval from the federal government to "overcome cautions of sponsors against gags against Axis, etc.". After he worked for the government, he wrote for more radio programs, including Hollywood Showcase, Theater of the Air, The Al Jolson-Monty Woolley Show, The Jack Carson Show, The Stu Erwin Show, and Family Theatre. Television programs for which Levinson wrote included Success Story and Sure As Fate.

=== Stage ===
Levinson wrote for the stage as early as age 23, when he wrote the book and lyrics for a revue in which Fanny Brice, Lupe Velez, and others appeared. He wrote the books for two Broadway productions, Rhapsody (1944) Mr. Strauss Goes to Boston (1945). He was technical director for the national tour of The Desert Song.

=== Practical jokes ===
Levinson's practical jokes sometimes turned into more than what they seemed. When Olsen and Johnson were performing in Los Angeles, Levinson sent two bales of hay to the theater, and the next day he sent a goat to eat the hay. The comedy duo incorporated the goat and the hay into the act, after which, "... an agency executive seeing them act the fool put them on a network program. Then came a vaudeville tour of an act called Hellzapoppin' and from that grew their show, in which goats — in fact anything — may appear at any moment."

Another of Levinson's gags led to creation of his own film business. He created letterhead for the fictitious Impossible Pictures, Inc., with the first press release announcing the company's trademark. The next release revealed the company's cable address, after which he sent telegrams containing the company's motto. A subsequent news release promoted a lavish party that was suddenly called off, and a 10-page messenger-delivered statement of the company's policy consisted of "Blah, Blah, Blah ..." for all 10 pages. Eventually Levinson decided to venture into the film business for real, joining with theater chain owner Dave Flexer. Impossible Pictures' first effort was a parody of travelogues. Levinson's joking continued with the real-life company as the first film took on several humorous titles during production. One promotion was a contest that required completing a sentence that began, "I Hate Impossible Pictures Because ..." Eligibility was limited to people living inside the city limits of Hollywood. A second contest invited people to submit new slogans for the company with the grand prize being a free sightseeing trip around Hollywood. Levinson selected his secretary as the winner, giving her an afternoon off work and a dime to pay bus fare. Beginning on July 1, 1948, the company released four cartoons via an arrangement with Republic. The premiere of the four cartoons occurred on a Los Angeles streetcar, with the vehicle proceeding "on its predetermined course through downtown Los Angeles while the films were unreeled."

=== Books ===
Levinson wrote the books Bartlett's Unfamiliar Quotations, Webster's Unafraid Dictionary, Wall Street: A Pictorial History, The Left-Handed Dictionary, and 12 cookbooks.

== Personal life and death ==
Levinson had a wife, Ruth, and two daughters. He died in Los Angeles on January 30, 1974, aged 69.
