= Lorenzo Dow Baker =

American sailor (1840–1908)

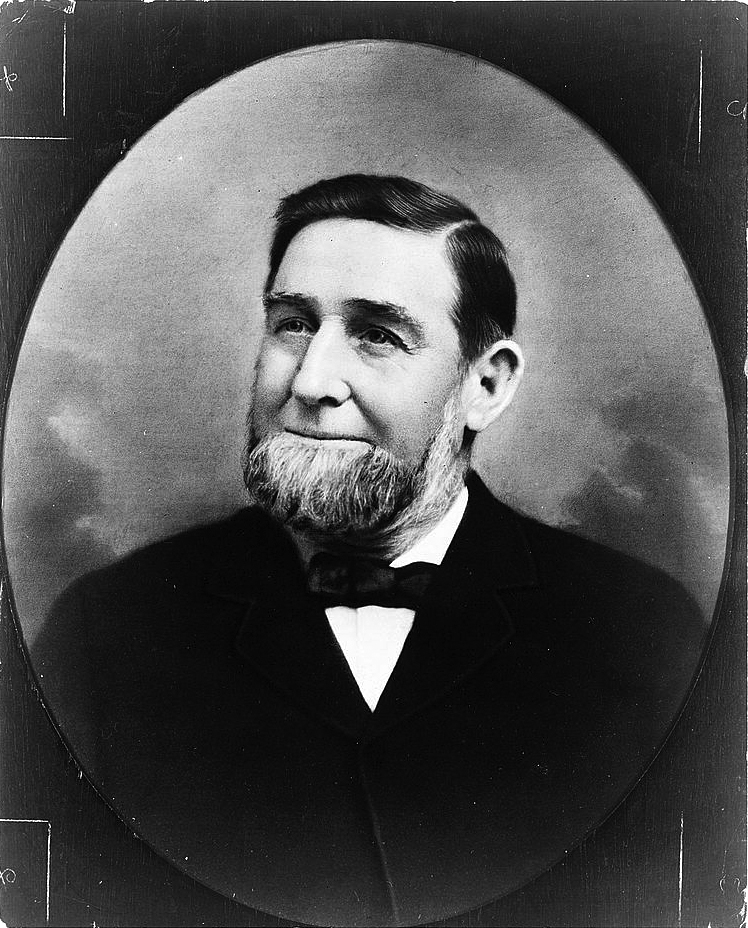
Lorenzo Dow Baker

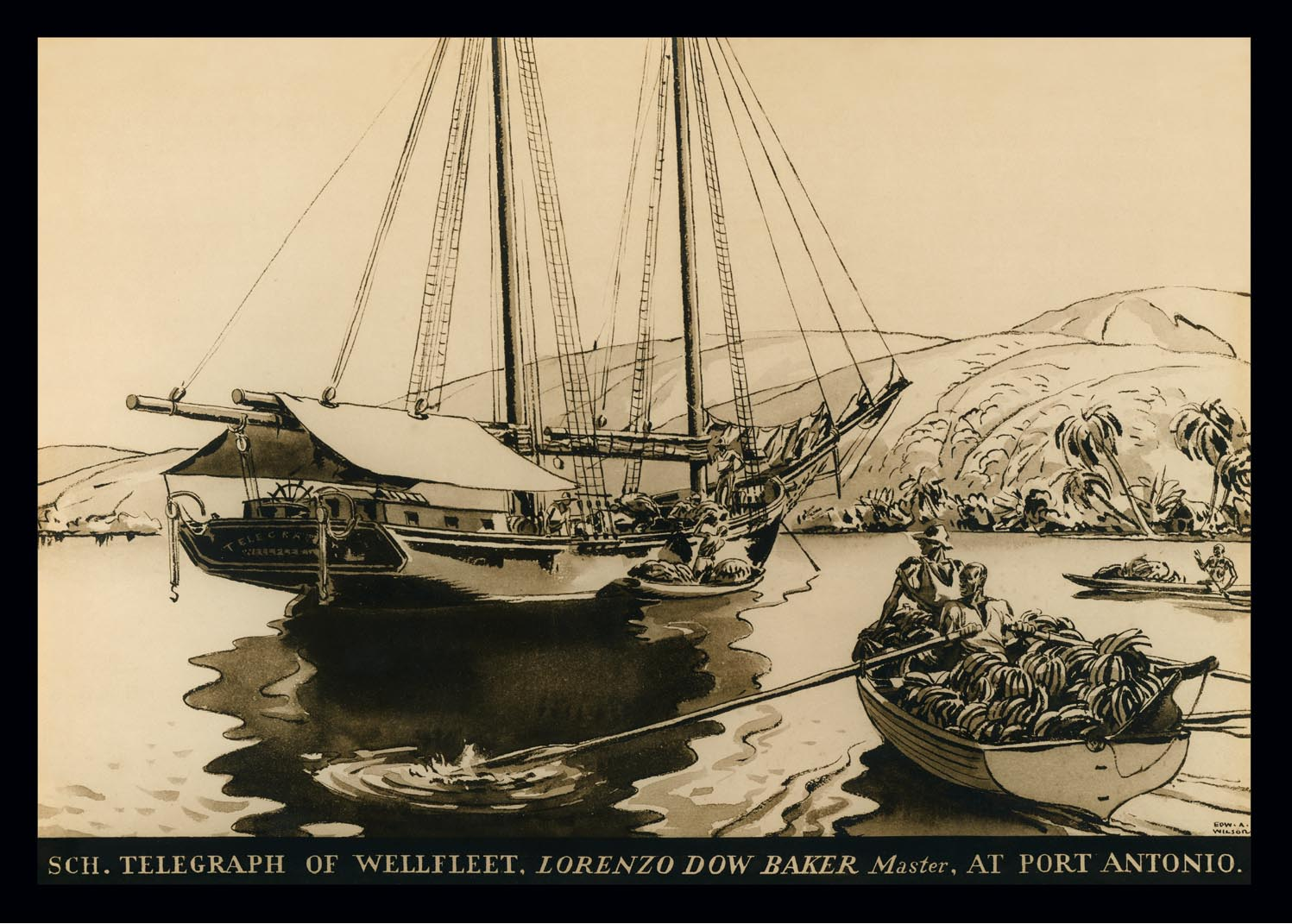
Schooner Telegraph

Lorenzo Dow Baker (March 15, 1840 – June 21, 1908) was an American sailor, ship's captain and businessman whose 1870 voyage from the Orinoco to Jamaica and then to Philadelphia launched the modern banana production industry. In 1881 he partnered with his brother-in-law Elisha Hopkins to form L.D. Baker & Co. In 1885 he joined forces with Andrew W. Preston and eight others to form the Boston Fruit Company, which led to several successive partnerships, ending in the 1899 formation of the United Fruit Company, now Chiquita Brands International.

Baker's success caused Wellfleet to become a summer resort.

Baker left a fortune of $4 million (equivalent to $143,333,333 in 2025) upon his death in 1908.

== Early life ==
Baker was born on March 15, 1840 in Wellfleet, Massachusetts and grew up in Cape Cod where he gravitated towards fishing. He worked as a fisherman along the New England coastlines. Local residents referred to Baker as a natural leader. He was known as a devout, hardworking young man who also enjoyed sailing. Although his travels took him outside the United States, Baker retained his legal residency in Wellfleet until in death in 1908.

== Career ==
In 1870, Baker embarked on a voyage aboard the fishing schooner Telegraph, departing from Jamaica with a cargo of 160 bunches of bananas. Upon reaching Jersey City, he strategically stowed the bananas on deck and awaited favorable winds. His foresight proved advantageous, as he successfully arrived in New Jersey 11 days later. Subsequently, he sold his cargo at a profit of $2.00 per bunch. In 1885, Baker established a partnership with Andrew Preston and other investors, subsequently naming it the Boston Fruit Company in 1890. By 1892, having established banana plantations in Jamaica, his company garnered a steady supply of the fruit. Baker and his partners also formed the Fruit Dispatch Company. In 1899, in an agreement with Minor Cooper Keith, the company along with Keith's three banana companies merged to become the newly formed United Fruit Company.Under the newly formed company, the business was expanded with production properties in Central and South America.

== Personal life ==
Baker was father to a sons, Lorenzo D. Baker Jr., Joshua H. Baker, Reuben R. Baker and daughter, Martha Alberta Baker. Baker owned Belvedere, a family plantation in Jamaica near Morant Bay that is documented as being in possession of his family as late as World War II. According to The Boston Globe, Baker also lived in an upscale hotel when in Boston. Upon his death, Baker's wealth was distributed among his relatives in Wellfleet in accordance with his will.
