= Banana production in the United States =

Commercial banana production in the United States is relatively limited in scale and economic impact. While Americans eat 26 pounds (12 kg) of bananas per person per year, the vast majority of the fruit is imported from other countries, chiefly Central and South America, where the US has previously occupied areas containing banana plantations, and controlled the importation of bananas via various fruit companies, such as Dole and Chiquita.

== History ==
The first commercial banana farm in the United States was established in Florida, near Silver Lake, in 1876. It is known that Ponce de Leon brought bananas to Florida in the early 1500s. A number of independent banana farms and cultivars have been located in a number of areas, reaching as far north as the southern Midwest and Ohio River. This region equates roughly with the northernmost terminus of the subtropical crop-growing region of the US, which ends at about Cincinnati, Ohio, and further east in cities and locations such as Philadelphia, Pennsylvania, New York City and Long Island in New York, and coastal regions of southern New England. Banana growth further west along this ecological transition line, such as in central to northern Missouri and northern Kansas/far southern Nebraska is highly dubious and uncertain, due to extreme temperature fluctuations and an increase in aridity.

Other states that have been popular locations for independent banana farming have been Georgia, Louisiana, South Carolina, Mississippi, Arkansas, Texas, Oklahoma, Alabama, North Carolina, Hawaii, Virginia, Arizona, California, Nevada, and Maryland. Florida has seen a number of independent and big-name banana cultivars inhabit its land throughout history.

Bananas have also been cultivated in states of the Pacific Northwest, including in areas of Washington, Oregon, and various highland areas and sheltered oceanic/temperate valleys in southern Idaho.

In the 70s, a variety of bananas, including Ice Cream and Cavendish, were commonly grown throughout the Appalachian region, primarily throughout sheltered mountain valleys in the east of Tennessee and north Georgia.

== Current production ==
Hawaii is by far the largest banana producer in the United States, followed by Florida. Banana plantation in Hawaii has followed a descending trend, from 29 million pounds (13 thousand long tons; 15 thousand short tons) in 2000 to 17.8 million pounds (7.9 thousand long tons; 8.9 thousand short tons) in 2010, and 4.7 million pounds (2.1 thousand long tons; 2.4 thousand short tons) in 2023. Hawaii produces mainly the conventional Cavendish assortment and the Hawaiian apple banana, which are sold in the local markets due to high employment and land expenses. The chief US banana exporter is Florida, which produces mostly Thai and cooking bananas (Bluggoe type). In addition, US banana producers are looking for opportunities in the organic and specialty segments of the banana market in Florida, Texas, California, Mississippi, Alabama, South Carolina, and Georgia. Banana cultivation in Florida has been about 500 acres, valued at roughly 2 million US dollars.

Other states that remain popular locations for independent banana farming, which usually only export on a highly domestic level, are Georgia, Louisiana, Mississippi, Arkansas, Texas, Oklahoma, Alabama, South Carolina, North Carolina, Virginia, Arizona, and California. These states produce a variety depending on the region, including Cavendish, Bluggoe, Ice Cream, Goldfinger, Lady Finger, Red Dacca, Latundan, Pisano Awak, and Balbisinia subtypes.

Independent banana cultivation in the United States is diverse, with some areas of the country able to sustain fields of a wide variety of banana trees perennially or near-perennially, similar to a plantation system. This is most notable (outside of Florida and Hawaii) in Texas, Louisiana, California, Arizona, Mississippi, Georgia, Alabama, South Carolina, and coastal North Carolina. In other areas of the country (northern Arkansas, southern Missouri, mountain Tennessee, southern Kansas, the far southern Midwest and along the Ohio River, Kentucky, and Virginia,) containing a climate similar to that of the banana growing region of inland south-central and eastern China (Sichuan, Anhui, Zhejiang, Hubei, Jiangsu, Henan, Jiangxi, Hunan, Chongqing, and Guizhou provinces,) banana cultivation is more seasonal.

Bananas are also grown commercially in Puerto Rico, Guam, and American Samoa.

== See also ==
- Banana § Modern cultivation
