= History of peasant banana production in the Americas =

The production of bananas for export is largely dominated by large commercial companies such as Chiquita or Dole. The Caribbean, and particularly the Windward Islands, are notable for the production of bananas by small holders for export.

Peasant banana producers focus their attention on the popular Cavendish banana, as these are the fruit of choice on markets in Europe. In the Caribbean, and especially in Dominica where this sort of cultivation is widespread, holdings are in the 1 to 2 acre range. Farmers supplement their income from other crops, engaging in labor outside the farm, or from a share of the earnings of relatives living overseas. This style of cultivation often was popular in the islands as bananas required little labor input and provided source of income. Vulnerability to hurricanes in particular is also a problem.

== NAFTA ==
Trade agreements such as NAFTA in the 1990 altered the economic conditions for small scale peasant producers. The costs of production were relatively high and the ending of favorable tariff and other supports, especially in the European Economic Community, made it difficult for peasant producers to compete with the bananas grown on large plantations by the well capitalized firms like Chiquita and Dole. Large companies benefit from access to lower-cost labor and are able to afford modern agronomic advances such as fertilization, The "dollar banana" produced by these companies made the profit margins for peasant bananas unsustainable.

== Fair trade ==
Caribbean countries have attempted to address the problems by providing government supported agronomic services and helping to organize producers' cooperatives. These countries have supported the Fair Trade movement, which seeks to balance the inequities in the world trade in commodities.
