= Boston Fruit Company =

American company (1885–1899)

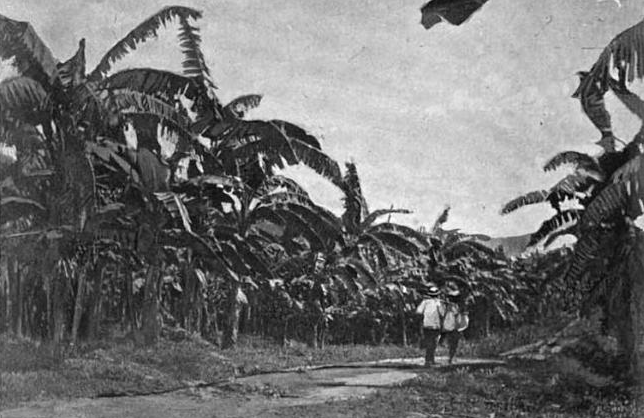
- Boston Fruit Company's "Golden Vale" plantation, Jamaica, c. 1894.
- Industry: Fruit production and import
- Founded: 1885; 141 years ago
- Founders: Lorenzo D. Baker; Andrew W. Preston
- Defunct: 1899; 127 years ago
- Successor: United Fruit Company
- Headquarters: Long Wharf, Boston, Massachusetts, United States

The Boston Fruit Company (1885–1899) was a fruit production and import business based in the port of Boston, Massachusetts. Andrew W. Preston and nine others established the firm to ship bananas and other fruit from the West Indies to north-eastern America. At the time, the banana was "considered a rare and delicious treat" in the United States. The major challenge for all banana importers was to get the highly perishable fruit to the American market before it spoiled." Ship captain Lorenzo Dow Baker served as president of the company and manager of the tropical division. By 1895 "the corporation own[ed] nearly 40,000 acres, included in 35 plantations, and deep-water frontage [in Jamaica] in the harbors of Port Antonio and Port Morant. They owned their own lines of steamships, which they operated between those ports and Boston, Philadelphia and Baltimore. Besides carrying their own fruits, they carried some outside freight, and afford passenger accommodations for many tourists visiting the West-India Islands."

== Boston ==
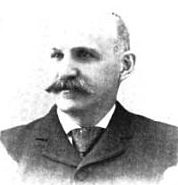
Andrew Preston, Boston manager, ca.1894

In Boston, "Long Wharf [was] the headquarters of the tropical fruit trade, and here the Boston Fruit Company, an association of Boston merchants and West India fruit-growers, receive their cargoes of bananas, cocoanuts, oranges, lemons, and kindred fruits." In 1888 "a recent Boston paper, referring to new tropical fruits for that market, [said]: 'Two new varieties of tropical fruit will be introduced into this market by the middle of May, by the Boston Fruit Company; namely, mangoes and the avocado pear. The latter, which is ordinary pear shaped, is as large as an English pound pear, and weighs from one to two pounds. When ripe the fruit is generally green, but sometimes it is streaked. After they have been gathered a few days they become soft and may be eaten with pepper and salt. The avocado tastes somewhat like butter or marrow and hence it is called vegetable marrow.'"

By 1890 "the Boston Fruit Company has got fully into work for the season, and steamers are now running regularly between Jamaica and Boston. As yet the cargoes are principally confined to bananas and cocoanuts. During April this company imported 9,077 cases and 44,202 boxes of oranges, and 39,354 boxes of lemons, together with 163,779 bunches of bananas."

== Jamaica ==
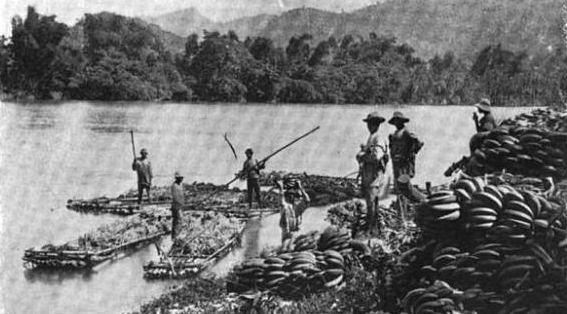
Transport of banana crop, Jamaica, 1894

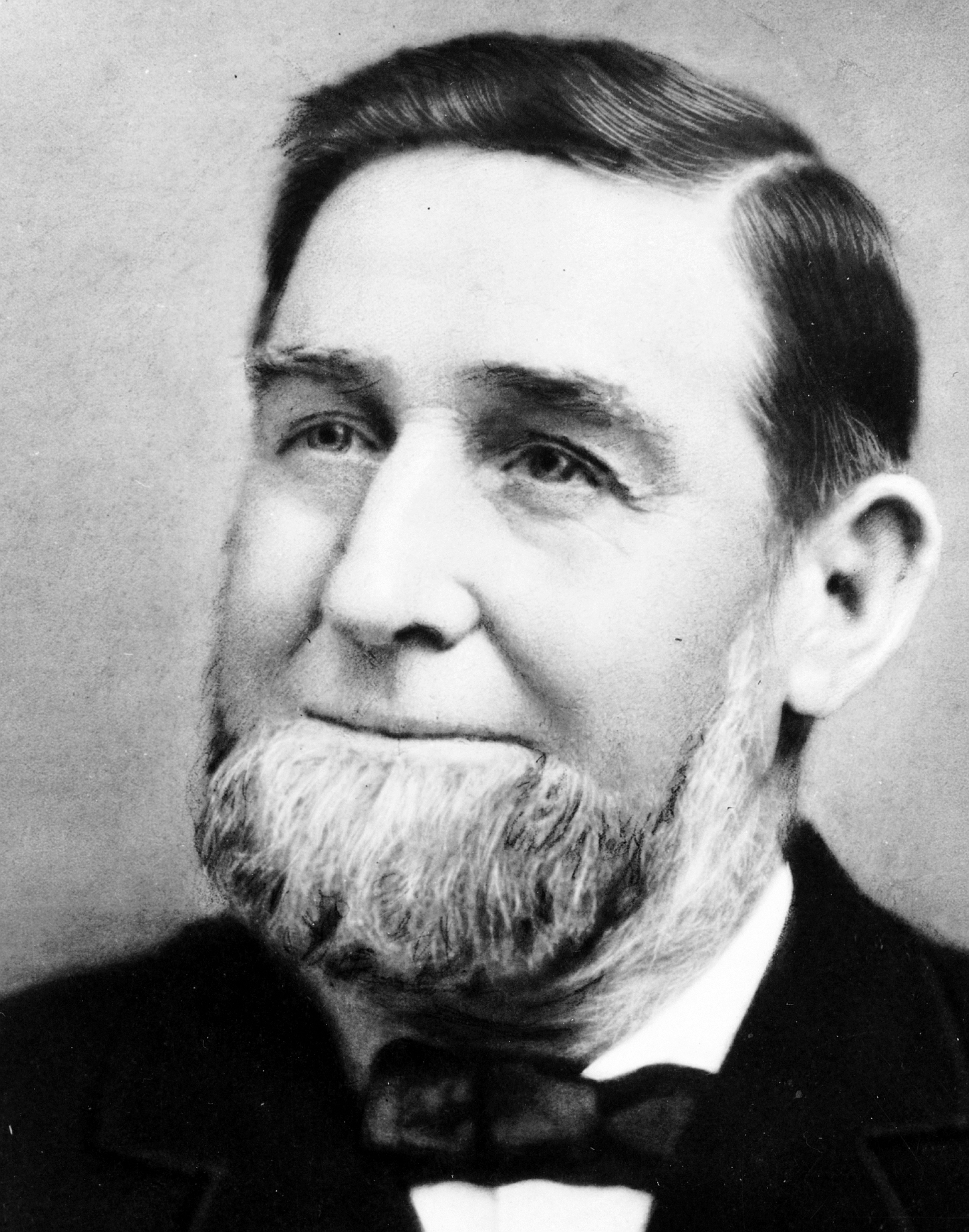
L.D. Baker, tropical manager

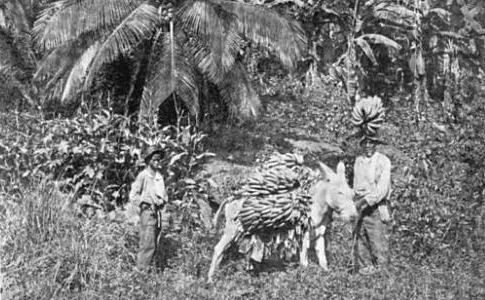
Transport of banana crop, Jamaica, 1894

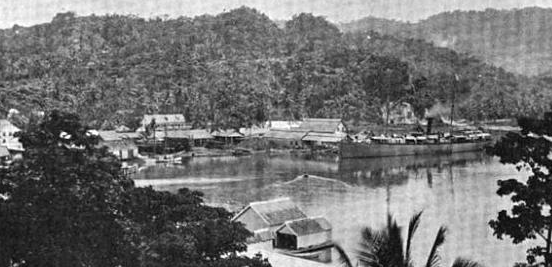
Wharves in Port Antonio, Jamaica, 1894

"Andrew Preston chose the West Indies as the site for his entry into the banana exporting business. The Boston Fruit Co. also moved into the production end of the business when it bought plantations in Jamaica. The fact that ... Preston owned [the] sources of supply differentiated [him] from others in the business. Until then, it was unheard of for companies to deal at the supply end of the banana trade." "Along the northeastern and eastern coast of the island of Jamaica, extensive tracts of land are cultivated by the natives, on which are raised the yellow Jamaica banana. The Boston Fruit Company own about 10,000 acres of this land, and under the supervision of Capt. Baker, who resides there, bananas are raised for the Company's use. Since the cultivation of Jamaica fruit has been taken into the hands of Boston parties, the quality has improved steadily, and this year handlers of this fruit claim that the quality is the best that ever came from there, and they attribute this to the careful handling of the bananas all along the line, as well as their careful cultivation."

"Correspondence between Andrew Preston ... and his buying agents in Jamaica reveals the former's concerns with maintaining quality in a competitive market place: '[T]he time is past when importers can make a profit on thin and ordinary fruit ... and I trust our Jamaica people will keep it in mind at all times.'" In a subsequent letter, Preston acknowledged that his emphasis on quality was causing tension within the company but he refused to lower his standards: "I presume your people [in Jamaica] think we are disposed to criticize your selections but we are driven to it by the power of competition - naturally our best customers want the best fruit and I assure you we find it difficult to hold them with fruit of poorer quality than our competitors offer them. It is very plain to my mind that the successful company of the future is the one that controls the growing of its own fruit."

"Shipping agents graded fruit bunches by the number of hands, the fullness of the individual fruits, and the outward appearance of the peels. As late as the 1880s, a fruit bunch of seven or more hands was considered a 'first,' meaning that it received the highest going market price. Bunches with six or fewer hands were second or third grade fruit for which growers generally received less money. By the 1890s, shippers such as the Boston Fruit Company were raising the standard 'bunch count' to eight and nine hands, a shift that favored varieties such as the Gros Michel that tended to produce high bunch counts when grown under favorable agroecological conditions. Increasingly, fruit graders discounted and/or rejected seven- and six-hand bunches particularly during seasonal lulls in demand. Fruit bunches with scars, bruises, or other blemishes were also subject to discounting and outright rejection."

== Shipping ==
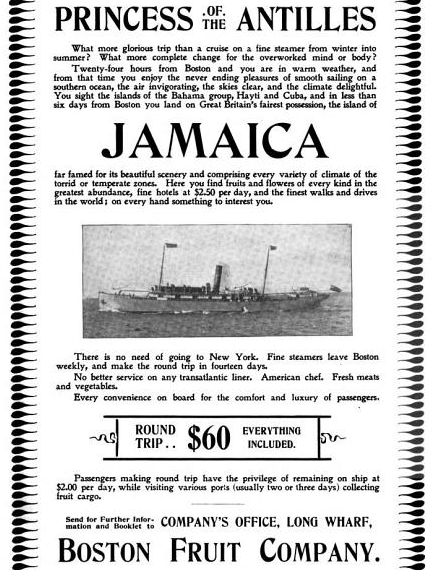
Advertisement for travel by ship between Boston and Jamaica, Boston Fruit Co., 1897

"Previous to 1883 the Jamaica bananas were transported in schooners, but in 1883 two steamers were put on between Boston and that place. ... In 1886 a new steamer was added to the line, and that year these steamers made twenty-six trips. In 1887 four steamers were running by the first of March, beginning a month earlier than previously, and the steamers have been running ever since. Last winter was the first one that fruit steamers ever came to Boston, and owing to that fact, since January 1, 114,963 bunches of Jamaica bananas have been brought to Boston, whereas during the same time last year only 24,042 bunches were received in this city. From March to November a steamer from Jamaica arrives every ten days, and from November to March every two weeks. In the winter time, when the weather is very cold, the Boston Fruit Company have a heating room which is kept at a temperature of about sixty degrees, and in this room may be put 10,000 bunches of bananas. Jamaica bananas are sold from the ship for from $1.40 to $1.50 per bunch for number ones, and for eighty cents per bunch for number twos, and third class bananas bring from forty to fifty cents. The prices are about forty per cent lower than last year, and it is claimed that the fruit is of much better quality, making a virtual decrease of over forty per cent in the prices of bananas in comparison to last year's figures."

During the Spanish–American War of 1898, some of the ships of the Boston Fruit Co. were re-purposed for war-related functions.

== United Fruit Company ==
"By integrating production, shipping, and marketing, Preston believed that a company could more effectively regulate both the quantity and quality of the fruit reaching U.S. markets and thereby reduce the financial risks associated with trading a highly perishable commodity. In 1899, Preston helped to transform his vision into reality by playing a central role in the formation of the United Fruit Company."

In 1899 Preston formed an agreement with Minor C. Keith, and merged the enterprise into the newly created United Fruit Company. "In March 1899 the United Fruit Company was formed through the consolidation of the Boston Fruit Company, obtaining fruit from the West Indies, and the companies headed by Minor C. Keith, which secured their bananas from Central America and Santa Marta, Colombia." Decades later, United Fruit was merged with Eli M. Black's AMK in 1970 to become the United Brands Company. In 1984, United Brands became Chiquita Brands International.

== See also ==
- United Fruit Company
- Alfred Constantine Goffe
