= SA8000 =

International standard for social accountability management systems

Social Accountability 8000 (SA 8000) is an international standard for social accountability management systems. It was developed in 1997 by Social Accountability International, formerly the Council on Economic Priorities Accreditation Agency, by an advisory board consisting of trade unions, NGOs, civil society organizations and companies. The SA 8000's criteria were developed from various industry and corporate codes to create a common standard for social welfare compliance. The goal of the standard is to encourage organizations to develop, maintain, and apply socially acceptable practices in the workplace, and to be able to provide assurance to external parties that social accountability is being effectively implemented by an organisation. The standard was designed to fit into an integrated management system.

== History ==
SA8000 was initially developed in 1997 by Social Accountability International, formerly the Council on Economic Priorities Accreditation Agency. The current (2014) version of the standard is built on earlier 2001, 2004 and 2008 versions. As of September 2025, a working draft is in place which is intended to become a new 2026 standard.

== Performance criteria ==
The standard requires compliance with eight performance criteria.

- Child Labor: No use or support of child labor; policies and written procedures for remediation of children found to be working in situation; provide adequate financial and other support to enable such children to attend school; and employment of young workers conditional.
- Forced and Compulsory Labor: No use or support for forced or compulsory labor; no required 'deposits' - financial or otherwise; no withholding salary, benefits, property or documents to force personnel to continue work; personnel right to leave premises after workday; personnel free to terminate their employment; and no use nor support for human trafficking.
- Health and Safety: Provide a healthy and safe workplace; prevent potential occupational accidents; appoint senior manager to ensure OHS; instruction on OHS for all personnel; system to detect, avoid, respond to risks; record all accidents; provide personal protection equipment and medical attention in event of work-related injury; remove, reduce risks to new and expectant mothers; hygiene: toilet, potable water, sanitary food storage; decent dormitories: clean, safe, meet basic needs; and workers' rights to remove from imminent danger.
- Freedom of Association and Right to Collective Bargaining: Respect the right to form and join trade unions and bargain collectively. All personnel are free to: organize trade unions of their choice; and bargain collectively with their employer. A company should respect right to organize unions and bargain collectively; not interfere in workers’ organizations or collective bargaining; inform personnel of these rights and freedom from retaliation; where law restricts rights, allow workers freely elect representatives; ensure no discrimination against personnel engaged in worker organizations; and ensure representatives access to workers at the workplace.
- Discrimination: No discrimination based on race, national or social origin, caste, birth, religion, disability, gender, sexual orientation, union membership, political opinions and age. No discrimination in hiring, remuneration, access to training, promotion, termination, and retirement. No interference with exercise of personnel tenets or practices; prohibition of threatening, abusive, exploitative, coercive behavior at workplace or company facilities; no pregnancy or virginity tests under any circumstances.
- Disciplinary Practices: Treat all personnel with dignity and respect; zero tolerance of corporal punishment, mental or physical abuse of personnel; no harsh or inhumane treatment.
- Working Hours: Compliance with laws and industry standards; normal workweek, not including overtime, shall not exceed 48 hours; 1 day off following every 6 consecutive work days, with some exceptions; overtime is voluntary, not regular, not more than 12 hours per week; required overtime only if negotiated in CBA.
- Remuneration: Respect right of personnel to living wage; all workers paid at least legal minimum wage; wages sufficient to meet basic needs & provide discretionary income; deductions not for disciplinary purposes, with some exceptions; wages and benefits clearly communicated to workers; paid in convenient manner – cash or check form; overtime paid at premium rate; prohibited use of labor-only contracting, short-term contracts, false apprenticeship schemes to avoid legal obligations to personnel.

Certification is granted by independent certification bodies that are accredited and overseen by Social Accountability Accreditation Services (SAAS). There are 23 accredited certifications bodies worldwide. Statistics are reported quarterly and posted on the SAAS website. As of June 30, 2013, there were 3,231 certified facilities, employing a total of 1,862,936 workers, across 72 countries and 65 industrial sectors.

== Certification ==
SA 8000 certification has criteria that require that organizations seeking to gain and maintain certification must go beyond simple compliance to the standard. Prospective organizations must integrate it into their management practices and demonstrate ongoing compliance with the standard. SA 8000 is based on the principles of the human rights norms as described in International Labour Organization conventions, the United Nations Convention on the Rights of the Child and the Universal Declaration of Human Rights. It measures the performance of companies in eight areas important to social accountability in the workplace: child labour, forced labour, health and safety, free association and collective bargaining, discrimination, disciplinary practices, working hours and compensation.

== See also ==
- Social accountability
