= Fyffes =

Japanese-owned food company

Fyffes plc
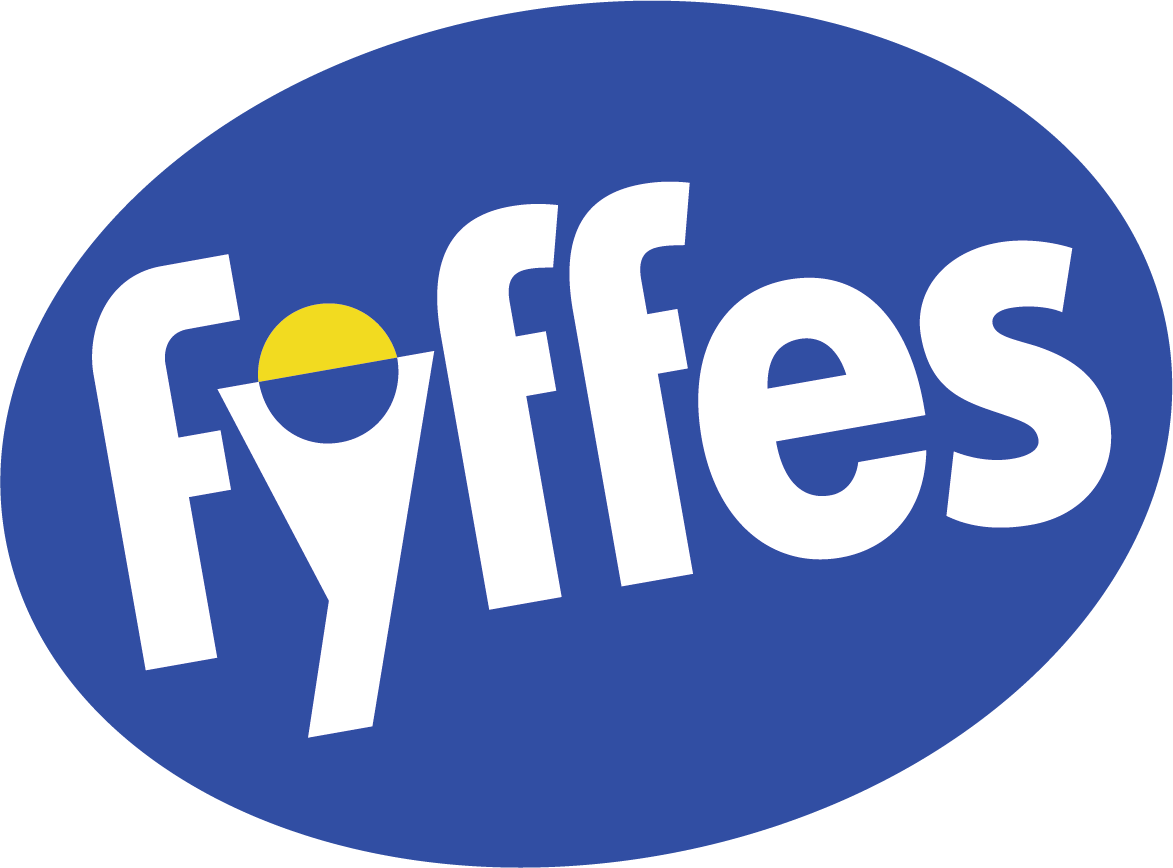
- Type: Private
- Industry: Produce
- Founded: 1888 in London, United Kingdom
- Founder: Edward Wathen Fyffe
- Headquarters: Geneva, Switzerland
- Key people: Helge H. Sparsø CEO
- Products: Fruit: bananas, pineapples
- Revenue: €1.09 billion (2014)
- Operating income: €38.8 million (2014)
- Net income: €34.1 million (2014)
- Owner: Sumitomo Group (Japan)
- Website: www.fyffes.com

Fyffes plc (/faɪfs/ FYFS) is a Japanese owned UK-based fruit and fresh produce company. The Fyffes brand is most closely associated with the banana industry, although it is applied to a wide range of fruits and fresh produce, including the Fyffes Gold pineapples.

Fyffes is primarily involved in the production, procurement, shipping, ripening, distribution and marketing of bananas, pineapples, and other exotic fresh produce. Fyffes currently markets fruit in Europe and North America, primarily under the Fyffes, Trudi's® and Turbana brands.

== History ==
In 1888, Edward Fyffe, a London food wholesaler, began commercial imports of bananas. Then in 1897 he merged his business with Hudson Brothers, another importer, to form Fyffe Hudson & Co. The business became so successful that they purchased land in the Canaries to be cultivated as banana plantations. Meanwhile, Elder Dempster & Company (a large shipping firm which traded in the Canaries) had observed the success of Fyffe & Hudson and followed suit. In 1898, Elder Dempster's fruit importing business was extended to Jamaica.

To protect the island's economy, the British government agreed to pay a subsidy of £40,000 a year to Elder Dempster to run a regular steamer service to Jamaica and bring large quantities of bananas to the British market. In May 1901, the firms merged and Elders & Fyffes Ltd was established in London. The following year 45% of the capital was purchased by the United Fruit Company of the United States. Thereafter, the business went from strength to strength using specially constructed ships that ensured the fruit arrived in good condition after the long Atlantic crossing.

In 1960, at Bembridge Airport, Isle of Wight, Britten-Norman Ltd began trials of its new Cushioncraft, an air-cushion vehicle built for Elders and Fyffes. It was used to study the potential of this type of vehicle for the carriage of bananas from overseas plantations.

In May 1969, the company was renamed Fyffes Group Ltd, recognising the diversity and importance of its subsidiary companies. It became an Irish company following takeover by the Irish group FII plc in 1986. FII plc had been created when Torney Brothers & McCann (the origins of that company were Charles McCann's apple exporting business founded in 1890) merged with United Fruit Importers Limited to form Fruit Importers of Ireland Limited in 1968. The combined company was initially known as FII Fyffes plc, but became simply Fyffes plc in 1989.

In 1990, the limited supply of bananas in Honduras led to disputes with company Chiquita, dubbed the Banana Wars. Chiquita began illegally seizing and destroying Fyffes' shipments, as well as bribing judges to validate detention orders on Fyffes' ships. This culminated in the destruction of $10 million worth of produce. Fyffes manager Ernst Otto Stalinski alleged that Chiquita used a falsified arrest warrant in a kidnapping attempt, and he filed suit several times. In 2001, the EU dismantled their banana import policy that favoured European companies. This ended any ongoing banana disputes.

In 2002, Fyffes took legal action against DCC plc in relation to the sale of its stake in the company, though DCC was eventually cleared of insider trading at that time. The Supreme Court of Ireland ruled in 2007, that DCC and Mr Flavin had inside information on Fyffes when it sold its stake in the fruit and vegetable distributor for €106 million in early 2000. This overturned a High Court decision which had gone in DCC's favour. The settlement of the civil claim in 2008, cost DCC around €42 million.

In August 2004, Fyffes was involved in a rescue 200 miles (320 km) off the west coast of Ireland at Foynes Port in County Limerick. Four sailors who were attempting a transatlantic world rowing record were picked up in the stormy waters after their boat was destroyed by huge waves. The Fyffes banana ship that rescued them had been en route from Costa Rica with 250,000 cartons of bananas and was completing the 12-day voyage when its crew was alerted to the men's plight.

On 15 May 2006, the company spun off its property portfolio to a separate company, Blackrock International Land plc, though it would retain a 40% share. In September 2006, Irish newspapers reported that it was considering spinning off its fresh produce business, leaving Fyffes as purely a banana importer. On 2 January 2007, this occurred, with Total Produce plc listing on the ISE's Irish Enterprise Exchange and the LSE's Alternative Investment Market.

In September 2008, UNICEF Ireland and Fyffes announced a corporate philanthropy partnership. The five-year partnership funded UNICEF's work in Mozambique combating the spread of malaria amongst orphaned and other vulnerable children.

In March 2014, Fyffes agreed to merge with Chiquita, to form what would have become the world's largest banana distributor. However, in October that year, Fyffes exercised its right to terminate the transaction agreement with Chiquita.

In October 2015, Fyffes abruptly terminated a purchase contract with the Mayan King farms in Belize. Mayan King had been responsible for around one quarter of Belize's banana exports and employed approximately 1,200 people. Workers at the farm protested in fear of losing their jobs. Fyffes stopped buying bananas from the farm in response to the farms' alleged continued affiliation with John Zabaneh, whom the US treasury department had named in 2012 as having ties to Mexican drug baron Joaquín Guzmán ("El Chapo"), leader of the Sinaloa Cartel. Zabaneh had strenuously denied any such ties, but under the Foreign Narcotics Kingpin Designation Act, US citizens and organizations had been effectively banned from doing business with him and any organizations linked to him. Fyffes had severed links with Zabaneh and his interests in 2012 when the treasury department named him as a narcotics trafficker, but had restored ties with Mayan King as a supplier after the banana growers' association assured it that Zabaneh was no longer involved in it and that a company unconnected with him, Meridian Farms, had taken control of Mayan King.

In April 2016, Fyffes acquired Canadian mushroom growers Highline Produce Limited for C$145m (€98m). This was followed by the acquisition of a second Canadian mushroom business, All Seasons Mushrooms Inc. for C$59.1m (€41m).

Fyffes was acquired by the Japanese sogo shosha Sumitomo in February 2017 for €751 million, which took the company private, delisting from the Dublin and AIM stock exchanges.

Fyffes sold its mushroom business to Summit Fresh Produce in 2020.

== Operations ==
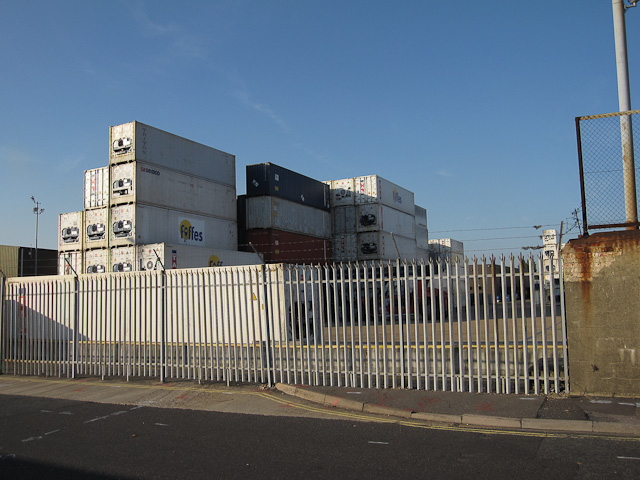
Stacks of Fyffes shipping containers

Fyffes is an old fruit brand dating back to 1929, when the blue label was used on bananas for the first time.

The Fyffes Group ripening facility in Basingstoke is the largest in Europe and is able to accommodate 117,000 boxes (or over 2,100 tonnes) of bananas at any one time. The company formerly operated its own fleet of ships, known as Fyffes Line.

== See also ==
- List of Irish companies

== Bibliography ==
- Beaver, Patrick (1976). Yes! We have some: The story of Fyffes. Publications for Companies. ISBN 978-0-904928-02-0.
- Davies, Peter (1990). Fyffes and the Banana: Musa Sapientum - A Centenary History, 1888-1988, Continuum International Publishing Group. ISBN 978-0485113822
