= Corporación Bananera Nacional =

Costa Rican non-governmental organization

National Banana Corporation
- Corporación Bananera Nacional
- Abbreviation: CORBANA
- Established: 1971; 55 years ago
- Type: Trade association
- Headquarters: San José, Costa Rica
- Region served: Costa Rica
- Products: Bananas
- Methods: Marketing board
- Field: Agricultural marketing
- Website: www.corbana.co.cr

Corporación Bananera Nacional (CORBANA) is a non-governmental institution in Costa Rica supporting the national banana industry.

CORBANA was established in 1971 to develop the banana industry and to serve banana producers.

CORBANA provides technical assistance to the Government of Costa Rica, promotes scientific research to improve banana farming, operates a fund to provide capital to producers, and compiles national and international banana production and consumption figures for the industry and government.

CORBANA is funded by the government and by banana producers.

Based on the study, in 2010 “Banano de Costa Rica” became the first geographical indication to be registered (#20230) in the country via the Registro Nacional – the country's Intellectual Property office. The following year, “Banano de Costa Rica”– Bananas of Costa Rica – was registered via the Lisbon System for the International Registration of Appellations of Origin. The registration defines a specific geographical area of banana production – “the entire territory of the Republic of Costa Rica”. Farmers from that region who also adhere to CORBANA's strict Code of Conduct for producers have been permitted to use the “Banano de Costa Rica” label on their products.
