= Cutrale =

Brazilian company

Sucocitrico Cutrale
- Company type: Private
- Industry: Agriculture; Beverages
- Founded: 1967
- Founder: José Cutrale Jr.
- Headquarters: Araraquara, São Paulo, Brazil
- Products: oranges, orange juice
- Website: www.cutrale.com.br

Sucocitrico Cutrale is a Brazilian company that produces oranges, orange juice, and orange by-products. It is based in Araraquara, São Paulo. The company was founded in 1967 by José Cutrale Jr. and is controlled by the Cutrale family.

Cutrale is one of the world's largest exporters of orange juice. It is responsible for about one quarter of the world orange juice market and also operates in the cultivation and distribution of oranges and orange by-products.

In August 2014, together with Safra Group, it tried to acquire the American banana company Chiquita for US$611 million in cash. At the time Chiquita did not accept the Brazilian offer because it wanted to continue the merger process with Irish Fyffes. However, on October 24, 2014, Chiquita gave up the merger with Fyffes, and on October 27, Safra Group and Cutrale agreed to acquire Chiquita for US$682 million.

The company has orchards and factories in Brazil and the United States.
