= Andrew Preston (businessman) =

American businessman (1846–1924)

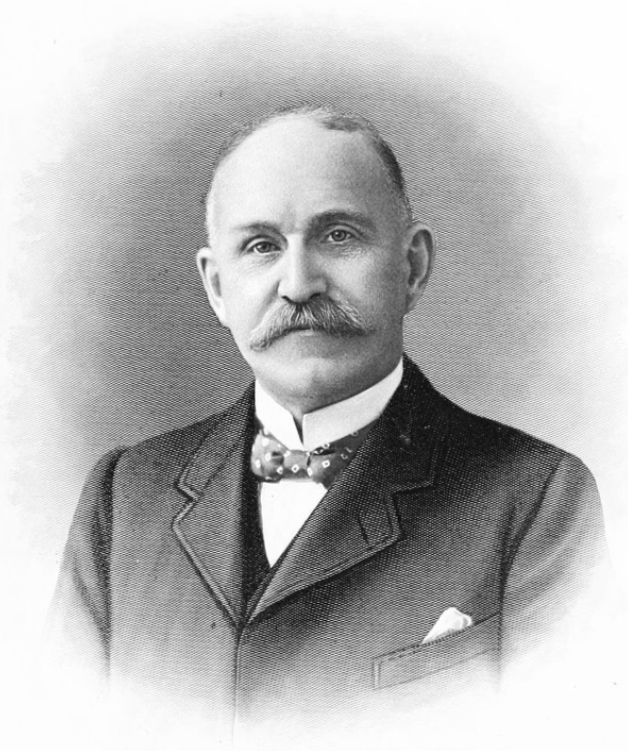
- Born: June 29, 1846; Beverly Farms, Massachusetts
- Died: September 26, 1924 (aged 78); Swampscott, Massachusetts
- Occupation: Businessman
- Known for: Formed the Boston Fruit Company
- Spouse: Frances E. Gutterson (m. 1869)

Signature
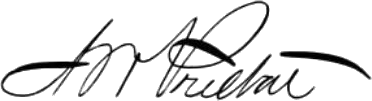

Andrew Woodbury Preston (June 29, 1846 – September 26, 1924) was a prominent American businessman at the turn of the 20th century.

== Biography ==
Andrew Preston was born in Beverly Farms, Massachusetts on June 29, 1846.

He married Frances E. Gutterson on August 5, 1869, and they had one daughter.

In 1884, Preston and nine others formed the Boston Fruit Company, an event marking the birth of the modern banana business. Later, in 1899, Preston and Minor C. Keith combined ventures to form the United Fruit Company. Preston was the president, and Keith became vice-president.

He died at his summer home in Swampscott, Massachusetts, on September 26, 1924. At the time of his death he was still serving as president of the United Fruit Company, the Revere Sugar Refining company, the Central American railroad companies, the Tropical Radio company the Banana Specialty company, and was an officer of several other organizations.
