= The Dead One =

The Dead One may refer to:

- The Dead Ones, a 1948 film created by director Gregory Markopoulos
- The Dead One (1961 film), a 1961 independent film
- The Dead One (2007 film), a 2007 film by Brian Cox
- "The Dead One", a song by Insane Clown Posse from their album Ringmaster
- Cerro El Muerto or The Dead One Hill, a mountain peak in the Andes

== See also ==
- El Muerto (disambiguation)
- Personifications of death
