= Pan de muerto =

Mexican pastry

Pan de Muerto
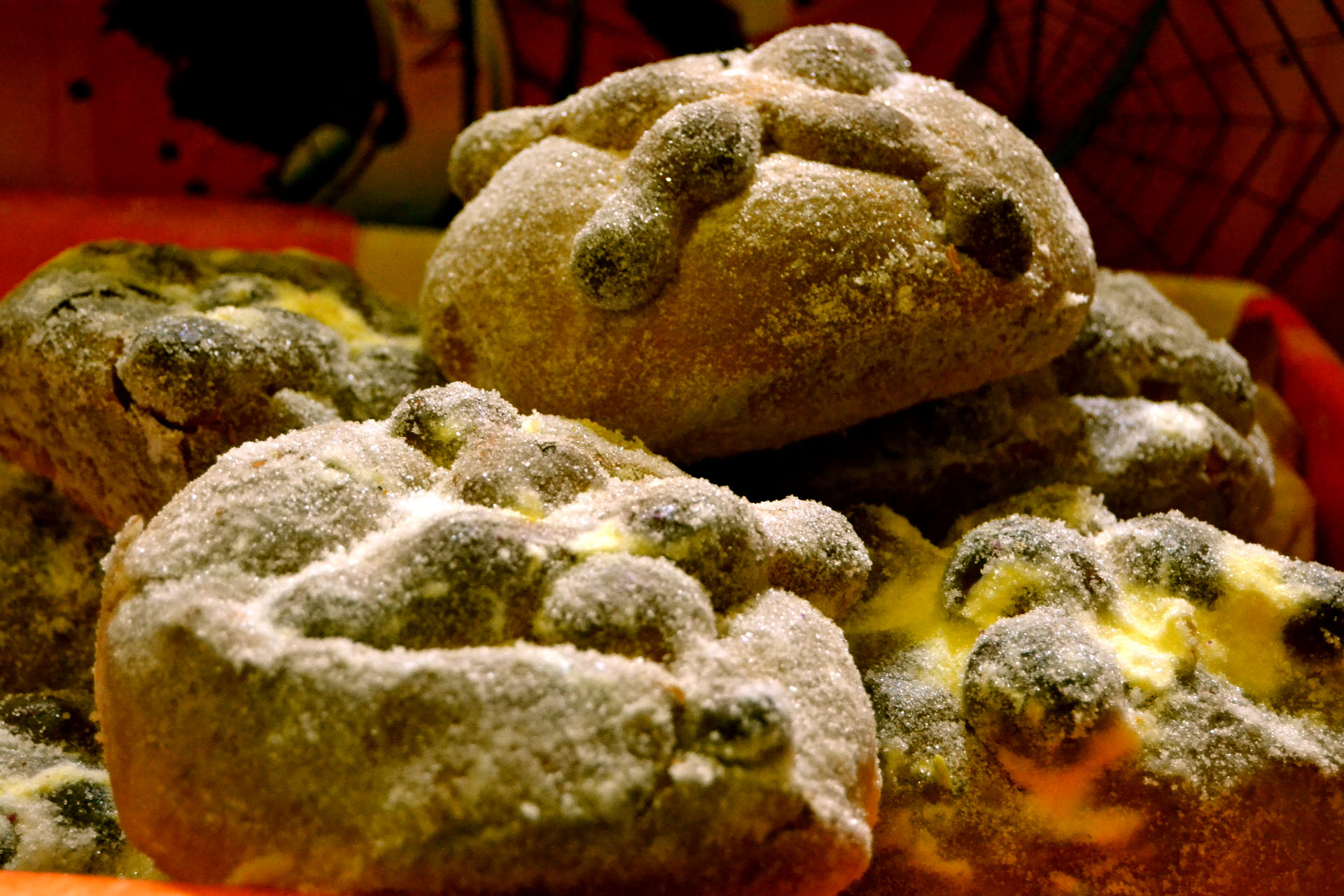
- Alternative names: Bread of the dead
- Type: Sweet bread
- Place of origin: Mexico

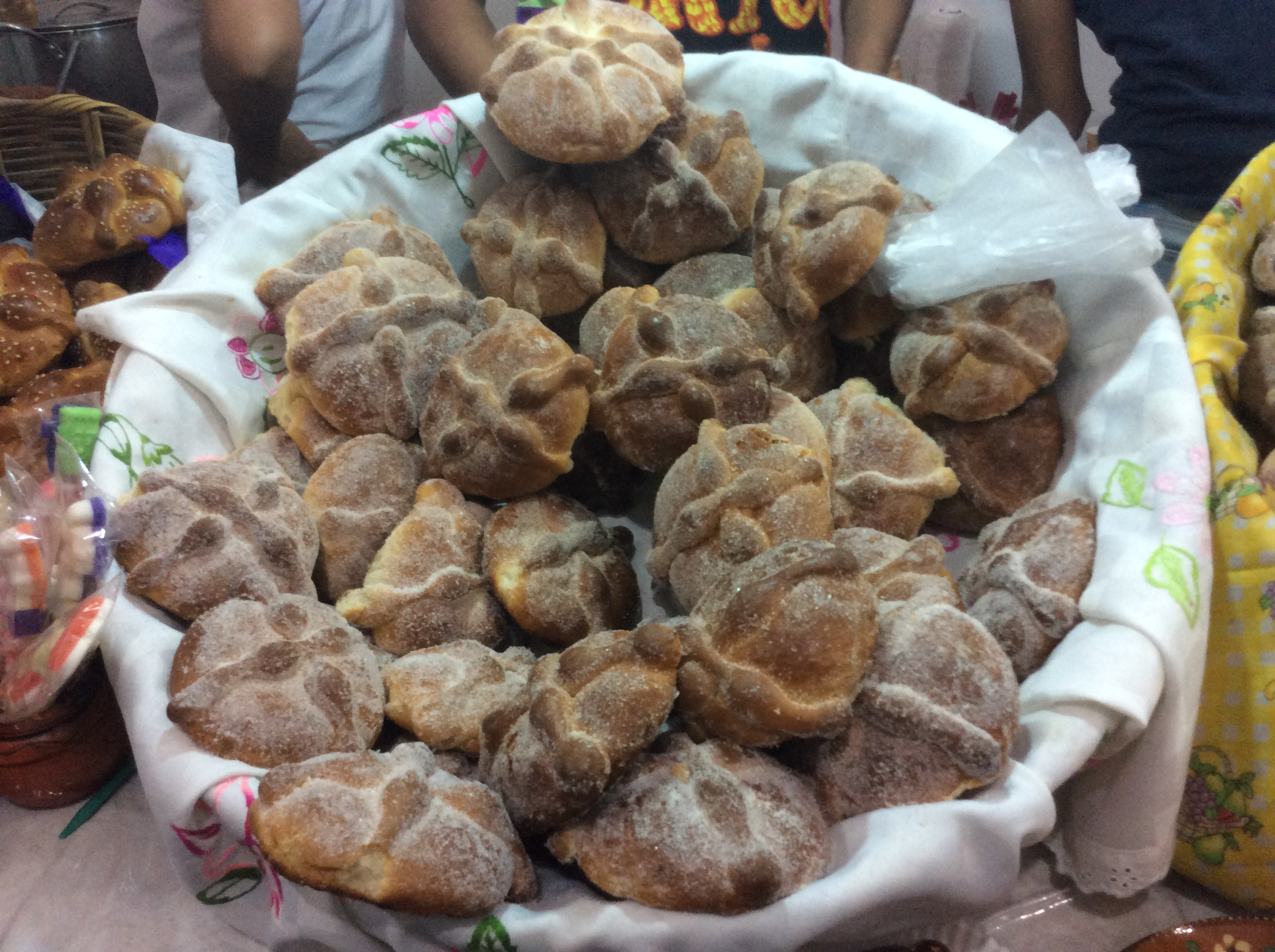
A basket of pan de muerto

Pan de muerto (Spanish for 'bread of the dead') is a type of pan dulce traditionally baked in Mexico and the Mexican diaspora during the weeks leading up to the Día de Muertos, which is celebrated from November 1 to November 2.

== Description ==
It is a sweetened soft bread shaped like a bun, often decorated with bone-shaped phalanx pieces. Some traditions state that the rounded or domed top of the bread represents a grave. Bread of the dead usually has skulls or crossbones added in extra dough. The bones represent the deceased one (difuntos or difuntas), or perhaps bones coming out of a grave, there is normally a baked tear drop on the bread to represent goddess Chīmalmā's tears for the living. The bones are often represented in a circle to portray the circle of life. The bread is topped with sugar, sometimes white and sometimes dyed pink. This bread can be found in Mexican grocery stores in the U.S.

The classic recipe for pan de muerto is a simple sweet bread recipe, often with the addition of anise seeds, and other times flavored with orange flower water, which added to dough or syrup for greasing, or orange zest. The bread often contains some fat, such as butter. Its texture has been described as similar to that of challah, brioche, or falling between a concha and a hamburger bun.

Other variations are made depending on the region or the baker. The one baking the bread will usually wear decorated wristbands, a tradition which was originally practiced to protect from burns on the stove or oven.

Pan de muerto is eaten on Día de Muertos, at the gravesite or alternatively, at a domestic altar called an ofrenda. In some regions, it is eaten for months before the official celebration of Dia de Muertos. As part of the celebration, loved ones eat pan de muerto as well as the relative's favorite foods, but not those that have been placed on the ofrenda. It is believed the spirits do not eat, but absorb its essence, along with water at their ofrenda, after their long journey back to Earth.

== History ==
=== Origin ===
The Day of the Dead is an example of Spanish-indigenous cultural mixing. Wheat and the baking culture were introduced to America by the Spanish, so it is not uncommon to see that many classic Mexican breads, such as cemita, pan bazo or telera, have their respective counterparts in Spain. For its part, the pan de muerto has its origin in the pan de ánimas ('soul bread'), a votive product (an offering) that was formerly prepared for All Saints and Faithful Departed (November 1 and 2) in areas of Castile, Portugal, Aragon and Sicily (among other places) to honor to deceased loved ones. The parishioners came annually to the cemetery and put bread, wine and flowers on the graves. The bread was blessed by the local priest, so it was also known as pan bendecido ("blessed bread"). During the Viceroyalty of New Spain, the pan de ánimas was used by the Spanish as an offering for their dead, and was assimilated by the indigenous people because of their pre-Hispanic beliefs. At first, the breads produced in Mexico were crude and poorly developed doughs, but over time, the country strengthened its baking tradition by making increasingly refined pieces. In certain Mexican states, such as Puebla or Tlaxcala (both with noticeable Spanish influence), pan de muertos is still occasionally called pan de ánimas.

=== Folk history ===
A frequently repeated myth explains that the Mexican bread of the dead dates back to the pre-Hispanic custom of human sacrifice: "A maiden was offered to the gods, and they placed her still beating heart in a pot with amaranth, they had to bite it as a symbol of gratitude". Legend has it that the conquistadors, disgusted with the cannibalistic practice, forced the natives to replace the heart with a nice sweet bun. Although this origin is not true, it serves to interpret the "ritual" meaning of the dead bread, since it is an allegory of the deceased person: the circular shape symbolizes the cycle of life and death; the ball of dough in the center is the skull, as well as the decoration that represents the bones, symbolically arranged in the shape of a cross. Thus, the bread comes to embody the dead person himself. In the words of José Luis Curiel Monteagudo: "Eating the dead is a true pleasure for the Mexican, it is considered the anthropophagy of bread and sugar. The phenomenon is assimilated with respect and irony, death is challenged, they make fun of it by eating it."

Various Mexican public institutions omit the Hispano-Christian origin of pan de muerto, attributing it to pre-Hispanic preparations. For example, the National Institute of Indigenous Peoples relates the bread of the dead with the papalotlaxcalli. According to the chronicles of Fray Bernardino de Sahagún, the papalotlaxcalli was literally a butterfly (papalotl)-shaped tortilla (tlaxcalli) that was offered to women who died in childbirth or Cihuapipiltin. Likewise, the blog of the Cuautitlán Izcalli University points out another possible ancestor of the pan de muerto, the huitlatamalli, a votive tamale. The papalotlaxcalli as remote origin of the bread of the dead is a thesis defended by the Government of Mexico on its website, and it is the most widespread theory today. The Spanish pan de ánimas is not mentioned at any time in the theories disclosed by these three entities. However, the very composition of the ingredients of the pan de muerto reveals its origin: wheat, cane sugar, cow's milk and butter, eggs and orange aroma. All these products arrived in America in what is known as the "Columbian exchange". According to Dr. Malvido (1999), although much weight has been given to pre-Hispanic ideas in the celebration of the Day of the Dead, the influence that the Spanish culture and Catholic religion has exerted in colonial Mexico is also very important. According to this author, in an essay published by the National Institute of Anthropology and History: "continuing to think that [the pan de muerto] is a tradition of pre-Hispanic origin means that we did not understand anything, since it is profoundly Roman". With the industrialization of Europe, the traditions of panes de ánimas ('soul breads') disappeared from the Old Continent, but curiously the tradition is still alive on the other side of the ocean, in Mexico, as well as in the Central Andes, where the bread of the dead is known as guagua or tanwawa.

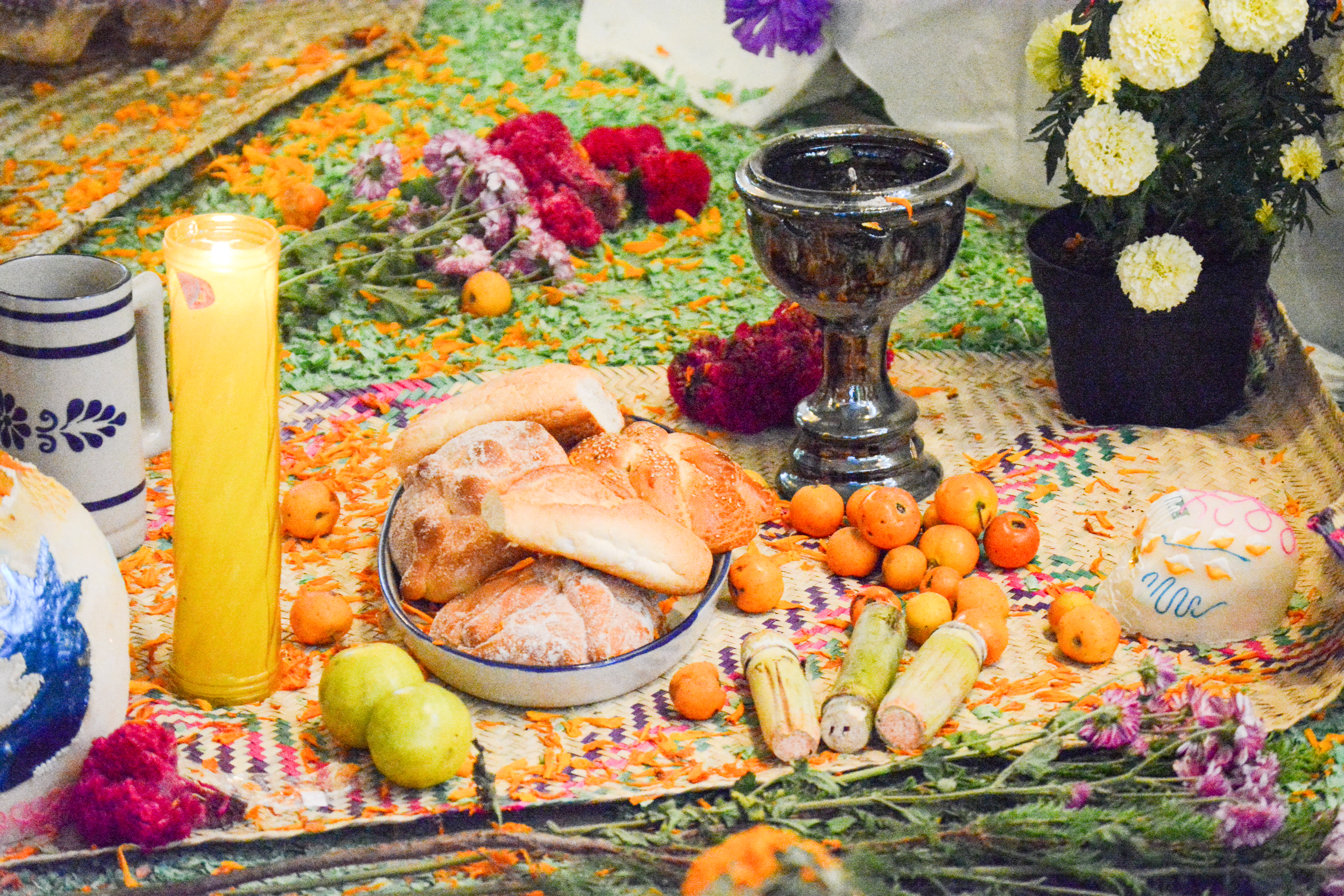
Pan de muertos and other offerings on an altar de muertos

In this regard, Stanley Brandes, historian and anthropologist of Mexican culture (and in particular of the Day of the Dead), comments:

To the question of European vs indigenous origins, there can be no simple resolution until more extensive colonial sources come to light. For now, evidence indicates that the Mexican Day of the Dead is a colonial invention, a unique product of colonial demographic and economic processes. The principal types and uses of food on this holiday definitely derive from Europe. After all, there is no tortilla de muertos but rather pan de muertos, just one highly significant detail. Nor did cane sugar exist in the Americas prior to the Spanish conquest. The existence of special breads and sugar based sweets, the custom of placing these and other food substances on gravesites and altars, and the practice of begging and other distributive mechanisms all derive from Spain. At the same time, the particular anthropomorphic form that Day of the Dead sweets assume is part of both Spanish and Aztec traditions. This combination of Spanish and indigenous culinary habits and tastes no doubt culminated in the ofrenda patterns we observe today. The ofrenda itself is probably Spanish, although it has long assumed significance in Mexico that far outstrips that in the mother country.

— Skulls to the Living, Bread to the Dead (2009), pg. 40., by Stanley Brandes

=== 20th and 21st centuries ===
Until the 1970s and 1980s in the United States, pan de muerto was not common in celebrations of what was then largely called All Saints' Day, but the rise of Chicano cultural activism lead to an embrace of the bread, public altars, and the name Dia de los Muertos. In Latin communities in Los Angeles, for example, many public altars serve as protests, such as those dedicated to the victims of police brutality.

With the rise of globalized cultural awareness starting in the 1990s, pan de muerto has become a cultural ambassador for Mexican popular culture. A 2019 Japanese exhibition at the National Museum of Ethnology on Mexican folk art, for example, included a baking demonstration and samples of the bread for visitors. As a form of cultural outreach and collaboration with local communities, some American museums and institutions create public altars that include pan de muerto.

== Regional variations ==
In San Andrés Mixquic, despeinadas (literally, unkempt or unbrushed ones) are made with sprinkles and sesame seeds.

Muertes (deaths), made in the State of Mexico, are made with a mix of sweet and plain dough with a small amount of cinnamon. Other types in the region include gorditas de maíz, aparejos de huevo (egg sinkers, apparently after fishing weights) and huesos (bones).

In Michoacán, breads include pan de ofrenda (offering bread), the shiny pan de hule (rubber bread), and corn-based corundas, made with tomato sauce and chile de árbol.

In Puebla, and in diaspora communities, the bread often is coated with bright pink sugar. Within Puebla, there are further regional specializations, with towns such as San Sebastián Zinacatepec known for baking pan de muerto.

== In popular culture ==
While the bread has always been an expression of popular religious celebrations, by the late 2010s, pan de muerto had become more known through several American pop culture representations. It appeared in the 2017 Pixar film Coco, which broadened recognition of the bread outside the Mexican diaspora. In the award-winning young adult novel Cemetery Boys by Latino-American author Aiden Thomas (2020), pan de muerto is a central component in a Dia de los Muertos celebration.

== See also ==
- Dead-cakes

- Sin-eater

- Pan dulce
- List of buns

== Bibliography ==
- Malvido, Elsa (1999). "Ritos funerarios en el México colonial". Arqueología Mexicana. 40 (7): 46–51.
