= Muerte =

Muerte, Spanish for death, may refer to:

== Music ==
- Muerte (album), by Will Haven, 2018
- La Muerte (album), by Gorefest, 2005
- Muerte, an album by Canserbero, 2012
- "La Muerte", a song by Luísa Sonza and Tokischa, 2023

== People ==
- Arturo Beltrán Leyva (1961–2009), "La Muerte", Mexican drug trafficker
- Leon del Muerte (born 1977), American guitarist and vocalist

== Religion ==
- Santa Muerte, Mesoamerican religious figure
- San La Muerte, South American religious figure

== See also ==
- Muerto (disambiguation)
- Viva la Muerte (disambiguation)
