= Cochinito de piloncillo =

Traditional Mexican pig-shaped pastry

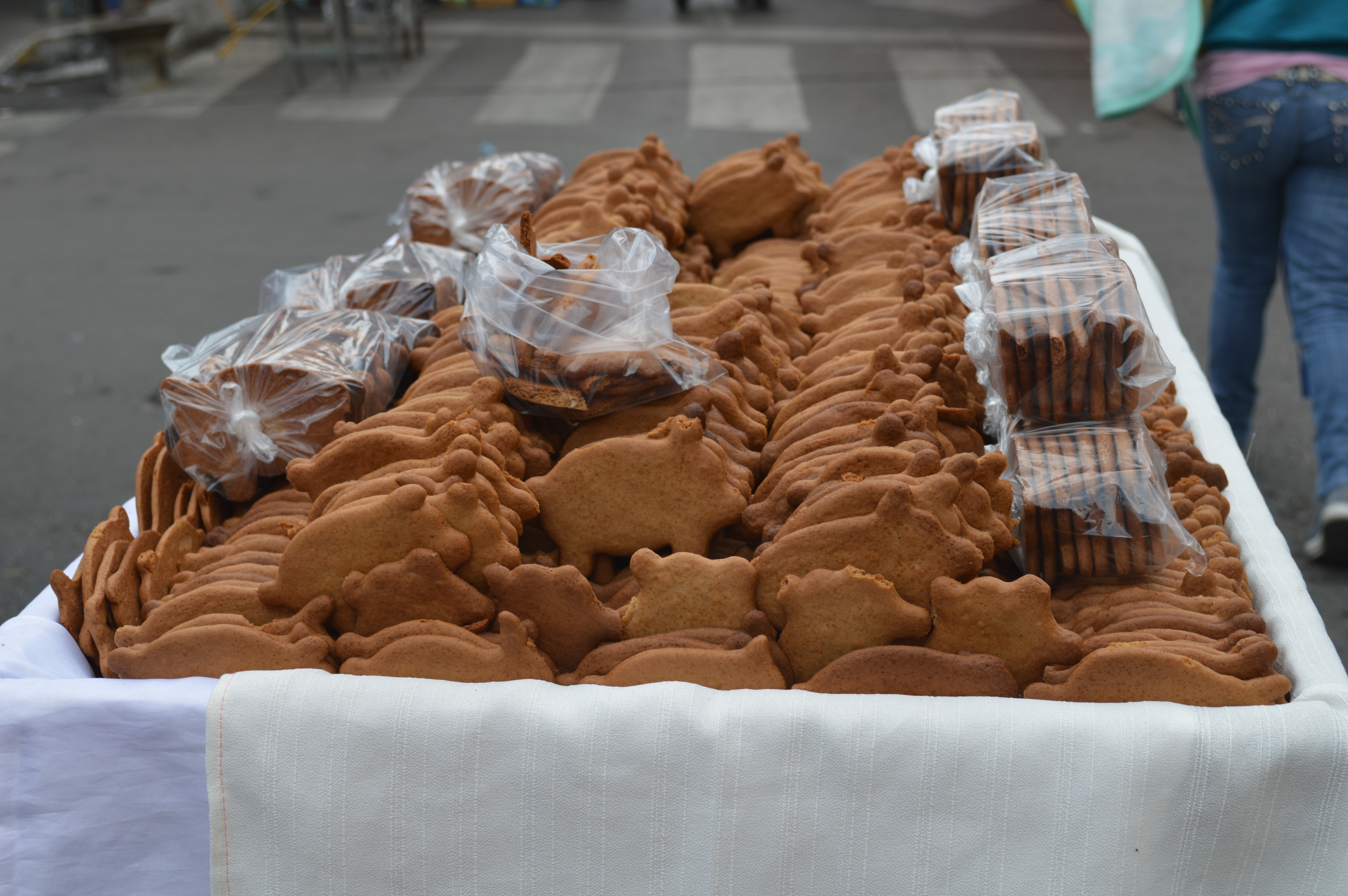
- Cochinitos sold by a street vendor at a fair in Cuajimalpa, Mexico City
- Alternative names: Marranitos, cochinitos and puerquitos
- Type: Bread
- Place of origin: Mexico
- Associated cuisine: Mexican breads, pan dulce

Cochinitos de piloncillo, also known as marranitos, cochinitos and puerquitos (all meaning "little pigs" in Spanish), are a typical Mexican sweet bread (pan dulce) made with "piloncillo"—a type of sweetener made from sugar cane, and baked in a shape resembling a pig. Cochinitos are popular in bakeries in Mexico and throughout the US.

Cochinitos de piloncillo are an oven-cooked pastry which forms a part of the Huastecan gastronomy in the northern section of the Gulf of Mexico in Mexico. The type of bread these treats are made from is chichimbré, the name chichimbré is a deformation of gingerbread. Gingerbread was brought by the English to Mexico during and after the First World War for the extraction of oil in Mexico, today ginger is no longer added, but instead other spices such as cinnamon and anise
