= Muerto =

Muerto or Muerta (Spanish for "dead person") may refer to:

- Muerto, California, alternate name of Leliter, California
- La Muerta, Mayan archaeological site
- Isla Muerta (disambiguation) or Isla de Muerta, various fictional locations

== See also ==
- Muerte (disambiguation)
- El Muerto (disambiguation)
