= Viva la Muerte =

Viva la Muerte (English: either "Long Live Death" or "Live the Death") may refer to:

- Viva la Muerte (film), by Fernando Arrabal
- Viva la Muerte (album), a 1994 album by Cobra Verde
- Viva la Muerte, a 2008 album by Inkubus Sukkubus

== See also ==
- Long Live Death (disambiguation)
- Miguel de Unamuno § Confrontation with Millán Astray
- José Millán-Astray § Confrontation with Unamuno
