= Cemita =

Sandwich from Puebla City, in México

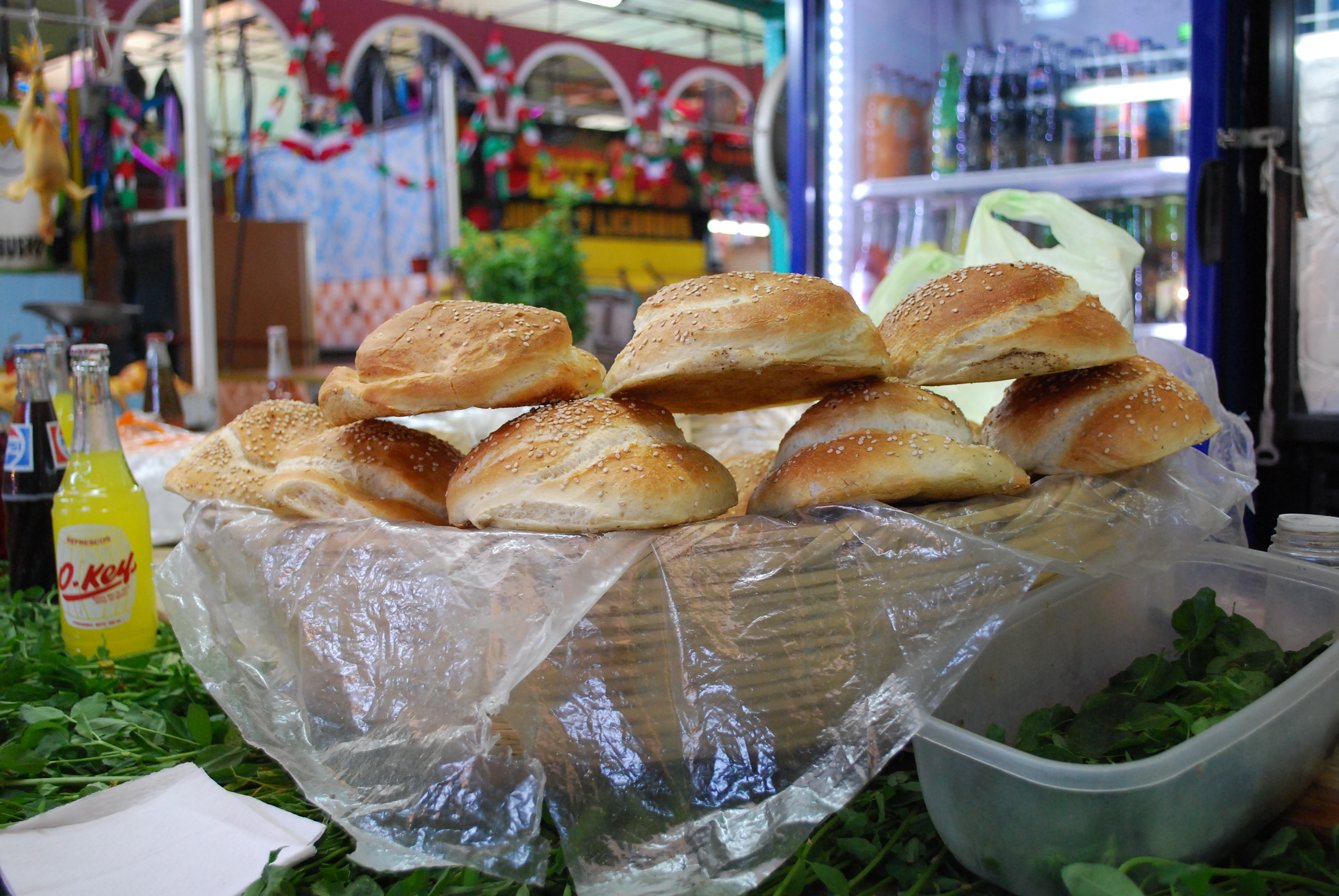
- Cemita rolls at a market in Puebla, Mexico
- Alternative names: Cemita poblana
- Type: Bread roll or sandwich
- Place of origin: Mexico
- Region or state: Puebla

The cemita is a sandwich originally from Puebla, Mexico. Also known as cemita poblana, it derives from the city (and region) of Puebla. The word refers to the sandwich as well as to the roll it is typically served on, a bread roll covered with sesame seeds. Additionally, the ingredients usually are restricted to sliced avocado, meat, Oaxaca cheese, the herb pápalo and chipotle adobado, or jalapeño.

== Name ==
The Real Academia Española says cemita comes from "acemite" (archaic Spanish for "bran") which in turn comes from Aramaic, and is related to Greek σεμίδαλις (semídalis) ("semolina").

== Reception ==
The Daily Meal reviewed the cemita, saying "there are numerous variations, but it's always a delicious mouthful" in their article "12 Life-Changing Sandwiches You've Never Heard Of".

== See also ==
- Mexican breads
- Mexican cuisine
- List of bread rolls
- List of Mexican dishes
- List of sandwiches
