= El Muerto =

El Muerto is a Spanish term that translates as "The Dead One". It may refer to:

== Comics ==
- El Muerto: The Aztec Zombie, an independent comic book character created by Javier Hernandez
- El Muerto (DC Comics), a DC Comics superhero and crime-fighter stationed in Mexico City
- El Muerto (Marvel Comics), a Marvel Comics character in Spider-Man comics

== Film ==
- El Muerto (2007 film), a 2007 film adaptation of the independent comic book starring Wilmer Valderrama
- El Muerto (unproduced film), an unproduced film based on the Marvel Comics character, developed by Sony

== Other uses ==
- Dia de los Muertos, holiday celebrated in several Latin American countries serving as a remembrance of the Dead
  - Pan de Muerto, type of bread baked during the Dia de los Muertos season
- Caja de Muertos, Puerto Rico, island south of Puerto Rico
- Cerro El Muerto, mountain peak in the Andes on border of Argentina and Chile (21,457 feet high)
- Jornada del Muerto, ("Journey of the Dead Man"), name given by Spanish conquistadors to a desert basin route from New Spain (Mexico) to northern New Mexico
- Los Toreros Muertos, Spanish speaking musical group
- Metro Barranca del Muerto, train station on the Mexico City Metro

== See also ==
- Muerto (disambiguation)
