= Pan dulce =

Generic name for a range of Mexican baked goods

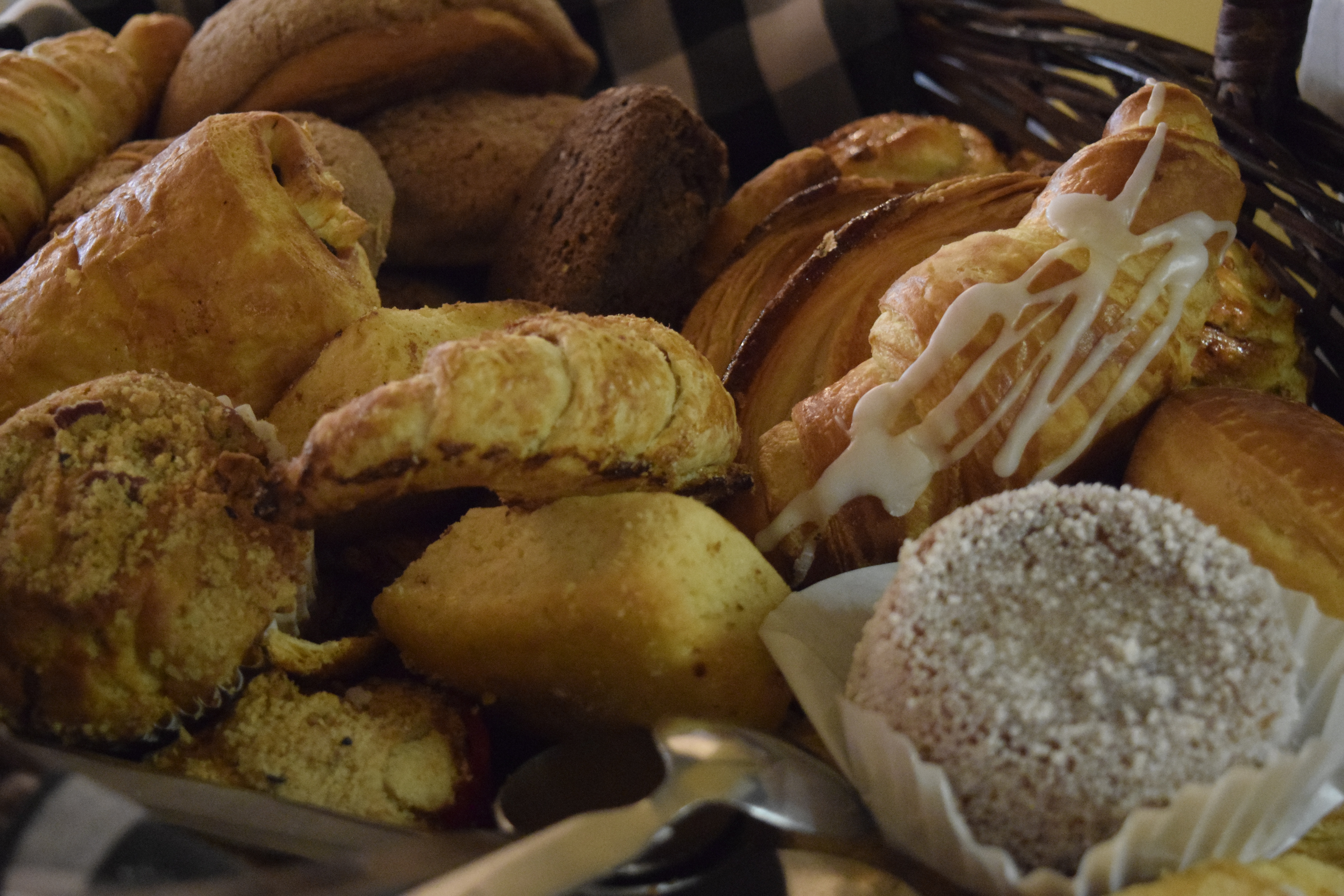
- Pan dulce at a shop in Mexico City
- Type: Sweet bread or pastry
- Place of origin: Mexico

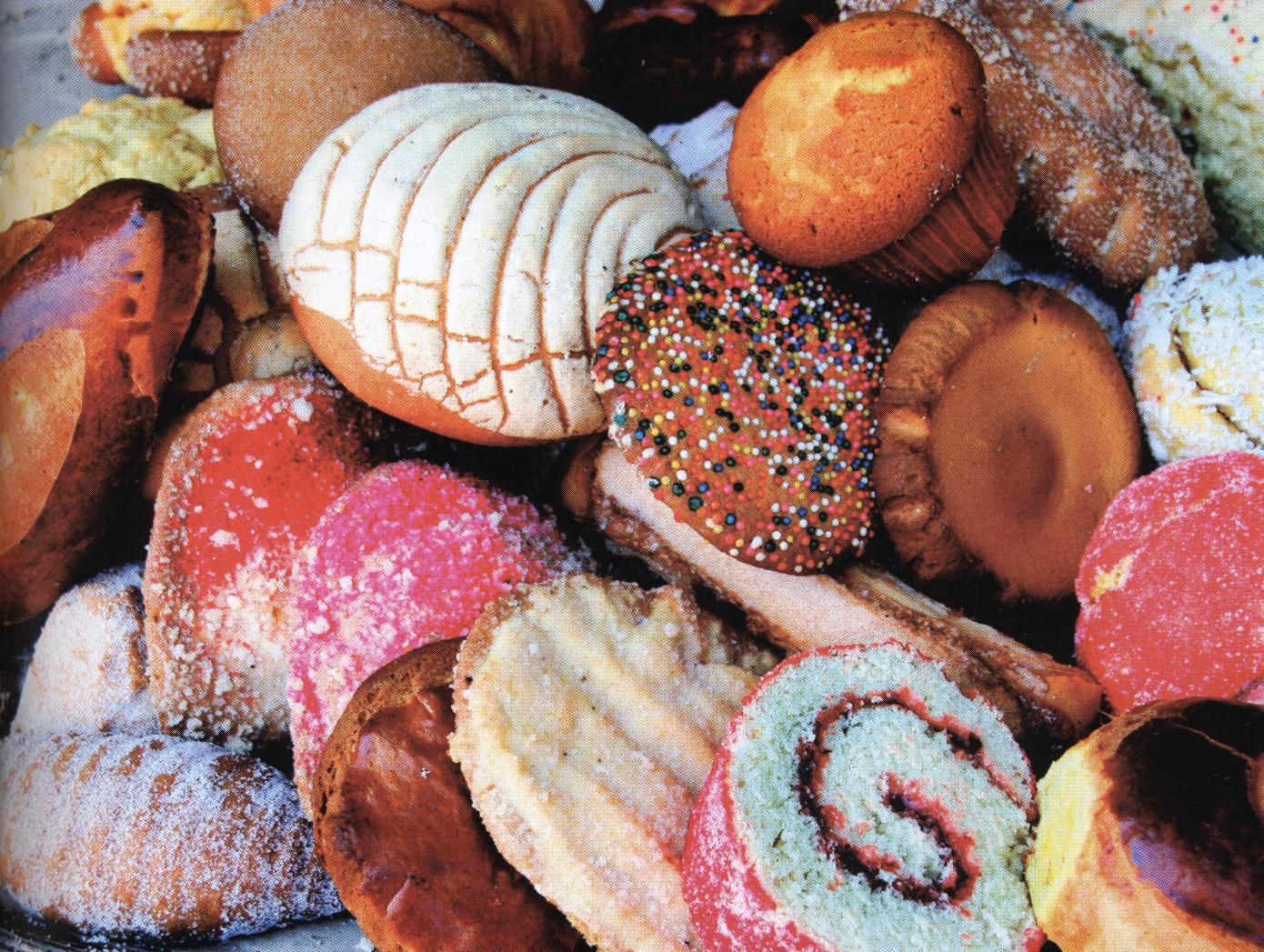
Pan dulce comes in different shapes, colors and sizes.

Pan dulce (Latin American Spanish pronunciation: [ˌpan ˈdulse]; lit. 'sweet bread') is the general name for a variety of Mexican baked goods. They are inexpensive treats and are consumed at breakfast, merienda, or dinner. These baked goods oftentimes are created with intent to derive meaning from people, animals, and objects. The baked goods originated in Mexico following the introduction of wheat during the Spanish conquest of the Americas and developed into many varieties thanks to French influences in the 19th century.

== Types ==
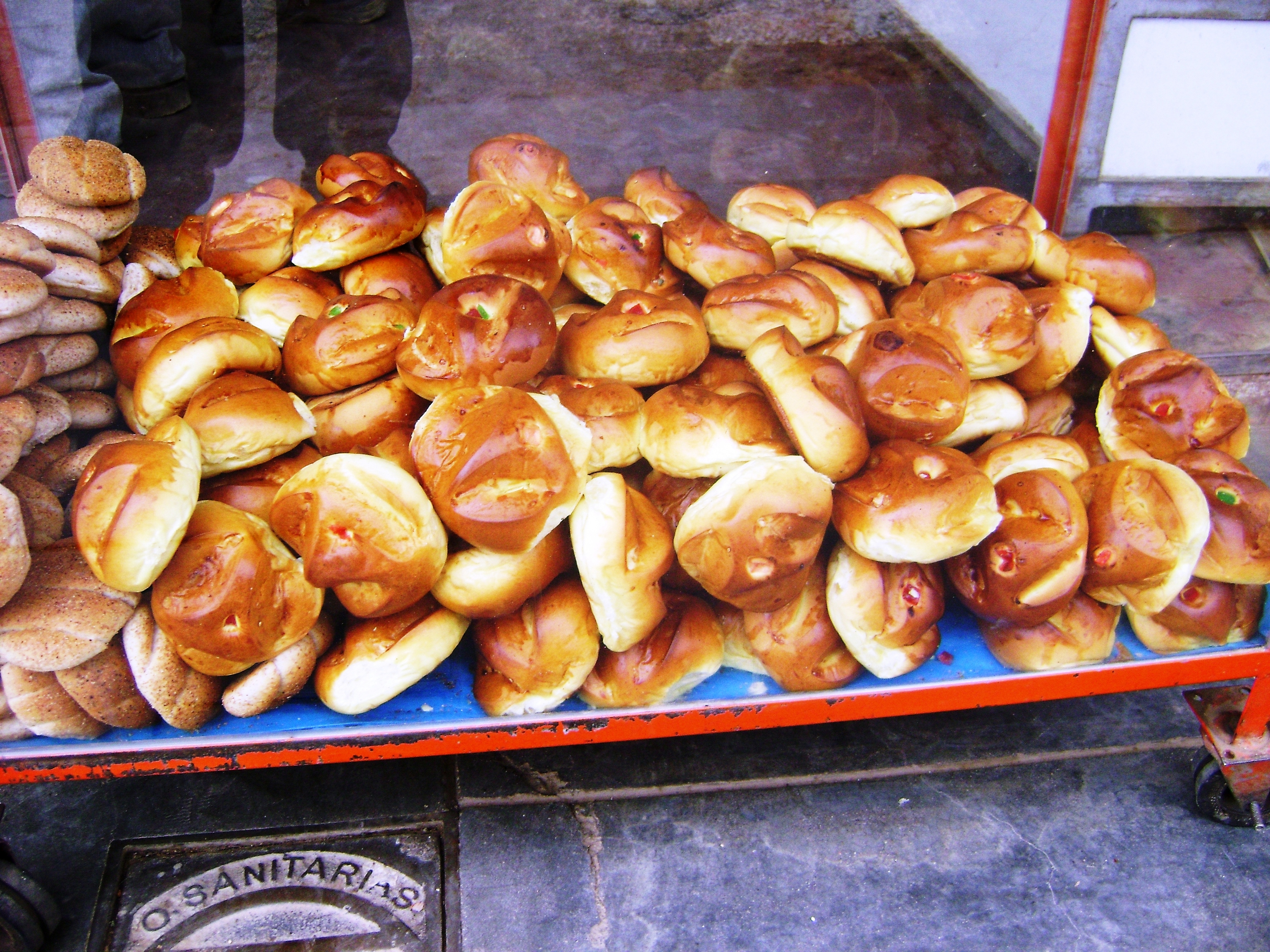
Pan dulce

Bread was first introduced to Mexico in the 16th century by Spaniards. The indigenous people of Mexico accepted this wheat bread even though their bread was considered to be the corn tortilla. Over the years, Mestizo people developed different types of breads. The creative contribution of French baked goods to Mexico's cuisine peaked in the early 20th century during the dictatorship of Porfirio Díaz. Skilled Mexican bakers adopted French techniques to create new bread designs with colorful names. Today it is estimated that there are between 500 and 2,000 types of bread currently produced in Mexico. Among these are:

- Alamar
- Almohada
- Antaño
- Barquillo
- Barra para rebanadas
- Beso
- Bicicletas
- Bigote
- Bísquet
- Bocado
- Budín
- Burrita
- Calabaza
- Calvo
- Calzón
- Canasta
- Caracol
- Cemita
- Chafaldrana
- Chamuco
- Chicharrón
- Chilindrina
- Chimistlán
- Chirimoya
- Chirindolfo
- Cocoles
- Colchón
- Concha
- Congal
- Coyota
- Cuerno de mantequilla
- Cuerno de vapor
- Donas
- Doroteo
- Elote
- Empanochada
- Galletas de coco
- Gendarme
- Guarapo
- Gusano
- Gusarapo
- Hojaldra
- Ladrillo
- Manita
- Mexicano
- Moño de danés
- Mundos
- Neblina
- Nopal
- Novia
- Ojo de Pancha
- Oreja
- Pachucos
- Pan catarino
- Pan de caja
- Pan de elote
- Pan de feria
- Pan de muerto
- Pan de nata
- Pan de pueblo
- Pan de pulque
- Pan de royal
- Pan de yema
- Pan decorado con letras
- Pan en forma de corazón
- Pan en forma de tornillo
- Pan mestizo
- Pan redondo bordado
- Pan redondo o moreliano
- Pan típico de nuez
- Panquecito
- Pechuga
- Piedra
- Polvorón
- Puerquito de piloncillo
- Rebanada
- Regañada
- Reja
- Rehiletes
- Riel
- Rosca de reyes
- Roscas de canela
- Soles
- Tanas
- Tecoyota
- Trenza
- Yolanda
- Yoyos

=== Campechanas ===
Campechanas are rectangular or round glazed Mexican pastries (referred to as hojaldre, Mexican millefeuille). They are crisp, flaky, and have a shiny caramel colored finish. Champechanas are a very common pan dulce.

=== Conchas ("shells") ===
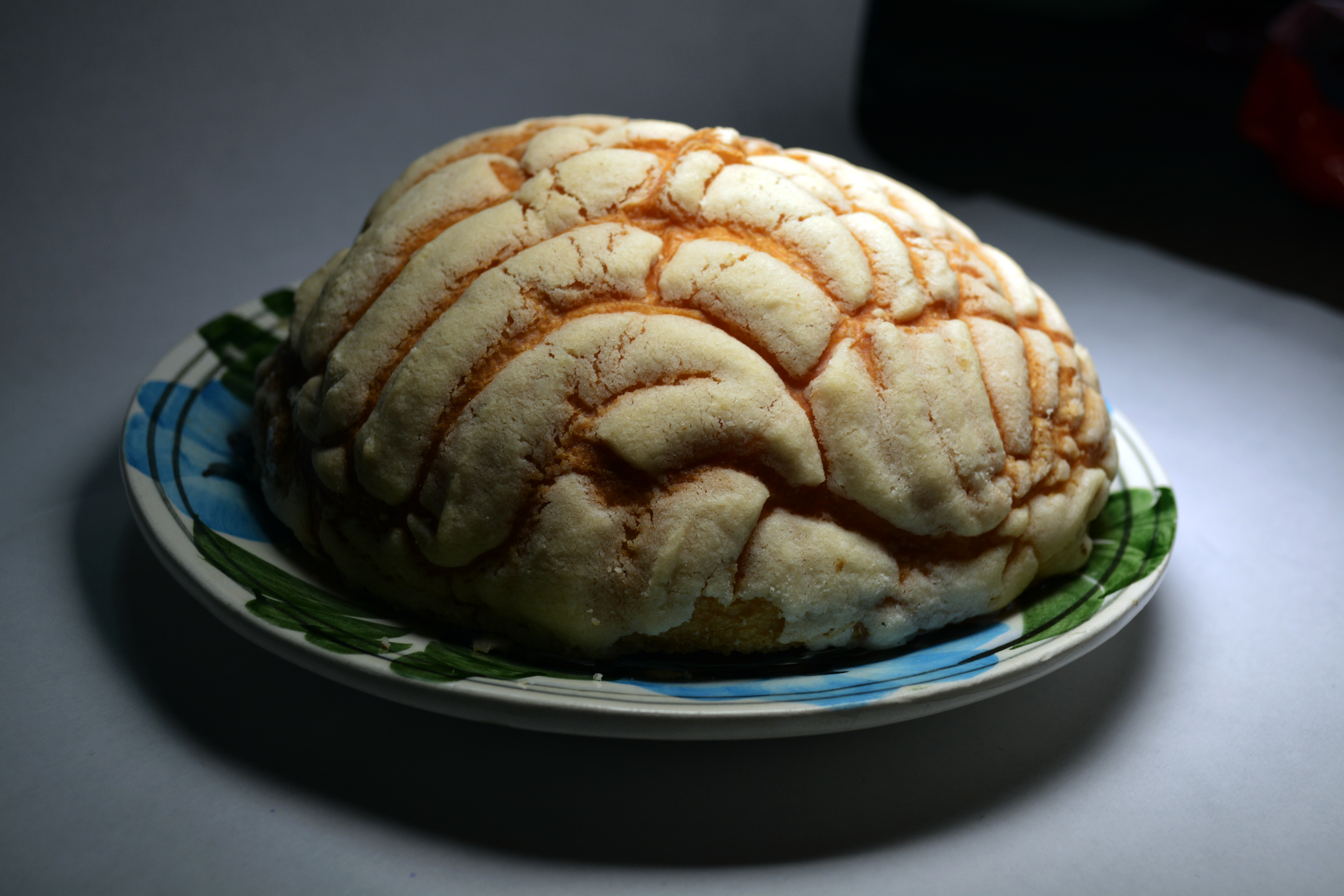
A concha sweet bread bought in Mexico City

Conchas ("shells") are a pan dulce known for their sugary topping, which gives them their shell-like appearance. They are one of the most famous of the pan dulce, being widely recognized in the United States. The topping is usually colored white, brown, pink or yellow, and is usually flavored with vanilla or chocolate.

=== Cuernos ("horns") ===
Cuernos ("horns") are a Mexican pastry that is known for its horn-like shape. This pastry has garnered many comparisons to the French croissant.

=== Empanadas (turnovers) ===
Empanadas are a turnover more commonly served in Cuba and South America but also have a place in Mexican cuisine. They are filled with meat or other ingredients such as cheese or vegetables of different sorts. They are also filled with fruit such as pumpkin or apple.

=== Marranitos / cochinitos / puerquitos ("little pigs") ===
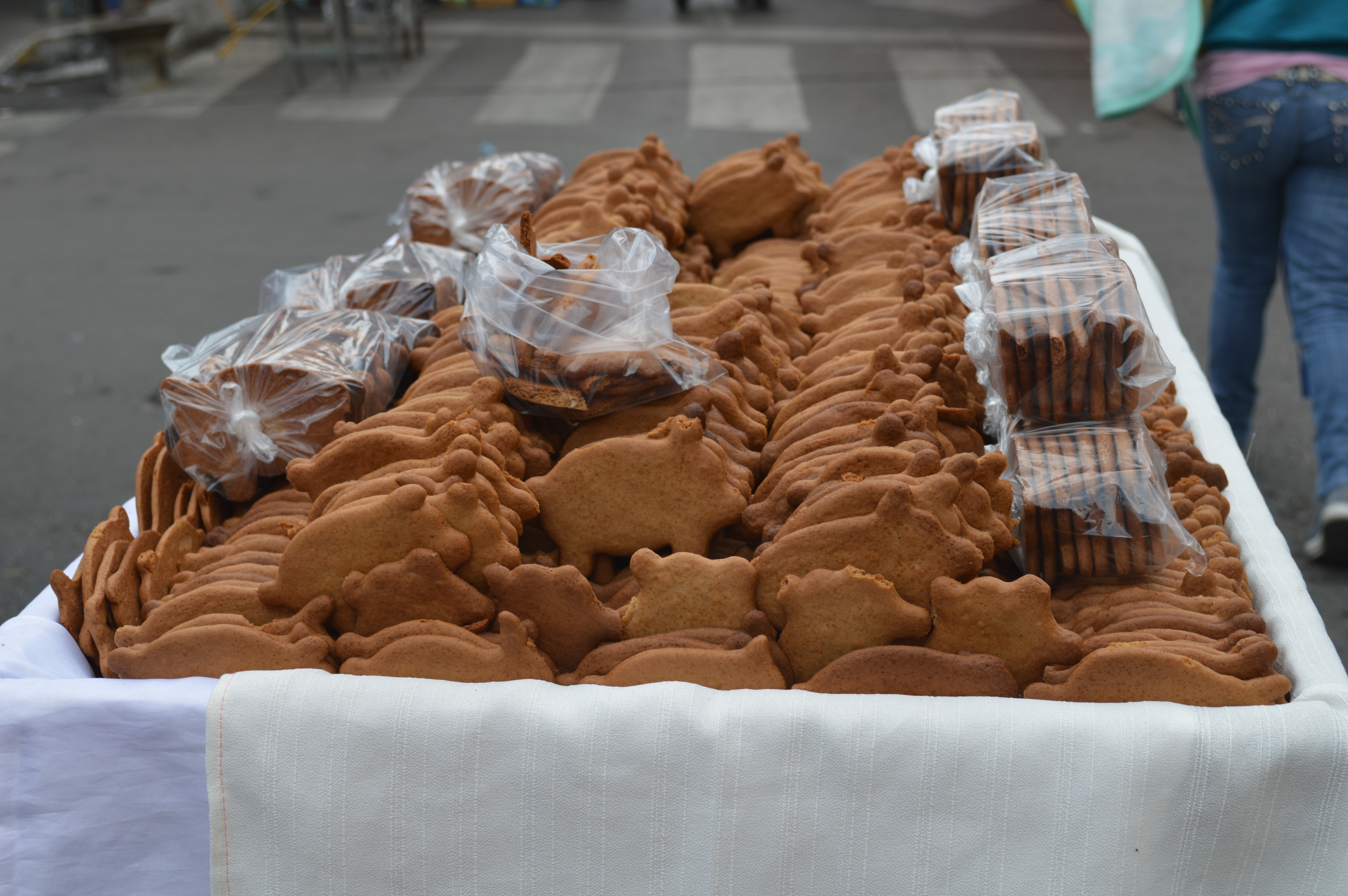
Cochinitos sold by a street vendor at a fair in Cuajimalpa, Mexico City

Marranitos/cochinitos/puerquitos ("little pigs") are pig-shaped pastries sweetened with piloncillo and spiced with cinnamon. The bread has erroneously been called "gingerbread pig" because the finished result looks similar to gingerbread. However, ginger isn't used to make the pastry.

=== Orejas ("ears") ===
Orejas ("ears") are flaky and sweet Mexican pastries that are shaped like an ear and are very common at bakeries. They are very similar to a French Palmier.

=== Piedras ("rocks" or "stones") ===
Piedras ("rocks" or "stones") is a pastry made of old bread and is known to be as hard as a rock. Many people eat this with very hot drinks.

=== Polvorones (wedding cookies) ===
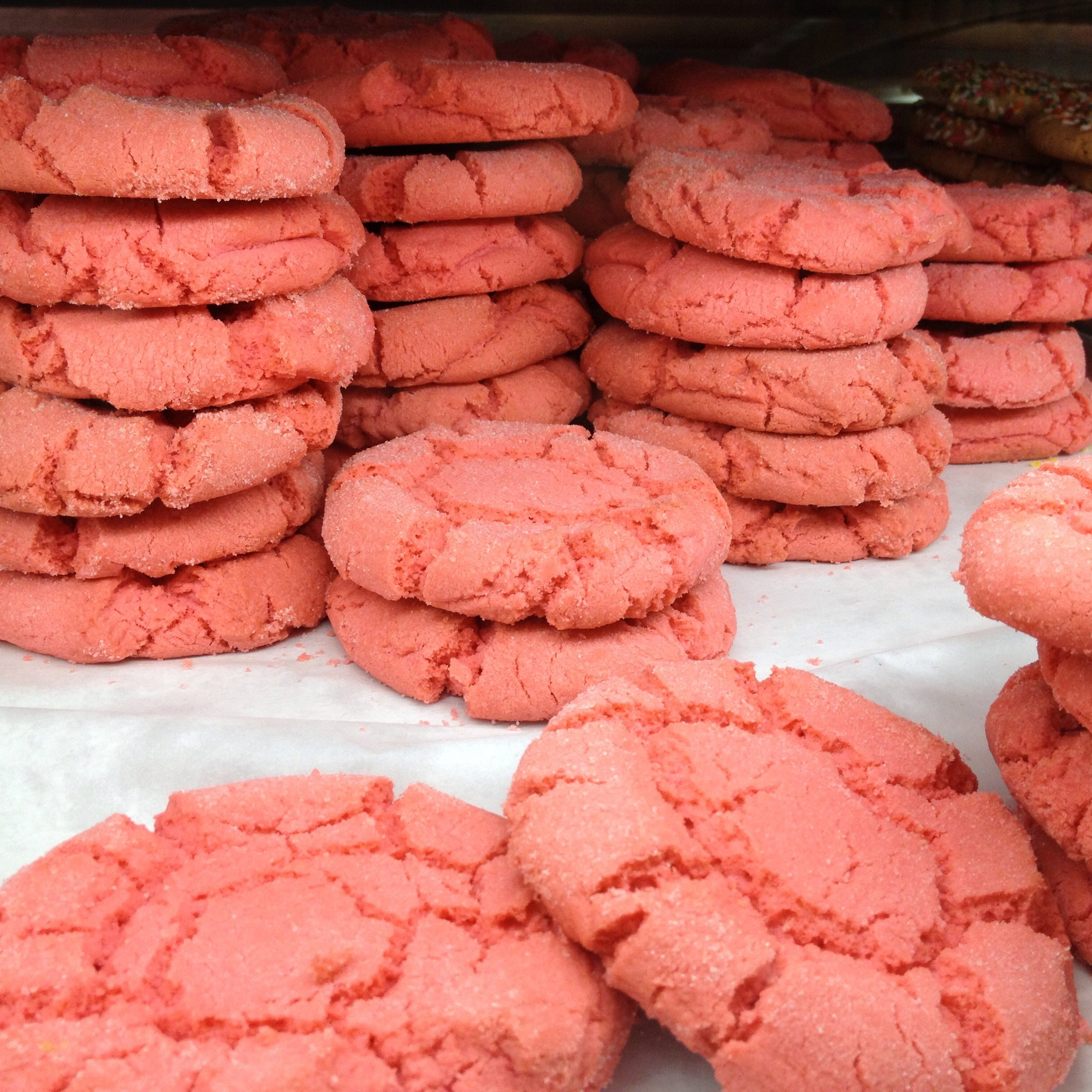
Polvorones Rosas

Polvorones (wedding cookies) are shortbread cookies, often eaten at weddings. They are fairly simple to make and can come in a variety of colors, such as pink.

=== Yoyos (yo-yos) or Besos ("kisses") ===
Yoyos (yo-yos), also known as Besos ("kisses"), are a Mexican pastry that resembles the shape of a yo-yo toy. They are sandwich cookies that have a filling typically consisting of raspberry or strawberry jam.

== Religious and seasonal pan dulce ==
With the invention of pan dulce in Mexico, other significant breads were produced to celebrate special occasions and traditions, such as rosca de reyes and pan de muerto. These special breads are part of the traditional customs that have been around for centuries. The stories behind these special occasional breads derive from religious beliefs, the dominant being Roman Catholic.

=== Rosca de reyes ===
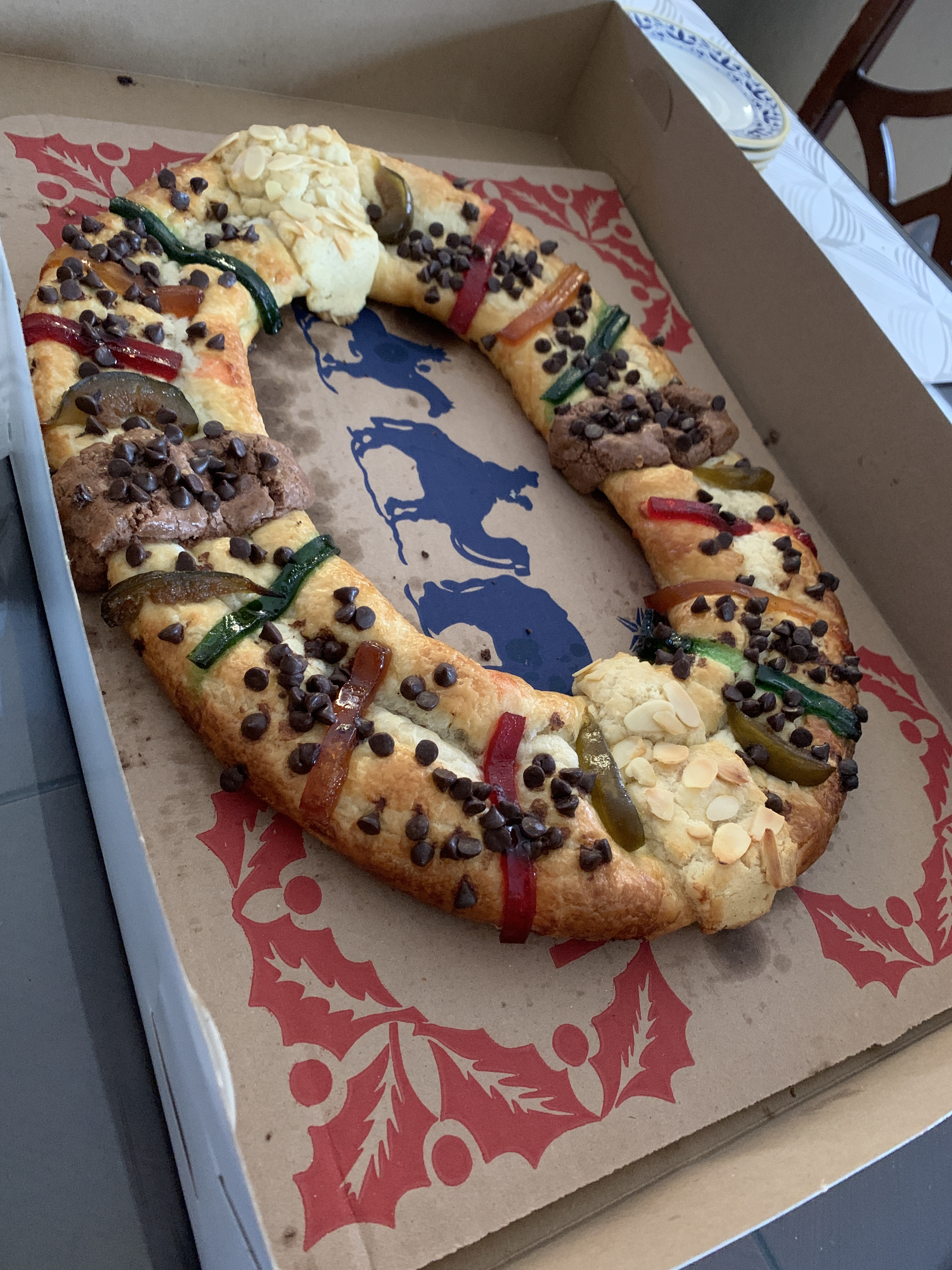
Rosca de reyes in its box

Rosca de reyes ("kings' crown") is a pan dulce that is shaped in a ring and topped with candied fruit. It's eaten and given as a gift on Dia de los Reyes Magos, or Three Kings Day. Baked inside is a small plastic or ceramic figurine. Whoever cuts a slice and finds the small figurine is obligated to host a party for Fiesta de la Candelaria, which occurs on February 2.

=== Pan de muerto ===
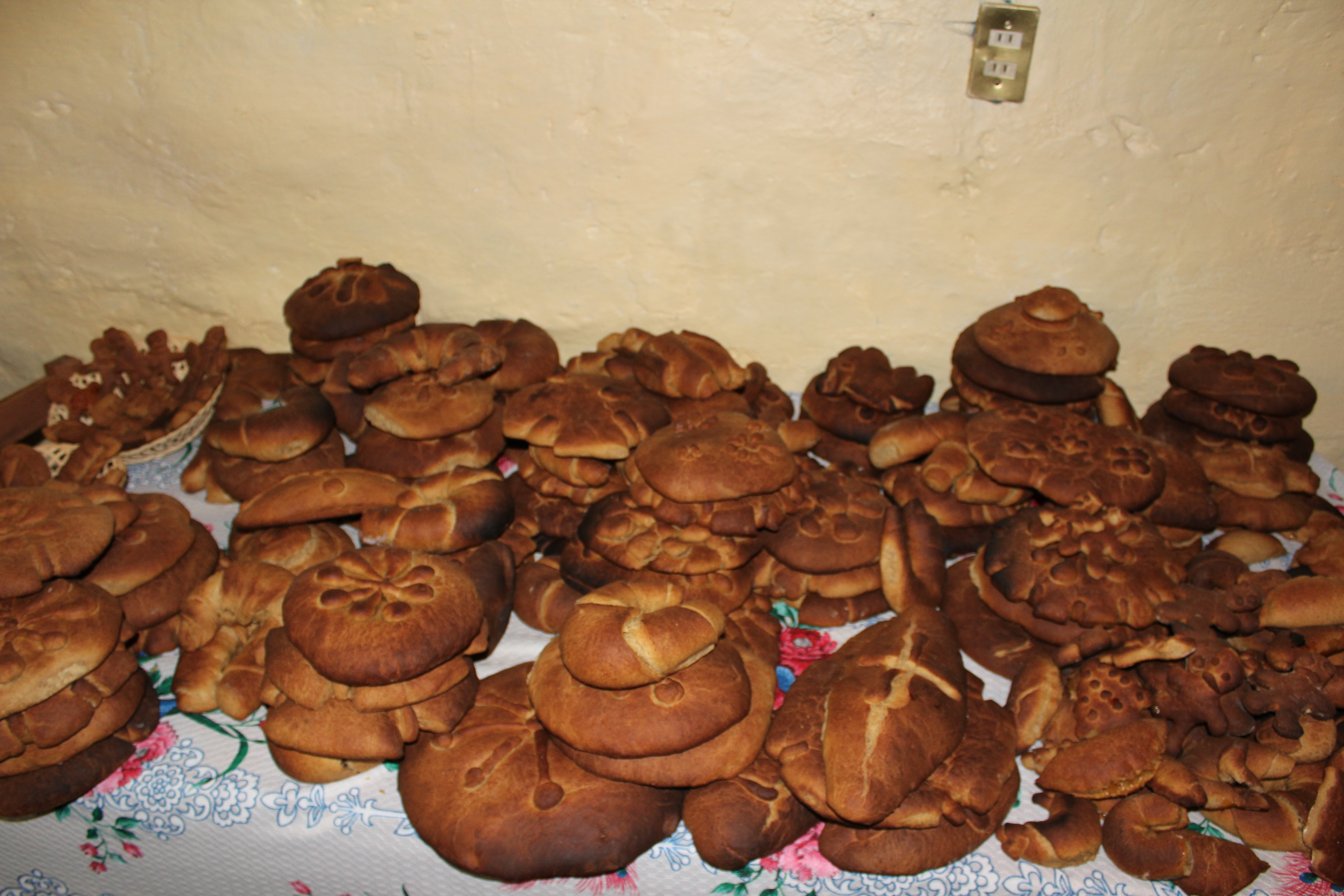
One of the many types of pan de muerto

Pan de muerto ("bread of the dead") is a special bread that is consumed and offered as a part of the Día de Muertos celebration in October and November. It's decorated with extra dough that is shaped to resemble bones and coated with sugar. The dough itself is traditionally flavored with orange and anise. They are placed on the ofrenda as an offering to loved ones who have passed on.

== Cultural significance ==
Pan dulce is considered to be a Mexican cuisine. Other countries in Latin America and even Europe have adapted some of Mexico's pastries, but it is in Mexico that the creative new shapes originate. Today, pan dulce is seen in many parts of the United States, especially in places like California, Arizona, and Texas, as a result of migration.

=== Mexico ===
In Mexico, pan dulce is typically consumed at breakfast or evening supper. It is usually accompanied by hot chocolate, milk (often warm), or coffee, and is dipped into the drink for a different taste. Pan dulce has become an important staple in the lives of Mexicans, in the way that people not only eat it, but bond together with family. Pan dulce or bread in general is always present in very important events and celebration of the people from Mexico.

=== United States ===
Pan dulce can be found in Mexican markets or panaderias (bakeries) in many U.S. states. Though pan dulce may not be consumed as frequently, it is commonly consumed in Hispanic or Latino homes. While Americans don't usually partake in celebrations or events related to the seasonal types of pan dulce, pan dulce is still enjoyed by everyone.

== See also ==
- Latin American cuisine
- List of pastries
- List of sweet breads
- Mexican breads
- Mexican cuisine
