= Long Live Death =

Long Live Death (English: either "Long Live Death" or "Live the Death", German: Es lebe der Tod) may refer to:

- Tatort: Es lebe der Tod 2016 German television film and TV episode of the series Tatort
- Viva la muerte (film), by Fernando Arrabal
- Viva la Muerte (Cobra Verde album), 1994
- Viva la Muerte (Inkubus Sukkubus album), 2008

== See also ==
- Long Live Your Death, a 1971 Italian/Spanish/German film
