= Isla Muerta =

Isla Muerta may refer to:

- Isla de Muerta, a setting from the Pirates of the Caribbean series
- Isla de Muerta (album), an album by Ten
- Isla Muerta, a fictional island off the coast of Costa Rica in Michael Crichton's The Lost World
- La isla de la muerte (Island of the Doomed), the alternate title of Maneater of Hydra
