= Mexican breads =

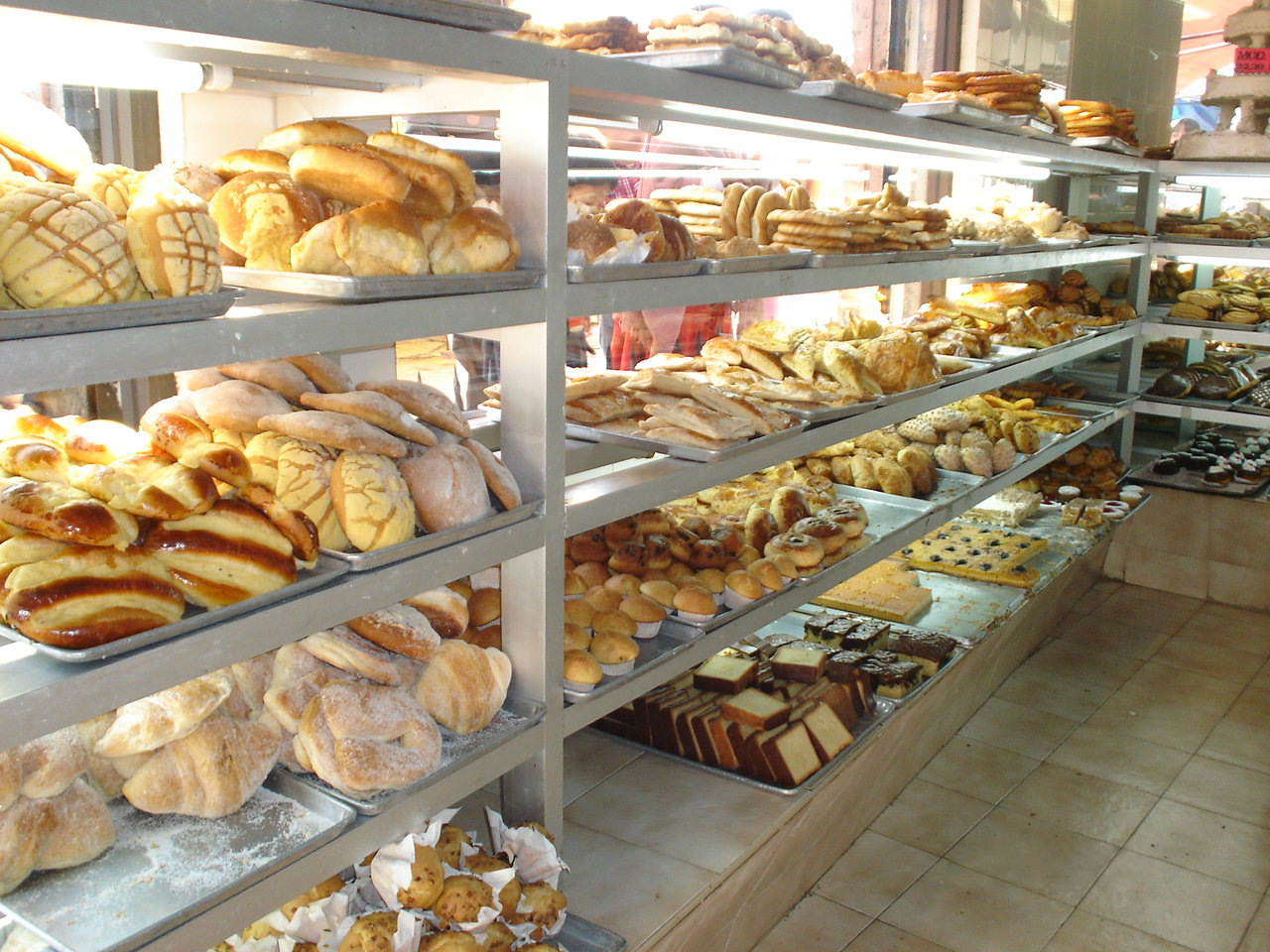
Breads inside a Mexican bakery

Mexican breads and other Mexican baked goods were made from the blending of influence from various European baking traditions. Wheat, and the bread baked from it, was introduced by the Spanish at the time of the Conquest.

The French influence in Mexican Bread is the strongest; for example the bolillo evolved from the French baguette and the concha branched out from the French brioche. The terminology is also derived from French. A baño maría, meaning a water bath for a custard like budín comes from the French word bain marie.

While the consumption of wheat has never surpassed that of corn in the country, wheat is still a staple food and an important part of both everyday life and special rituals. Mexico has adopted various bread styles from Europe and the United States, but most of the varieties of breads made in the country were developed in Mexico. However, there is little to no baking done in Mexican homes; instead, Mexicans have bought their baked goods from bakeries (and street vendors) since the colonial period.

== Traditional Mexican bakeries ==
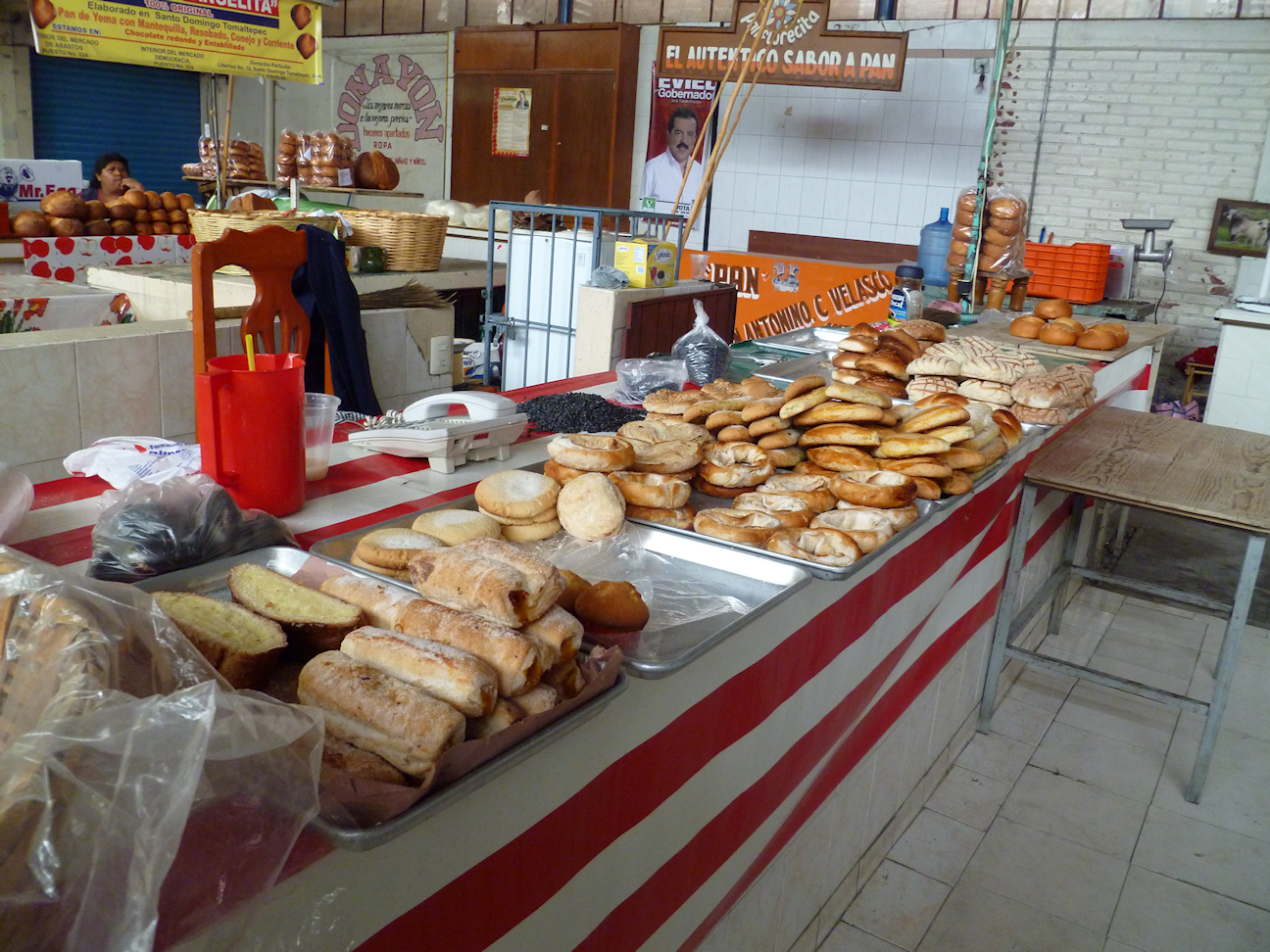
Bread for sale in Oaxaca

Como pan caliente (like hot bread) is a Mexican expression that means that something is popular or in demand. Wheat bread is second only to the corn tortillas and its use can indicate social class and ethnicity. Mexicans do not generally make their own baked goods, even in the past when they generally made their own tortillas. White bread is most often consumed as part of street food such as tortas or as part of large meals as an alternative to tortillas. Sweet breads are most commonly consumed in the morning as part of breakfast or at night, as part of a ritual called "merienda," a small meal taken between 6 and 8pm, along with a hot beverage such as coffee or hot chocolate.

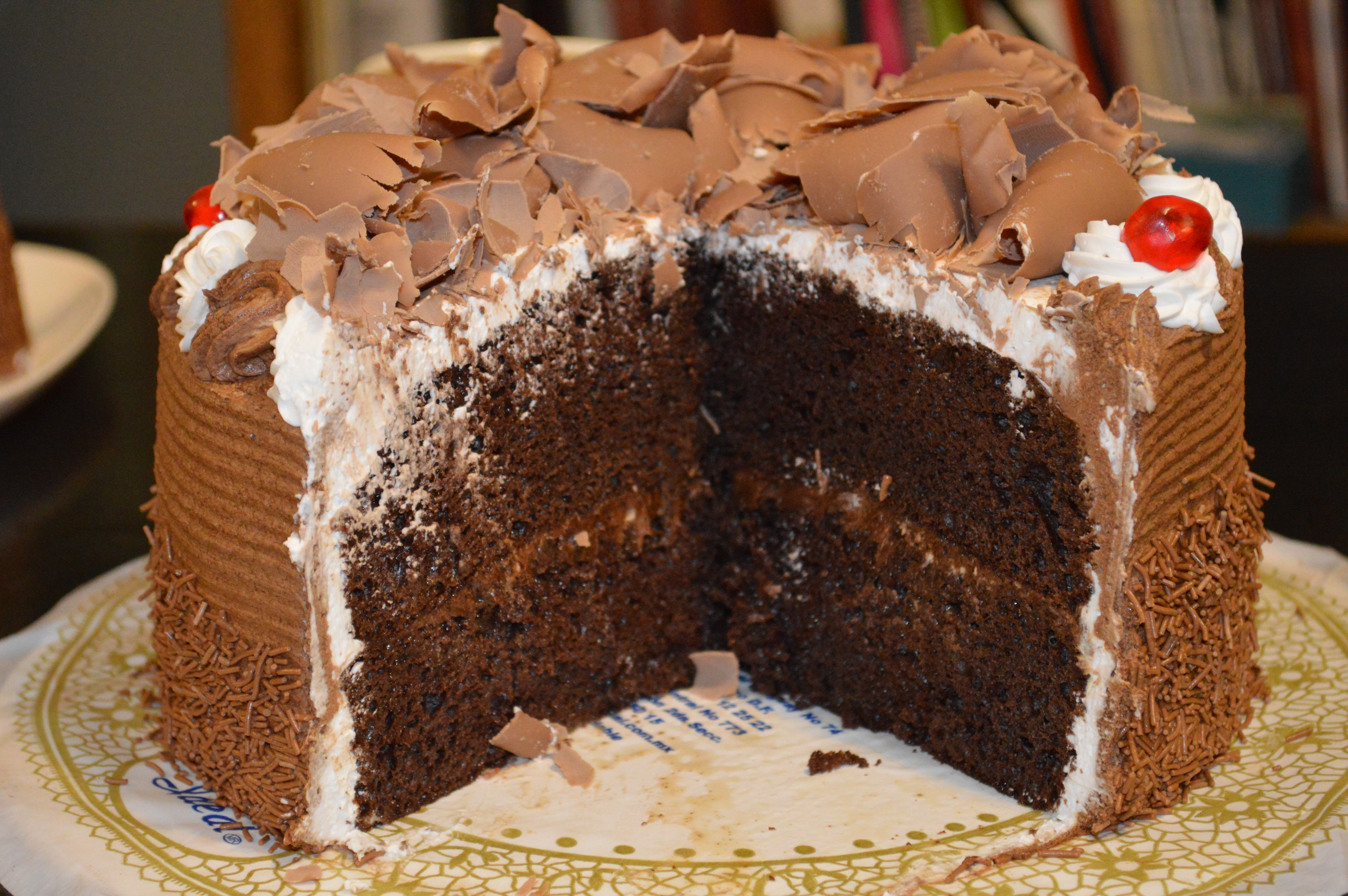
Chocolate truffle cake from a bakery in Mexico City

The folklore of the panadero (bread seller) is a man on a bicycle balancing a large bread basket over his head. Though less common as it once was, it can still be seen in various locations. The most common way to buy bread is through small family bakeries located in the center of small towns or in strategic locations in neighborhoods, generally within walking distance of most peoples houses. Often one of the family's routines is to send someone to the bakery at a certain time to get the freshest bread possible. The bread making sector is one of the most stable in Mexico, as it is a basic necessity, but it often struggles with efforts to control prices and the rising cost of production. The sale of traditional breads in supermarkets has also impacted neighborhood bakeries.

Mexican bakeries often specialize in those who create cakes (pastelerías) and those that make white and sweet breads (panaderías) but there is overlap. The making of cakes in a pastelería is considered more refined, and those making "repostería" finer still, but in areas where there is more social strata, they are often segregated. The average bakery makes about a hundred varieties of breads through the year. The flour used is still made from the same category of wheat used since the colonial period, although cross experimentation with other varieties have modified the stalks to be more resistant to breaking. Most bakeries used commercially prepared yeast, but avoid preservatives with some bakers insisting that it spoils the taste of the products.

Traditional Mexican bakeries have inherited a set up and work system from the colonial period. Baking bread is considered a trade, learned through apprenticeship although child labor laws have limited how this system can be put into effect. Baking jobs are hierarchical, with bakers able to advance as they acquire more stills. However, men dominate the making of baked goods with few exceptions. Female employees usually found at the counter in the front.

The baking area is called the amasijo, from the word for "to knead." It is set in the back of the establishment. The back area contain various tables, mixers and other equipment, the most notable of which is the oven, usually set into one wall. These ovens can be gas or firewood. Older bakeries in small towns may have ovens large enough to walk into with the wood added from an outer door. The flour initially left to ferment with yeast is called madre (mother), and bits of this used to prepare various types of dough. The mixing and kneading of large quantities of ingredients is now done by commercial electric mixers. However, the final kneading in smaller batches is still done by hand by most baking businesses. Pastries are made by the most experienced bakers who have a higher status, often the master baker and/or owner of the bakery. The various stages of bread making occur at the same time in the different stations, with rising and already baked breads on racks in certain corners. These racks are usually of metal but some older wooden ones can still be found. Cleaning is a constant activity to keep up with the constant baking during shifts.

When baked goods are ready, workers move them from the amasijo to the front of the shop on large trays that they place on shelves. In the self access system, customers take circular trays and tongs and select their breads. They take the tray full of their selections to a counter, where someone counts the breads and calculates a price. Then they pay at a separate station, using a ticket with the total price. Panaderias may have a section dedicated to cakes and or pastries with cream or fruit filling, which are often keep on refrigerated shelves. It is common to see a niche dedicated to a saint, especially the Virgin of Guadalupe and San Judas Tadeo in Mexico City near the counter or the cash register, along with a piece of currency from the first sale of the business, candles and flowers.

Mexican baked goods have become important in certain regions in the United States, especially in areas with large ethnic Mexican populations. In Los Angeles the 1920s there were only a few bakeries that made Mexican style breads but this has increased greatly with the increase in the Mexican population and the acceptance of a number of these breads in other ethnic groups. In addition the conglomerate Grupo Bimbo, the world's largest baking company, has bought a number of foreign baking companies and operates them under their original names and has introduced some of its products from Mexico to foreign markets.

== Taxonomy of Mexican breads and other baked goods ==
=== Variety ===
Centuries of experimentation and influence from various European baking traditions has led to the current modern selection found in most Mexican bakeries. Most Mexican breads are unique, linked to Mexico's history and culture. Mexico has since surpassed Spain in the variety of breads it makes and has one of the most varied bread traditions with estimates ranging from over 300 to over 1000. Even small bakeries have a wide variety.

=== Bakery breads ===
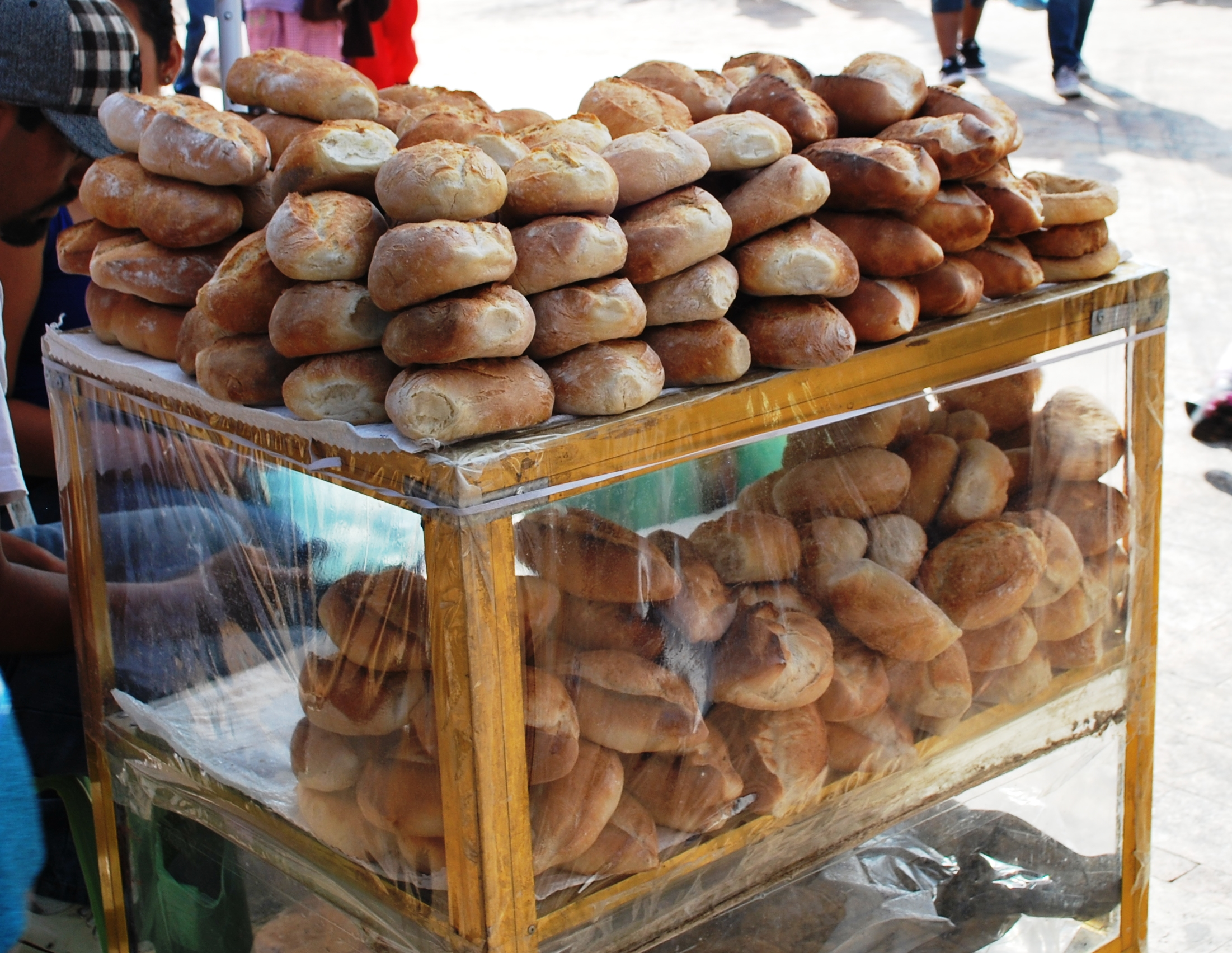
Cart selling bolillos (crusty rolls) in San Juan de los Lagos, Jalisco

In the 20th century, there has been some industrialization of bread making, with the leader in this field being Bimbo. This multinational has production facilities in sixteen cities in the world, which has had some success in exporting Mexican bread styles. However, by far the most traditional Mexican breads are still mostly sold in the country.

One reason for the lack of definition in the number of varieties of bread is the naming. Names for breads can vary from region to region and even from bakery to bakery. Some have whimsical, even mischievous names due to the bawdy reputation of bakers in the past as well as experimentation as one of the ways to keep entertained during the work shift. The names come from Mexican culture and society as well as obvious cues such as shape such as corbata (bow tie) violín (violin), or ojo de buey (ox eye) a puffy pastry filled with bread dough with a shape of an eye, others have no clear meaning like Chilindrinas. Some breads have names from Mexico's history—Carlota refers to the empress of Mexico in the 19th century. There are breads named duque (duke) and polka. Some relate to common women's names such as Carmela and Margarita, and other refer to other foods such as taco, elote (corn) and zapote (a fruit).

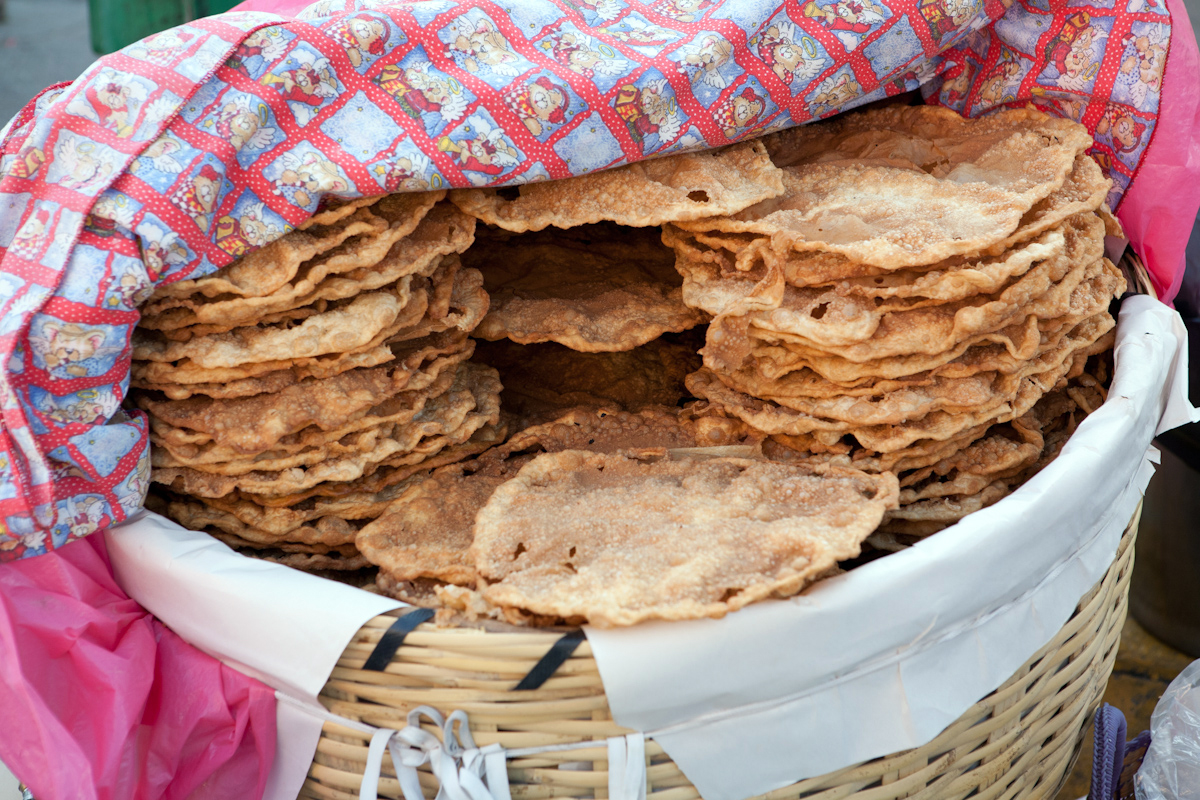
Buñuelos

Sometimes names change in new locations. A kind of twisted sweet bread is called alamar in most of Mexico but in Mexican communities in Los Angeles, it is referred to as a “freeway” in reference to the various interchanges in the area. For Mexican communities in the United States, Mexican breads can take on new names and some of these are in English, either by translation of the name (“rope” instead of lazo) or by comparison to something similar in that country. It also goes the other way. Dona is a Spanish adaptation of “donut.” Panque ( from pound cake), sometimes called a queque usually refers to individual-sized pound cakes or cupcakes.

In general, the categories of bread derive from the type of dough (or batter). Some shapes, such as roscas (rings) or cuernos (crescents), may be made with different doughs, but are distinguished by different names. Breads of the same category have the same basic flavor, but differ in shape and additives. Conchas, monjas, limas, chilidrinas and negritos are the same basic sweet bread but with toppings that make them look quite different from one another.

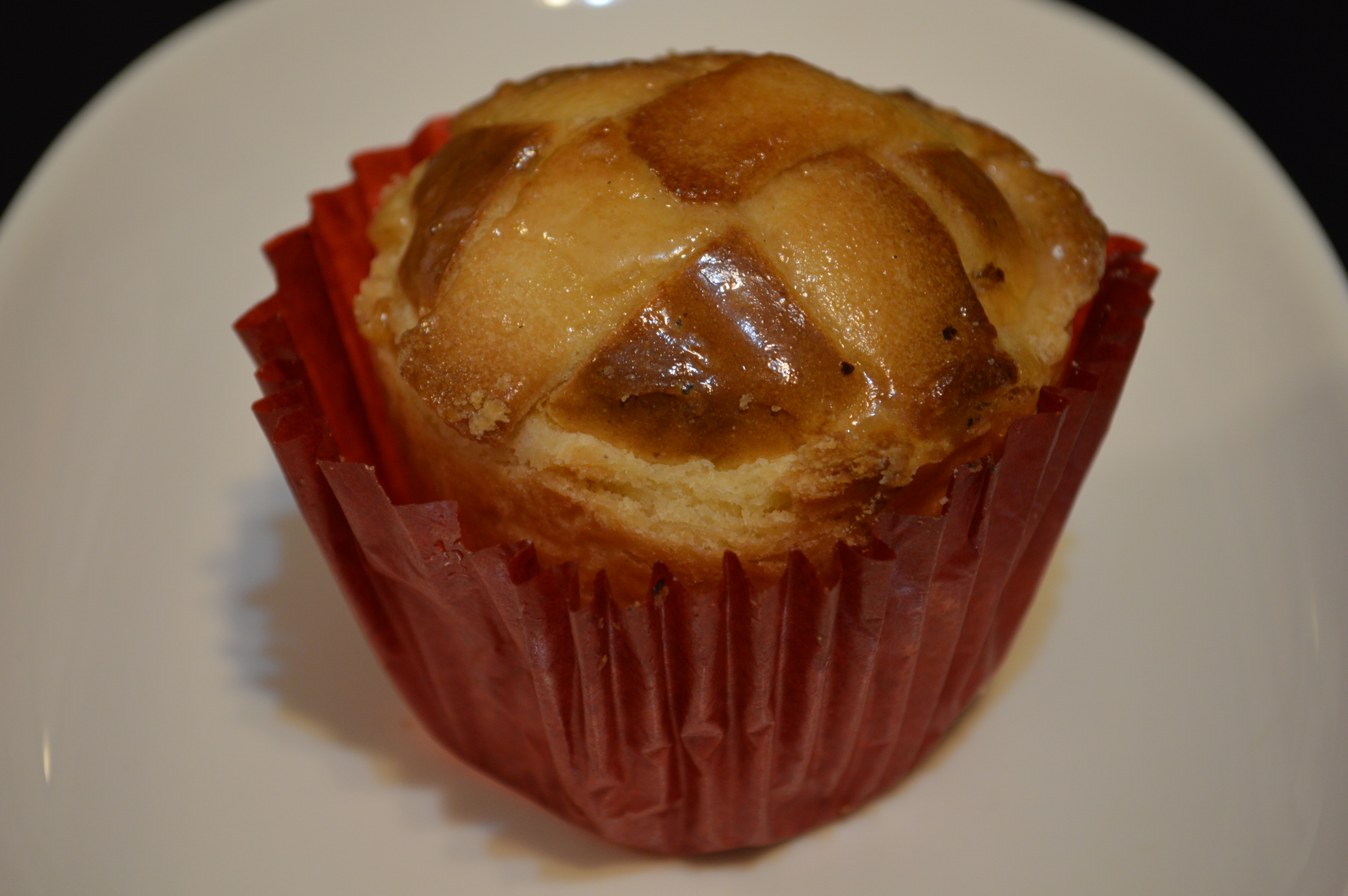
Cubilete with pineapple filling

Many bread types are usually distinguished by shape—such as those that are roundish from the natural rising of the dough and bear names such as volcanes (volcanos) and almejas (clams). Other are made from strips of dough, most often used to create shapes similar to man-made objects—such as reja (grill or railing), estribo (stirrup), puro (cigar), libro (book), ladrillo (brick), and lazo (rope).

There are seventeen basic bread categories: pan fino (fine bread), fine bread with egg bread, egg bread, pan engranillado, hojaldrado (puff pastry), cemitas, picón, masa panque, cake/pastel, mantecado, cookies (galletas), paloteado, pambazo, enrollado, pan de agua (lit. water bread, no other liquid used), masa feite, pucha, danesa (Danish), pan de vapor (steamed bread), pan agrio (sourdough) and pan de maiz (corn bread).

The most common breads sold are still basic white breads for sandwiches and other meals. These are made with a simple flour dough with only a little salt and/or sugar for flavoring. These include españolas, bolos, pan de agua, violines, estribos, cuernos, pan de mesa, virotes, juiles, pambazos and teleras.

The most variety comes in sweet breads because of the wide variety of flavorings and fillings. Vanilla and cinnamon are important ingredients in many of the sweet breads. Other important flavorings include almonds, coconut, sesame, peanuts, walnuts, chocolate, tequila, rum, orange peel, strawberry preserves, quince jelly, apricot preserves, apple and pineapple. In some breads, which need to puff greatly, finely ground tequesquite (saltpeter or potassium/sodium nitrate) is used. The use of this ingredient has been documented since the 1700s. Most sweet breads are baked but some are fried, usually using beef or pork fat, sometimes butter. The most popular of these are churros and buñuelos.

=== Specialty breads ===
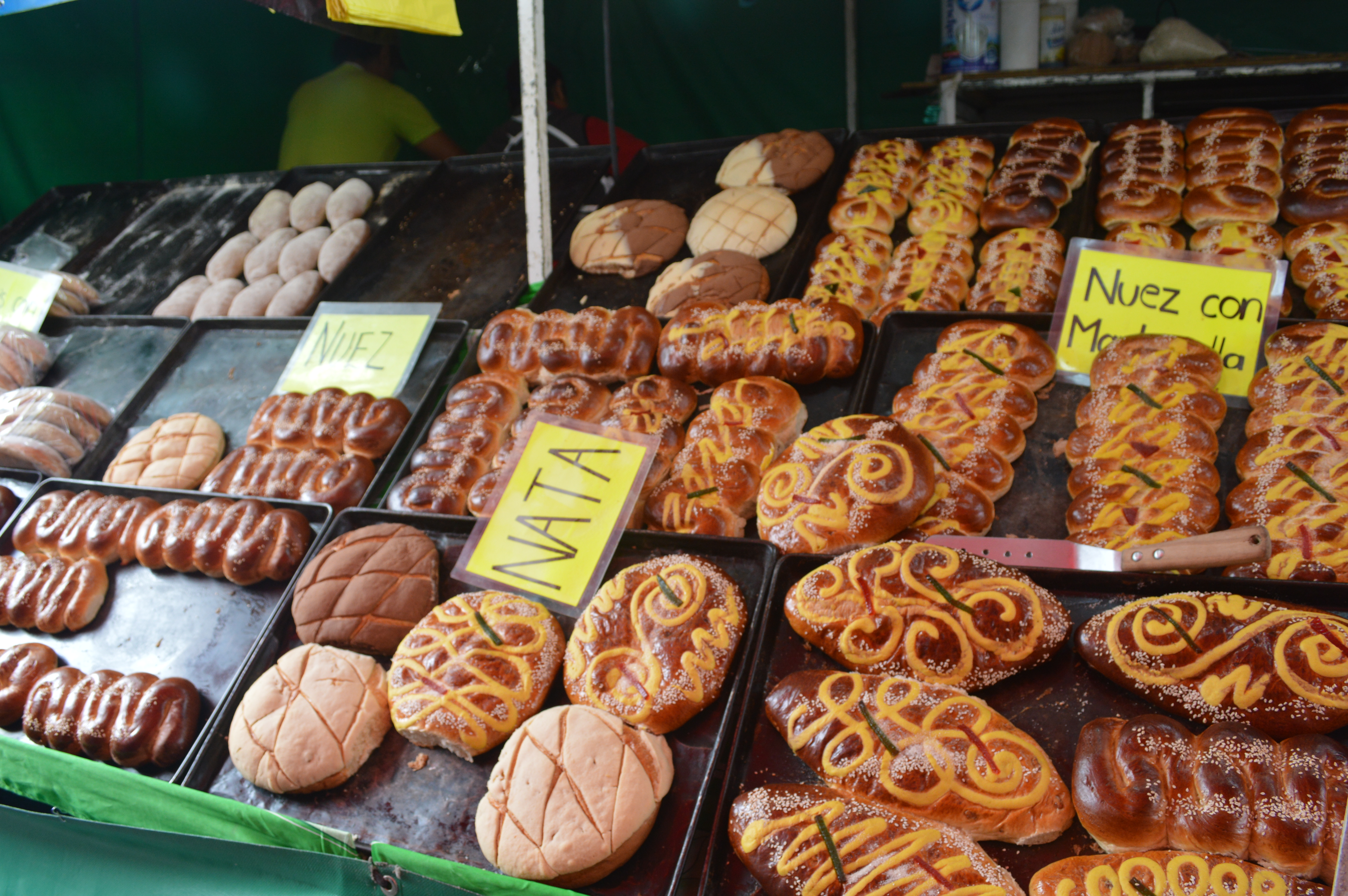
Sweet breads on display at a local fair in Mexico

There are a number of events and festivals that are traditionally celebrated with specific kinds of breads and pastry, which include patron saints’ days. They may be sweet or white breads and are often served with drinks such as atole and hot chocolate. Breads made with picón dough, made with rich ingredients such as eggs, milk, cream or canned milk are common for festive occasions, such as Easter Sunday, when Christians are once again free from Lenten dietary rules. On other occasions more common breads and cakes are decorated for holidays such as Christmas, Valentine's Day, Independence Day and commemorations of the Battle of Puebla.

One traditional festival bread is pan de pulque, which as its name implies, is made with the fermented sap of the maguey plant and most popular in the center and south of Mexico. It comes in various shapes and with various toppings and is generally sold by wandering vendors with their own bakery trucks that travel among the many town and religious fairs around Mexico. These breads are also sometimes called pan de burro (donkey bread) because they were originally brought by vendors with these animals.

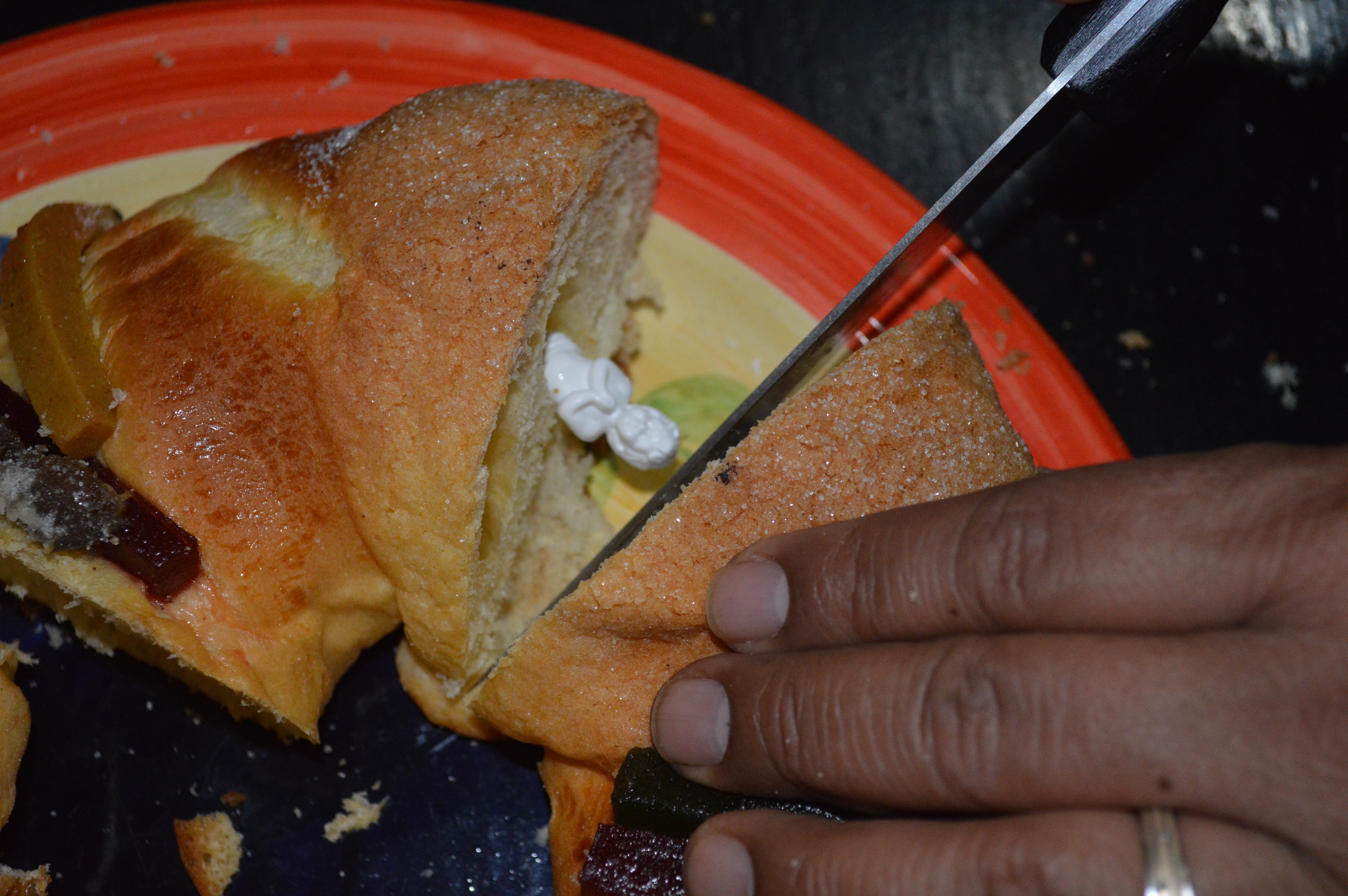
Rosca de reyes cut showing infant Jesus image

The rosca de reyes (king's ring) is the traditional sweet bread made for Epiphany, January 6. This is a ring bread, of Roman origin, which used to be filled with cream but in Mexico is generally decorated with ate (quince cheese), raisins and nuts. It is traditionally eaten with hot chocolate. Inside the ring, there are small images of the infant Jesus and those who find one are responsible for providing tamales for Candlemas on February 2. This bread and tradition was brought to Mexico by the Spanish.

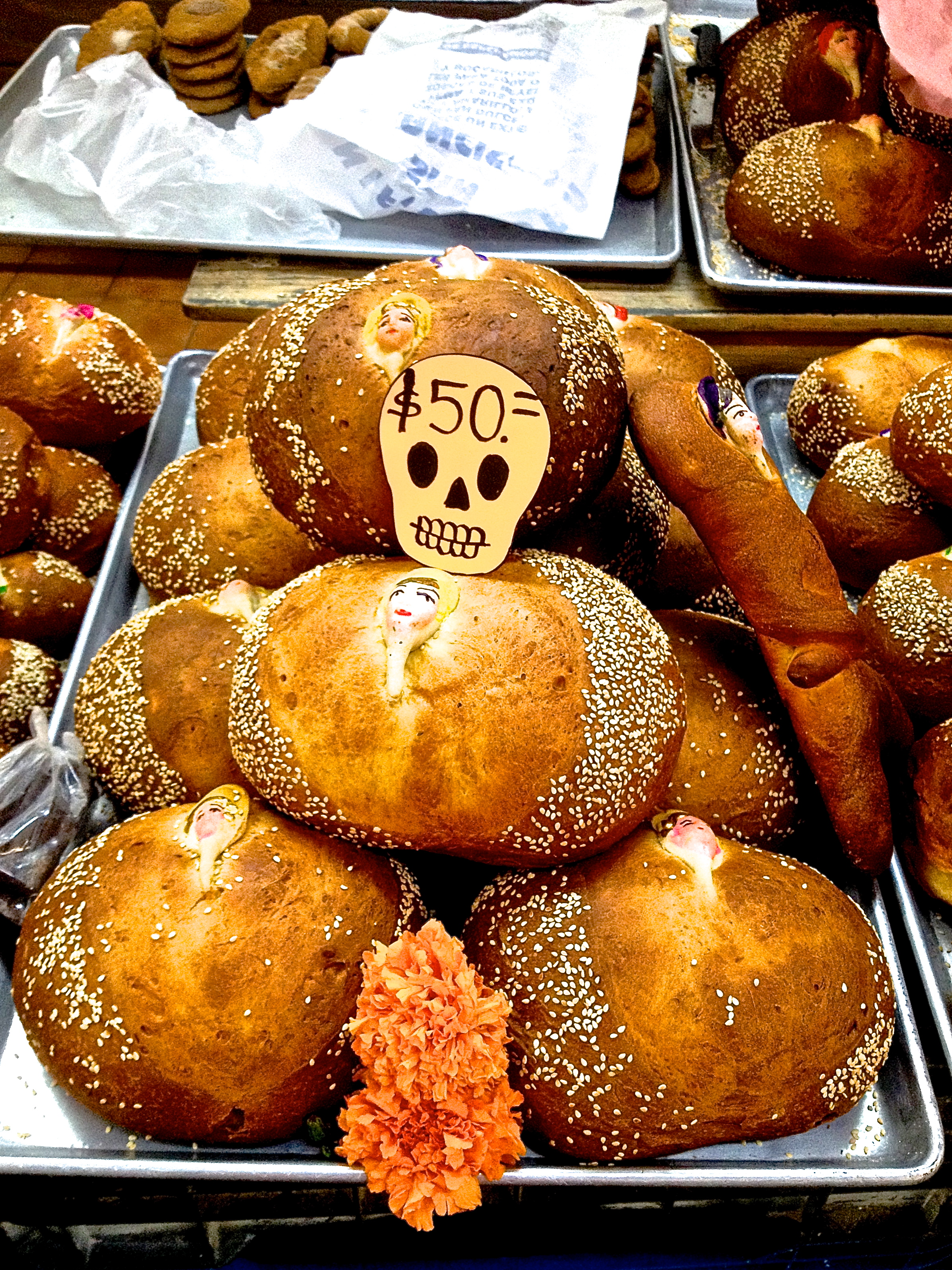
Oaxacan style pan de muerto

Pan de muerto (Bread of the Dead) is an important bread for Day of the Dead, especially in states with large indigenous populations such as Michoacán, State of Mexico, Guerrero, Puebla, Tlaxcala, Veracruz, Hidalgo, Chiapas and Oaxaca, as well as Mexico City. For this occasion, bakeries turn out hundreds of loaves of this slightly sweet bread, which is often used as an offering on altars as well as eaten by the living. Most of these breads are some kind of round shape with a criss cross of dough on top to indicate bones. However, there are some distinct variations such as those made with puff pastry and those in shapes of sheep, hearts, hands, dead persons and highly decorated wheel formations. In Oaxaca, there are breads for this day decorated with small painted heads made from flour and water. There are variations such as in Hidalgo where elements are colored red, indicating pre-Hispanic influence as that color was associated with death.

=== Regional breads ===
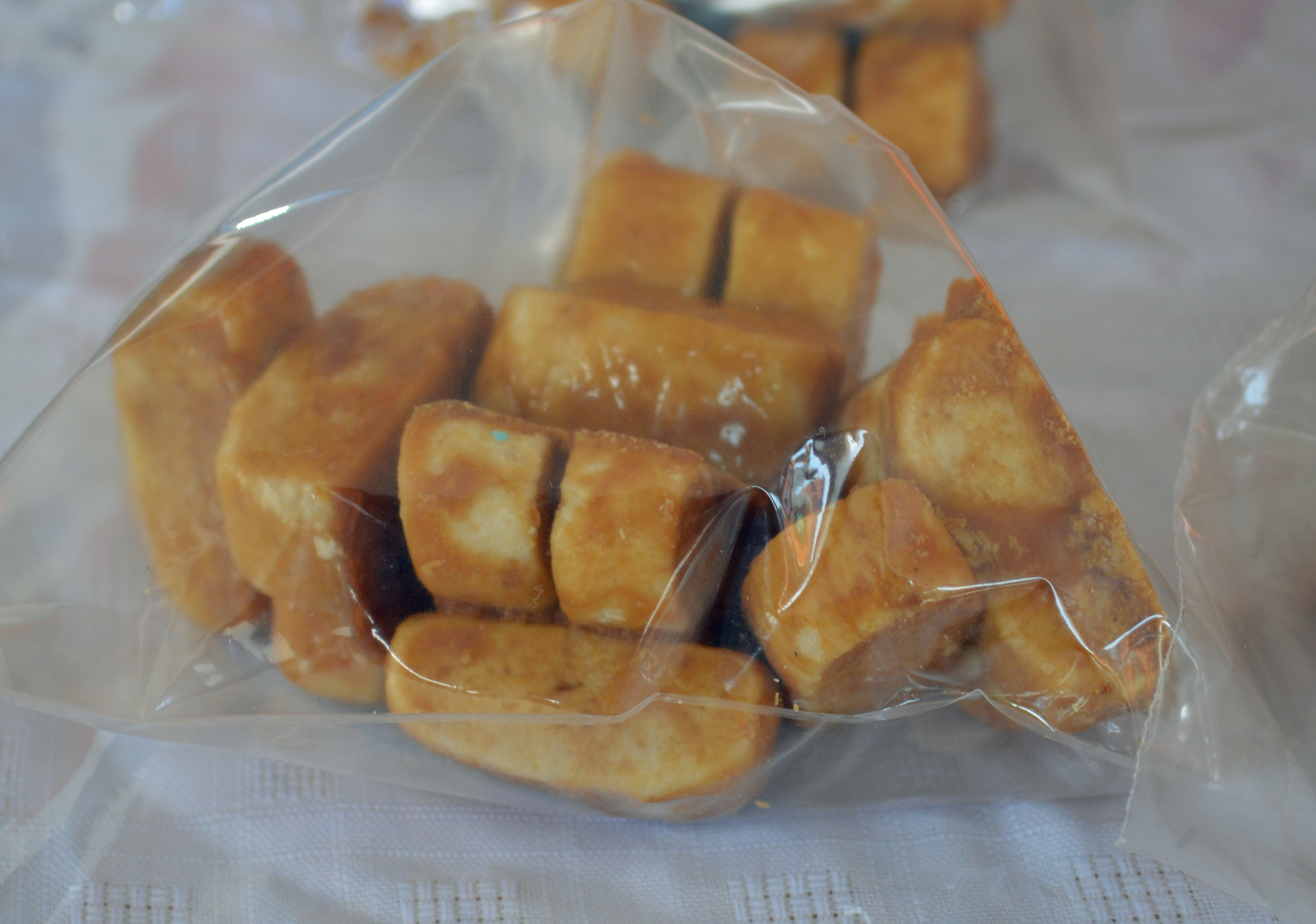
Muégano

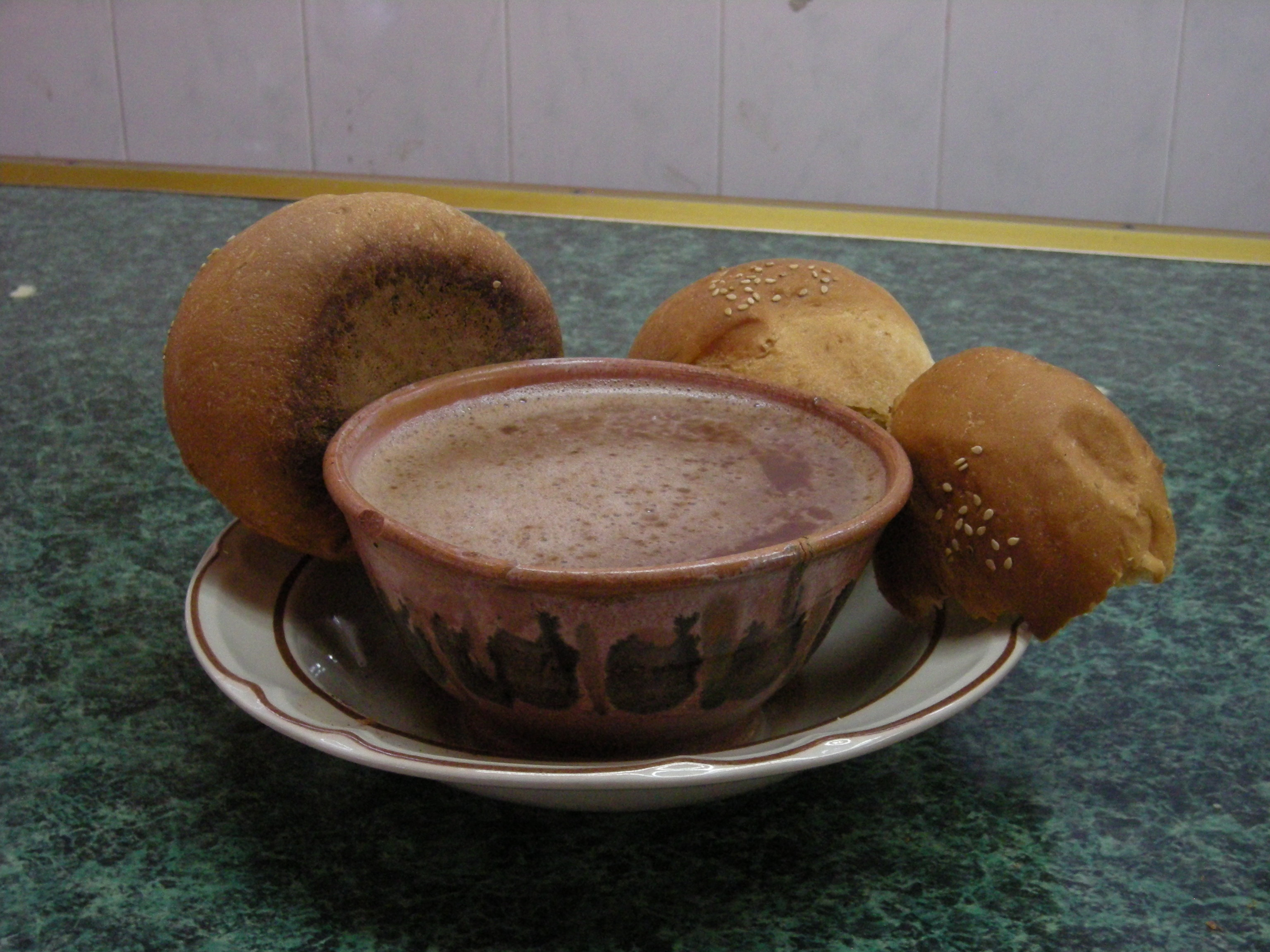
Pan de yema (egg bread) with hot chocolate served at a market in the city of Oaxaca

Mexican breads also vary by region. More localized specialties include ladrillos in Aguascalientes; mestizas, pan de mujer and biscotelas in Sinaloa; coricos in Sonora and Sinaloa; coyotas in Sinaloa and Sonora (where is a traditional dish) and northern Sinaloa; semas in Durango and Coahuila; muéganos in Huamantla and Tehuacán, Puebla; cocoles and cheese-filled bread in Perote, Veracruz; pan de yema in Oaxaca; turcos in Nuevo León; aguacatas in Michoacán; fragiles and doradas campechanas in Santa María del Río, SLP and picones de huevos/picones de nata in Lagos de Moreno, Jalisco.

Certain towns have reputations for particularly fine baked goods. These include Tingüindín, Michoacan, Acámbaro, Guanajuato, Chilapa de Álvarez, Guerrero, San Juan Huactzinco, Tlaxcala and Totolac, Tlaxcala.

== History of baking in Mexico ==
=== Colonial period ===
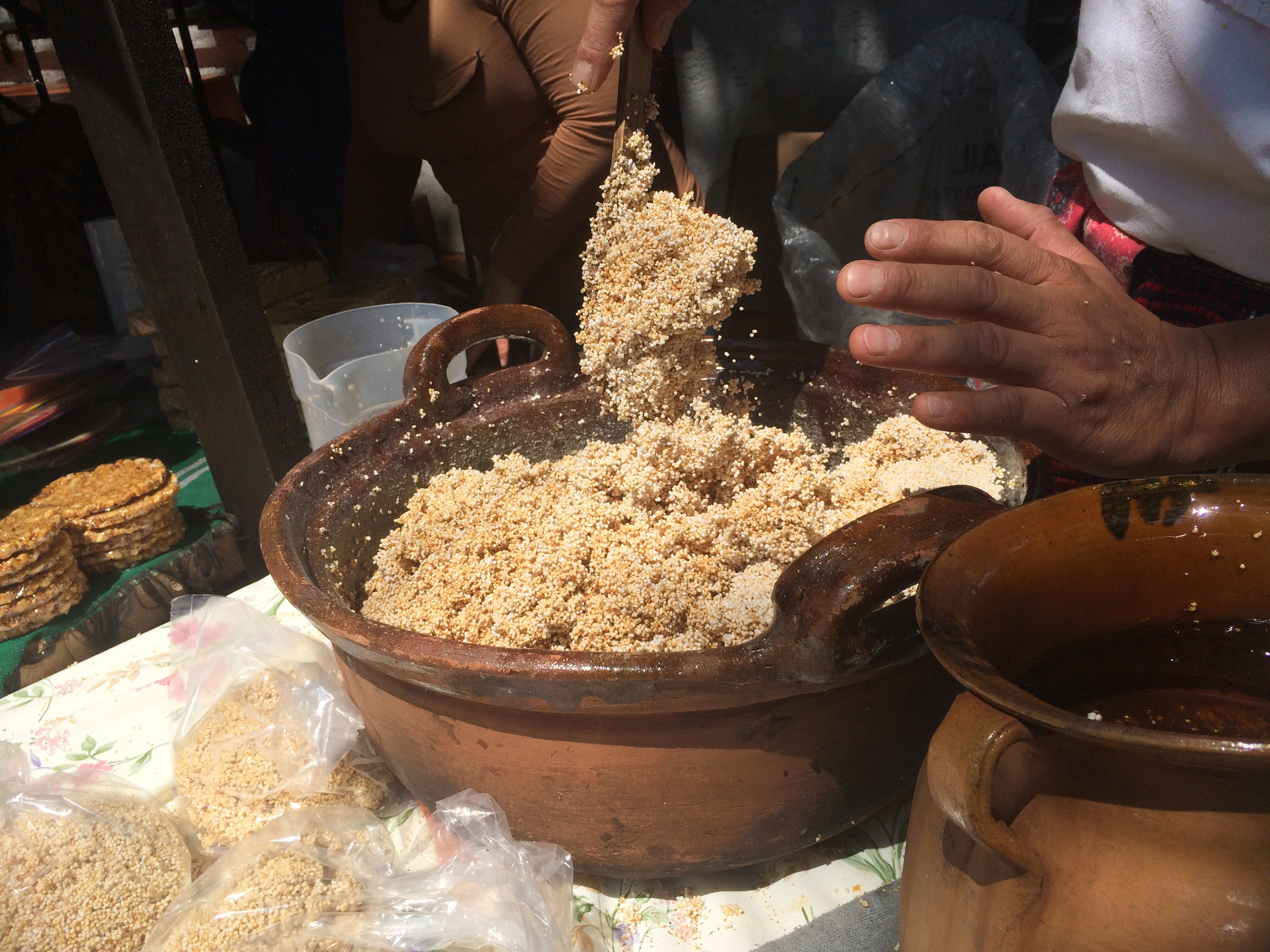
Mixing amaranth and maguey syrup

Before the Spanish conquest of the Aztec Empire, there were no baked goods in the European sense of the word. The main grain staple was (and today still is) corn made into flat breads called tortillas and steamed corn dough wrapped in corn husks or banana leaves called tamales. Other grain products include amaranth, toasted on comals and formed with maguey sap into shapes. The Chichimecas made a flour from mesquite beans to make a kind of flat bread.

Wheat and baking with it was introduced by the Spanish at the time of the Conquest. Wheat was considered a necessity because it was the only grain recognized as acceptable for the making of communion wafers. This was particularly true to eliminate the formerly sacred grain of amaranth, which the indigenous used to shape into gods and eat. The first wheat crop was planted on land belonging to Hernán Cortés who later gifted it to Juan Garrido, a freed slave and one of the first bakers of the colonial period. The first bakeries were established in the 1520s. While European bakeries at the time were family businesses, passed down for generations, the conquistadors wanted to avoid manual labor, so they taught the indigenous to make bread for them. A tradition of home baking was never really established both because of this and the fact that very few households could afford to have ovens.

At first there was only a small market for bread, both because the initial products were poor, and the indigenous would not eat bread at first. However, as quality improved and the Spanish and mestizo population grew, so did the market for bread. Although the consumption of wheat never surpassed that of corn, bread did become an important staple, and the limitation of its production to bakeries made these businesses important institution.

During the entire colonial period, bakeries were heavily regulated. Hernán Cortés himself issued the first wheat milling licenses and, to control prices, ordered breads sold in the main squares of towns. Colonial authorities fixed the amount of wheat used, weights of breads, and prices. Each bakery had to mark their products with a seal for identification purposes. Growers of wheat had to sell to millers who then sold the flour to bakeries. All businesses has to report sales and purchases to the government. The aim of all this regulation was to ensure a supply of inexpensive bread and prevent market manipulation. However, it was not very effective because of corruption and practices of adulterating the wheat.

Because baking became a trade, regulations also included the formation of guilds and titles of master baker. Guild members had monopolistic privileges such as sales at the markets for the upper classes and control over most of the rest of the market for breads. These members had to be of Spanish descent, and even though there was some selling of breads outside of guild bakeries, such as those made by indigenous women who learned as helpers at convents, they risked punishment for doing so. Being a guild member carried high status, but the work was done by employees who had no chance to advance.

Until the early 20th century, life for bakery workers was exceedingly hard. The work of baking, especially kneading dough was physically taxing and workers had shifts of between 14 and 18 hours a day. The lack of ventilation and unhygienic conditions left bakers susceptible to respiratory infections, tuberculosis, throat and nasal ulcers and more. Spanish owners exploited the lowest classes of colonial society, often entrapping workers with debt peonage and using forced labor by convicts, who could receive sentences of years of kneading dough. By the 18th century about 90% of bakers were indigenous, with the rest being mulattos or mestizos. Most died young from either illness and/or alcoholism.

The popularity of bread grew over time with a number of meals, especially breakfast, dependent on it. In the colonial period, breakfast of sweet bread with hot chocolate became fashionable, with the chocolate replaced by coffee at the end of the 17th century. This tradition has been mostly lost, but can still be found in many parts of Mexico. By the end of the 17th century, there were hundreds of bakeries found in all of Mexico's main colonial cities. Sales were made at these bakeries, as well as in neighborhood grocery shops, traditional markets and by wandering vendors.

Mexico's wide variety of breads had its start in the colonial period as well. Bread styles soon became differentiated by social class, with the best and whitest breads, called pan floreado, reserved for the nobility and rich. The lower classes ate “pambazo,” made with darker flour. The word is a mix of pan (bread) and basso (low) and today refers to a kind of street food. French influence on Mexican baking also started in the colonial period, leading one staple bread still found today, the bolillo (similar to a crust French roll). Colonial era monasteries and convents were also an early source of innovation, as they baked their own breads both for their own consumption and as a means of giving charity to the poor. In the 17th century, Sor Juana Inés de la Cruz did a transcription of her convent's cookbook, with half the recipes dedicated to breads. These institutions developed recipes for buñueles, empanadas, and more that are still made today.

Although the earliest breads were the most basic, bakeries specializing in sweet breads, called bizcocherías in Mexico, are noted as early as 1554, and are well-established by the end of the 17th century. By the end of the 18th century, most bakeries had people dedicated to sweet breads and more varieties are recorded, especially in cafés, made popular by Italian immigrants in Mexico City.

=== 19th century ===
After the Mexican War of Independence, colonial era regulations of bakeries were loosened in the hopes of improving working conditions for bakery workers. However, this was not successful, mostly because the need to keep bread prices down for the general populace meant keeping many of the old practices, especially forced labor and debt peonage.

The volatile political situation and the distaste that many of the established creole families had for the baking business meant that bakeries changed hands frequently. In the middle and late 19th century, this allowed entrepreneurs from Europe such as the French, Italians, Austrian and Basques to enter the market. Their participation expanded the number of bakeries and added innovation to the repertoire of breads. One of these was Italian Manuel Mazza who settled in Oaxaca and founded his business. He later became the father in law of Benito Juárez. The El Globo bakery chain in Mexico City was established in 1884 by the Italian Tronconi family. During the regime of Porfirio Díaz, French breads and pastries were particularly favored, especially in cafés in Mexico City. In addition, U.S. style loaf or sandwich bread was introduced during the Mexican–American War. While new styles were introduced, these new owners adopted traditional Mexican employment and monopolistic practices, including alliances by marriage.

What they did do was greatly increase the number of bakeries, allowing many people to be within walking distance of an establishment. Before that, most people bought their bread from wandering vendors. By 1880, there were 78 bakeries in Mexico City along with many more indigenous people who sold their own breads on the streets and markets. By the 20th century, a number of these bakeries gained reputation, such as La Vasconia.

While employment practices did not change during most of this century, an important strike in 1895 signaled the beginning of the end for them, ending the practice of enclosing bakery workers in dormitories during non-working hours.

=== 20th century to the present ===
Although able to leave the bakeries on their off time by the beginning of the 20th century, bakery workers still have 14 to 18 hours shifts, leaving little time for anything but sleep. Day of the Dead was one of few, if not the only holiday recognized by bakers. Much of the baking industry was in the hands of foreigners, especially Basques in Mexico City, which was the largest consumer of bread by far.

The Mexican Revolution allowed for major change in the baking industry, first by breaking down the old systems of food supply, especially in Mexico City, which became isolated by the civil war. The revolution also sparked labor activism. The bakers joined the larger labor movement, first with the Casa de Obrero Mundial organization in 1915, but this industry had a harder time gaining concessions despite the Venustiano Carranza government's union sympathies because of the need to feed the population with inexpensive bread. This allowed bakery owners to resist many of the demands of workers until 1928.

In the mid 20th century, there was innovation in production and sales. Mechanical kneaders and mixers were introduced at the beginning of this century. Up through 1940s, most bakeries displayed and sold their products in glass cases, requiring customers to ask counter workers to put together their order. In the 1950s, baker Antonio Ordóñez Ríos decided to do away with the glass in the cases and allow customers to choose their own breads and place them on a tray to be counted and charged by staff. This is the system used in most bakeries in Mexico today.

Since the mid 1950s, the variety of breads has diminished somewhat, but neighborhood bakeries still thrive, most of which make their own products. Bakeries still provide employment for many Mexicans, the basic white breads such as bolillos and teleras remain as staples, accounting for about 85% of all sales.

Mexican baking traditions have spread throughout its history and continues to spread. Migration of Mexican workers to the United States has prompted the opening of Mexican-style bakeries in that country. As a result of international acquisitions, Mexico City-headquartered Grupo Bimbo has become the largest producer of baked products in the world.

== See also ==
- List of baked goods
- List of sweet breads
- Pan dulce
