= Pambazo (bread) =

Type of white bread used in sandwiches

The pambazo or pan bazo is a white bread of wheat flour, yeast, water and salt, used in the Mexican sandwich called pambazo, which takes the name of the bread. It is about sixteen centimeters long, concave and oval. In its outer layer, it is golden and crispy, and in its inner part, it is white and very light. Not to be confused with telera, since it has a different consistency. There is also a Spanish pan bazo bread and a pambazo from Veracruz, Mexico.

== See also ==
- List of breads
