= Mollete de Antequera =

Type of bread from Andalusia, Spain

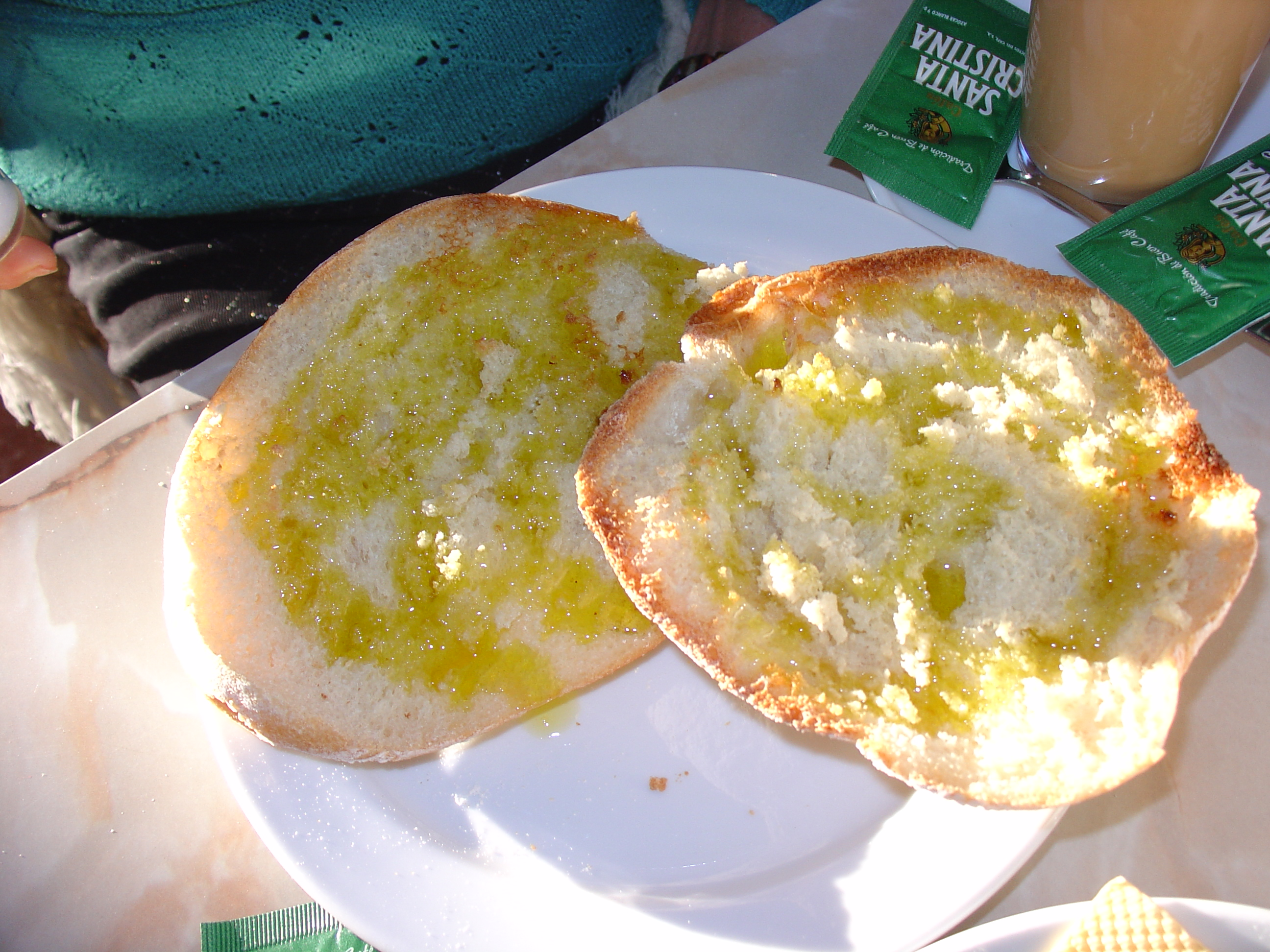
Toasted mollete, seasoned with olive oil and salt or sugar, is the traditional Andalusian breakfast.

The mollete de Antequera is a typical bread of Andalusia, Spain, that has a seal of protection IGP. There are a multitude of breads under the same name "mollete" in Andalusia, Extremadura and America. But the mollete de Antequera is characterized by a white and floured crust, and a soft crumb that easily crumbles, the result of a hydrated and lightly kneaded dough and a slow baking. The mollete de Antequera is one of the typical breads of Andalusia, the main feature of the Andalusian breakfast and is served either with olive oil, tomato, and jamón serrano or with manteca colorá.

It was certified as a Protected Geographical Indication by the European Union on November 10, 2020.

== Origin ==
The first mention of mollete is already in the Diccionario latino-español of 1492, in which it is defined by Nebrija as: "any bread that is spongy and muelle ('tender')". In Latin, panis tenellus means 'tender bread', also called panis tenellus ('delicate bread'), and referred to bread with a white and very spongy crumb, achieved through a short baking. It is a cognate of "molleta", a torta de pan made with harina de flor, originally from Old Castile, sometimes kneaded with milk, and also used to refer to brown breads of inferior quality. However, molletes are more typical of Andalusia and Extremadura. The same etymological origin can be found in the Catalan molla or molló ('miga') and in the French mollet or mollette ('bodigo'), as well as in the Spanish adjective "mollar" ('soft, easy to break').

== Elaboration ==
The mollete de Antequera is made with low-strength wheat flour (~W180), water, salt and yeast or sourdough. It is usually made with refined flour, which guarantees a refined white bread. However, sometimes brown molletes are also produced, i.e. the flour contains bran. The production process consists of seven phases:

1. integration of the ingredients (kneading),
2. division of the dough,
3. rounding,
4. first resting,
5. molding,
6. second resting and
7. baking.

This bread is baked just enough so that it is not raw. A short baking time ensures that the crumb will be moist and fluffy. In fact, instead of allowing the freshly baked molletes to cool to room temperature, some bakers prefer to subject them to a sudden drop in temperature until they are frozen (using a blast chiller), thus preventing the crumb from continuing to bake.

== Characteristics ==
It is considered a panecillo because of its small size. It is also considered a bun because it is a tender loaf. It is quite flat and has a round or oblong form, slightly irregular. Its crust is soft, floured, cream-colored and not at all crunchy. As for the crumb, it is tight, very spongy and moist, with a tiny and regular pores.

== Culture ==
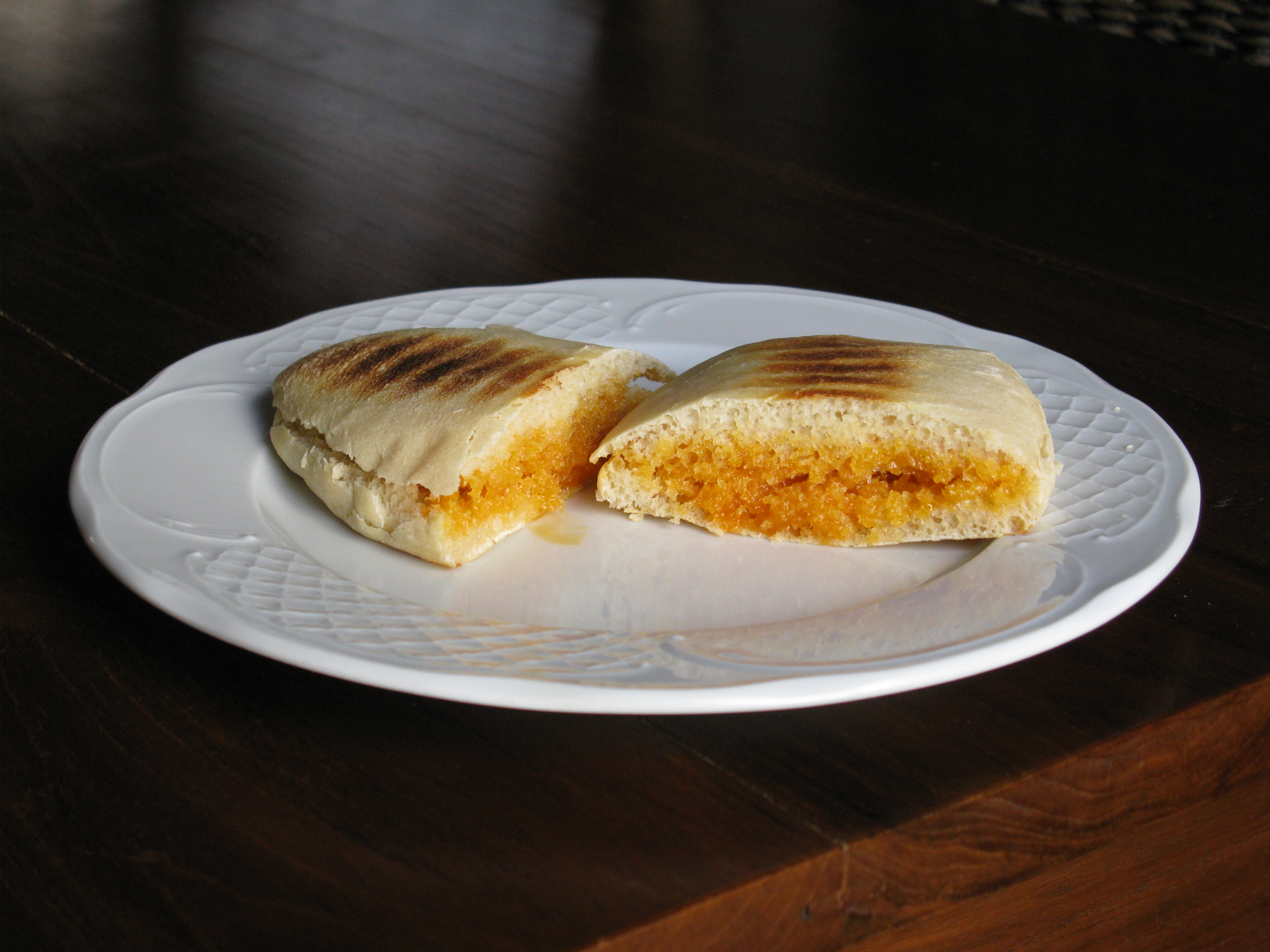
Mollete covered with manteca colorá.

The mollete is a symbol of Antequera's identity. In the Cavalcade of Magi (January 5), thousands of molletes are thrown from the floats, as well as mantecados and candies. During the carnival in this town, the ceremony of the "burning of the sardine" (or 'burial of the sardine') is replaced by the "burning of the mollete".

As previously mentioned, the mollete de Antequera is the main food of the traditional Andalusian breakfast, and of other daily Antequera meals. One way of tasting it is by spreading it with manteca colorá, a savory pork lard, red in color due to the paprika. It is a versatile bread that combines with jams, cheese and honey, sausages, smoked meats, sardines, pâtés, etc. In the Atlas ilustrado del pan (2014), it is recommended to toast the mollete to obtain its maximum flavor, as it enhances its organoleptic properties, and adds: "gourmets disagree on whether this toasting should be done with the whole mollete or split in two halves".

== IGP certification ==
The process of obtaining this European certification was initiated under the impetus of the Antequera City Council, in 2004. An organization of bakery producers was created. Initially, the convocation brought together 18 local bakers, seven of which finally formed the Antequera Pro-Mollete Association. By 2019, only two companies were members of the association: Mollete San Roque and El Antequerano. The other bakeries, such as Padepan or La Molletería denounced through El País and other newspapers that they were being excluded from the association and the IGP seal.

== See also ==
- Bread in Spain
- List of Andalusian food and drink products with protected status
