= New Orleans Cold Storage =

- Type: Private
- Industry: Refrigerated Warehousing and Supply Chain Management
- Founded: New Orleans, Louisiana
- Headquarters: New Orleans, Louisiana
- Key people: Mark Blanchard, President & CEO
- Services: Refrigerated Warehousing and Supply Chain Logistics
- Number of employees: 2,200 Stevedores, 250 Support and Executive Staff
- Website: www.nocs.com

New Orleans Cold Storage and Warehouse Co. is an American company providing refrigerated warehousing in the US port cities of New Orleans, Houston and Charleston. Facilities include refrigerated storage and blast freezing, and they maintain USDA and foreign export certifications for meat and poultry.

== History ==
Established in 1886, New Orleans Cold Storage and Warehouse Co. (NOCS) is said to be the oldest cold storage company in North America.

== Operating units ==
NOCS currently has four facilities with over 15,000,000 cubic feet of refrigerated space located in three strategic port cities: New Orleans, LA; Houston, TX; and Charleston, SC.

=== Port of New Orleans ===
There are currently two locations in New Orleans: one at Jourdan Road and one at the Henry Clay Avenue Wharf.

==== Jourdan Road ====
NOCS Jourdan Facility

The Jourdan Road warehouse was built in 2003 and has 160,000 square feet (4,500,000 cubic feet) of refrigerated cold storage warehouse with a total storage capacity of 46,000,000 lbs of product. It features 24 truck bays and three vessel berths and maintains USDA export certification, approval from the Russian confederation for poultry exports, and approval for poultry and beef exports to Mexico. It is especially designed to blast freeze meat and poultry to 0 degrees Fahrenheit within 24 hours with a total capacity of 1,200,000 lbs a day.

==== Henry Clay ====
The facility at Henry Clay, also in New Orleans, was constructed in 2012 with 127,000 square feet (5,100,000 cubic feet) of cold storage warehouse with a total storage capacity of 38,000,000 pounds of product. This plant has riverfront bulk break access as well as direct access to the Port of New Orleans container port. This facility has two vessel berths and 20 dock doors and is located within one mile of the container terminal. This facility has access to all major U.S. rail carriers. It maintains USDA export certification and approval from the Russian confederation for poultry exports. It is especially designed to blast freeze meat and poultry at 0 degrees Fahrenheit within 24 hours with a total capacity of 1,240,000 lbs. a day.

=== Port of Houston ===
NOCS Houston Facility

The West Gulf warehouse was built in 1984 in La Porte, TX. At 140,000 square feet (13,000 m^{2}) and 4,200,000 cubic feet (120,000 m^{3}), this facility can blast freeze up to 1,280,000 lbs of meat and poultry a day. There are 32 truck platforms and the warehouse is accessible to all Class 1 railroads serving the Houston area. It also maintains certifications for Russian poultry shipments as well as Russian export and Russian pork Trichinosis certifications. It is a USDA approved meat inspection establishment and has the ability to do Trichinae testing.

=== Port of Charleston ===
NOCS Charleston Facility

The South Atlantic plant was built in 1987 in Charleston, SC. At 1,500,000 cubic feet (42,000 m^{3}), this facility can blast freeze up to 320,000 lbs of meat and poultry a day. There are 16 truck platforms and the warehouse is accessible to all railroads that serve Charleston, SC (Norfolk Southern and CSX directly). This facility is certified for Russian meat and poultry shipments.

== See also ==
- Warehouse
- Distribution (business)
- Logistics
- Food
- Refrigeration
- Supply Chain
