= Bolillo =

Small baguette-like bread from Mexico

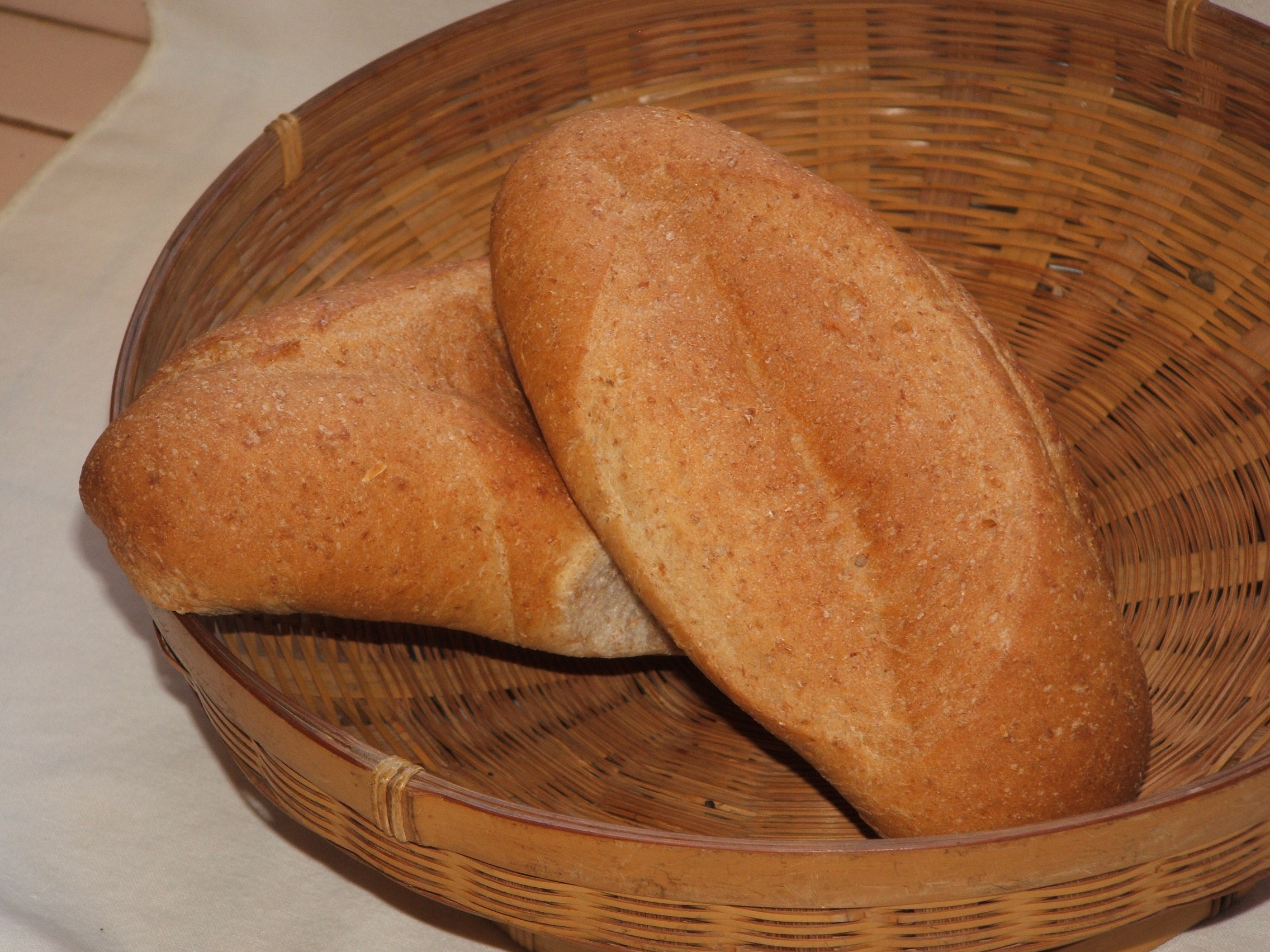
- Alternative names: Pan francés (El Salvador)
- Type: French roll
- Place of origin: Mexico
- Region or state: Americas

A bolillo (Spanish pronunciation: [boˈliʝo] in Mexico) or pan francés (in Central America, meaning "French bread") is a type of savory bread made in Mexico and Central America. It is a variation of the baguette, but shorter in length, and is often baked in a stone oven. Brought to Mexico City in the 1860s by Emperor Maximilian's troupe of cooks, its use quickly spread throughout the country.

It is roughly 15 centimeters (5.9 in) long, in the shape of an ovoid (similar to an American football), with a crunchy crust and a soft inside known as migajón (Spanish pronunciation: [miɣaˈxon], literally "big crumb"). It is the main ingredient for tortas and molletes. It has a slash on top made with a slashing tool or bread lame, which permits the exhaust of steam and the expansion of bread without stressing its skin. Other variations include bolillos made of alternate ingredients such as whole wheat, wheat germ, or flax.

== Uses ==
The bolillo is the typical bun used for Sonoran hot dogs.

== See also ==
- French roll
