= Mollete (bread) =

Flatbread from Andalusia, Spain

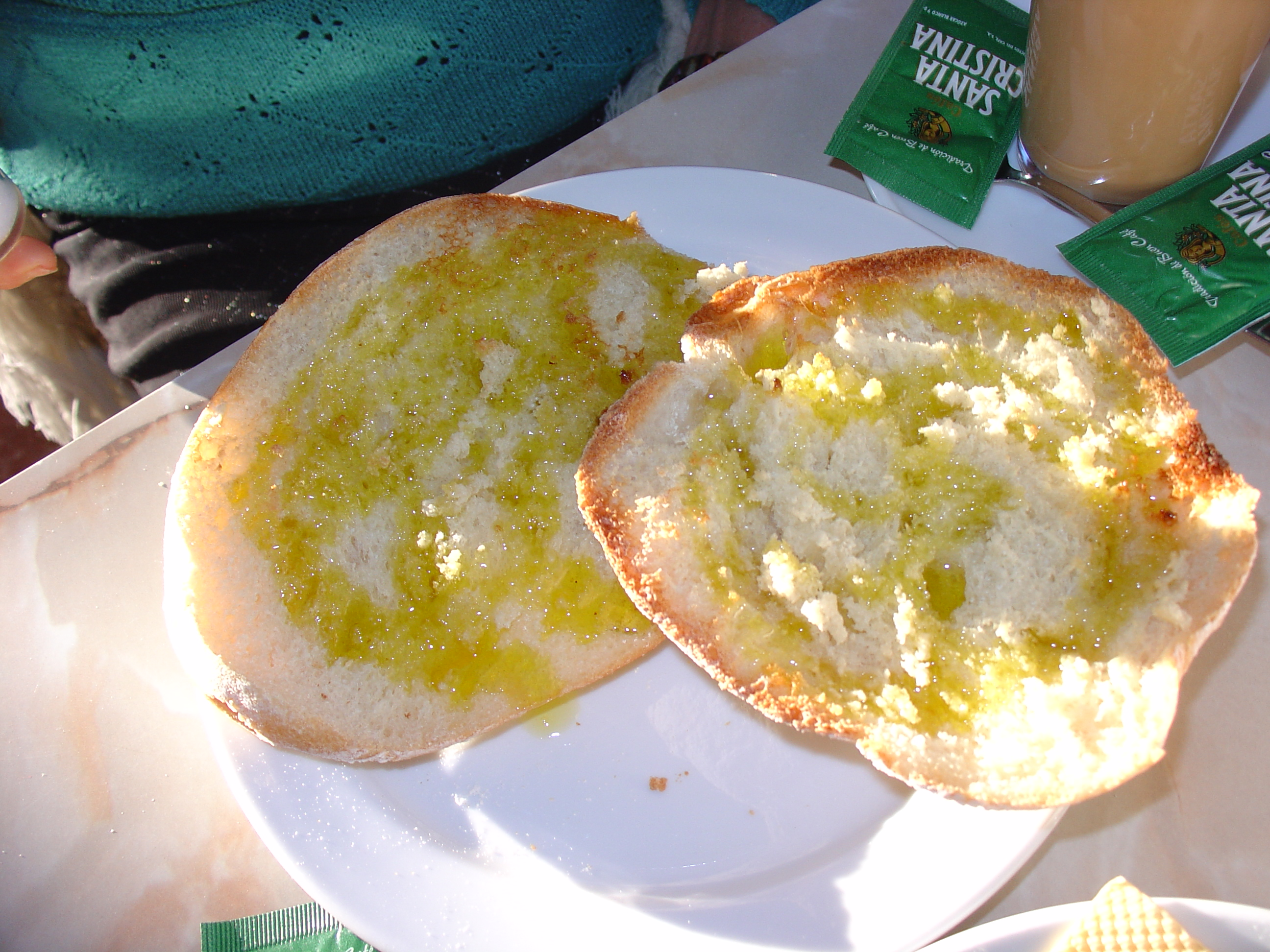
- Type: Bread
- Place of origin: Spain

A mollete, from muelle ("soft") + -ete (diminutive), is a flatbread from the Andalusian region, in southern Spain. It is a soft round white bread, usually served lightly toasted with olive oil and raw garlic or spread with lard (usually in the forms of manteca colorá or zurrapa de lomo) in an Andalusian breakfast. The most famous are the ones from Antequera, Málaga.

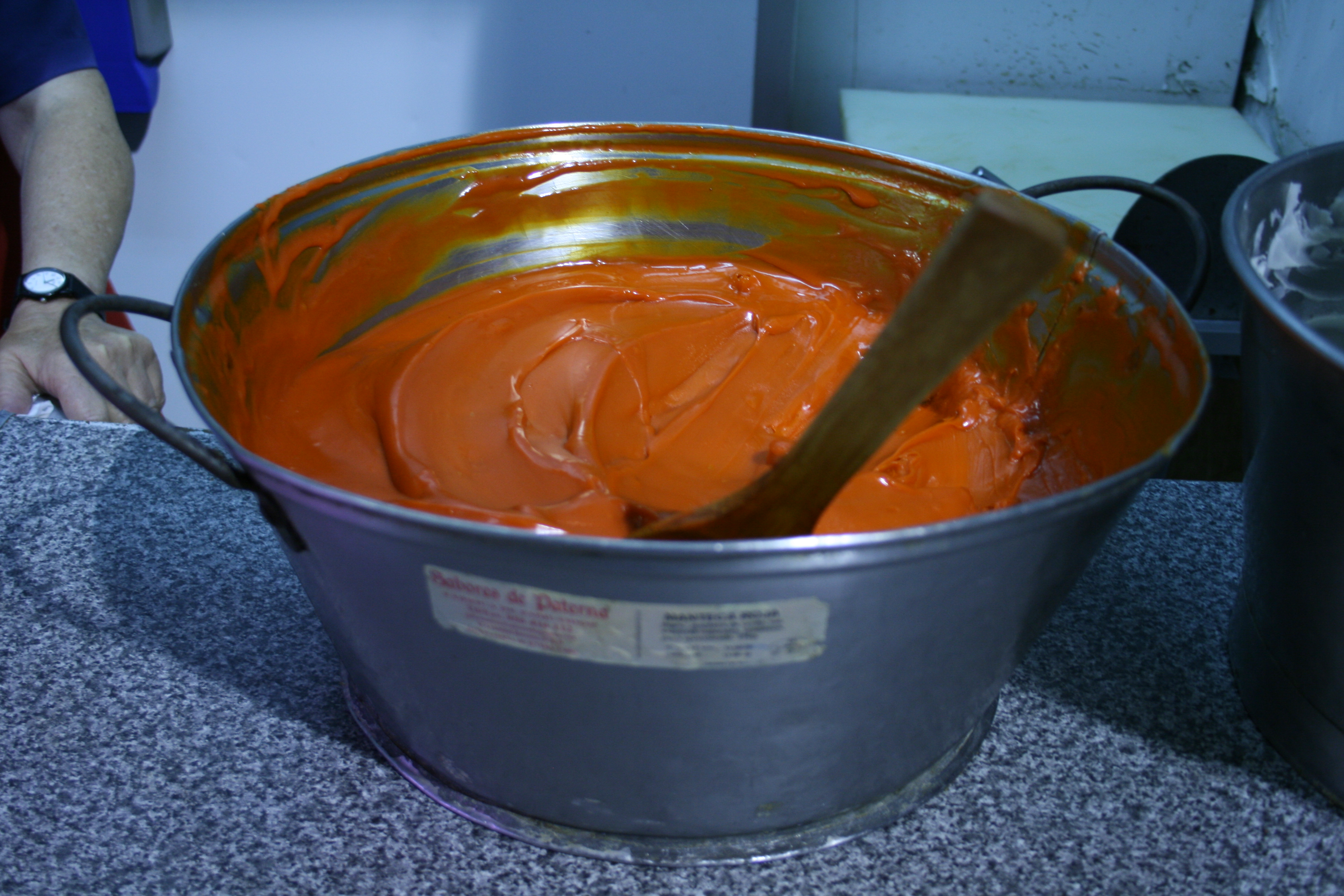
Manteca colorá (English: red lard), lard cooked with pork and paprika and often spread on toasted molletes.

It should not be confused with the Mexican dish of the same name.

== See also ==
- Mollete de Antequera
