= Fruit production and deforestation =

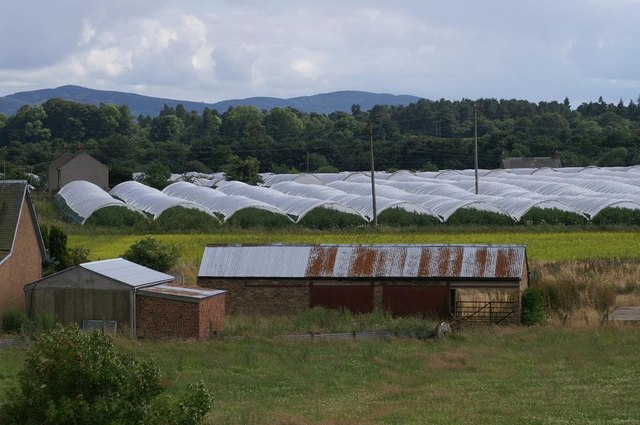
Fruit Production Company

Fruit production is a major driver of deforestation around the world. In tropical countries, forests are often cleared to plant fruit trees, such as bananas, pineapples, and mangos. This deforestation is having a number of negative environmental impacts, including biodiversity loss, ecosystem disruption, and land degradation.

== Background ==
The deforestation of tropical forests for fruit production has a number of negative environmental impacts. First, it is leading to the loss of biodiversity. Tropical forests are home to a wide variety of plant and animal species, many of which are found nowhere else in the world. When forests are cleared, these species are often displaced or killed.

Second, the deforestation of tropical forests is disrupting ecosystems. Forests play a vital role in regulating the environment. They help to absorb rainwater, prevent flooding, and mitigate climate change. When forests are cleared, these important ecosystem services are disrupted.

Third, the deforestation of tropical forests is leading to land degradation. When forests are cleared, the soil is often left exposed to erosion. This can lead to land degradation, which can make it difficult to grow crops.

The deforestation of tropical forests for fruit production is a serious problem with a number of negative environmental impacts. It is important to find ways to produce fruits without further destroying forests. Some possible solutions include:

Promoting sustainable fruit production practices: Sustainable fruit production practices can help to reduce the environmental impact of fruit production. These practices include using shade-tolerant crops, planting trees on farms, and using integrated pest management. Conserving forests: It is important to conserve forests so that they can continue to provide important ecosystem services. This can be done by creating protected areas, enforcing laws against illegal logging, and supporting sustainable forest management practices. Changing consumer behavior: Consumers can play a role in reducing the demand for fruits that are produced at the expense of forests. They can do this by choosing fruits that are produced in a sustainable way and by supporting organizations that are working to conserve forests.

== Fruit production ==
Fruit production: Fruit production is a major driver of deforestation around the world. In tropical countries, forests are often cleared to plant fruit trees, such as bananas, pineapples, and mangoes. This deforestation is having a number of negative environmental impacts, including:

Biodiversity loss: Forests are home to a wide variety of plant and animal species, many of which are found nowhere else in the world. Deforestation is threatening these species with extinction.

Ecosystem disruption: Forests play a vital role in regulating the environment. They help to absorb rainwater, prevent flooding, and mitigate climate change. Deforestation can disrupt these important ecosystem services.

Land degradation: When forests are cleared, the soil is often left exposed to erosion. This can lead to land degradation, which can make it difficult to grow crops.

== Deforestation ==
Deforestation is the clearing of forests to make way for other land uses, such as agriculture, logging, and mining. It is a major problem around the world, and it is having a number of negative environmental impacts.

Agricultural expansion: Agricultural expansion is the process of increasing the amount of land that is used for agriculture. This can be done by clearing forests, converting grasslands to cropland, or draining wetlands. Agricultural expansion is often driven by the need to produce more food to meet the demands of a growing population. Agricultural expansion can have a number of negative environmental impacts, including:

- Deforestation: When forests are cleared for agriculture, it releases carbon dioxide into the atmosphere, contributes to climate change, and destroys wildlife habitat.
- Habitat loss: Agricultural expansion can lead to the loss of habitat for plants and animals. This can have a negative impact on biodiversity.
- Water pollution: Agricultural runoff can pollute rivers and lakes with fertilizers and pesticides. This can harm aquatic life and make water unsafe for drinking and swimming.
- Soil erosion: When land is cleared for agriculture, it can be easily eroded by wind and water. This can lead to the loss of topsoil and the degradation of land.
- Desertification: Agricultural expansion can contribute to desertification, which is the process of land becoming dry and barren. This can be caused by a number of factors, including climate change, overgrazing, and deforestation. Agricultural expansion can also have a number of social impacts, including:
- Land conflicts: Agricultural expansion can lead to conflicts between farmers and other land users, such as indigenous peoples and conservationists.
- Displacement of people: Agricultural expansion can displace people from their homes and land. This can have a negative impact on their livelihoods and well-being.
- Increasing inequality: Agricultural expansion can lead to increasing inequality, as those who own land benefit from the expansion, while those who do not own land may be displaced or lose access to natural resources. There are a number of ways to mitigate the negative environmental impacts of agricultural expansion, including:
- Conservation agriculture: Conservation agriculture is a set of farming practices that help to protect the environment. These practices include crop rotation, cover cropping, and minimum tillage.
- Reforestation: Reforestation is the process of planting trees on land that has been cleared for agriculture. This helps to absorb carbon dioxide from the atmosphere and to restore wildlife habitat.
- Integrated pest management: Integrated pest management is a system of pest control that uses a variety of methods, such as crop rotation, biological control, and natural enemies, to reduce the need for pesticides.
- Water conservation: Water conservation is the practice of using less water in agriculture. This can be done by using drip irrigation, planting drought-tolerant crops, and mulching.
- Sustainable land use: Sustainable land use is the practice of using land in a way that meets the needs of the present without compromising the ability of future generations to meet their own needs. This can be done by using practices that protect the environment, such as conservation agriculture and reforestation. Agricultural expansion is a complex issue with a number of environmental and social impacts. By taking steps to mitigate the negative impacts of agricultural expansion, we can help ensure a more sustainable future for food production.

Logging: Logging is another major driver of deforestation. Logging is the process of cutting down trees for timber or other purposes. It is a major industry in many parts of the world, and it is essential for providing wood for construction, furniture, and other products. There are two main types of logging:

- Clear-cutting: This is the practice of cutting down all of the trees in an area. Clear-cutting is often used to create large areas of land for agriculture or development.
- Selective cutting: This is the practice of cutting down only certain trees, such as those that are mature or diseased. Selective cutting is often used to manage forests and protect wildlife habitat.

Logging can have a number of environmental impacts, including:

- Deforestation: When forests are logged, it can lead to deforestation, which is the loss of forest cover. Deforestation can have a number of negative impacts, such as climate change, soil erosion, and habitat loss.
- Water pollution: Logging can also lead to water pollution, as runoff from logging sites can carry sediment and pollutants into streams and rivers. This can harm aquatic life and make water unsafe for drinking and swimming.
- Air pollution: Logging can also contribute to air pollution, as the burning of trees releases smoke and other pollutants into the air. This can harm human health and contribute to climate change.
- Habitat loss: Logging can lead to the loss of habitat for plants and animals. This can have a negative impact on biodiversity.
- Soil erosion: Logging can also lead to soil erosion, as the removal of trees can make the soil more vulnerable to wind and water. This can lead to the loss of topsoil and the degradation of land.

Logging can also have a number of social impacts, including:

- Land conflicts: Logging can lead to conflicts between loggers and other land users, such as indigenous peoples and conservationists.
- Displacement of people: Logging can displace people from their homes and land. This can have a negative impact on their livelihoods and well-being.
- Increasing inequality: Logging can lead to increasing inequality, as those who own land benefit from the logging, while those who do not own land may be displaced or lose access to natural resources.

There are a number of ways to mitigate the negative environmental impacts of logging, including:

- Sustainable forest management: Sustainable forest management is the practice of managing forests in a way that meets the needs of the present without compromising the ability of future generations to meet their own needs. This can be done by using practices that protect the environment, such as selective cutting and replanting trees.
- Reforestation: Reforestation is the process of planting trees on land that has been logged. This helps to absorb carbon dioxide from the atmosphere and to restore wildlife habitat.
- Water conservation: Water conservation is the practice of using less water in logging operations. This can be done by using drip irrigation and by mulching.
- Efficient machinery: Using efficient machinery can help to reduce the amount of damage caused by logging operations.
- Public education: Public education can help raise awareness of the environmental impacts of logging and to encourage sustainable forest management practices. Logging is a complex issue with a number of environmental and social impacts. By taking steps to mitigate the negative impacts of logging, we can help to ensure a more sustainable future for forest management.

Mining: Mining can also lead to deforestation, as trees are cleared to access mineral resources. Mining is the process of extracting minerals from the Earth's crust. It is a major industry in many parts of the world, and it is essential for providing raw materials for a variety of products, such as metals, minerals, and fuels.

There are many different types of mining, but some of the most common include:

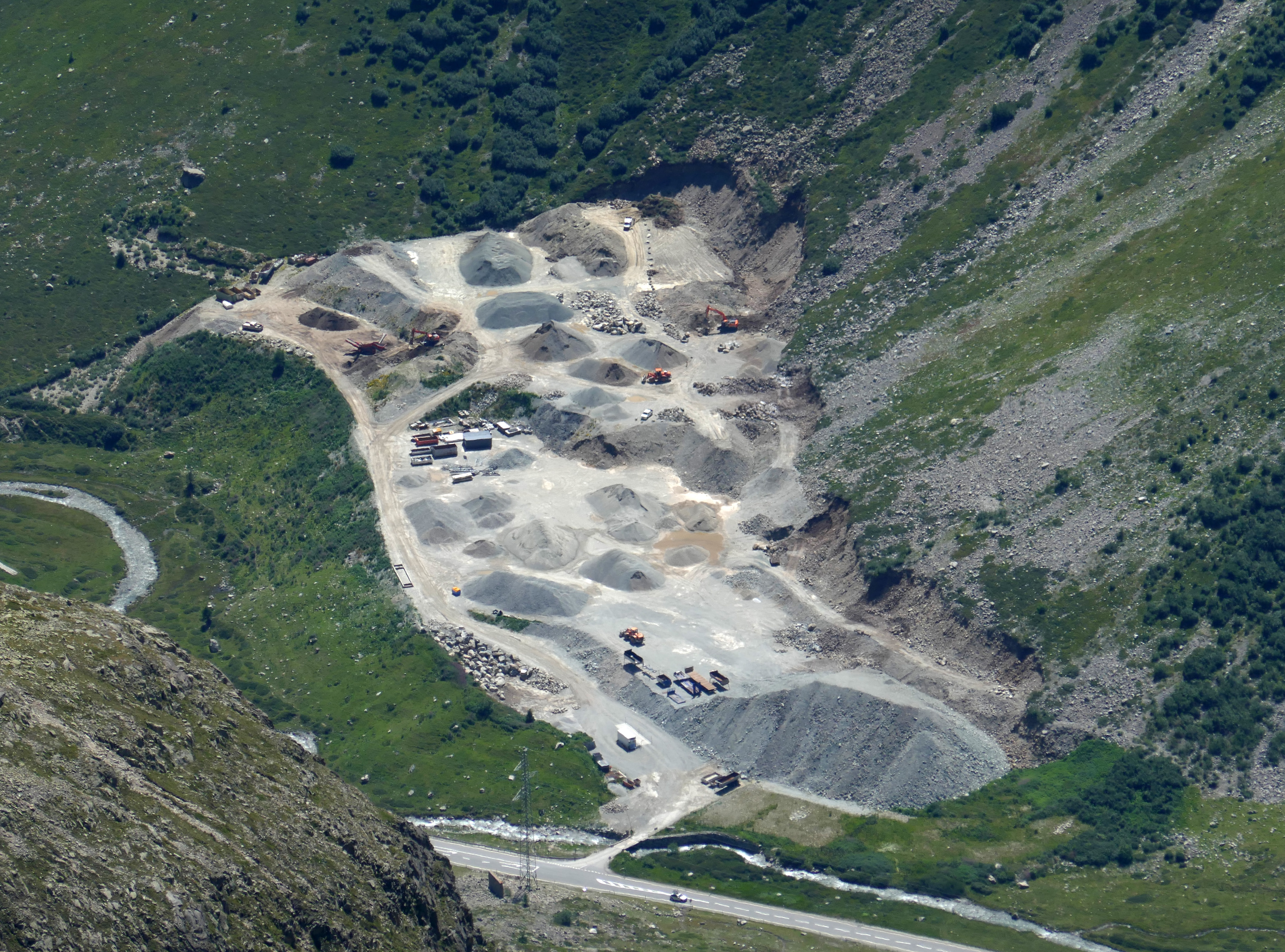
- Surface mining
  Surface mining: This is the process of extracting minerals from the Earth's surface. It is often used for coal, sand, and gravel.
- Underground mining: This is the process of extracting minerals from below the Earth's surface. It is often used for metals, such as copper and gold. Opens in a new windowwww.srk.com Underground mining
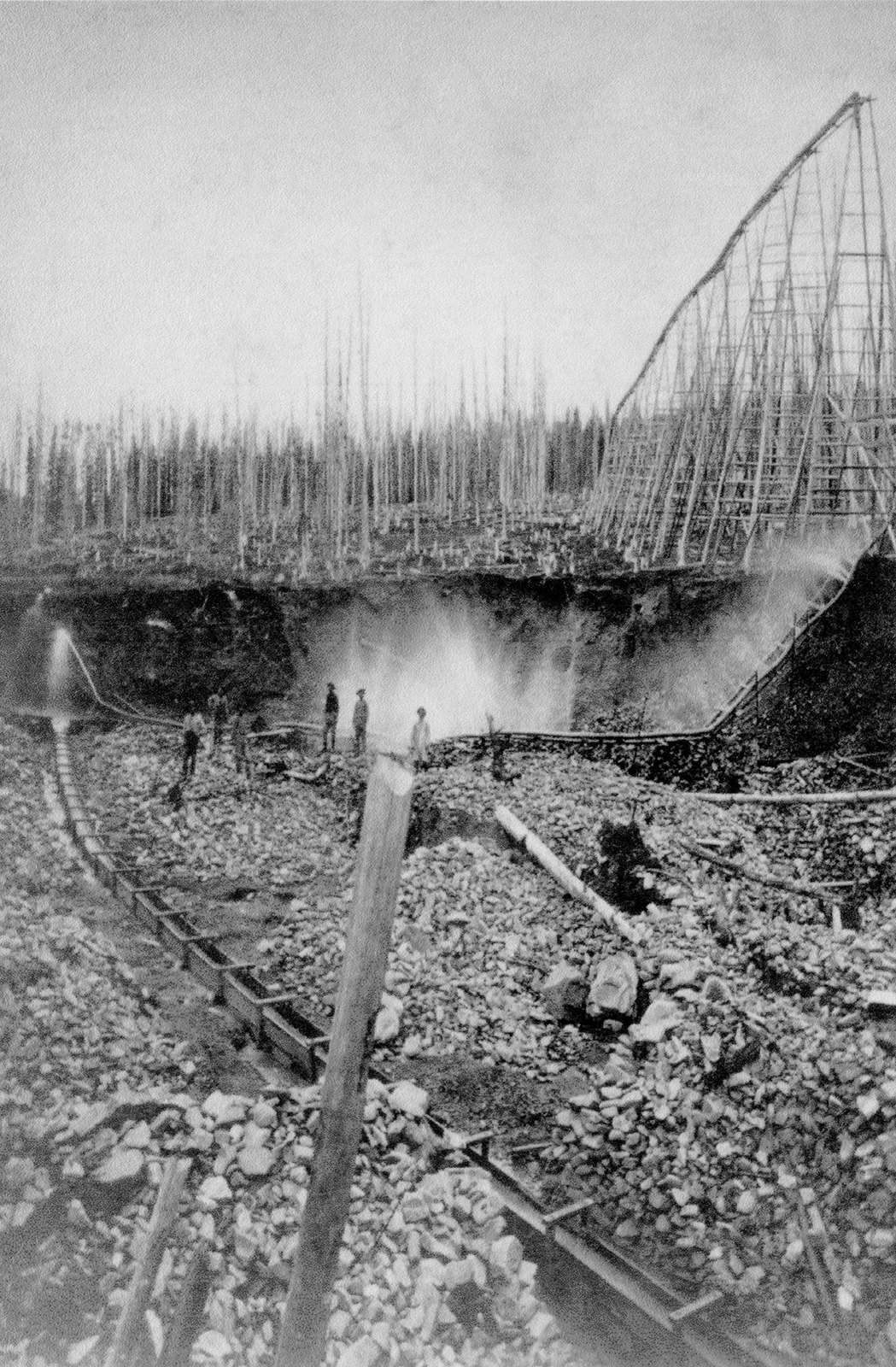
- Placer mining
  Placer mining: This is the process of extracting minerals that have been deposited by rivers or streams. It is often used for gold and diamonds.
- Offshore mining: This is the process of extracting minerals from the seabed. It is often used for oil and gas.

Mining can have a number of environmental impacts, including:

- Deforestation: Mining can lead to deforestation, as trees are often cleared to access mineral deposits. This can have a number of negative impacts, such as climate change, soil erosion, and habitat loss.
- Water pollution: Mining can also lead to water pollution, as runoff from mining sites can carry sediment and pollutants into streams and rivers. This can harm aquatic life and make water unsafe for drinking and swimming.
- Air pollution: Mining can also contribute to air pollution, as the burning of fuel and the use of explosives can release smoke and other pollutants into the air. This can harm human health and contribute to climate change.
- Habitat loss: Mining can lead to the loss of habitat for plants and animals. This can have a negative impact on biodiversity.
- Soil erosion: Mining can also lead to soil erosion, as the removal of vegetation can make the soil more vulnerable to wind and water. This can lead to the loss of topsoil and the degradation of land.

Mining can also have a number of social impacts, including:

- Land conflicts: Mining can lead to conflicts between miners and other land users, such as indigenous peoples and conservationists.
- Displacement of people: Mining can displace people from their homes and land. This can have a negative impact on their livelihoods and well-being.
- Increasing inequality: Mining can lead to increasing inequality, as those who own land benefit from the mining, while those who do not own land may be displaced or lose access to natural resources.

There are a number of ways to mitigate the negative environmental impacts of mining, including:

- Reclamation: Reclamation is the process of restoring land that has been mined. This can be done by replanting trees, restoring water quality, and creating wildlife habitat.
- Wastewater treatment: Wastewater treatment can help to reduce the amount of pollutants that are released from mining operations.
- Efficient machinery: Using efficient machinery can help to reduce the amount of damage caused by mining operations.
- Public education: Public education can help to raise awareness of the environmental impacts of mining and to encourage sustainable mining practices.

Mining is a complex issue with a number of environmental and social impacts. By taking steps to mitigate the negative impacts of mining, we can help to ensure a more sustainable future for mineral extraction.

This deforestation is disrupting ecosystems and contributing to climate change.

== Land conversion ==
Land conversion is the change in the primary use of land from one type to another. For example, agricultural land may be converted to urban land, or forest land may be converted to pasture land. Land conversion can have a significant impact on the environment, the economy, and society.

There are many different types of land conversion, but some of the most common include:

- Deforestation: This is the clearing of forests for agricultural, urban, or industrial development. Deforestation can have a number of negative environmental impacts, including soil erosion, flooding, and climate change.
- Urbanization: This is the growth of cities and towns. Urbanization can lead to the conversion of agricultural land, forests, and wetlands to urban uses. This can have a number of negative environmental impacts, including air pollution, water pollution, and loss of biodiversity.
- Intensive agriculture: This is the practice of using large amounts of inputs, such as fertilizers and pesticides, to produce high yields of crops. Intensive agriculture can lead to the degradation of soil and water resources, and the loss of biodiversity.
- Mining: This is the extraction of minerals from the ground. Mining can lead to the destruction of forests, wetlands, and other habitats. It can also pollute water resources and the air.

Land conversion can have a number of negative environmental impacts, including:

- Soil erosion: This is the removal of topsoil by wind or water. Soil erosion can lead to flooding, water pollution, and the loss of agricultural productivity.
- Water pollution: This is the contamination of water by human activities. Water pollution can lead to the death of fish and other aquatic organisms, and the spread of disease.
- Loss of biodiversity: This is the decline in the number and variety of plant and animal species. Loss of biodiversity can have a number of negative impacts, including the disruption of food chains and the loss of ecosystem services.

Land conversion can also have a number of negative economic impacts, including:

- Decreased agricultural productivity: This can lead to higher food prices and food insecurity.
- Increased unemployment: This can occur when people are displaced from their land due to land conversion.
- Loss of tourism revenue: This can occur when land conversion destroys natural attractions.

Land conversion can also have a number of negative social impacts, including:

- Conflicts between different groups: This can occur when different groups have different interests in the land, such as farmers, developers, and conservationists.
- Displacement of people: This can occur when people are forced to leave their land due to land conversion.
- Loss of cultural heritage: This can occur when land conversion destroys archaeological sites and other cultural landmarks.

Land conversion is a complex issue with a wide range of environmental, economic, and social impacts. It is important to weigh the benefits and costs of land conversion carefully before making a decision about whether or not to proceed.

Here are some ways to mitigate the negative impacts of land conversion:

- Planning: Careful planning can help minimize the negative impacts of land conversion. This includes identifying the potential impacts of land conversion, and developing strategies to mitigate those impacts.
- Rehabilitation: Land that has been converted can be rehabilitated to restore its environmental functions. This can involve planting trees, restoring wetlands, and reintroducing native species.
- Sustainable land use: Sustainable land use practices can help to reduce the need for land conversion. This includes practices such as crop rotation, conservation tillage, and integrated pest management.

By taking these steps, we can help minimize the negative impacts of land conversion and protect our natural resources.

== Sustainable farming ==
Sustainable farming is the practice of producing food and other agricultural products in a way that does not deplete natural resources or harm the environment. It is a way of farming that meets the needs of the present without compromising the ability of future generations to meet their own needs.

Sustainable farming practices include:

- Crop rotation: This is the practice of planting different crops in the same field each year. This helps to maintain soil fertility and prevent pests and diseases.
- Conservation tillage: This is the practice of minimizing soil disturbance during cultivation. This helps to reduce soil erosion and improve water infiltration.
- Integrated pest management: This is a system of pest control that uses a variety of methods, such as crop rotation, biological control, and natural enemies, to reduce the need for pesticides.
- Water conservation: This is the practice of using water efficiently in agriculture. This can be done by using drip irrigation, planting drought-tolerant crops, and mulching.
- Regenerative agriculture: This is a system of farming that aims to improve soil health and biodiversity. It includes practices such as cover cropping, composting, and livestock grazing.

Sustainable farming can provide a number of benefits, including:

- Improved soil health: Sustainable farming practices can help to improve soil health by increasing organic matter content, improving water infiltration, and reducing erosion.
- Reduced pollution: Sustainable farming practices can help to reduce pollution by reducing the use of pesticides and fertilizers, and by improving water quality.
- Increased biodiversity: Sustainable farming practices can help to increase biodiversity by providing habitat for wildlife and pollinators.
- Improved climate resilience: Sustainable farming practices can help to improve climate resilience by reducing greenhouse gas emissions and increasing carbon sequestration.
- Economic viability: Sustainable farming can be economically viable for farmers. There are a number of government programs and private businesses that provide financial support for sustainable farming practices.

Sustainable farming is an important way to meet the challenges of the 21st century, such as climate change, food security, and environmental degradation. By adopting sustainable farming practices, farmers can help protect our natural resources and ensure a sustainable future for food production.

Here are some of the challenges of sustainable farming:

- Cost: Sustainable farming practices can be more expensive than conventional farming practices. This is because they often require more labor and time.
- Acceptance: There is still a lack of acceptance of sustainable farming practices among some farmers. This is due to a number of factors, such as the perception that these practices are not as productive as conventional farming practices.
- Regulation: There is a lack of government regulation to support sustainable farming practices. This makes it difficult for farmers to adopt these practices.

Despite these challenges, there is a growing movement towards sustainable farming. There are a number of organizations that are working to promote sustainable farming practices and to provide support to farmers who are adopting these practices. With continued effort, sustainable farming can become the norm in the future.

== Food security ==
Food security is defined as "access by all people at all times to enough safe and nutritious food for an active and healthy life." It is a multidimensional concept that includes the availability of food, access to food, utilization of food, and stability of food supply.

- Availability of food: This refers to the quantity of food that is produced or available for import. It is influenced by factors such as agricultural production, climate change, and trade policies.
- Access to food: This refers to the ability of people to obtain food, either through their own production or through purchase. It is influenced by factors such as income, prices, and access to markets.
- Utilization of food: This refers to the ability of people to use the food they consume to meet their nutritional needs. It is influenced by factors such as food preparation, cooking practices, and health status.
- Stability of food supply: This refers to the ability to maintain a consistent food supply over time, even in the face of shocks and stresses such as climate change, conflict, and economic instability.

Food insecurity can occur at the individual, household, national, or global level. It can be caused by a number of factors, including:

- Natural disasters: such as droughts, floods, and pests can damage crops and livestock, leading to food shortages.
- Conflict: War and civil unrest can disrupt food production and distribution, leading to food insecurity.
- Economic instability: High food prices, unemployment, and poverty can make it difficult for people to afford food.
- Climate change: Climate change is expected to lead to more extreme weather events, such as droughts and floods, which could disrupt food production and distribution.
- Population growth: The world's population is expected to grow by 2 billion people by 2050, which will put a strain on the global food supply.

Food insecurity can have a number of negative consequences, including:

- Malnutrition: People who are food insecure are more likely to be malnourished, which can lead to health problems such as stunting, wasting, and micronutrient deficiencies.
- Poverty: Food insecurity can contribute to poverty, as people who are unable to afford food may be forced to spend less on other necessities, such as housing and healthcare.
- Instability: Food insecurity can lead to social unrest and instability, as people may resort to violence or protests in order to obtain food.

There are a number of things that can be done to improve food security, including:

- Investing in agriculture: This includes providing farmers with access to land, water, and technology, as well as supporting research and development of new crops and agricultural practices.
- Improving access to food: This includes providing food assistance to the poor and vulnerable, and promoting policies that make food more affordable.
- Addressing the root causes of food insecurity: This includes addressing climate change, conflict, and economic instability.
- Promoting sustainable agriculture: This includes practices that protect the environment and natural resources, such as crop rotation, conservation tillage, and integrated pest management.

Food security affects human well-being worldwide and is linked to broader social and environmental sustainability issues.

== Carbon emissions ==
Carbon emissions are the release of carbon dioxide and other carbon-containing gases into the atmosphere. These gases trap heat, which contributes to climate change.

The main sources of carbon emissions are:

- Fossil fuel combustion: This is the burning of coal, oil, and natural gas for electricity, heat, and transportation.
- Deforestation: When trees are cut down, the carbon they store is released into the atmosphere.
- Agriculture: This includes the production of food, feed, and fiber. Livestock production is a major source of methane, a greenhouse gas that is more potent than carbon dioxide.
- Industrial processes: This includes the production of cement, steel, and other products.
- Waste management: This includes the disposal of garbage and sewage.

Carbon emissions have a number of negative impacts on the environment, including:

- Climate change: Carbon dioxide is the main greenhouse gas that traps heat in the atmosphere. As carbon emissions increase, the Earth's temperature is rising, which is causing a number of problems, such as more extreme weather events, rising sea levels, and melting glaciers.
- Ocean acidification: Carbon dioxide dissolves in water and forms carbonic acid, which makes the ocean more acidic. This is harmful to marine life, as it can damage their shells and skeletons.
- Air pollution: Carbon emissions contribute to air pollution, which can cause respiratory problems and other health problems.
- Water pollution: Carbon emissions can also pollute water, making it unsafe to drink and swim in.

There are a number of things that can be done to reduce carbon emissions, including:

- Shifting to renewable energy: This includes using solar, wind, and other renewable sources of energy to generate electricity.
- Improving energy efficiency: This means using less energy to power our homes, businesses, and transportation systems.
- Reducing deforestation: This can be done by planting trees and protecting existing forests.
- Changing agricultural practices: This includes reducing the use of fertilizer and manure, which release methane into the atmosphere.
- Improving waste management: This includes recycling and composting, which can help to reduce the amount of waste that ends up in landfills.

Reducing carbon emissions is widely considered to be essential for addressing climate change. By taking action to reduce our emissions, we can help to create a more sustainable future for ourselves and generations to come.

Carbon emissions are a major contributor to climate change. Deforestation is a major source of carbon emissions, as trees absorb carbon dioxide from the atmosphere. When forests are cleared, this carbon dioxide is released into the atmosphere, contributing to climate change. Ecosystem services: Ecosystem services are the benefits that humans derive from ecosystems. They include things like clean air and water, food, and climate regulation. Deforestation can disrupt ecosystem services, making it more difficult for humans to meet their needs.

== Conservation ==
Conservation is the protection of natural resources and the environment. It is a broad term that encompasses a wide range of activities, from protecting endangered species to reducing pollution.

There are many different reasons why conservation is important. Some of the most important reasons include:

- To protect biodiversity: Biodiversity is the variety of life on Earth. It includes the variety of plants, animals, and microorganisms, as well as the variety of ecosystems. Biodiversity is essential for the health of the planet, as it provides us with food, clean air and water, and other essential services.
- To prevent extinction: Extinction is the permanent loss of a species. It is a natural process, but it is happening at an alarming rate today due to human activities. Conservation is essential to prevent extinction and to protect the plants and animals that are still alive.
- To reduce pollution: Pollution is the contamination of the environment by harmful substances. It can come from a variety of sources, such as factories, cars, and farms. Pollution can harm human health, wildlife, and ecosystems. Conservation can help to reduce pollution by reducing our reliance on harmful substances and by finding more sustainable ways to produce and consume goods and services.
- To mitigate climate change: Climate change is the long-term change in the average weather patterns that have come to define Earth's local, regional and global climates. These changes have a broad range of observed effects that are synonymous with the term. Conservation can help to mitigate climate change by reducing our emissions of greenhouse gases and by protecting forests, which absorb carbon dioxide from the atmosphere.

There are many different ways to conserve natural resources and the environment. Some of the most common ways include:

- Reducing our consumption: One of the best ways to conserve natural resources is to reduce our consumption. This means buying less stuff, using less energy, and wasting less food.
- Recycling and composting: Recycling and composting are two great ways to reduce waste and conserve resources. Recycling helps to reduce the amount of waste that goes to landfills, while composting helps to reduce the amount of food waste that goes to landfills.
- Using renewable energy: Renewable energy is energy that comes from sources that are naturally replenished, such as solar, wind, and hydroelectric power. Using renewable energy helps to reduce our reliance on fossil fuels and to conserve natural resources.
- Protecting endangered species: Endangered species are plants and animals that are at risk of extinction. Conservation can help to protect endangered species by creating protected areas, reducing pollution, and educating the public about the importance of conservation.
- Sustainable development: Sustainable development is development that meets the needs of the present without compromising the ability of future generations to meet their own needs. Conservation is essential for sustainable development, as it helps to ensure that we use natural resources wisely and that we protect the environment for future generations.

Conservation is an important issue that affects everyone on Earth. By taking action to conserve natural resources and the environment, we can help to ensure a healthy and sustainable future for ourselves and generations to come.
