= Banana plantation =

Facility where bananas are grown

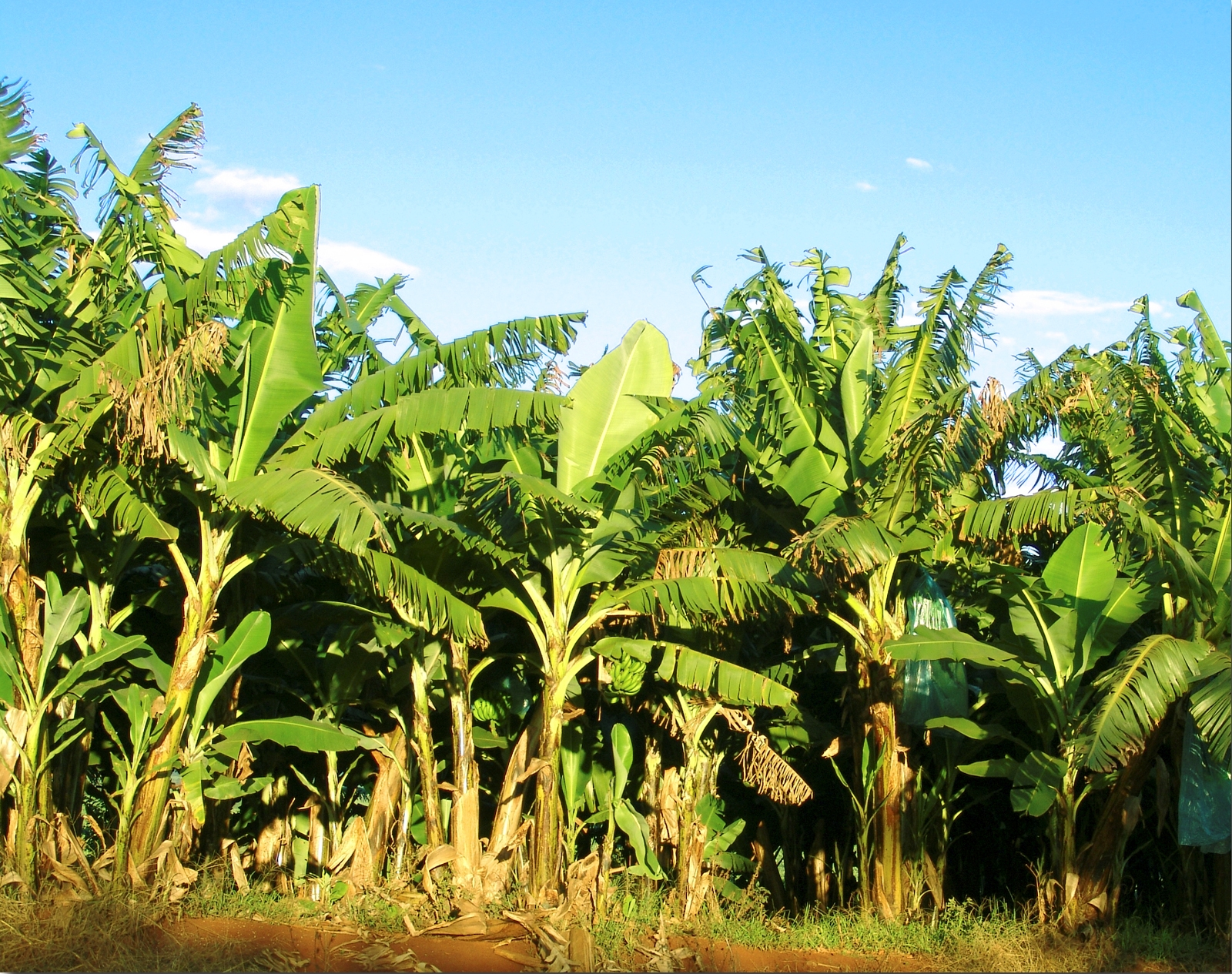
A banana plantation in Brazil

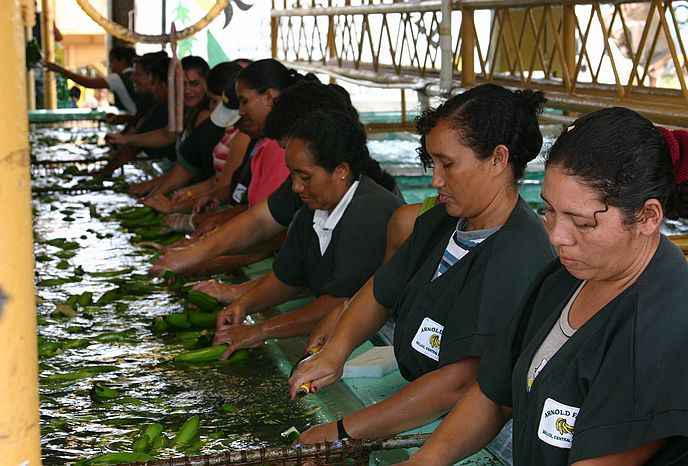
Women in Belize sorting bananas and cutting them from bunches

A banana plantation is a commercial agricultural facility found in tropical climates where bananas are grown.

== Geographic distribution ==
Banana plants may grow with varying degrees of success in diverse climatic conditions, but commercial banana plantations are primarily found in equatorial regions, in banana exporting countries. The four leading banana export countries worldwide are Ecuador, Costa Rica, Philippines, and Colombia. Ecuador provides more than 33% of global banana exports. In 2004, banana producing countries totaled 130. Production, as well as exports and imports of bananas, are nonetheless concentrated in a few equatorial countries. 75% of total banana production in 2004 was generated in 10 countries. India, Ecuador, Brazil and China produced half of total bananas. Latin American and Caribbean countries led banana production up to the 1980s, and Asian nations took the lead in banana production during the 1990s. African production levels have remained mostly unchanged.

== Elements ==
Banana plantations, as well as growing the fruit, may also package, process, and ship their product directly from the plantation to worldwide markets. Depending on the scope of the operation, a plantation's size may vary from a small family farm operation to a corporate facility encompassing large tracts of land, multiple physical plants, and many employees.

Production-related activities on a plantation may include cultivating and harvesting the fruit, transporting the picked bunches to a packing shed, hanging to ripen in large bunches, dividing large bunches into smaller market-friendly bunches, sorting, labeling, washing, drying, packing, boxing, storing, refrigeration, shipping, and marketing. Depending on the scope of the operation, other activities may include drying, food preparation, tourism, and market research.

=== Soil ===
Bananas will grow and fruit under poor soil conditions but will be less productive without deep, well-drained soil: forest loam, rocky sand, marl, red laterite, volcanic ash, sandy clay, or even heavy clay. The key element in soil type for successful banana plant growth is good drainage. Alluvial soils of river valleys are ideal for banana growing. Bananas prefer an acid soil.

=== Physical plant ===
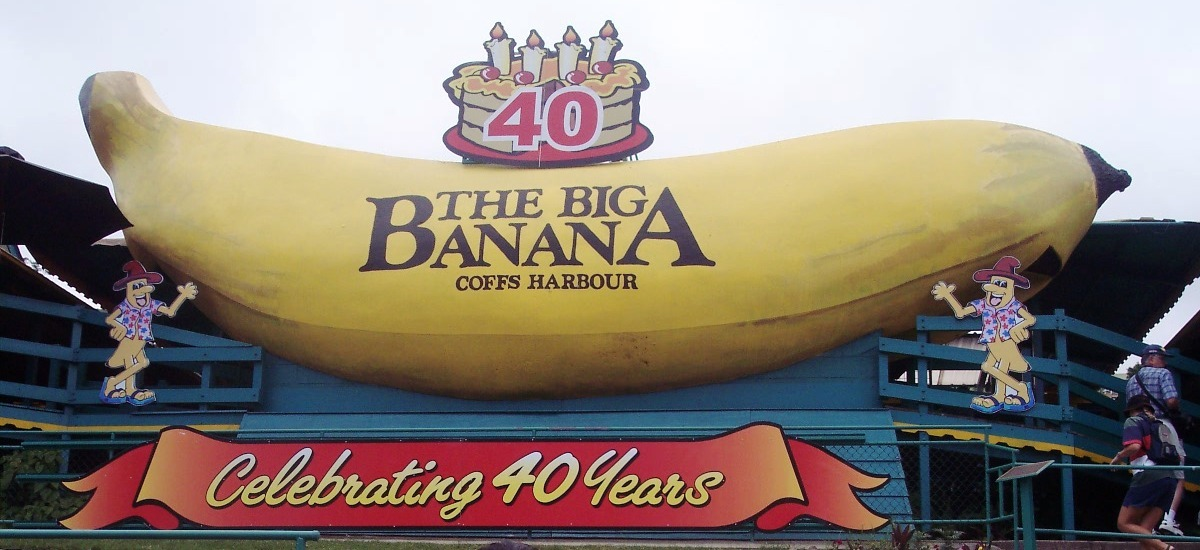
The Big Banana - A tourist facility on an Australian banana plantation

Physical plants on banana plantations, aside from growing fields, may include facilities or machinery for plant propagation, cultivation, labor housing, fertilization and pest mitigation, harvesting assists such as tractors or overhead cable systems, washing tanks, storage buildings, boxing or bagging, shipping docks, offices, public relations/tourism, and general maintenance.

Cultivation techniques specific to the type of banana produced may dictate the specific physical plant makeup. Much of banana cultivation since the mid-1950s has centered around a single monoculture: The Cavendish banana. The ravages of Panama Disease in that particular cultivar may cause a shift in variety selection, subsequently causing a major change in the physical plant structure of banana plantations.

== Economy ==
Banana growing is a significant economic engine in many banana-exporting countries because it is labor-intensive, delivers a relatively quick return on effort and investment, provides a weekly income year round, and the crop recovers quickly from hurricanes and other natural disasters. Banana industry exports worldwide total over 100 million tons in a market which generates over US$5 billion per year and employs millions of workers.

== Farming techniques ==
Banana plantations generally follow one of four major agricultural techniques: Intensive farming, sustainable farming, organic farming, and fair trade farming.

Intensive agricultural technique, which requires clearing almost all native vegetation from tracts of land, then densely planting and fertilizing the crop, may produce the highest yield of fruit per acre. However, it is viewed by environmental scientists as a technique which involves a history of high risk for damage to the local environment, and health risk to the agricultural workers.

=== Sustainable farming ===
As with broader sustainable agriculture, sustainable banana production aims to integrate three main goals: environmental stewardship, farm profitability, and prosperous farming communities. Producing goods without depleting an ecosystem's natural resources is a key goal of sustainable banana farming. The further goals of farm profitability and prosperous farming communities address free market viability issues which might threaten the viability of the business, rendering the ecological sustainability efforts moot. Because of the lower per-acre crop yield and higher wage cost intrinsic to this type of farming, profitability is addressed by the introduction of a price premium charged for the product at market. Such premiums are readily paid by a segment of the consumer market which places a value on the benefits of sustainable farming.

=== Organic farming ===
According to the United Nations, "no information is available regarding how many hectares are currently under conversion or how many producers are planning to convert to organic production methods." However major banana producers in 2008 indicated they were responding to demands for organic bananas with new facilities tailored to that market.

=== Fair Trade farming ===
Some consumers are willing to pay a premium price for a product, including bananas, if the means of production are consistent with the philosophies of Fair Trade. The United Nations has published a description of fair trade banana production which states, "for banana producers this means they obtain a price which covers the cost of production and an additional price premium to be invested in social, environmental or quality improvements."

=== Banana farming in flood prone areas ===
Sand deposition from flood makes soil unsuitable for growing other food crops due to very low nutrient availability, low water holding capacity and poor physical attributes. Thus more time and effort is required to completely restore the land into its original state after the sand deposition. As a result, farmers face difficulties to go back to normalcy and sustain their life. There are various strategies developed so far to revitalize flood degraded soil. However, most of the strategies require higher initial investment and/or take longer time to restore due to which farmers are unable to generate income as before.

==== Method of establishing banana orchard in flood deposited sandy soil ====
Banana can be grown in variety of soil. However, while planting in flood prone area and sand deposited soil, regular management practice should be slightly amended. If sand deposition is above 0.5 m and the area gets inundate for longer duration (more than 2–3 days) during monsoon, then such site should not be considered for banana plantation. These are the necessary things to be considered in each step of banana farming in flood affected area:

I. Variety selection

In flood affected areas, there is always a high chance of banana plant being submerged in flood during monsoon. If it is fully submerged for more than two days, plant can eventually die. Therefore tall variety plants with deep root system should be planted in such areas. In Nepal, people usually grow malbhog variety of banana in the areas which are prone to annual flood but are not inundate for longer than three days. Malbhog variety grows up to the height of 5 m and root goes down to more than 1 m deep into the soil. Production is quiet lower compared to hybrid varieties but fetch good market price because of its taste.

II. Propagation material

In Nepal, banana is propagated exclusively using suckers. Suckers are lateral shoot that develops from the rhizome near the mother plant and are categorically of two types, sword sucker and water sucker. Generally, sword suckers are preferred over water suckers as the plant developed from water suckers are weak and take longer to bear fruits. Sword suckers can be easily distinguished because of its well developed base with narrow sword shaped blades at the early stages. Two to four months old suckers from healthy and high yielding mother plant should be selected for propagation.

III. Planting methods

Banana suckers are usually planted in a 0.2 to 0.25 m furrow or pit of size 0.6x0.6x0.6 m^{3} at a depth of 0.3 m. But in flood affected areas, suckers should be planted in a pit of size more or less equal to 1 m^{3}. The pit is filled with mixture of topsoil and farmyard manure at a 1:1 ratio and sucker is planted at 0.5 to 0.75 m depth depending upon the height of sand above original ground level. A total of 2 x 3 m spacing should be maintained between the plants.

IV. Crop management

Crop management begins with the planting, continues with crop maintenance during growth and development, and ends with crop harvest, storage and distribution. For good harvest, crop management strategy should be contextualized based on the soil type, topography, climate and availability and affordability of inputs.

== Social aspects ==
=== Early benefits in tribal/clanship culture ===
Certain aboriginal clanships benefited from early development of intensive banana cultivation by expanding previously territorial land views into concepts of cooperative inter-clan trading relationships.

=== Labor conditions ===
Labor conditions in the banana industry have historically drawn attention both in criticism of the traditionally poor industry working conditions, and more recently in attempts by labor advocacy groups and some producers to improve labor conditions.

Workers on banana plantations in Central America have been exposed to pesticides which have been found to cause various health conditions including sterility. Banana industry advocates maintain that exposure levels were too low to produce health issues, but juries in the United States found Dole Food Company guilty of specific cases of worker sterility related to pesticide exposure in the late 1970s. One successful lawsuit presented evidence that Dole continued to use the pesticide DBCP on banana plantations in Nicaragua after the agent was found by the manufacturer to cause health problems and was banned in California in 1977. The jury found the chemical manufacturer, Dow Chemical, 20% liable and Dole 80% liable because Dow had warned Dole of the dangers of aerial spraying in the presence of workers, yet evidence presented in court indicated Dole continued using the agent in close proximity to workers on its Nicaraguan banana plantations. Financial liability in the case was later stricken because of international jurisdiction issues, however the finding of culpability by the jury was left intact.

Child labor on banana plantations has also historically been a heated labor issue. Labor unions, UNICEF, and others have resisted the use of child labor as young as 8 on banana plantations, and have won concessions in some countries such as Ecuador, which instituted a minimum worker age of 15 years. In Sub-Saharan Africa, banana plantations have had a tradition of utilizing child labor that dates to the 19th century and thrives in modern times.

== See also ==
- Banana industry
- Franja Transversal del Norte
