= Crust (baking) =

Hard outer edge of baked goods

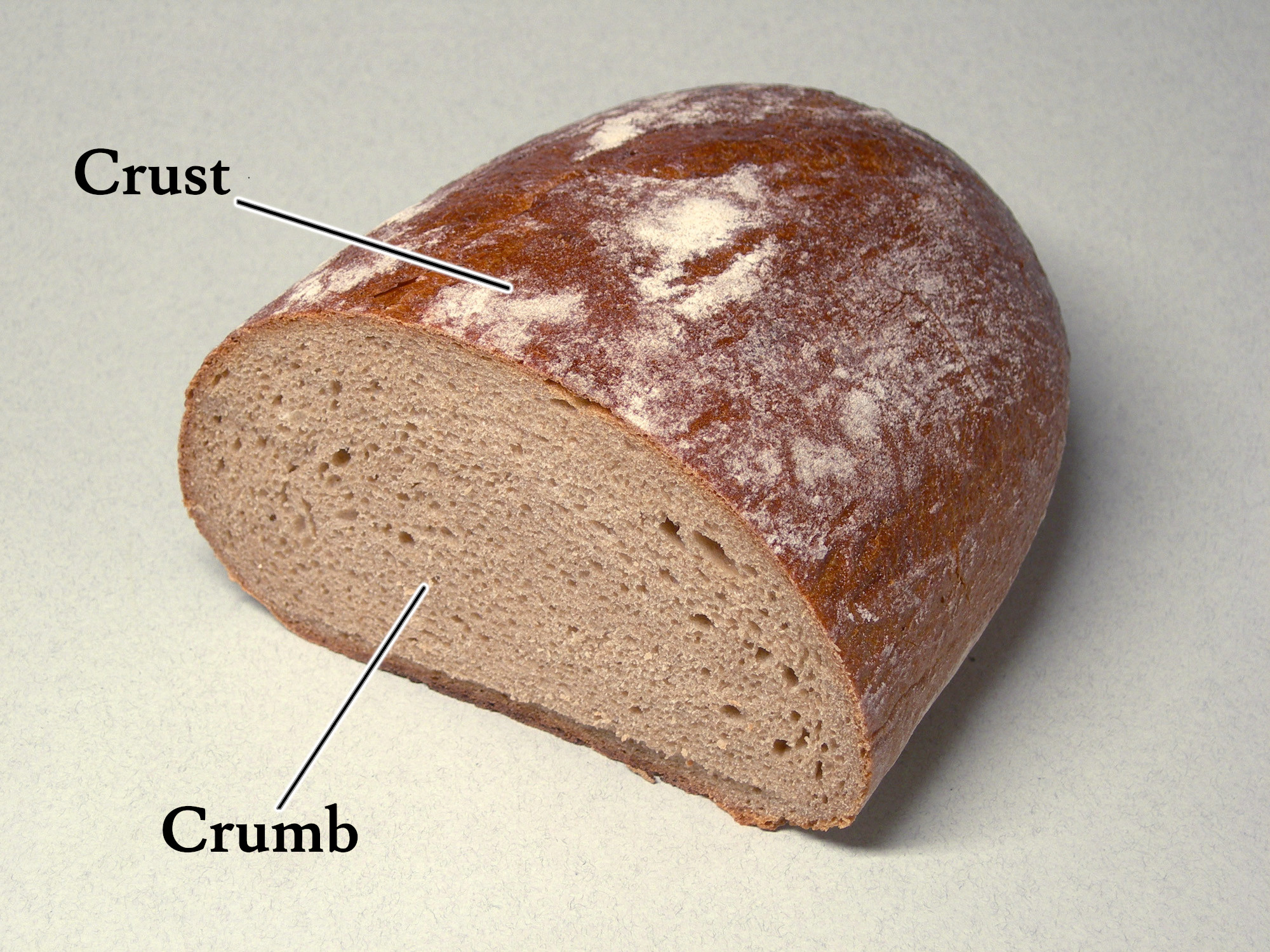
The difference between crumb and crust.

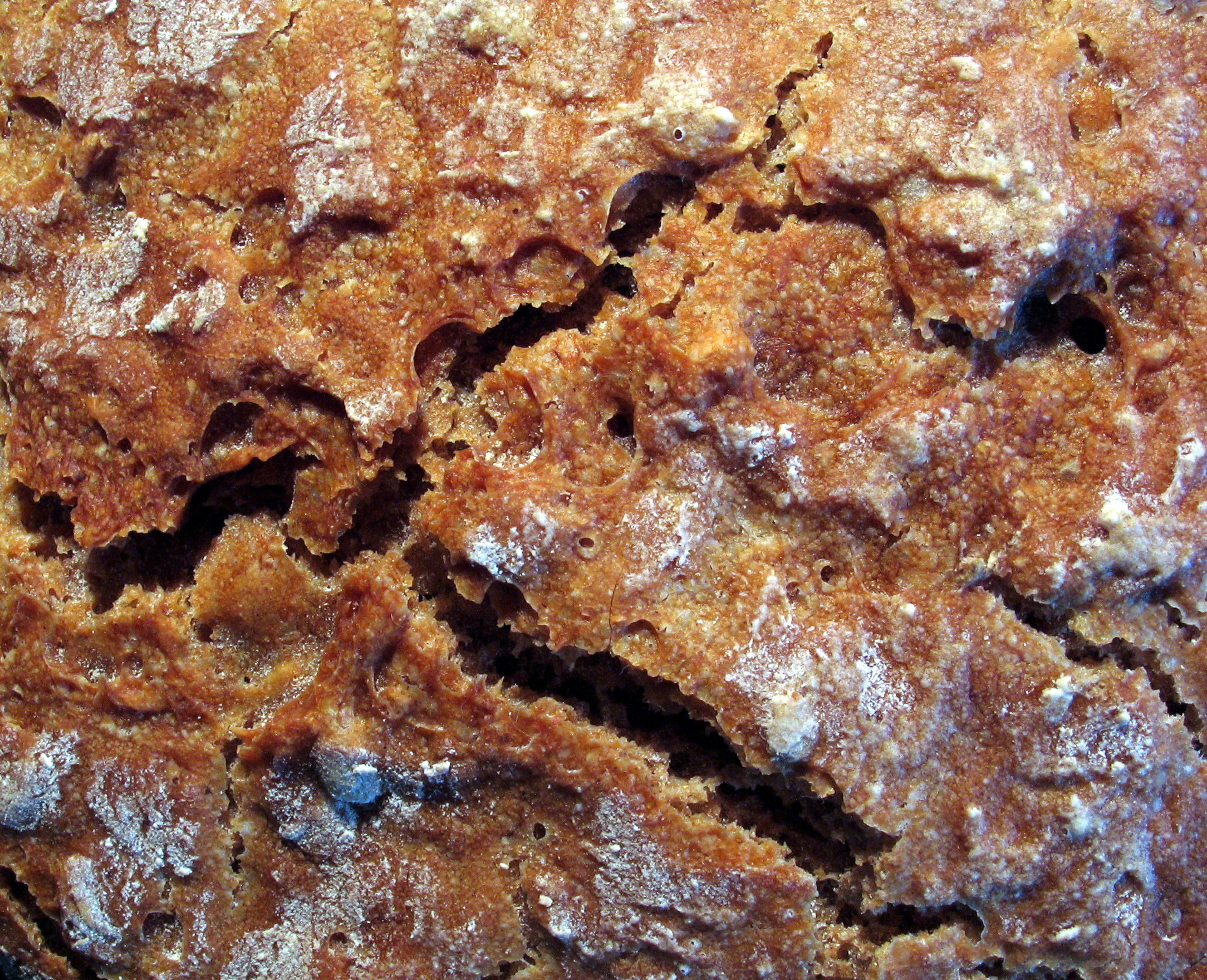
Close up of the crust.

In baking, a crust is the hard outer skin of bread or similar baked goods like rolls.

== Additional ingredients ==
Steam can be added when baking bread in an oven to help brown the crust and make it shiny and crisp:

- Steam prevents a dough from drying out during its initial rise in the oven, allowing the surface to expand further before setting.
- The cooling effect of steam condensing on the surface of the dough during baking extends baking time, providing a longer period during which the Maillard reaction can occur.
- Starch in the dough will gelatinize, absorbing water before eventually bursting and creating a gel. As this gel on the exterior of the dough dries, the surface becomes shiny and crisp.

For enriched doughs (similar to when baking pastry) bakers can apply various ingredients to the surface of shaped doughs to alter their appearance, texture, and flavor. Protein-containing liquids like beaten eggs, milk, and/or cream as well as semisolid fats like butter or butter substitutes brushed on the exterior prior to baking to brown in the oven.. Egg washes in particular can yield a glossy shine, typical on breads like challah.

Savory toppings like nuts, seeds, or cereal grains or sweet toppings like sugar or streusel can be applied to a dough's surface prior to baking for additional flavor and texture.

== Expansion ==
As a dough bakes, it initially puffs and expands, stretching the surface. To accommodate this expansion without the dough tearing or "blowing out", bakers may use a lame to slash (or score) the surface of the shaped loaf, ensuring the expansion occurs in a planned location. This scoring may vary from a single long cut (yielding a shape known as an "ear") to elaborate, decorative patterns. Instead of scoring, bakers may shape bread into rolls or strands. The places where the rolls or strands meet serve as "weak points" similar to slashes in which the bread can expand more dramatically and prevent another part of the crust from tearing. Alternatively, for a more rustic appearance, one can refrain from scoring dough or shaping it into smaller pieces to allow the bread to tear naturally while baking.

== See also ==
- Maillard reaction
