= Banana industry =

Agricultural sector

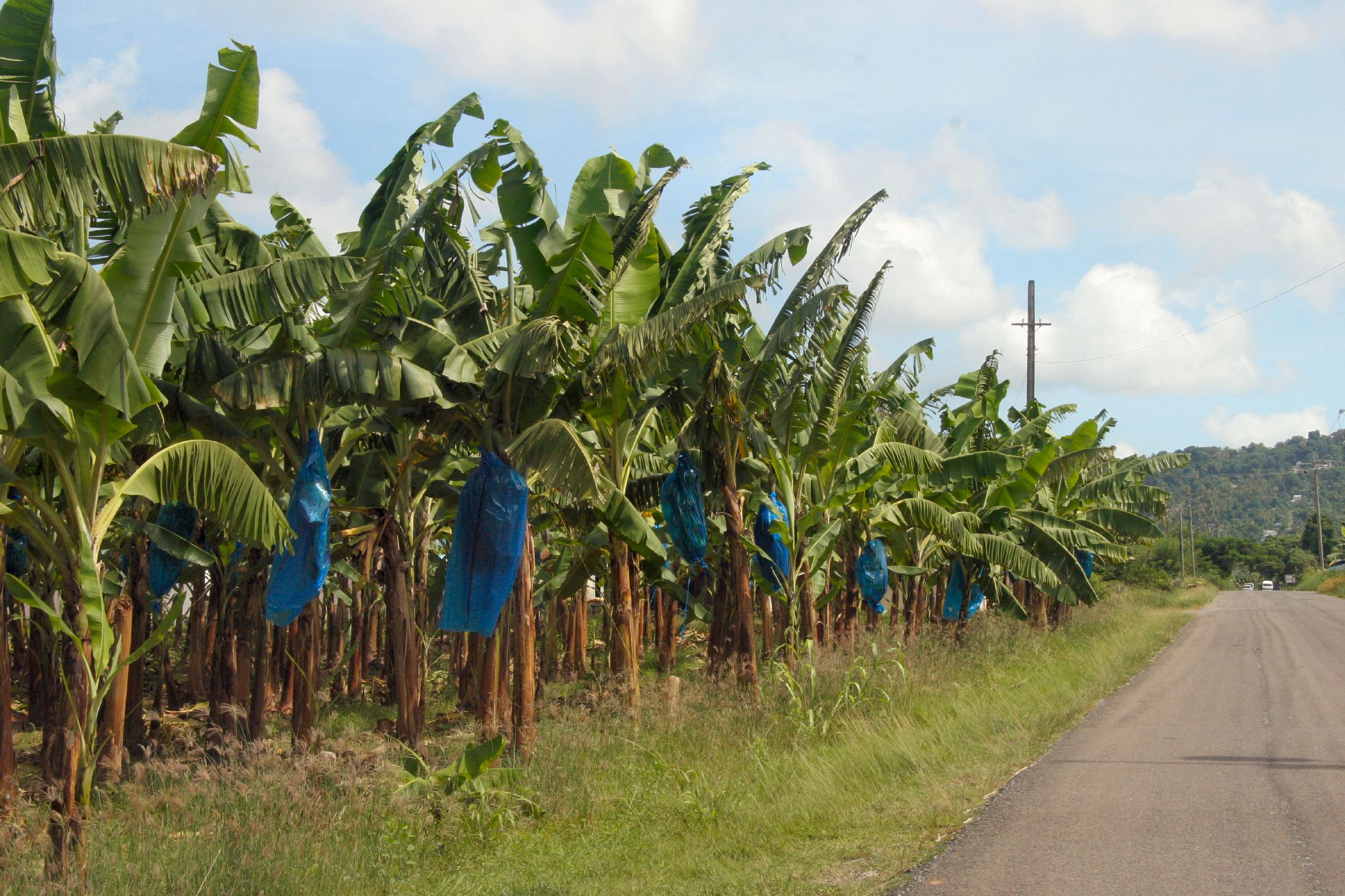
A banana plantation in St. Lucia

The banana industry is a significant sector of global agroindustry.

About 15% of the global banana production enters international trade largely supplying markets in Western countries. Production is concentrated in tropical regions and is often organized around large-scale banana plantations, primarily in the Americas.

== Production and export ==
2016 Production millions of tonnes
Country	Bananas	Plantains	Total
India	29.1		29.1
China	13.1		13.1
Philippines	5.8	3.1	8.9
Ecuador	6.5	0.6	7.1
Indonesia	7.0		7.0
Brazil	6.8		6.8
Colombia	2.0	3.5	5.5
Cameroon	1.2	4.3	5.5
Uganda	0.6	3.7	4.3
Ghana	0.09	4.0	4.1
Guatemala	3.8	0.3	4.1
World	113.3	35.1	148.4
Source: FAOSTAT of the United Nations Note: Some countries produce statistics distinguishing between bananas and plantain production, but four of the top six producers do not, requiring comparisons using the total for bananas and plantains combined.

In 2012 the volume of global gross banana exports reached a record high of 16.5 million metric tons (3.6×10^{10} lb), 1.1 million tonnes (or 7.3 percent) above 2011 level.

In 2013, global exports totaled 20 million tonnes of bananas and 859,000 tonnes of plantains. Ecuador and the Philippines were the leading exporters with 5.4 and 3.3 million tonnes, respectively, and the Dominican Republic was the leading exporter of plantains with 210,350 tonnes. OEC reports that the total value of banana trade in the period from 2020 to 2021 was $13.6 billion, despite a 2.51 percent decline in export growth.

In 2016, world production of bananas and plantains was 148 million tonnes, led by India and China with a combined total (only for bananas) of 28% of global production (table). Other major producers were the Philippines, Ecuador, Indonesia, and Brazil, together accounting for 20% of the world total of bananas and plantains (table).

Bananas are the most popular fruit in the United States, with more consumed annually than apples and oranges combined. In spite of the multitude of banana species across the world, even only taking into account the cultivated ones, industrial production is dominated by the Cavendish banana, which accounts for approximately 65 million tonnes annually.

== Companies ==
In 2025, four multinational fruit companies alone controlled 42%% of the international banana trade:

Company	Country	Market share in 2025 [%]
Chiquita	Switzerland	13
Fyffes	Japan	6
Dole plc	Ireland	11
Del Monte	U.S.	12

The market share of the above players decreased from 70% in 2002 to about 44% in 2013. This decline in market power has been attributed to a couple of reasons. In the past, multinational companies owned a large number of plantations in Central and South America and other banana-producing regions. Since the 1980s they have divested a large share of their own production, replacing it with greater purchases from independent producers and reducing the dominance of vertically integrated multinational companies. For example, Chiquita has decreased the number of its plantations in Central America. Fyffes used to own plantations in Jamaica, Belize and the Windward Islands, but withdrew from production and switched to purchasing its bananas through contracts with producers. These changes reflect a broader shift in the structure of the global banana industry, partly caused by legal and economic problems at the plantation level, and characterized by increased fragmentation of production and a redistribution of market power along the supply chain.

Along the global banana supply chain, major supermarket chains in the US and EU have gained market power over the big producers in the 21st century as they dominate the retail market and increasingly purchase from smaller wholesalers or directly from growers.

== Spread of plant disease ==
The global spread of Tropical Race 4 (TR4), a plant disease affecting banana crops caused by a strain of the soil-borne fungus Fusarium oxysporum, has raised concerns within the industry. Tropical Race 4 affects a wide range of banana cultivars, including the Cavendish variety, which is particularly vulnerable due to its genetic uniformity. The spread of this disease has been linked to the movement of contaminated soil, including via agricultural equipment used in multinational large-scale plantation systems.

== Controversies ==
=== Ecological impact ===
Intensive monoculture methods, such as in banana production, are associated with significant environmental impacts. Banana cultivation relies heavily on pesticide use (estimate: 35 lb/acre, 39 kg/ha) and has been linked to ecosystem destruction through deforestation. Moreover, food miles and plastic packaging contribute to the industry’s overall carbon footprint.

=== Labor and human rights ===
The global banana industry has been associated with labor and human rights violations since its inception in the late 19th century. These include documented reports of forced labor and child labor in some producing regions. As of 2021, the Rainforest Alliance has identified Côte d'Ivoire as the country with the highest risk of forced labor in banana production, followed by countries including Cameroon, Ghana, Guatemala and Ecuador.

== See also ==
- Fruit production
- Banana republic
