= Horticulture industry =

Plant products industry

The horticulture industry embraces the production, processing and shipping of and the market for fruits and vegetables. As such it is a sector of agribusiness and industrialized agriculture. Industrialized horticulture sometimes also includes the floriculture industry and production and trade of ornamental plants.

Among the most important fruits are:

- bananas
- Semi-tropical fruits like lychee, guava or tamarillo
- Citrus fruits
- soft fruits (berries)
- apples
- stone fruits

Important vegetables include:

- Potatoes
- Sweet potatoes
- Tomatoes
- Onions and
- Cabbage

In 2013 global fruit production was estimated at 676.9 million tonnes (666,200,000 long tons; 746,200,000 short tons). Global vegetable production (including melons) was estimated at 879.2 million tonnes (865,300,000 long tons; 969,200,000 short tons) with China and India being the two top producing countries.

== Value chain ==
The horticultural value chain includes:

- Inputs: elements needed for production; seeds, fertilizers, agrochemicals, farm equipment, irrigation equipment, GMO technology
- Production for export: includes fruit and vegetables production and all processes related to growth and harvesting; planting, weeding, spraying, picking
- Packing and cold storage: grading, washing, trimming, chopping, mixing, packing, labeling, blast chilling
- Processed fruit and vegetables: dried, frozen, preserved, juices, pulps; mostly for increasing shelf life
- Distribution and marketing: supermarkets, small scale retailers, wholesalers, food service

== Companies ==
=== Fruit ===
- Chiquita Brands International
- Del Monte Corporation
- Dole Food Company

=== Genetically modified crops / GMO ===
- Monsanto/Bayer
