= Mollete =

Mexican refried beans and cheese sandwich

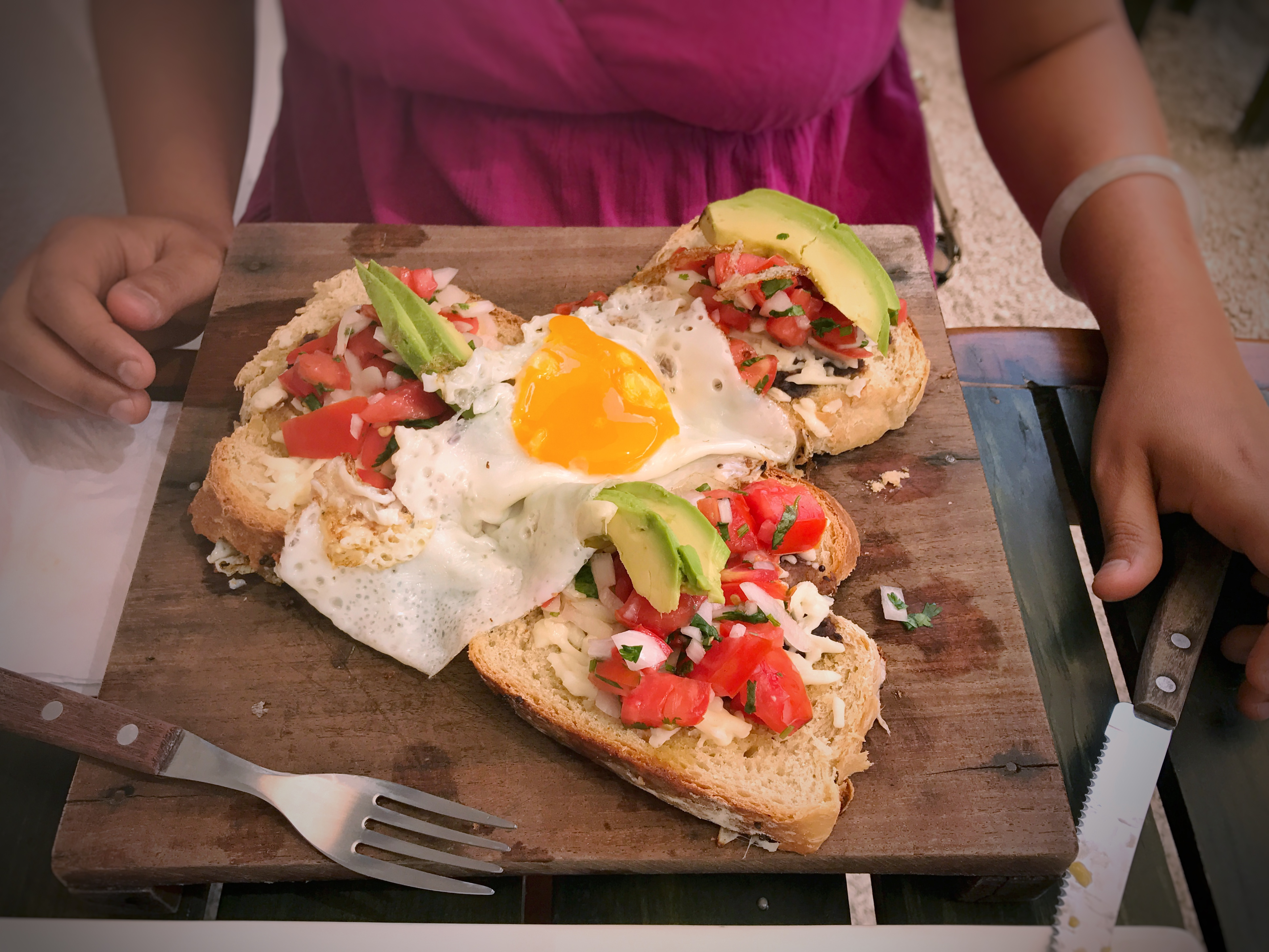
- Type: Bread with refried beans and cheese
- Place of origin: Mexico
- Serving temperature: hot

A mollete (Spanish pronunciation: [moˈʎete]) is an open-faced sandwich with refried beans and white cheese in Mexican cuisine, served hot.

== Etymology ==
The name may be related to the name for a certain type of Spanish bread.

== In Mexican cuisine ==
A mollete, native to Mexico City, is made with bolillos sliced lengthwise and partially hollowed, filled with refried beans, and topped with cheese and occasionally slices of jalapeño or serrano peppers. It is then grilled in an oven until the cheese melts. The refried beans are "frijol mantequilla" (literally, "butter beans") known outside of the region as "pinto beans".

The traditional cheeses used are queso ranchero, queso asadero, or queso menonita. The queso ranchero is most similar to Parmesan with less aging, the asadero is a creamy provolone, and the menonita most closely resembles Havarti. Other cheeses, such as mozzarella cheese, may be used as well.

Molletes in southern Mexico can be served with salsa or pico de gallo or topped with sliced ham, chorizo, bacon or mushrooms.

There is also a "sweet type" mollete typical of the Jalisco región and in Guadalajara, where the bolillo is buttered, sprinkled with sugar or honey, and broiled until crisp.

Molletes can be eaten as a simple, inexpensive breakfast.

== See also ==
- List of Mexican dishes
- Cheeses of Mexico
