= Snap freezing =

Process of rapid cooling of a substance for the purpose of preservation

Snap freezing (or cook-chill or blast freezing) is the process of rapid cooling of a substance for the purpose of preservation. It is widely used in the culinary and scientific industries.

== Scientific use ==
Snap-freeze is a term often used in scientific papers to describe a process by which a sample is very quickly lowered to temperatures below -70 °C. This is often accomplished by submerging a sample in liquid nitrogen. This prevents water from crystallising when it forms ice, and so better preserves the structure of the sample (e.g. RNA, protein, or live cells).

== See also ==
- Flash freezing
- Blast chilling
