= Manteca colorá =

Andalusian cooking ingredient and dish

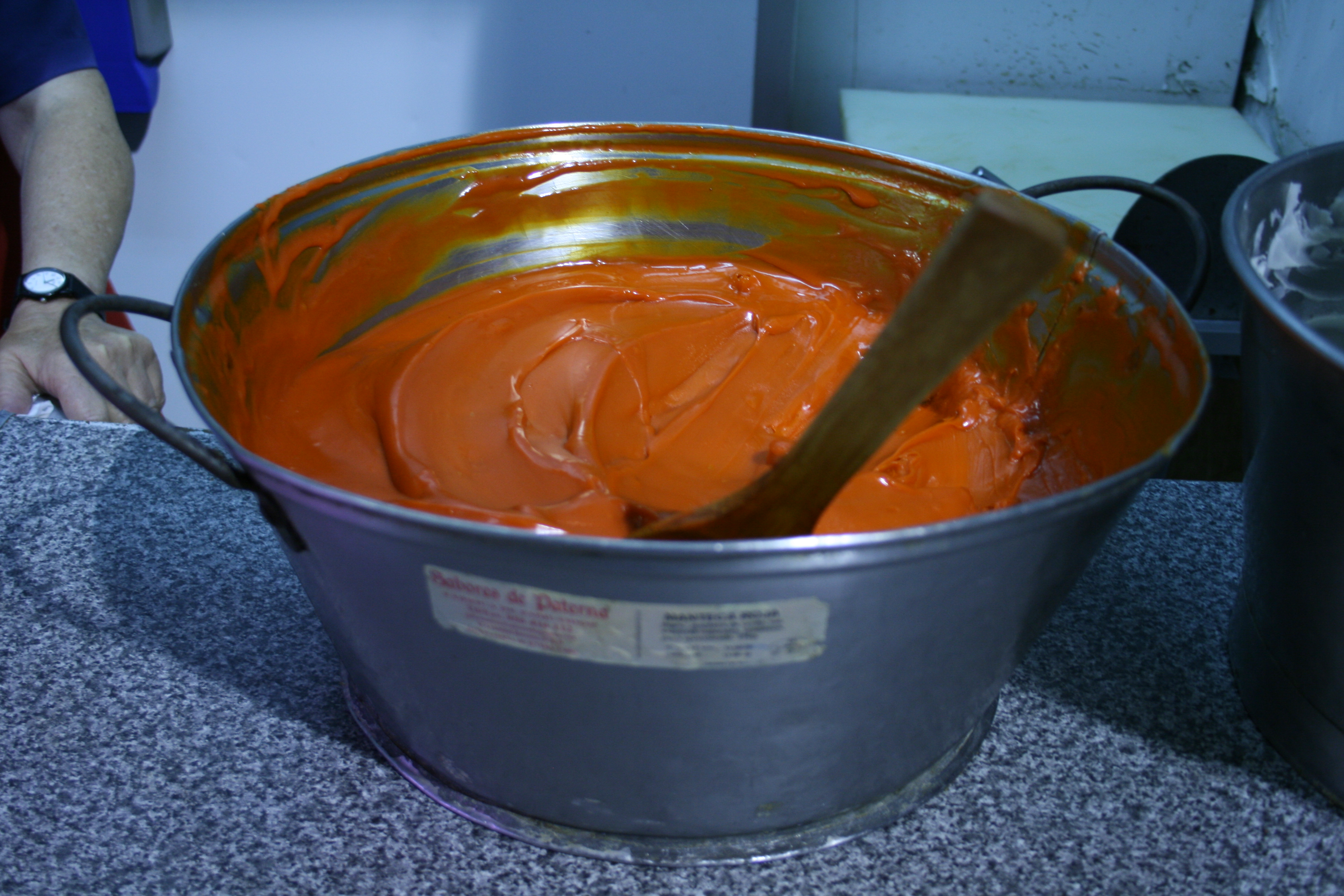
- A saucepan with freshly cooked Manteca colorá in the Cádiz central market
- Type: Spread
- Main ingredients: Lard, paprika

Manteca colorá (Andalusian pronunciation for "red lard") is a food item prepared by adding spices (usually bay leaf and oregano) and paprika – which is what gives the dish its characteristic orange colour – to lard, which is then cooked with minced or finely chopped pieces of pork.

It is a dish typical of Andalusia and Extremadura in southern Spain, where it is usually consumed spread on toasted bread.

== See also ==
- List of spreads
