= Lame (kitchen tool) =

Blade used to slash the tops of bread loaves

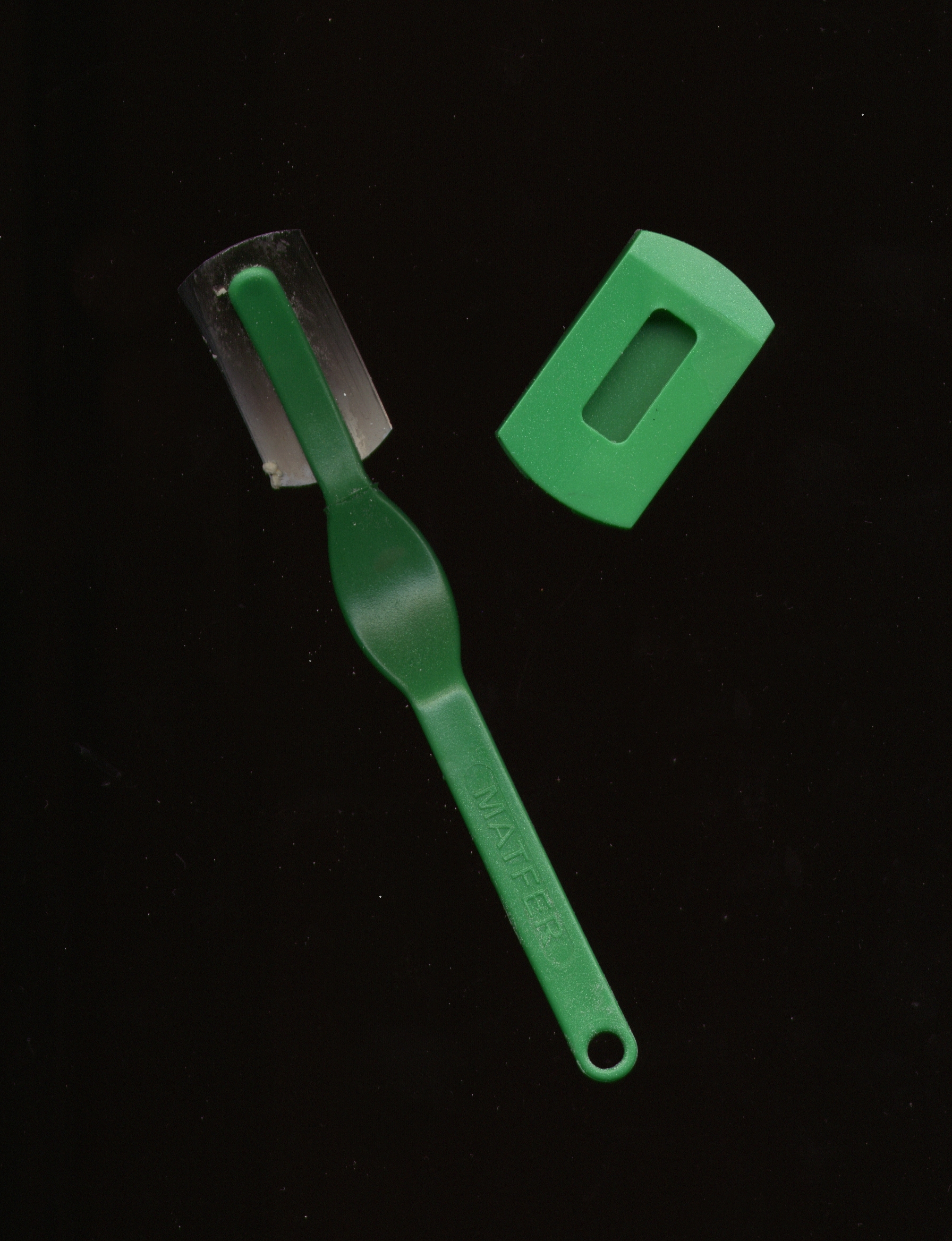
A lame with plastic handle and protective cover

A lame (/læm, leɪm/, from French lame, derived from Latin lāmina, meaning blade) is a double-sided blade that is used to slash the tops of bread loaves before baking. A lame is used to score (also called slashing or docking) bread just before the bread is placed in the oven. Often the blade's cutting edge will be slightly concave, which allows users to cut flaps (called shag) considerably thinner than would be possible with a straight razor.

A slash on the loaf's surface allows the dough to expand in the oven without tearing the skin or crust while also allowing moisture to escape from the loaf. Scoring releases some of the gas, mainly carbon dioxide, that is trapped inside the dough. Scoring also allows the baker to control where the loaf will open or bloom, which improves the appearance of baked breads. Scoring also creates varieties of form and appearance, so brings out the bread baker's artistic talent, allowing a unique signature.

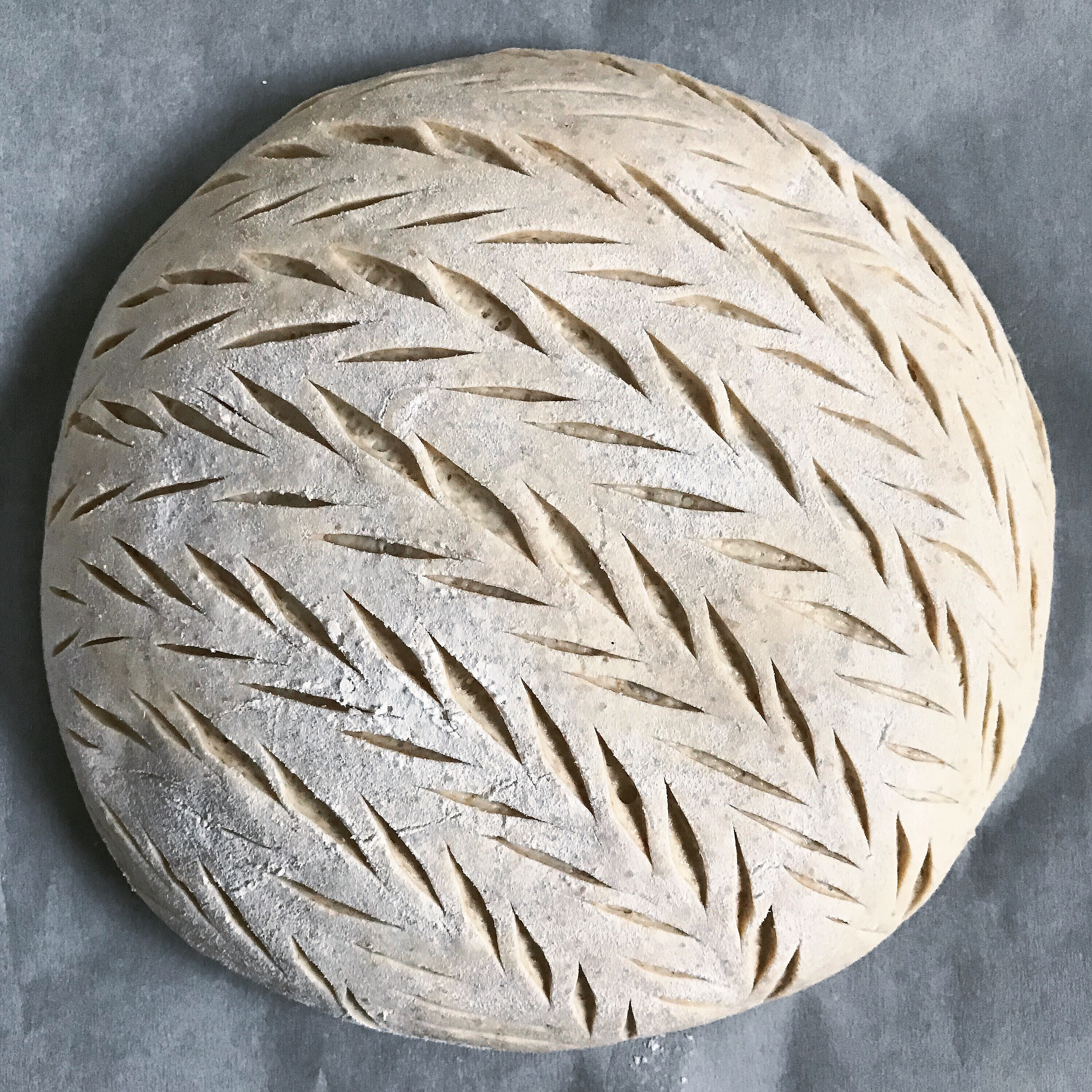
Sourdough scored with lame, before baking

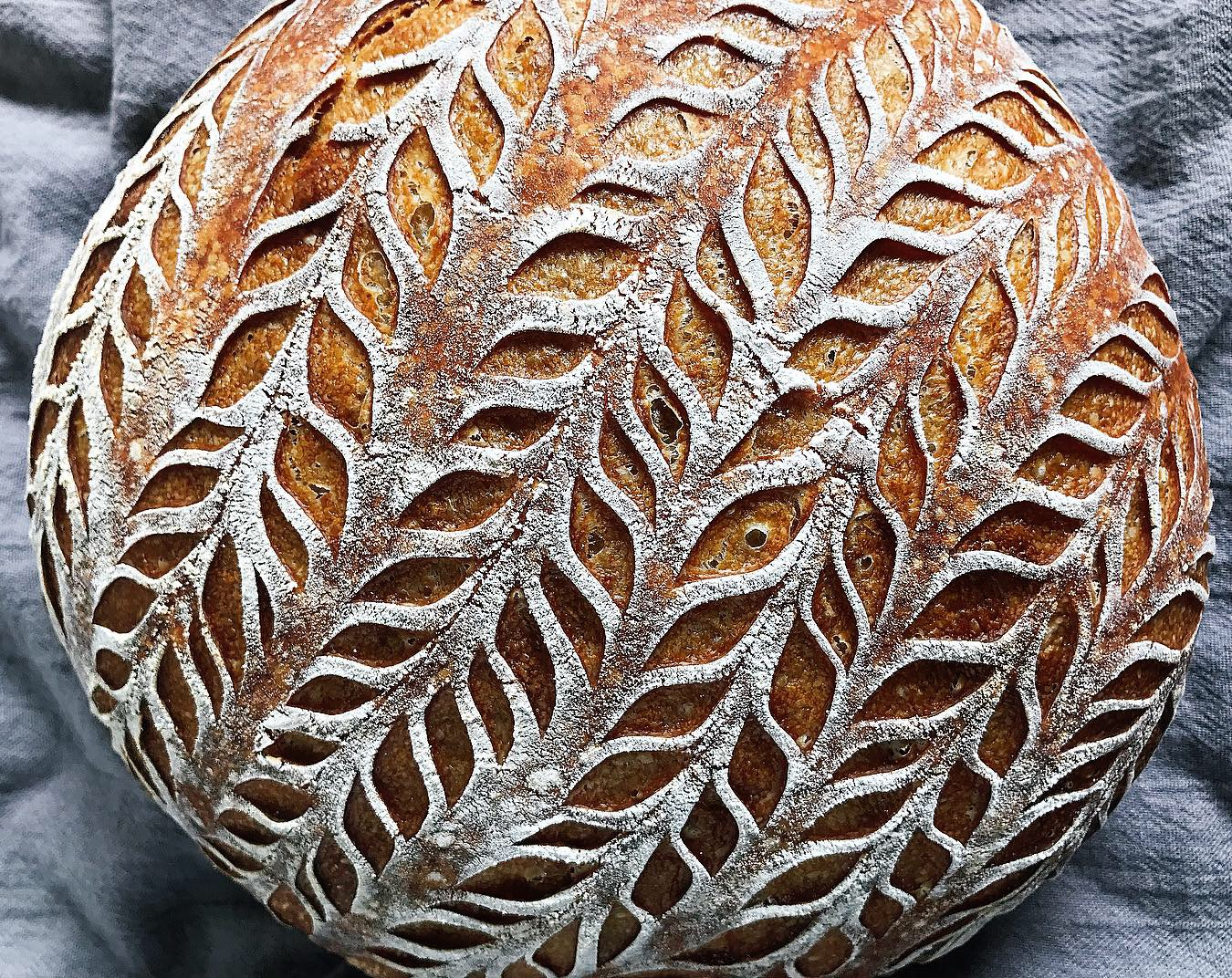
Sourdough bread scored with lame, after baking

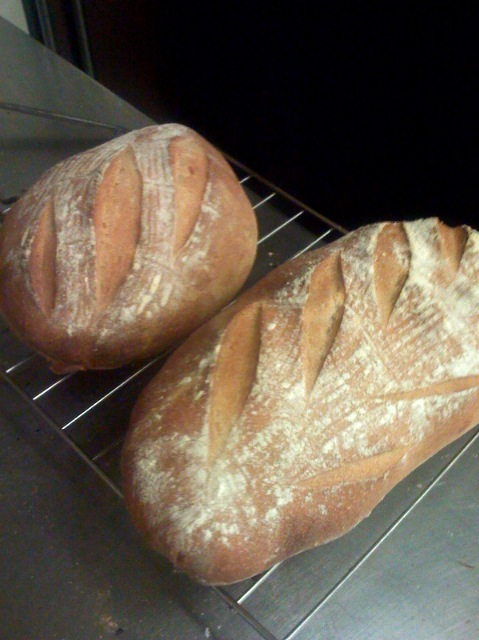
Scored loaves of artisan French-style country bread

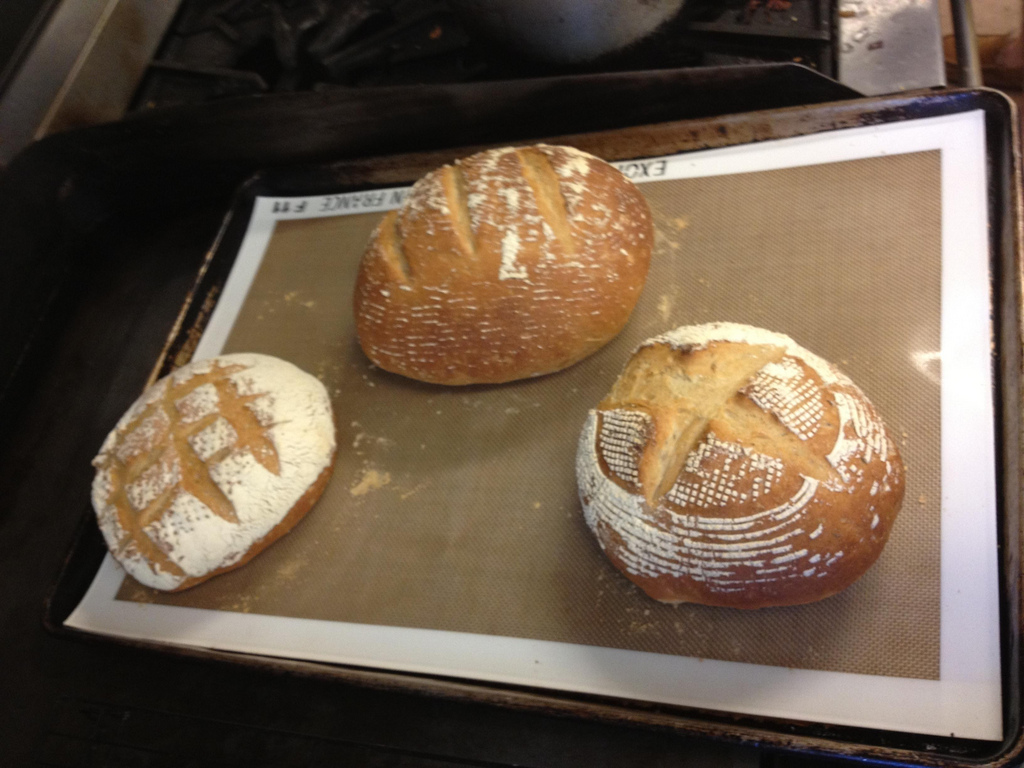
Loaves of rye bread showing several different kinds of scoring patterns
