= Blast chilling =

Method of cooling food quickly

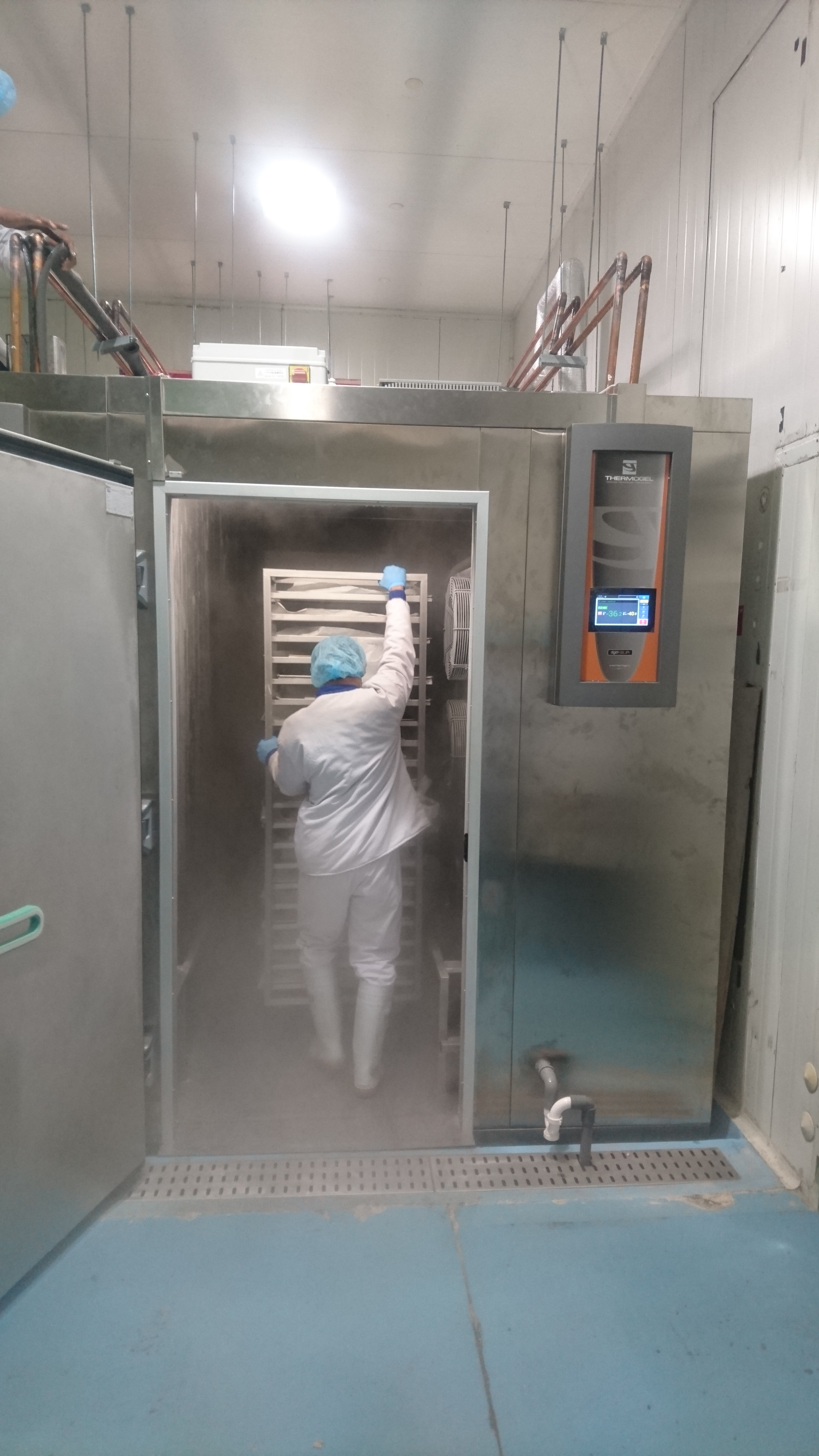
Commercial blast chiller

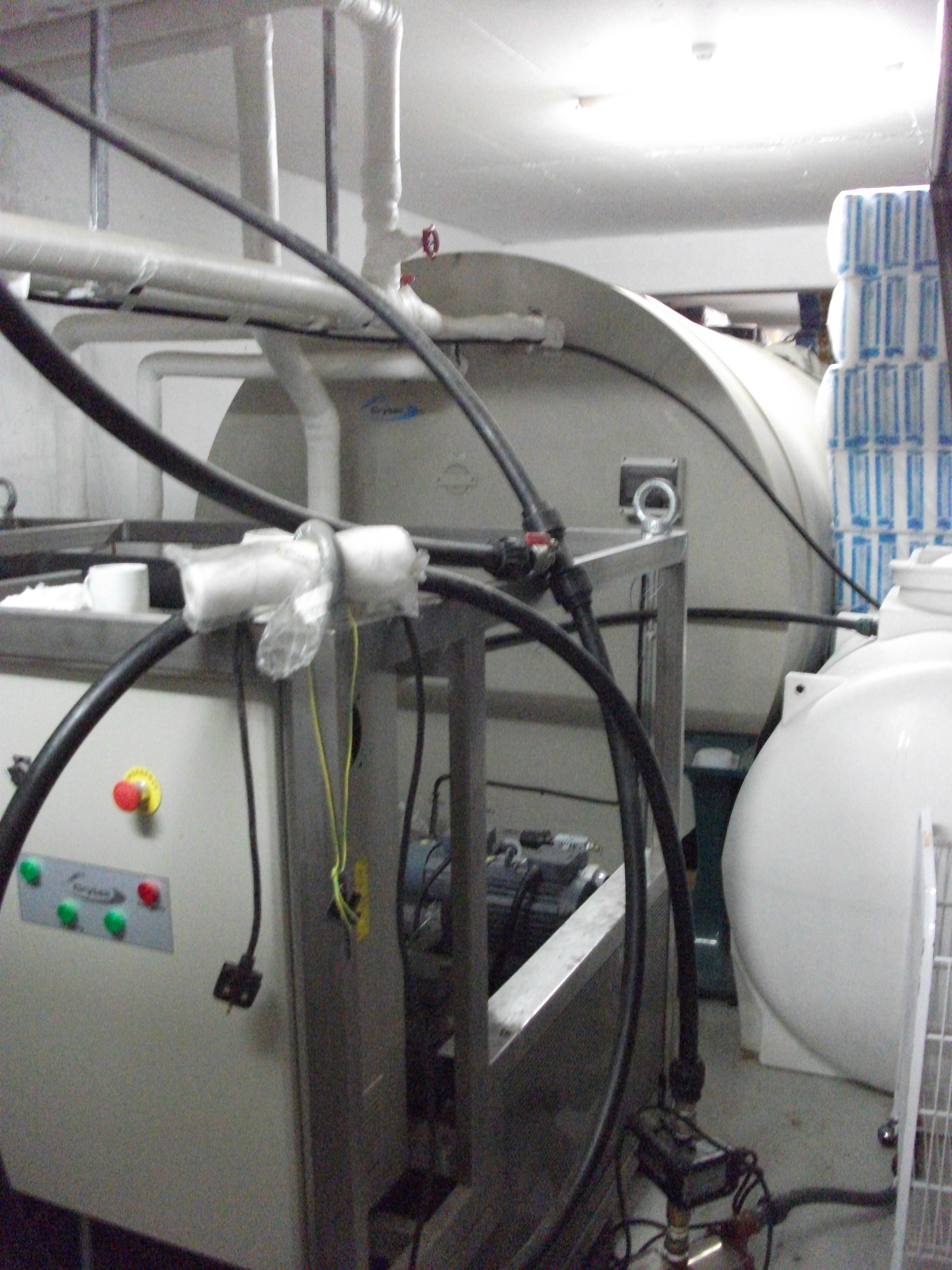
Pumpable ice maker and food storage tank

Blast chilling is a method of cooling food quickly to a low temperature that is relatively safe from bacterial growth. Bacteria multiply fastest between +8 and +68 °C (46 and 154 °F). By reducing the temperature of cooked food from +70 to +3 °C (158 to 37 °F) or below within 90 minutes, the food is rendered safe for storage and later consumption. This method of preserving food is commonly used in food catering and, recently, in the preparation of "instant" foods, as it ensures the safety and the quality of the food product.

The blast chiller is a cousin of the refrigerator, another appliance designed to store food between +3 and +5 °C (37 and 41 °F), but the blast chiller is a higher grade and more expensive appliance and is usually only found in commercial kitchens. As of 2013, in the UK, blast chillers are typically priced from £2,000 to £8,000 excluding value-added tax.

Use of blast chillers is prescribed for the restaurants of the European Union, e.g. in the regulations 852/2004 or 853/2004.

== See also ==
- Flash freezing
- Snap freezing
- Food storage
- Food preservation
- Pumpable ice technology
