= Bread in Spain =

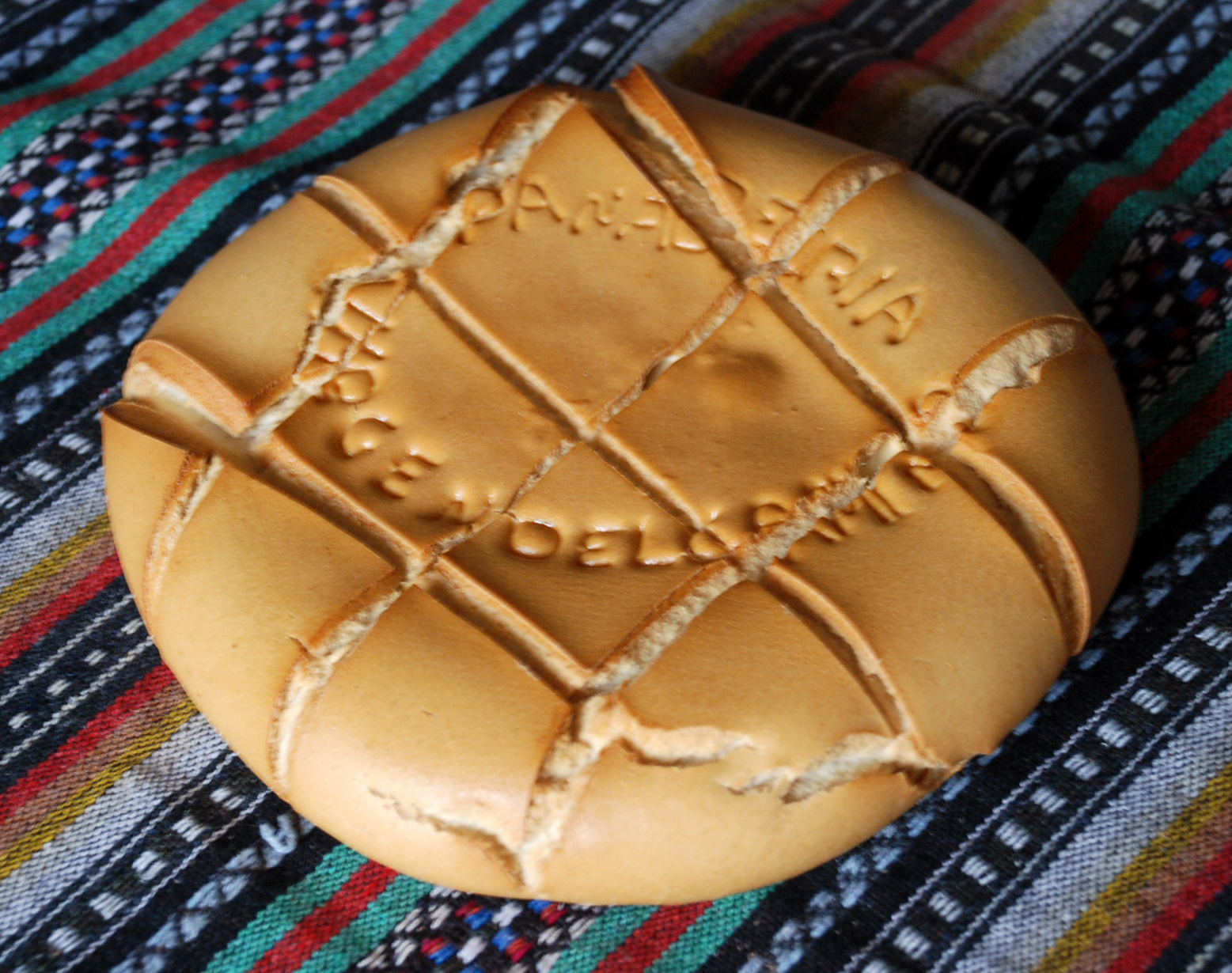
Sobado bread, also called candeal or bregado

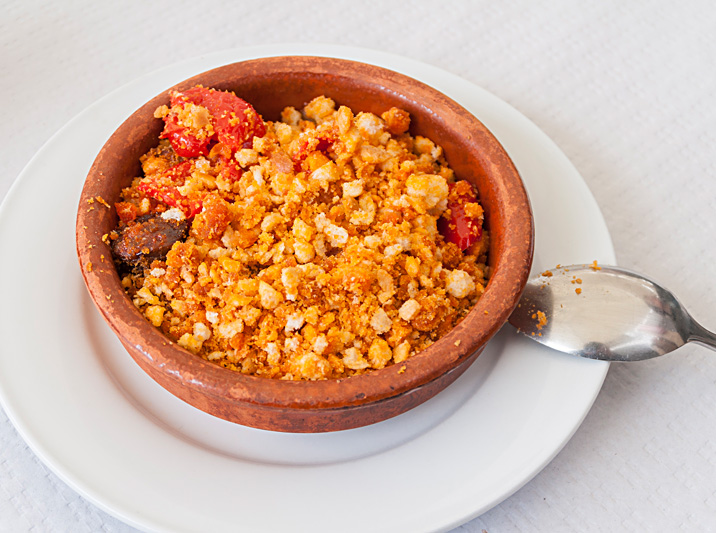
Migas, a traditional Spanish dish of humble origins, whose main ingredient is "old" bread (stale bread)

Bread in Spain (pan in Spanish) (Note: Pan in Spanish and Galician; Pa in Catalan; Ogia in Basque. Hogaza for loaf, and panecillo for a roll.) is a staple food that accompanies daily meals year-round. The Iberian Peninsula has some of the greatest bread diversity in Europe. Spanish food writer José Carlos Capel estimates there are 315 Spanish breads. The most popular, barra (baguette-shaped bread), makes up 75% of bread consumption. Bread serves historical, cultural, religious, and mythological purposes.

Wheat is the most cultivated cereal in the country, as it can withstand the interior's dry climate. As a result, white flours—characterized by a light and spongy texture—are more common in southern Europe, whereas darker breads are preferred in the north. North of the Pyrenees, rye flour and other grains are commonly mixed –called méteil in French–, as well as whole-wheat flour. Whole-wheat bread has recently become popular in Spain due to interest in healthier eating. Throughout Spanish history (especially the Civil War and later Franco regime), rye, barley, buckwheat, or whole-wheat breads were considered food for the poor.

Candeal, bregado or sobado bread has a long tradition in Castile, Andalusia, Leon, Extremadura, Araba, Valencia, and Zaragoza. This bread is made with Candeal wheat flour, a durum wheat endemic to Iberia and the Balearic Islands. Dough is flattened with a rolling pin or a two-cylinder gramola. Similar hard-dough breads are also found in Italy (such as coppia ferrarese and baule mantovano) and in Portugal (such as pão sovado and regueifa).

Bread is used in many Spanish recipes, such as ajoblanco, preñaos, migas, pa amb tomàquet, salmorejo, and torrijas. Bread became important in traditional Spanish cuisine, especially in inland Spain, as an efficient use of ingredients. Historically, the Spanish have been known to be high consumers of bread, though bread consumption in the country has declined and Spanish bakeries have reoriented. People eat less and lower-quality bread, while the baker's job is becoming mechanized and tradition is simplifying, according to Capel and author Ibán Yarza.

== History ==
Bread was produced in the Iberian Peninsula before the arrival of the Romans. The Iberian people mastered the fermentation process, and cultivated wheat and other cereals such as einkorn and barley. Bakeries became a public establishment due to influence Greek, and Romans introduced improved structures such as mills and ovens. Numerous signa pistoris ('bread stamps') have been found throughout Hispania. These were used by Romans to "mark" bread for religious reasons. Marked pieces found in central Europe allude more to the imperial cult, while Iberia related more to Roman mythology.

In Rome, bakers made sourdough using leftover dough for yeast, however in Hispania the locals used beer foam, making lighter and fluffier bread. Pliny the Elder, a Roman originally from northern Italy, served as a procurator in the Iberian Peninsula and commented: "Hispania's bread is very light and very pleasing to the palate even for a refined man from Rome".

Cereal cultivation was the dominant work during the Andalusian period (8th to 15th century), and bread was a daily staple. In Al-Andalus, white bread was made from wheat flour, and coarser and less expensive "red bread" contained bran. On the Christian side of the border, the baker's trade became a relevant and respected profession within society. After the 12th century, bakers formed unions to regulate the market. In Spain, especially along the Mediterranean, bakers' guilds have existed for more than 750 years. For example, the Guild of Bakers of Barcelona (Gremio de Panaderos de Barcelona) has been documented as early as 1395.

The Spanish conquest of America introduced a new cereal: maize. Maize has a presence in the bakery of "Green Spain" (northern Spain). An example of maize bread is boroña, brona or broa, a typical bread from Galicia, Asturias, Cantabria, and the Basque Country.

== List of Spanish breads ==
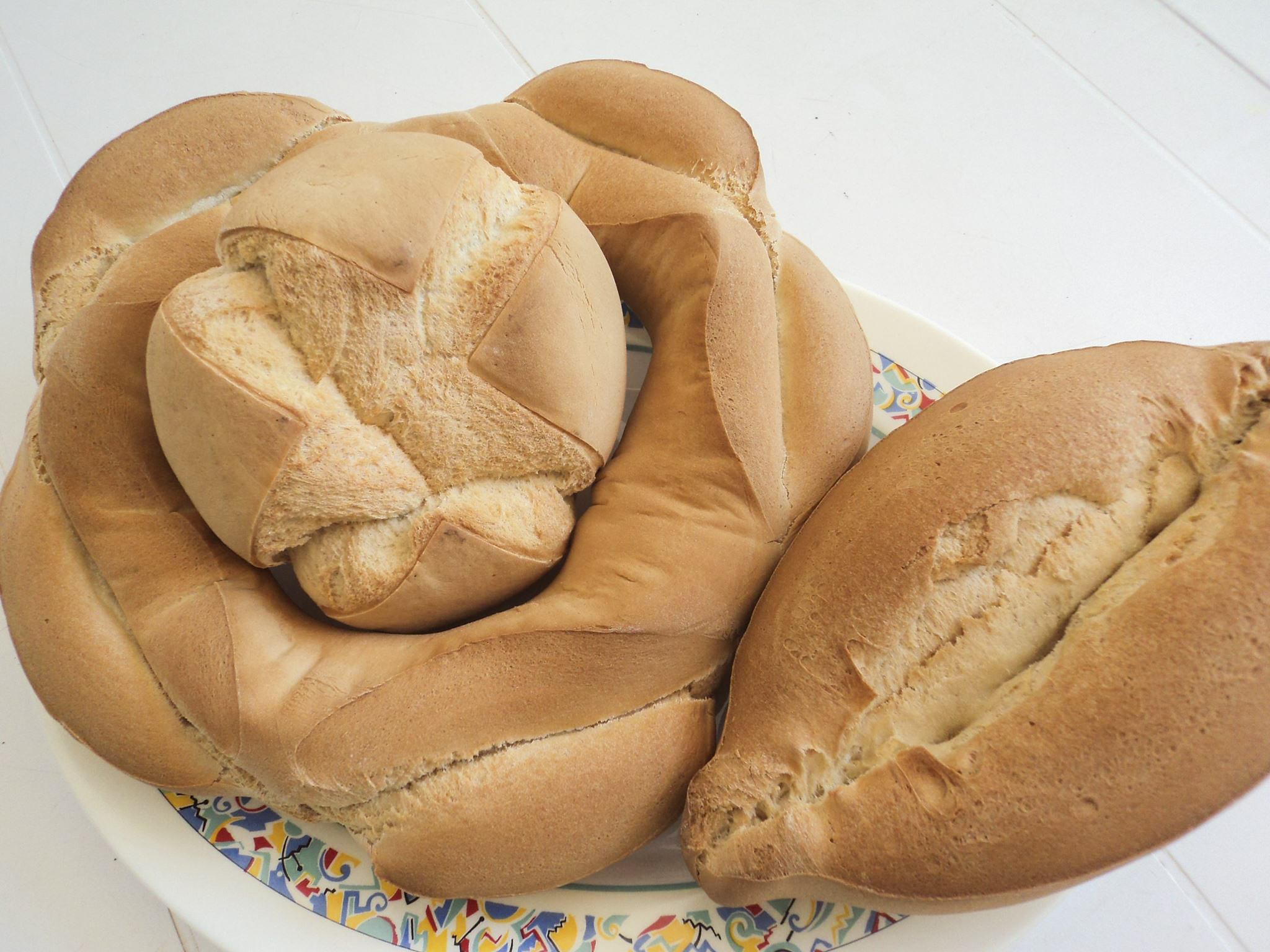
Pan de cruz, mentioned in Don Quixote

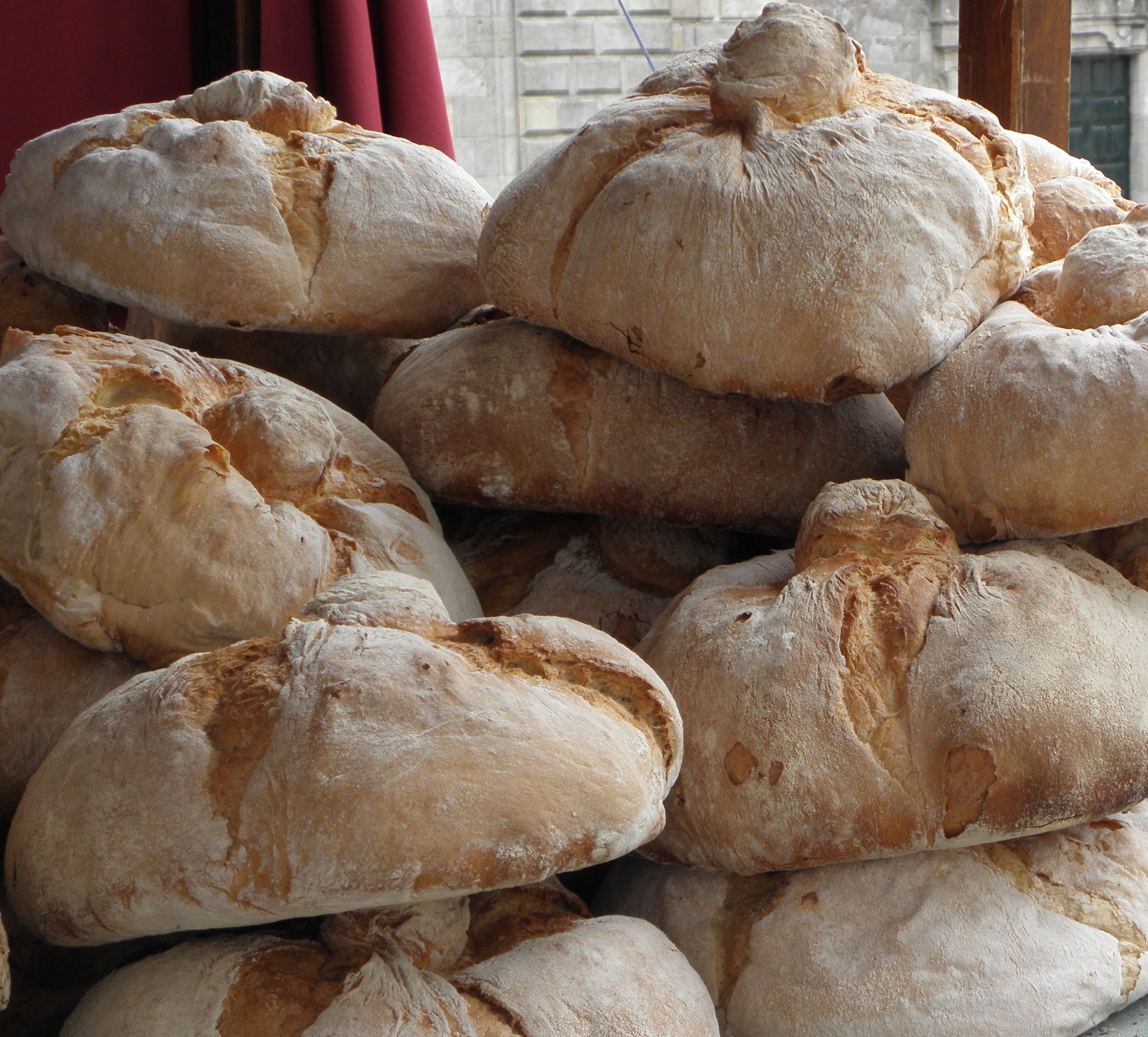
Galician bread, a Protected Geographical Indication (PGI)

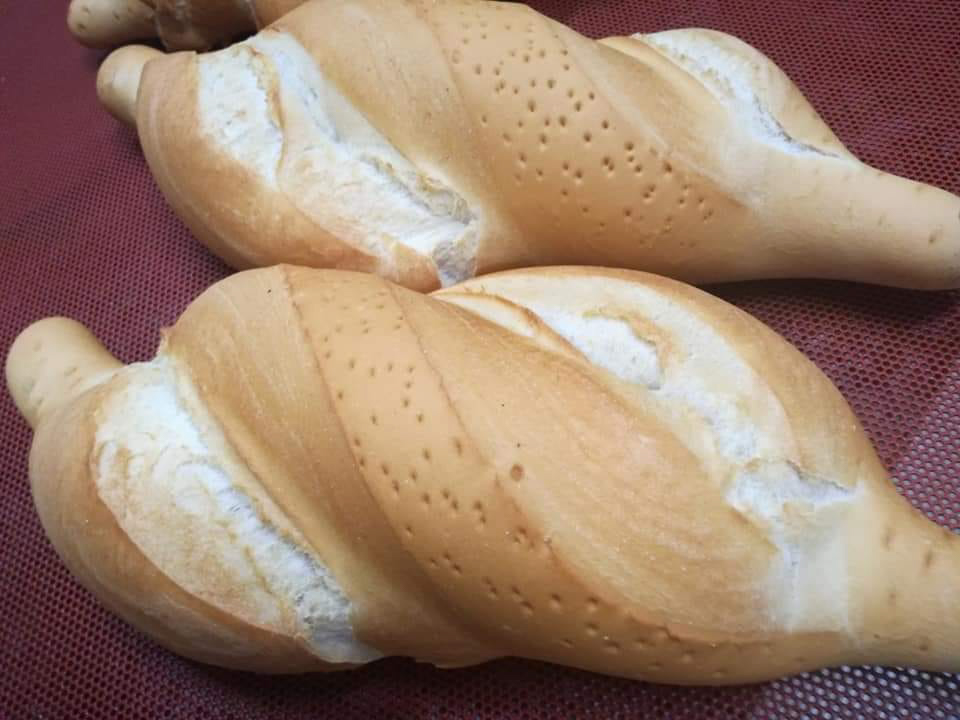
Telera from Córdoba

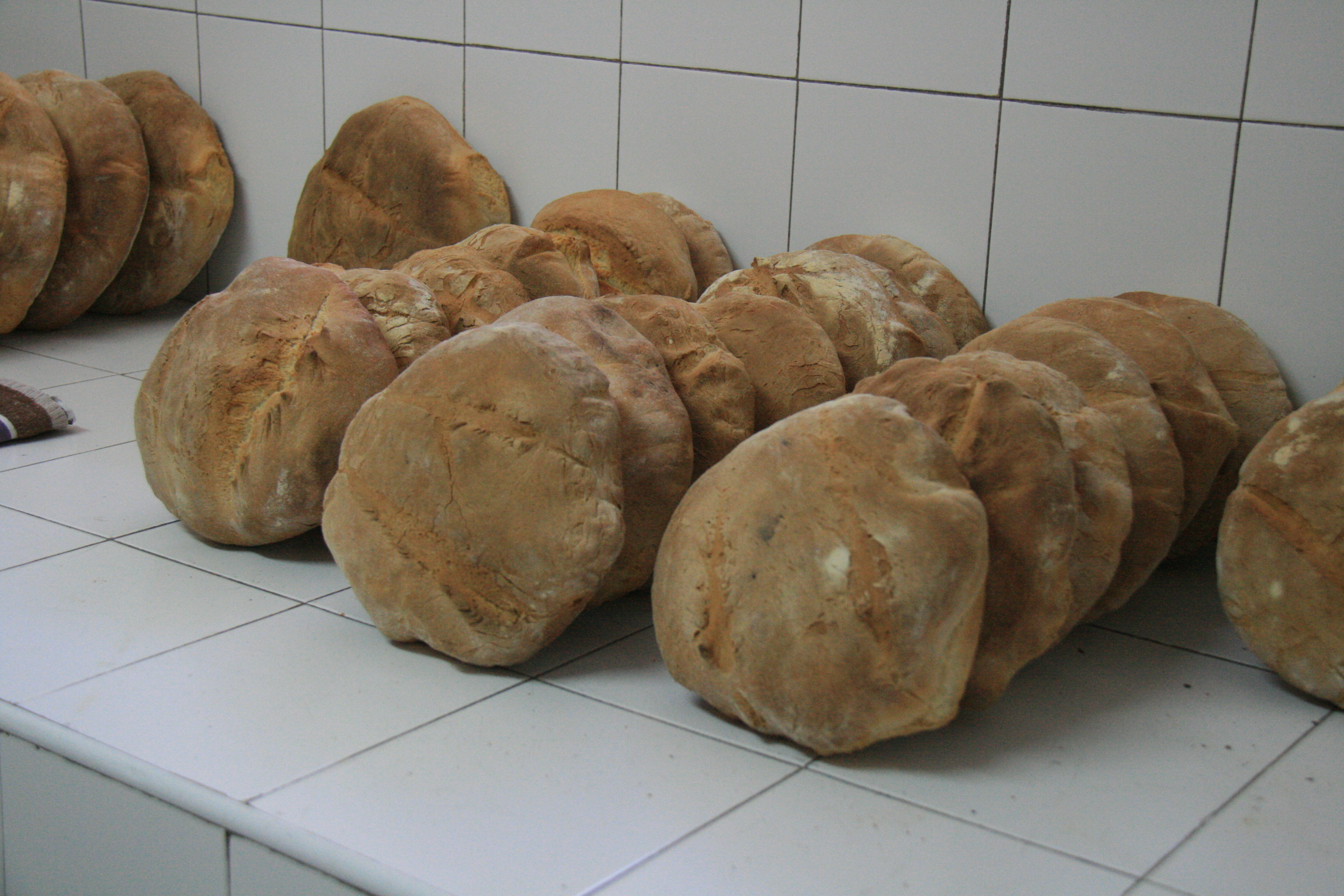
Pan de Manganeses, country loafs from Zamora

This is a list of many popular breads in Spain.

- Pan de payés (Pa de pagès in Catalan), from Catalonia
- Pan gallego (Pan galego in Galician), from Galicia
- Pan de Alfacar, in Andalusia
- Pan de Manganeses, in Zamora
- Pan cateto, in Southern Andalusia
- Bollo, from Seville
- Candeal, bregado or sobado, from Castile and many other regions
- Cañada bread, a flatbread with olive oil, from Aragón
- Mollete, from Archidona, Málaga and Antequera, Málaga
- Pan de cruz, from Ciudad Real
- Pan de la Mota, from Mota del Cuervo, Cuenca
- Carrasca, from Murcia
- Pataqueta, from the Valencian Community
- Telera, from Córdoba
- Taja, from Navarre
- Colón and Fabiola, from Castile and Leon
- Llonguet, a roll from Catalonia and the Balearic Islands
- Francesilla, from Madrid
- Pistola, from Madrid
- Broa, boroña, from Northern Spain

Bread with toppings:

- Coca
- Regañao from Teruel
- Bollo de Requena, Valencia

Bread with fillings:

- Hornazo
- Galician empanada
- Bollo preñao

Sweet breads:

- Roscón de Reyes
- Jallulla, from Granada
- Pan de cañada, from Aragón
- Torta de Aranda
- Ensaimada, from Mallorca
- Toña, tonya, fogaza, fogassa, mona or panquemao
- Txantxigorri cake
- Pitufo, from Málaga

== Bread and culture ==
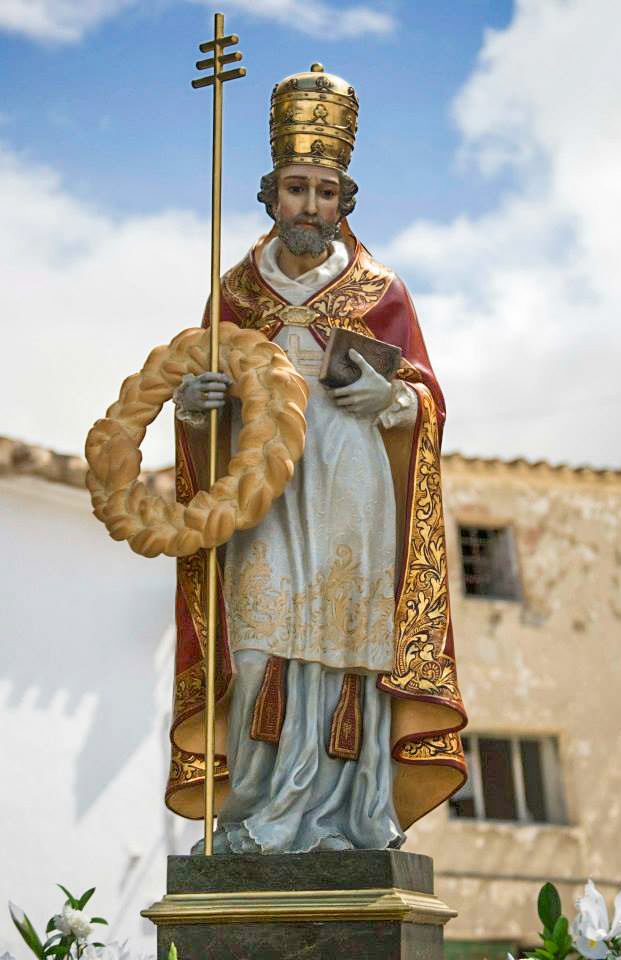
Procession of San León in Benamaurel (Andalusia), where the neighbors prepare and offer bagels to the saint

Bread has a ritual function and a religious significance in Spain. In Christianity, bread and wine embody the body and blood of Christ, comprising the Eucharist in Christian churches. Even before Christianity, pagan traditions (including Celtic, Greco-Roman, Phoenician) considered bread a fertility symbol. For example, in Ancient Rome, pieces of bread were offered to Ceres, goddess of crops and fertility. Christianity absorbed many of these traditions that use bread.

=== Bread and fertility rites ===
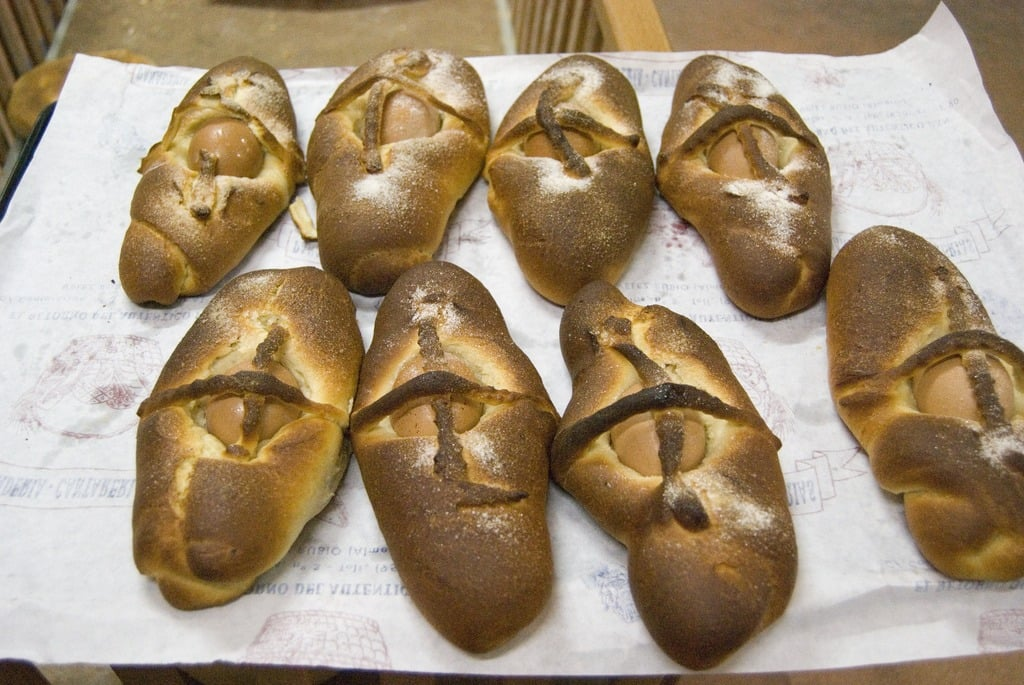
The traditional hornazo and mona includes boiled eggs, although today the monas with chocolate eggs, or directly without eggs, are more typical. This is a tradition of pagan origin.

Eggs were also associated with fertility in many ancient cultures. Many traditions have survived, embed whole eggs into bread dough in spring. This done for the Catalan monas, the Basque opillas, and the Castilian San Marcos hornazo. In these breads, a boiled egg is tied to the bread with two intertwined dough strips in the shape of a cross, linking a pagan custom to Christian mythology.

=== Bread and death rites ===
As a votive or mortuary offering, bread has embodied death in most Mediterranean cultures. It was common at funerals to distribute loaves. According to anthropologist Joan Amades, "At funerals it was customary to offer rolls that the attendees gave to the priest, along with a candle." When a loved one died, "there should be bread in the house to facilitate the transit."

In Spain, when the dead visit their families on All Souls' Day (November 2), they are offered a votive bread called pan de ánimas ('bread of souls'), although nowadays panets and panellets are more typical. This tradition is called "bread of the dead" in Mexico. In some Catalan towns, bread with a cross in the middle (pa de memòria) is served at supper after a funeral, dedicated with a prayer to the deceased. Breads of the dead can be found throughout Spain and the Mediterranean, such as the pan de finado from the Canary Islands, the "saint's bones" from Madrid, or the anthropomorphic breads from Sicily and southern Italy.

=== Bread on the table ===
In Spain, many Christian families bless bread before beginning a meal, thanking God for "giving us our daily bread" while a cross is marked on the crust, leaving the first slice untouched, or giving it to guests. The relevance of bread at the Christian table is reflected in the marks that are stamped on the loaves: Viva el Pan Bendito ("Long live the blessed bread"), Soy el Principal de la mesa ("I am the main one at the table"), Mírame atento, Soy tu alimento ("Look at me attentively, I am your food"), etc. Wasting or throwing away a piece of bread was considered a rejection of food of the Lord. (Note: The sacrilege of bread was common to all Christianity in medieval times. See for example the German Brotfrevel.)

== Cultural loss and recovery policy ==
Bread has been the most consumed food in Spain throughout its history. Its prominence was overshadowed by the abundance of food that came in the 1960s and 1970s, when agriculture mechanized and the country opened to the world. The reduction in bread consumption led to a loss of quality, tradition, and culture. According to culinary researcher Ibán Yarza: "Bread has lost prestige or, better said, it has been demystified, in the sense that it was sacred because it was what was eaten the most ( ...) Never has less bread been eaten than now." It goes hand in hand with a drastic reduction of the Mediterranean culinary tradition, like neighboring Italy. (Note: "(...) [In] the case of Italy, from the end of the 19th century to the middle of the 20th century, the food consumption of wine, olive oil, and wheat (and derivatives) has been the only which has remained steady, unlike foods that have experienced a sharp rise, such as meat, fresh fruit, sugar or coffee, or others that have experienced a decline, such as legumes or maize. In the same vein, Gonález Turmo states that Spain, until the 1960s, maintained a diet very close to the Mediterranean model, while today it is Greece and Portugal that are closest to the prototype" (Medina 1996, p. 21).)

Starting in the 2010s, renewed interest in traditional Spanish baking emerged. This movement has given rise to names such as Beatriz Echeverría from El Horno de Babette in Madrid, who has a YouTube channel about baking with the most subscriptions (in Spanish) and is author of the book The Elements of Bread. The Turris bakery chain in Barcelona, run by Xavier Barriga, author of several bakery books, has also rose in the revival of traditional Spanish baking. Since 2017, Panàtics has organized the "Route through Spain of good bread" (Ruta del Buen Pan), an annual selection of one hundred artisan bakeries from all over Spain. Spanish law approved a standard for bread quality on April 26, 2019 (Royal Decree 308/2919).

== Influence of Spanish baking ==
=== In Europe ===
The candeal, bregado, or sobado bread, originating in Castile and León, spread to the peninsula's south and Portugal, where it is known as pão sovado or pão de calo.

Sobado bread was given to the soldiers because it can last weeks. It arrived in Normandy through the Kingdom of Navarre in the times of Charles II 'the Bad', who was married to Joan of France. It gave rise to Norman pain brié (also, pain de chapître, 'town hall bread'), which is very similar to candeal. Later, the Spanish Tercios brought sobado to France, Italy, Flanders, and other parts of Europe. Italian bakers adopted sobado and created new delicacies, such as coppia ferrarese. In the Maghreb, there is a bread derived from candeal called pain espagnole. Italian pan di Spagna ("Spanish bread") refers to the sponge cake, which according to tradition was made by a baker in Spain. The name has passed into Greek as pantespani (Παντεσπάνι) and into Turkish as pandispanya.

=== In the Americas ===
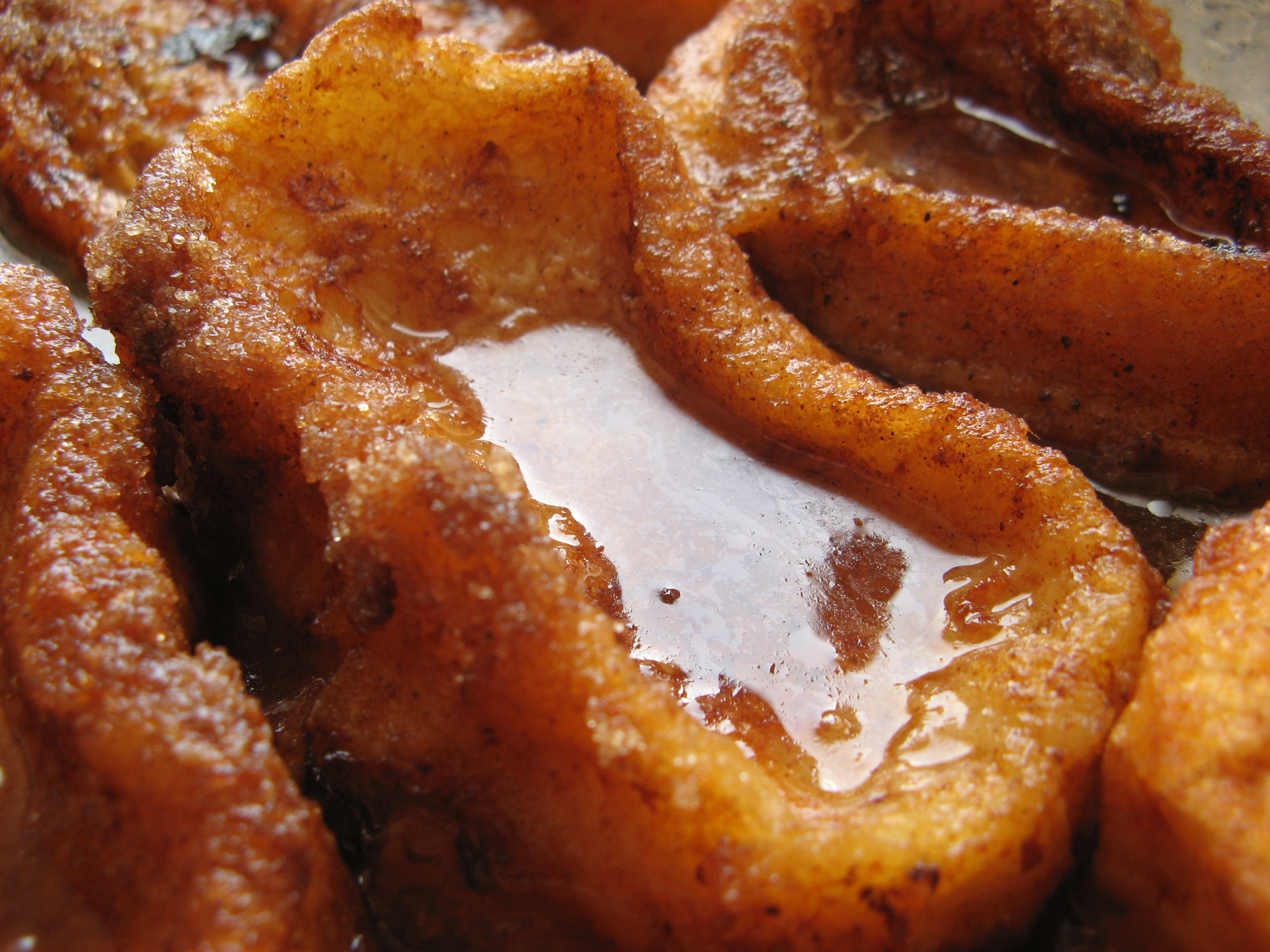
Torrijas are consumed at Easter throughout the Hispanosphere.

Wheat was one of the first foods exported to the New World, and bread was one of the first foods introduced by Spanish colonization into the diet of the natives. Massive cultivation of wheat in America was politically motivated, since the Spanish controlled the production, distribution, and sale of the product. Rejection of its cultivation manifested to resist Spanish rule. In Mesoamerica, Antonio de Mendoza denounced indigenous people who ignored wheat cultivation, because their techniques for planting corn (with a coa) were unsuitable for wheat. Even so, the culture of bread adapted to America, hand in hand with Evangelization.

Today, the Hispanic bakery is spread throughout the Americas, and bread is a common food, with variants across the region.

- Spanish torrijas are eaten in Argentina, Chile, Colombia, and Costa Rica, among other countries.
- The telera, one of the most common breads in Mexico, derives from the Spanish telera, traditionally produced in the Córdoba region and other parts of Spain, and brought over by Andalusian workers. There is also a telera in the Dominican Republic, typically eaten at Christmas.
- In Venezuela, bread is made with a liquid pre-ferment similar to sourdough called talvina, originally Spanish talvinas. The term comes from Andalusian Arabic التلبينة talbina (pronounced talbeenah), a liquid mass of milk and barley, similar to Roman puls. Pan andino or pan camaleón (Andean or chameleon bread), made with talvina, is popular in Venezuela.
- Bread of the dead was offered to deceased loved ones during All Saints' Day. This tradition is recorded in Europe and is known as pan de ánimas in Spain. Spanish settlers spread the custom, and pan de muerto is a typical preparation for the Mexican Day of the Dead. In the Andes of Bolivia and Peru, All Saints is known as "the Festival of Bread" because they are produced in large quantities, in the form of a human (t'antawawa), a dove (urpis), a snake, a fish, or other animals.
- In Colombia, almojábana is a very popular cheese bun, served as breakfast or snack. It comes from the Spanish almojábana (still prepared in Aragón, Valencia, Murcia and the Canary Islands). Its name comes from the Arabic المُجَبَّنة al-mujabbana, which means cheese bread. Most Spanish recipes lost the cheese in the dough, it is maintained in Colombia, Panama, Puerto Rico and Costa Rica.
- Mollete is named for the sponginess of its crumb (muelle means "soft, spongy"), due to a very hydrated dough. Today, molletes can be found in different variants in Bolivia, Cuba, Mexico, Honduras, or Guatemala.
- Acemita, known as "poor man's bread", was Spanish bread and considered low quality because it used wheat bran, sometimes mixed with some white flour to make acemite flour. Due to seseo, the term evolved to semita, a wide variety of breads from Honduras, Argentina, El Salvador, and different Mexican states.
- Another low-quality bread is pan bazo (from pan basso, or "low-class bread"), which has several derivatives in Spain and Mexico.
- American pan sobao comes from Spanish sobao or sobado bread.
- The Spanish jallulla, typical of the city of Granada and its surrounding areas, is the ancestor of the hallulla, a flat, round bread from Bolivia, Chile, Ecuador, and Peru, and of gayuya, from the Mexican state of Hidalgo.
- The Mexican bolillo is a derivative of the Sevillian bollo.

=== In the Philippines ===
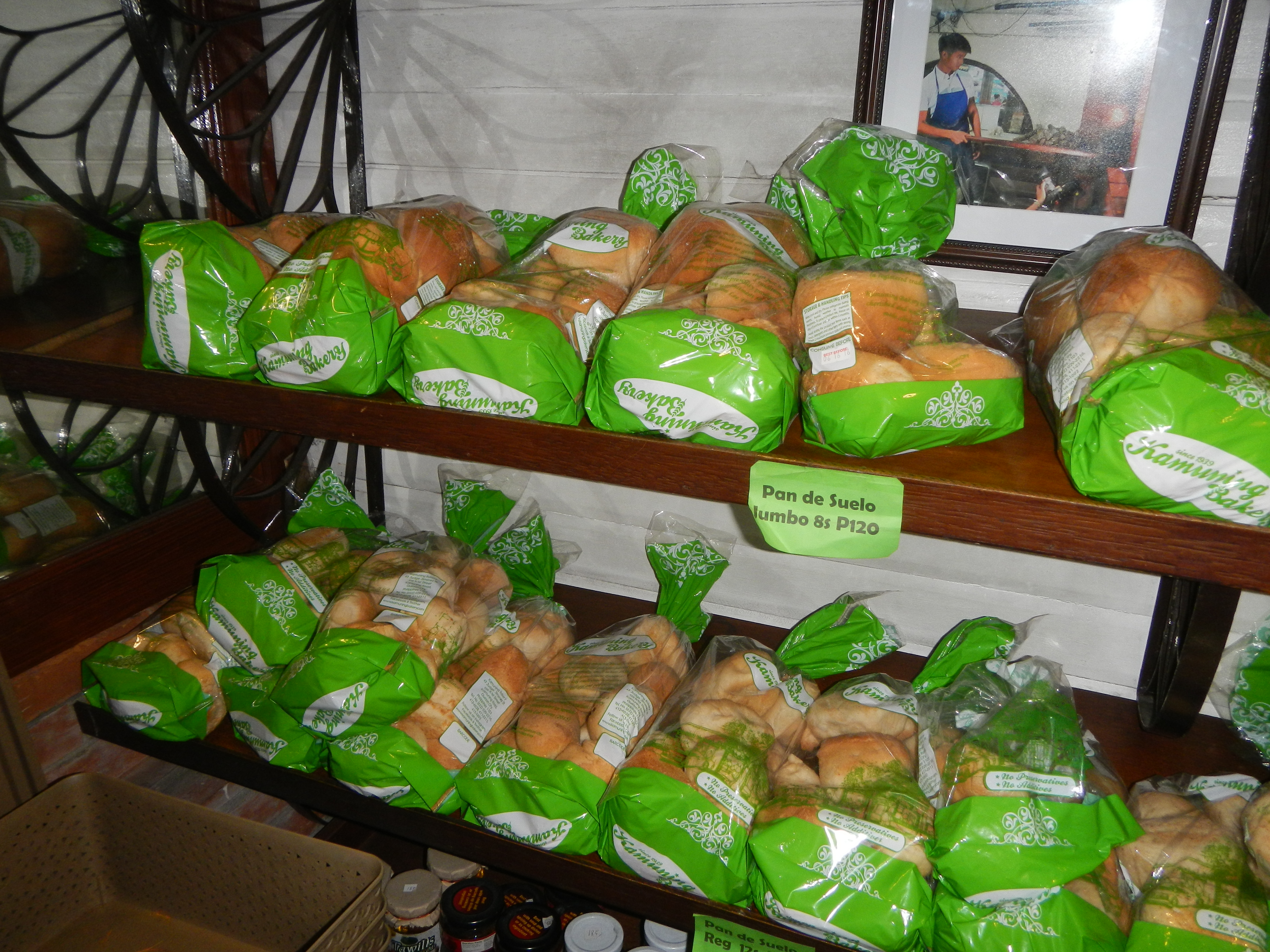
Pan de suelo (1939 Kamuning Bakery)

Kiln or oven (horno) baking bread came to the Philippines from Spain in the 16th century. In 1625, a royal bakery was established in Intramuros. It provided bread for Spanish settlers, pan nava, a very hard, long-lasting bread eaten by crews of Manila galleons, and sacramental bread for Spanish missionaries. The Spanish had a monopoly on bread production as wheat flour was imported from China and Japan. Baking spread to the local aristocracy's private households, and eventually to bakeries for common people.

Though nativized over the centuries, a few staple breads of the Philippines have Spanish origins, including pan de sal (from Spanish-Filipino baguette-like pan de suelo), ensaymada, and pan de monja. Other local breads have Spanish names but no counterparts in Spain, like pan de coco, pan de regla, pan de caña, and Spanish bread (a.k.a. "señorita bread").

== See also ==
- Bread in culture
- Bread in Europe
- History of bread
