= Telera =

Telera may refer to:

- Telera (Dominican bread), in Dominican Republic cuisine
- Sandwich rolls, or teleras, a Mexican sandwich bread
- Telera (Spanish bread), a shaped bread from Córdoba
- Telera, voice portal company integrated into Genesys in 2002
