= Bread of Alfacar =

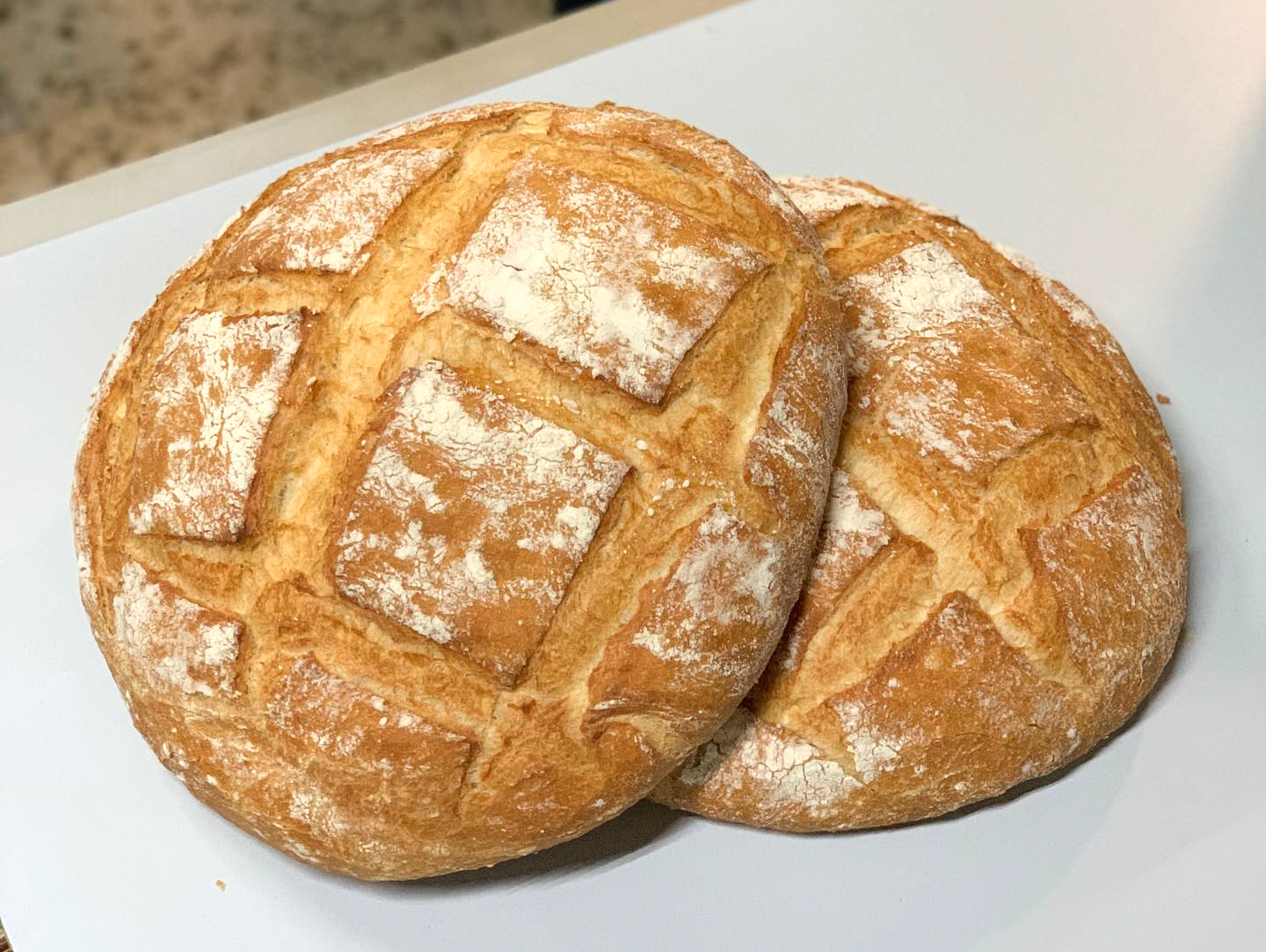
PGI Pan de Alfacar

Bread of Alfacar is a Protected Geographical Indication seal that protects and identifies the baking tradition of Alfacar, a town in the province of Granada (Spain). It contains wheat flour, sourdough, yeast, salt and water from the Alfacar spring. The Alfacar bread is produced in different formats (bollo, rosco, rosca and hogaza) from the same original dough. Its crumb is flexible, with a mild flavor, creamy white in color, with abundant and irregular pores. This bread is ideal to accompany typical dishes of the area such as setas fritas ('fried mushrooms'), alimoje con bacalao ('garlic and pepper sauce with cod') or choto al ajillo ('young goat stew').

The municipalities authorized for its production are Alfacar, a town of five and a half thousand inhabitants, and Víznar, with less than a thousand. Both are located at the foot of the La Alfaguara Mountain Range, about 5 km north of Granada. Alfacar and Víznar have historically been towns supplying bread to the city of Granada.

== History ==
=== Reconquista ===
Municipal coat of arms of Alfacar with a loaf.

The bakery industry in Alfacar and Víznar had its first boost from the demand of the new Christian settlers after the Reconquista, 're-conquest', of the Nasrid Kingdom by the Catholic Monarchs, at the end of the 15th century. After the Castilian conquest of the Granada kingdom, the Muslim population was increased by the Christian population. The war had decimated the supply capacity of the markets, which made it necessary to adopt measures aimed at guaranteeing food supply, including the supply of bread to the population of Granada capital, which undoubtedly had an important repercussion in the definitive establishment of the bakery industry in Alfacar and Víznar.

=== 20th century ===
As the geographer Bosque Laurel indicates, in 1950, Alfacar and Víznar dominate the manufacture of bread in the Granada area, constituting the most important supply enclave in Granada. At that time, it had 9 ovens and 41 bakers, working at night for Granada and during the day for local consumption. Around 1950, in the capital of Granada, 7,000 kg of Alfacar Bread of excellent quality and highly appreciated among consumers were being marketed daily.

In 1973, the bakers of Alfacar and Víznar formed a cooperative society based in Alfacar for the production and marketing of "Pan de Alfacar" in 15 offices that they established in Granada Capital, for which they had the support of the Provincial Cereals Union of Grenade. Most of these offices are currently open, in which, at that time, the name "Pan de Alfacar" was already mentioned on signs.

José Carlos Capel, in 1991, cites the roscos de Alfacar in his book El pan: elaboración, formas, mitos, ritos y gastronomía. Glosario de los panes de España. Rosco is one of the formats of the “Pan de Alfacar”, and presents its specific recipe and preparation method, being one of the genuine breads within Spanish cuisine.

=== Present ===
The reason for the expansion and consolidation of the bakery sector in Alfacar and Víznar is the notoriety of «Pan de Alfacar», a consolidated commercial reputation thanks to the specific characteristics of the product, as shown by a statistical study carried out at the level of the province of Granada.

In 2013, the Alfacar Bakers Guild submitted an application for the recognition of its bread as a Protected Geographical Indication, one of the quality regimes of the European Union, becoming one of the 16 Spanish bakery/pastry products that have this seal.

== Features ==
In order to be sold as "Bread of Alfacar", a bread must meet the criteria established by law regarding its ingredients, techniques, times, temperatures, etc.

The flour used is wheat, with a strength between W110 and 150. The water used comes from a limestone-dolomitic aquifer in the Sierra de Alfaguara. This spring supplies the public water network of Alfacar and Víznar, and is characterized by a medium-high hardness (20-25) and a medium-high pH (7.4 to 7.8). To ferment the dough, leftover dough from the previous day (mother dough) is used, and, if the baker considers it appropriate, fresh biological yeast (Saccharomyces cerevisiae).

These peculiarities provide a soft, cream-colored crumb bread with abundant and irregular honeycomb. As well as a thick crust (by law, more than one and a half centimeters), slightly shiny and golden, but not floured.

The ovens that produce Alfacar bread must meet certain requirements and be authorized by the Certification Entity.

== Types ==
Alfacar bread is presented in the following formats:

- Bollo, elongated, with pointed ends called "tits" and a single longitudinal streak (80, 125 and 250 g)
- Rosco, 250 g pieces with an elliptical shape with a flattened tubular section and axial asymmetry. A single longitudinal rib
- Rosca, 500 g pieces with a circular shape with a tubular section, with a certain axial symmetry. They are recognized by their hand attachment point called "mother-in-law".
- Hogaza, loaves are pieces whose weight can be 250 g, 500 g or 1 kg. They are almost perfectly round in shape and slightly domed at the top. They are recognizable in their upper part by presenting a marking or "pintao" in the form of a grid within a frame of four perpendicular cuts.

== Bread of Alfacar in literature ==
In 2008, a monographic publication on «Pan de Alfacar» – «El pan de Alfacar»: bakeries and traditional ovens (Reyes Mesa, JM et al.) – endorses the history of this product from the s. XVI to XXI. Different historical-geographical publications and cadastral studies endorse the importance of the Alfacar sector and its commercialization in the capital of Granada and its surroundings, the most important are: Book of Survey and Distribution of Alfacar of 1571 and of Víznar in 1572 after the reconquest of Granada, Tomás López and Vargas Machuca in the publication Geographical Dictionary of Malaga and Granada (Manuscript of 1795, National Library in Madrid), Cadastre of the Marquis of Ensenada published in 1752, F. Heríquez de Jonquera (1987) in the publication Anales de Granada : description of the kingdom of Granada and city of Granada, chronicle of the Reconquest (1482-1492), events of the years 1588-1646. Pascual Madoz, between 1835 and 1839, in his Geographical Dictionary counts in Alfacar 12 ovens and 17 mills that consumed 300 fanegas of wheat daily. The approximate 19,000 kg of wheat that the Alfacar mills could grind per day meant a volume of flour that would not only supply the Alfacar ovens, but would also produce a significant amount of flour for distribution in Granada, which would translate into a trade parallel of flour and «Pan de Alfacar» in the capital and surroundings.

== See also ==
- Telera cordobesa, another bread of Andalusia
- Bread culture in Spain
