= Sevillian bollo =

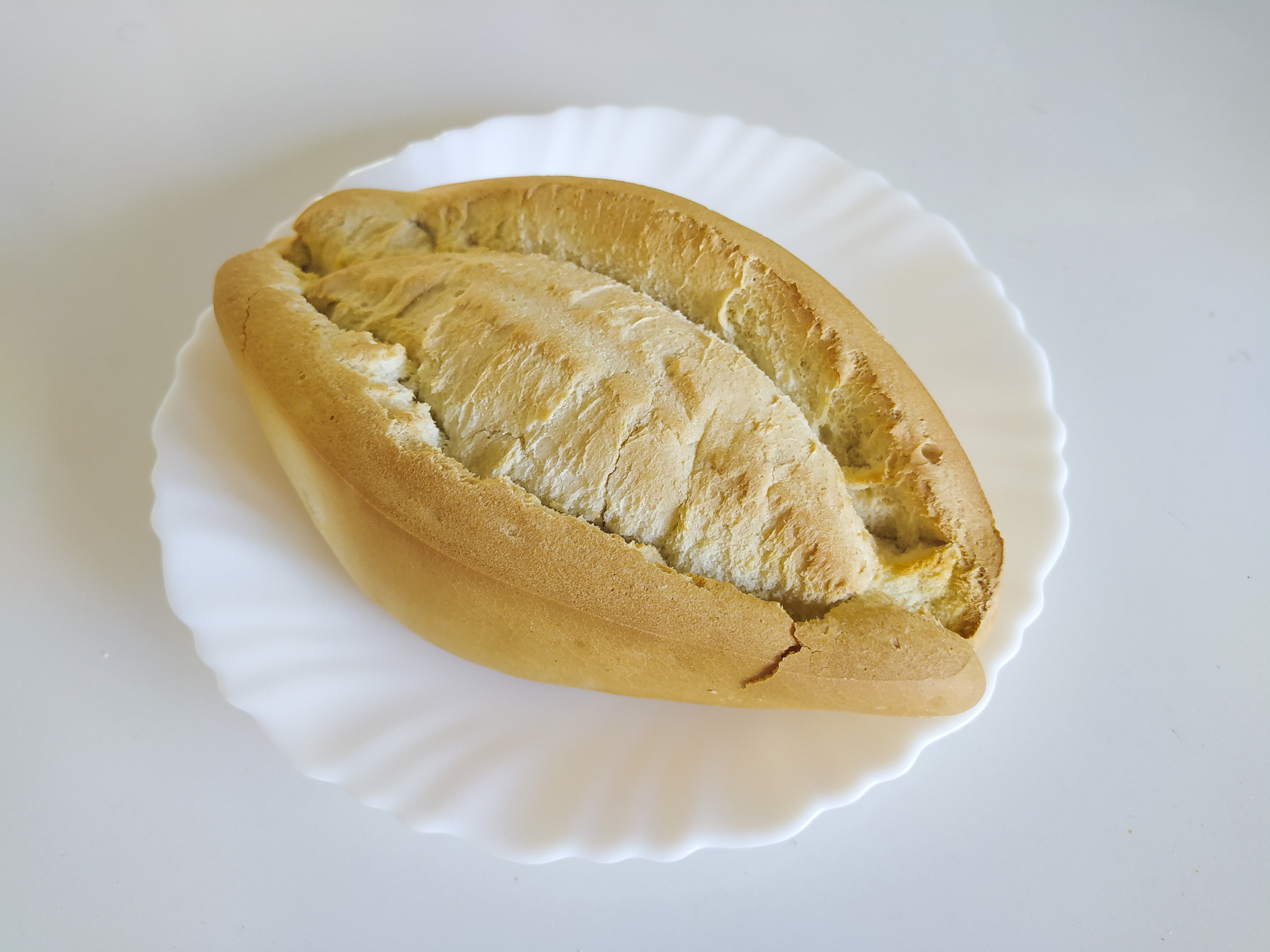
Sevillian bollo

Bollo (Spanish pronunciation: [boʝo]) is a popular bread in Seville, in the south of Spain. It is a white bread, with thin crust and bregada dough, which results in a spongy but compact crumb. Each unit weighs between 150 and 200 gr, and is about 20 cm long. Traditional scoring consists of a single longitudinal cut. It is a derivative of Castilian candeal bread. It is consumed in the Seville area and across western Andalusia. Bollo is a classic among the breads produced in Alcalá de Guadaíra, a city with a great baking tradition.

The candeal, bregado or sobado is a traditional bread from Spain. Their names refer to the dough sheeting process (sobar or bregar la masa, "to knead strongly the dough"). It contains flour, water, sourdough, salt and a little yeast. The dough is made with the help of a machine with two cylinders called sobadora or bregadora. By means of this technique, a harder, malleable and homogeneous mass is left, and with a low percentage of water. The fermentation process is short so that the crumb remains tight. Two variants of the bollo are telera, whose central part is higher, and albarda, which is basically a bollo without peaks.

Bollo and picos is a combination that accompanies most dishes in the Andalusian cuisine. It is also the typical bread with which montaditos are prepared, and can be found in the traditional Andalusian breakfast. In addition, bollo is used to prepare torrijas during Holy Week.

== See also ==
- Bread culture in Spain
- Pan gallego (Galician bread)
