= Gramola (kneader) =

Kneading device for making bread or pasta

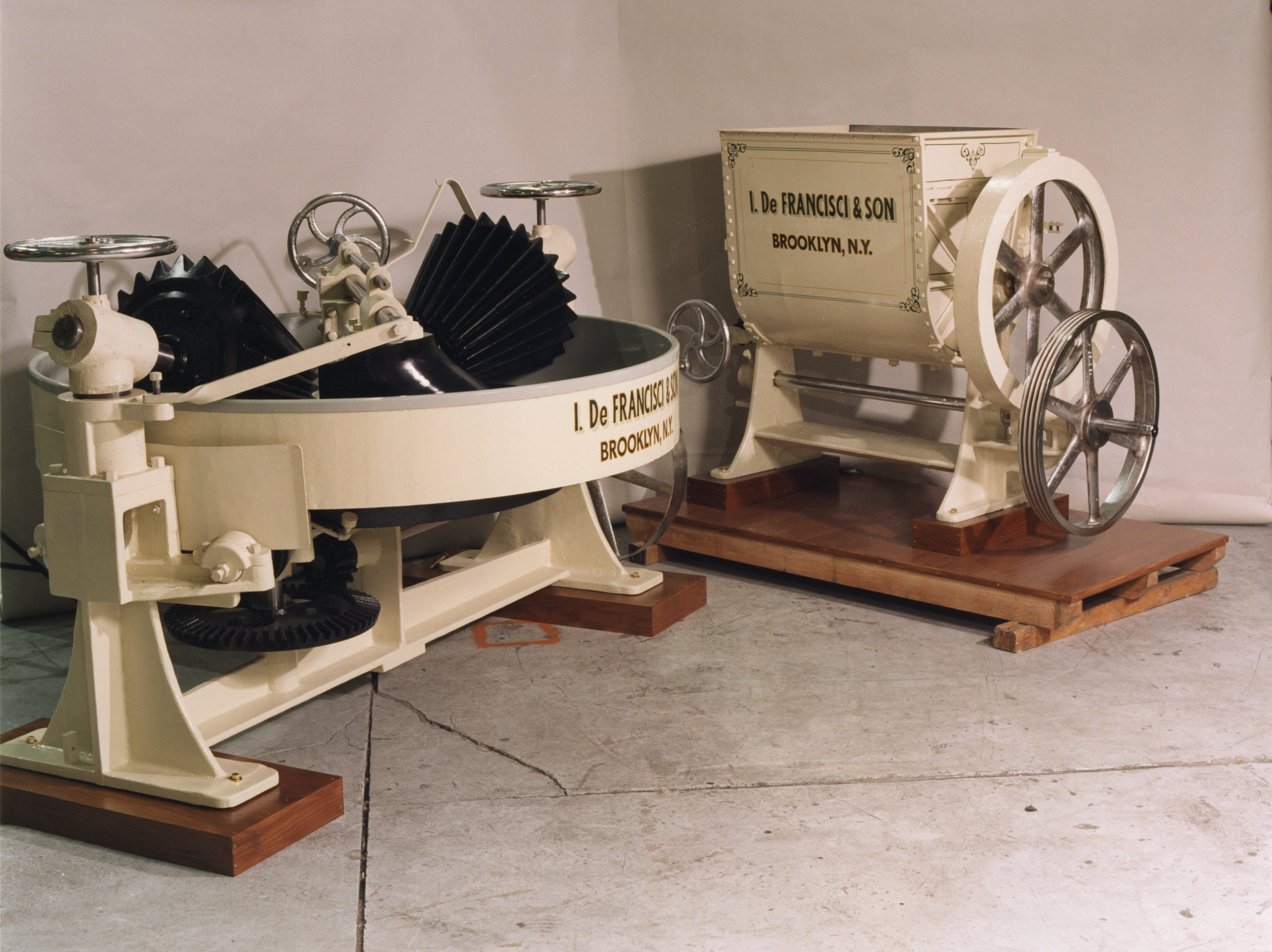
Gramola (left) and mixer (right)

A Gramola is a kneading tool or machine used when making bread or pasta.

A mechanical gramola machine was commonly used starting in the late 1800s during the Second Industrial Revolution in food factories using batch production. After semolina or flour was mixed with water, the gramola was used to knead the dough. Food factories phased out the use of gramolas as high capacity processing lines became more prevalent with the advent of continuous production.

== Pasta production ==
The mechanical gramola machines prevalent in pasta factories in the early 1900s used giant rollers, usually with a fluted surface, for kneading by pressing on the dough as it passed under the rollers. After kneading in the gramola, the dough was ready for forming into pasta using a press with a die for extruded products, such as spaghetti or macaroni, or a sheetformer for slit products such as noodles or filled products such as ravioli.

== See also ==
- Gramolatrice (Italian)
