= Easter mona =

Spanish cake

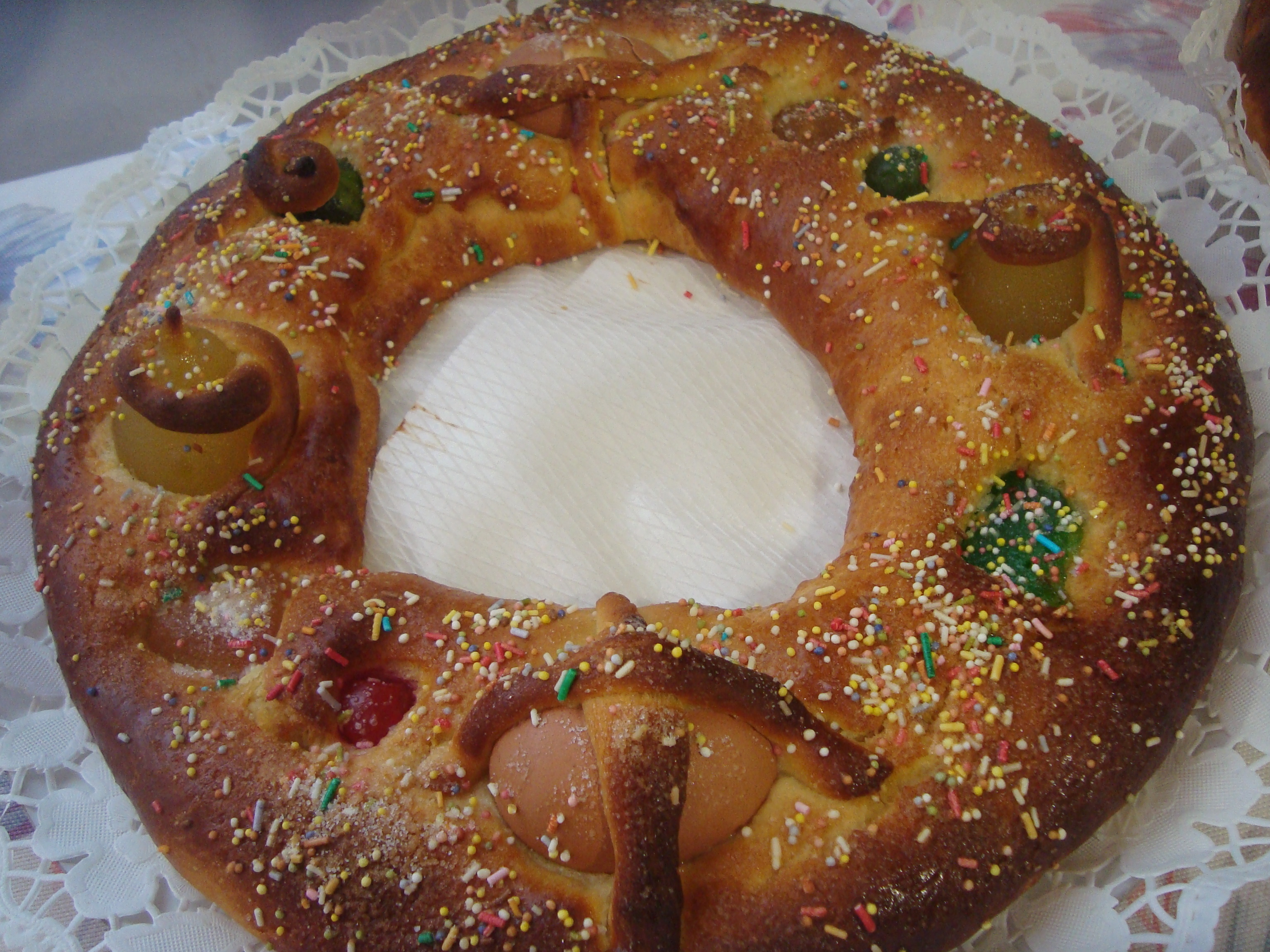
Traditional Easter mona

The Easter mona (Spanish: Mona de Pascua; Catalan: Mona de Pasqua) is a kind of cake that is specially eaten on Easter Sunday or Easter Monday in the Spanish regions of Catalonia, Valencia and Murcia.

== Origins ==
It is related to similar traditional Easter traditions in Spain and Europe.

The first mention of a sweet mona date back to the 15th century incunable Trobes en lahors de la Verge Maria, and in 1783 the Royal Spanish Academy defined it as: "Valencia and Murcia. Cake baked with eggs in their shell at Easter, known in other parts of the Iberian Peninsula as Hornazo". There are several hypotheses about the origin of the term:

- Munda: in the Latin plural of mundum, banners offered by the Romans to Ceres during April, containing candy and decorating.
- Muna: in ancient Arabic منى, a land tax in the form of an offering of cakes, boiled eggs or other agricultural products, literally meaning "gift" or "provision of the mouth".
- Munichia: celebration dedicated to Artemis in ancient Greece.

The tradition is also traced back to feasts that Roman shepherds celebrated with cakes or the Beltane, a Celtic festival that was celebrated in the month of May and where pastries with eggs were consumed.

== Production and varieties ==
Traditionally, the Easter mona has been a round cake like made with a hard-boiled eggs on top cooked along with the mona, but nowadays, in most parts of Catalonia the eggs have been replaced by chocolate eggs or figures till became the focus of the mona. However, in Valencia and Murcia the traditional recipe has not changed and even there are places where the monas are typical all year, without the hard-boiled egg on it, often under different names such as tonya, panou, pa socarrat, panquemado or coca bova, among other alternatives.

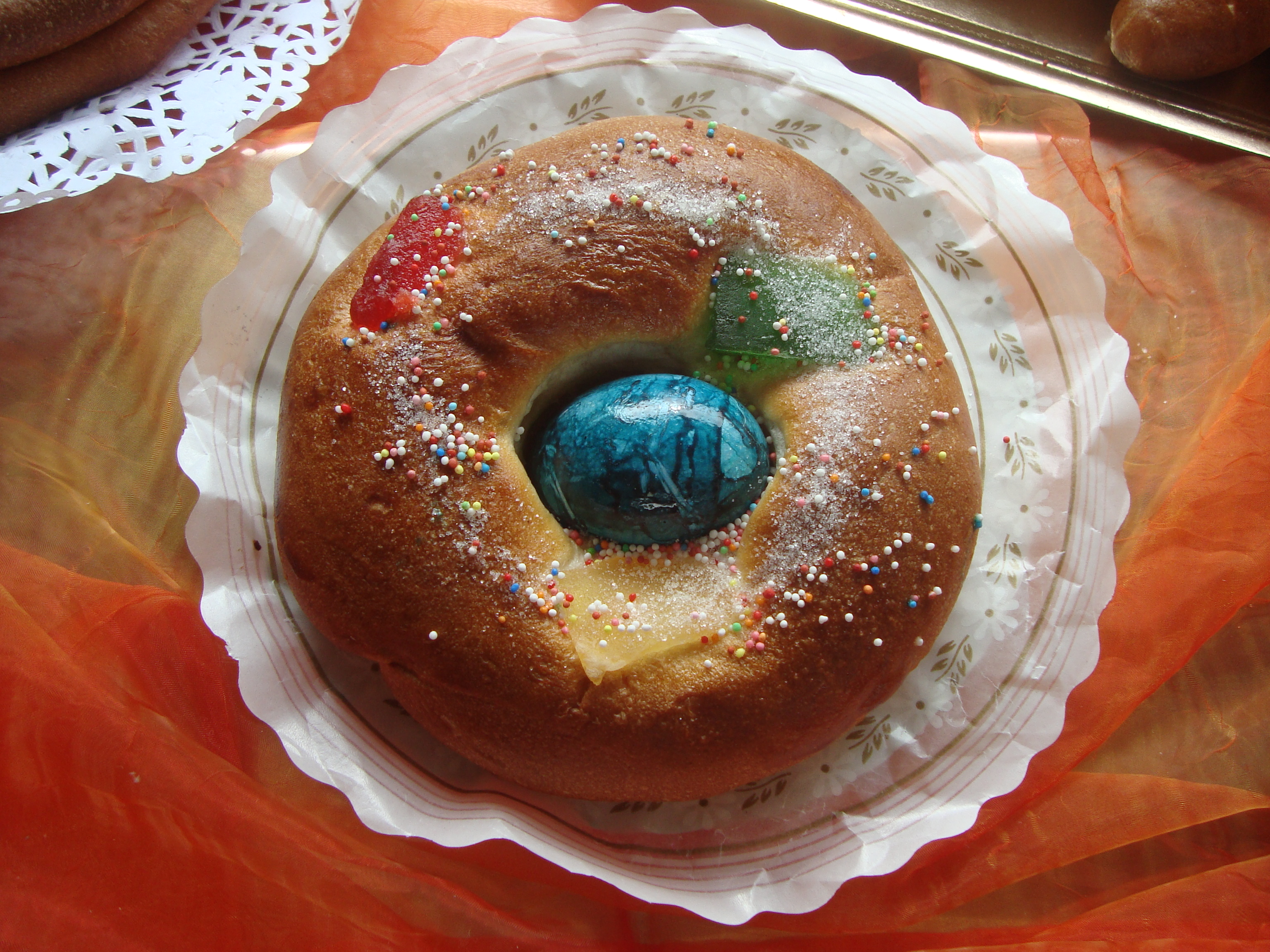
Common Valencian Easter mona

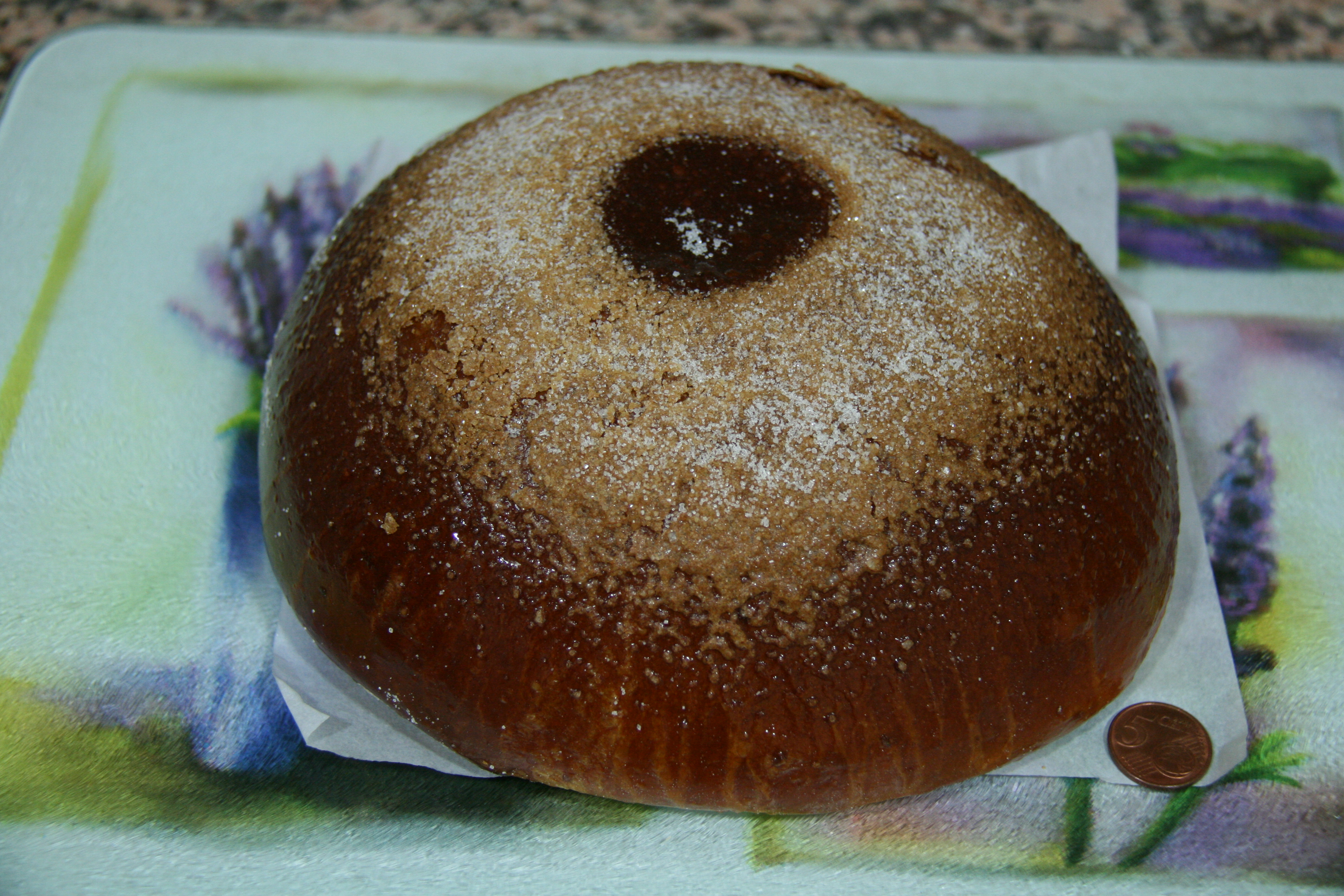
Panou or all year round mona

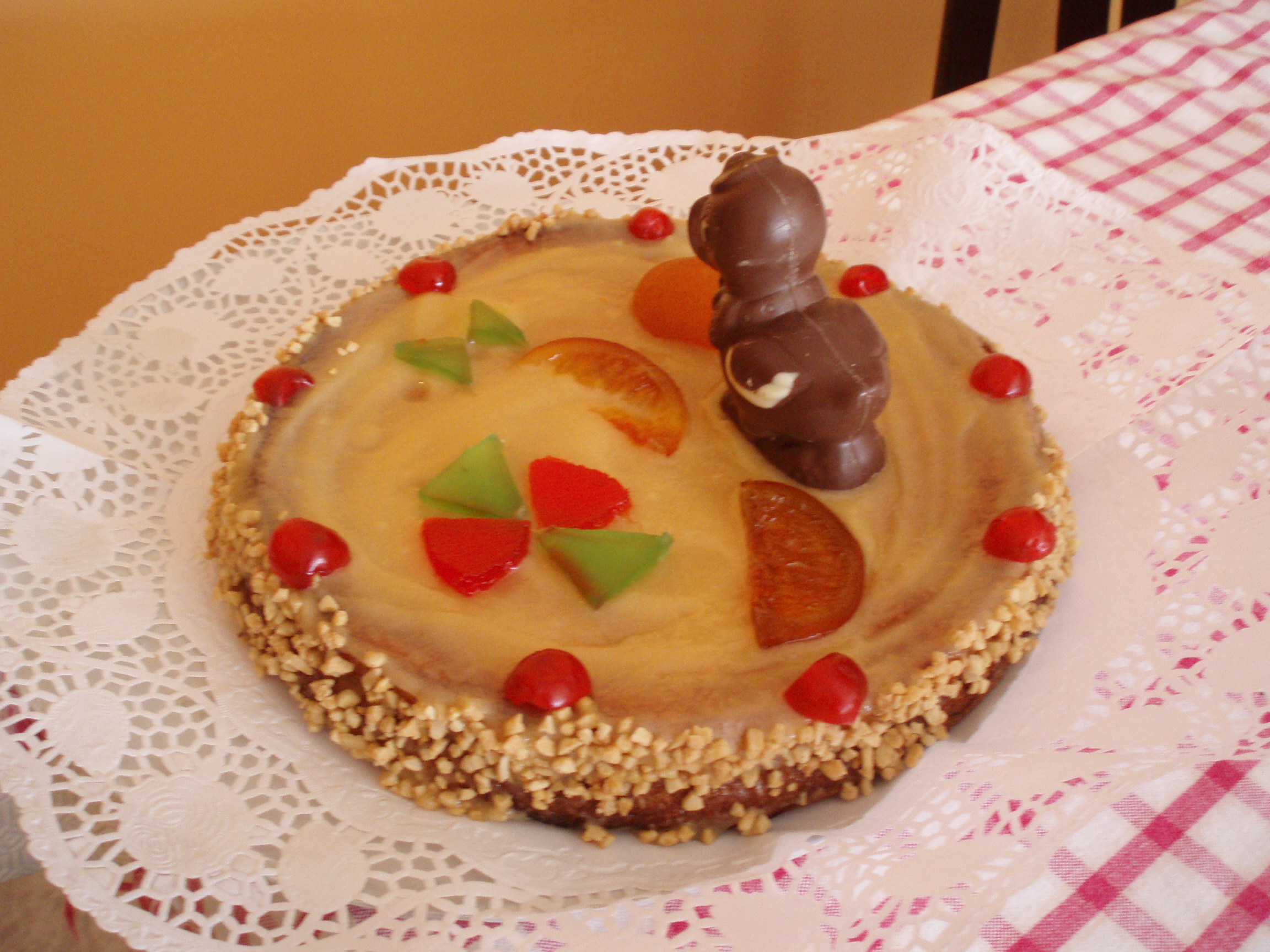
Common Easter mona in Catalonia

== Tradition ==
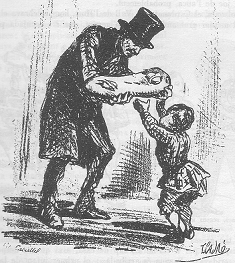
Godfather giving the Easter mona to his godson

In almost all Catalonia and Valencia, it is customary for godparents to give the mona to their godchild on Easter Sunday. On Easter Monday, families or groups of friends gather together and go somewhere, especially the countryside, to eat the mona. Traditionally, the age of the children was reflected in the number of eggs in the mona, until they were 12 years old. Currently, it is common for godparents to give the mona to their godchildren throughout their lives.

The Easter mona tradition is tied to that of bakers, who make works of art with pastry and chocolate, and since the mid-nineteenth century, mones have lost their initial simplicity, making their presentation more complex, for they must be elaborated with caramelized sugar, sugar almonds, jams, crunchy toppings, or silver anise, before being decorated with painted Easter eggs or figures made from porcelain, wood, cardboard or fabric.

== See also ==
- Hornazo
- Tsoureki
- Easter egg
