= Pan sobao =

Caribbean white bread

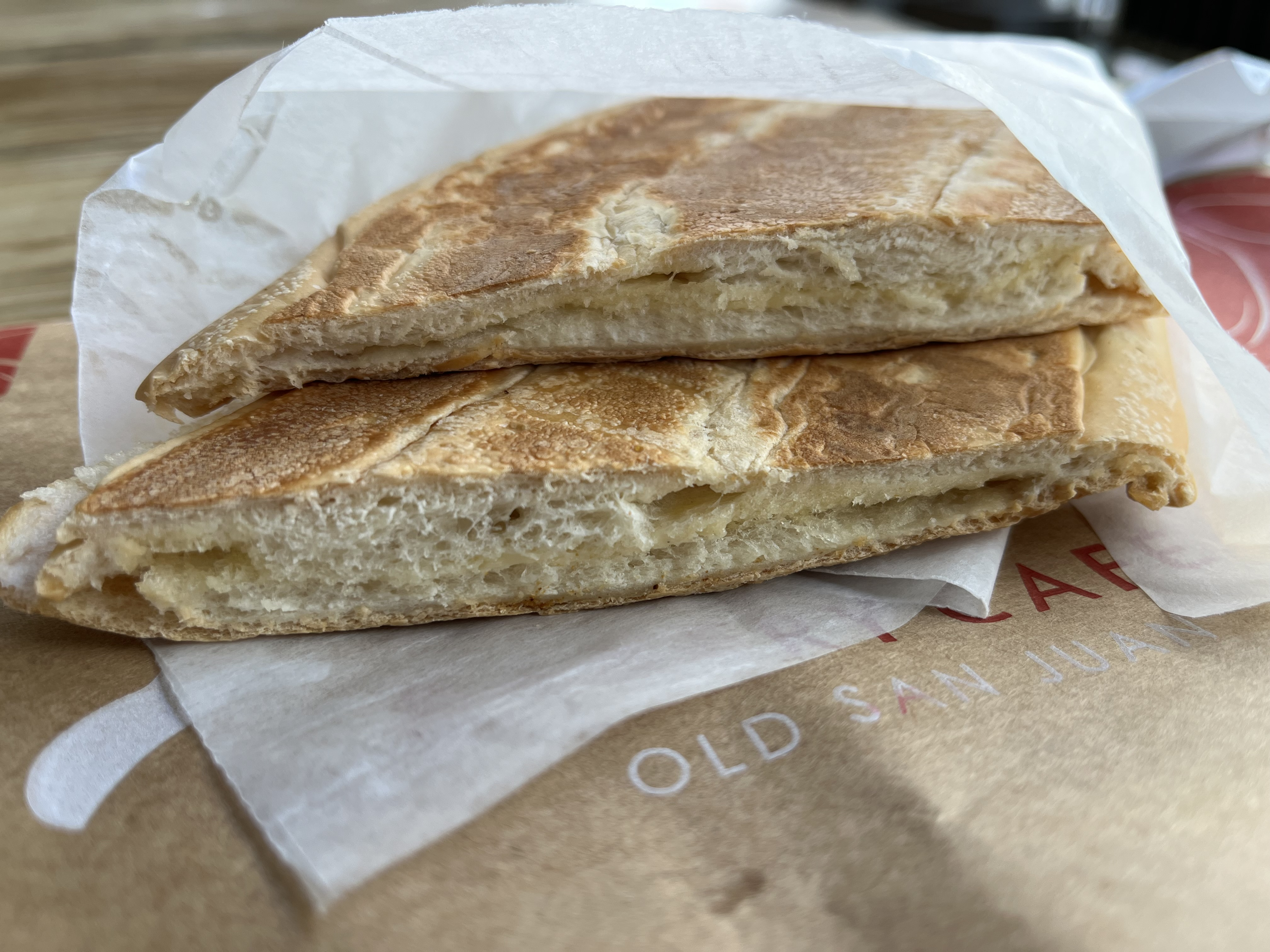
- Pan sobao
- Alternative names: Pan sobado
- Type: Bread
- Course: Breakfast, snack
- Place of origin: Caribbean
- Region or state: Puerto Rico, Dominican Republic, Venezuela
- Created by: Traditional
- Serving temperature: Room temperature
- Main ingredients: Flour, water, lard, sugar, yeast

Pan sobao, is a white bread from the Caribbean. In Puerto Rico it is characterized by the addition of lard, which gives it its distinctive flavor. In the Dominican Republic and Venezuela pan sobao is made with butter not lard with addition of eggs and milk. It is one of the most traditional breads of Puerto Rico, where it is considered a softer variant of pan de agua. In Venezuela, pan sobao enjoyed great popularity in the mid-20th century and is now typical in some rural towns.

== See also ==
- Telera, a traditional Dominican Christmas bread
