= Galician bread =

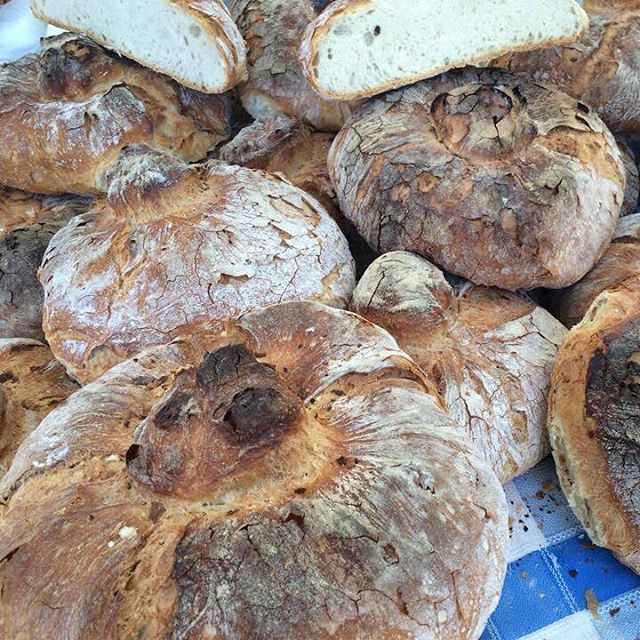
PGI Pan de Galicia

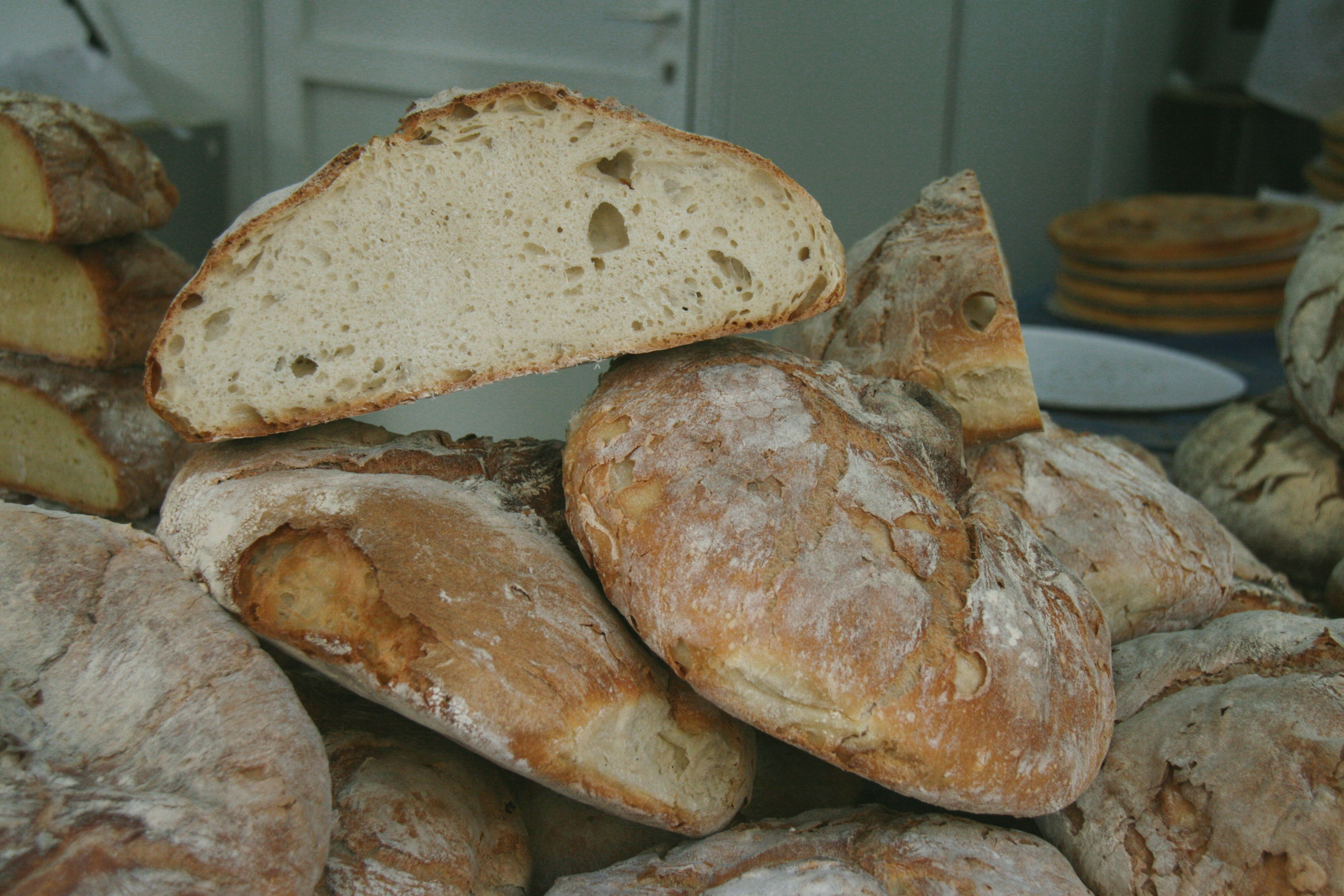
Wheat bread from Galicia

Galician bread (pan galego in Galician, pan gallego in Spanish) is the bread that is traditionally produced in the autonomous community of Galicia, in northern Spain, recognized as a Protected Geographical Indication (PGI) since December 20, 2019. It contains soft wheat flour native to Galicia, called "trigo do país" (country wheat), mixed with foreign wheat flour, traditionally from Castille (Triticum aestivum), in addition to water, sourdough, yeast (Saccharomyces cerevisiae) and salt. It is characterized by high hydration, which gives it a spongy crumb with abundant irregular pores and a pale cream to dark white color. In addition, it has an intense and slightly acidic flavor, thanks to a prolonged fermentation time. Its crust is floured, aromatic, very crisp, and golden to dark brown in color.

It is one of the most appreciated breads in Spain due to its high quality.

== Characteristics ==
Due to its type of dough, it is classified in the category of panes de flama ('flama breads', meaning soft dough breads). Unlike the more typical sobado breads of Castile and the South, the Galician breads have a more toasted crust and a greater amount of water in their dough. The addition of water is done very progressively until reaching high percentages of hydration, sometimes up to 90%; that is, 90 g of water for every 100 g of flour. The resulting dough is very liquid and difficult to handle, so it is not a recipe suitable for novice bakers.

The rest time of the pre-ferment can be between 5 and 7 hours. The rest times in the block of the dough, the manual shaping and the firing on refractory stone are also factors that determine its organoleptic properties.

== Diffusion ==
Galician bread has such a wide production area, which covers the entire Autonomous Community of Galicia. However, not all the bread made in this region can be listed under the PGI Galician Bread protection, since it must meet production criteria set by law. In 2020, it was estimated that only 10% of the inhabitants of Galicia regularly consume Galician bread.

== Bread formats ==
The different forms of Galician bread are standardized as follows:

- The barra is between 40 and 60 cm long and weighs 300 g.
- The bola or torta has a flattened and round shape, and a variable weight of 250 or 500 g, 1 kg or even more. Depending on the place it is called by either name, and traditionally they are cooked before bolo.
- The bolo or fogaza has a round and irregular shape, more or less the same length as width, and on top it can be finished with a kind of bow or scored. The weight varies between 250 or 500 g, 1 kg, 1.5 kg or even more. There are also longer forms.
- The rosca has an irregular flattened ring shape, with a variable weight of 250 or 500 g, 1 kg or even more.

== See also ==
- Bread culture in Spain
- Bollo sevillano (Sevillian bollo)
