= Talbina =

Porridge made from barley flour

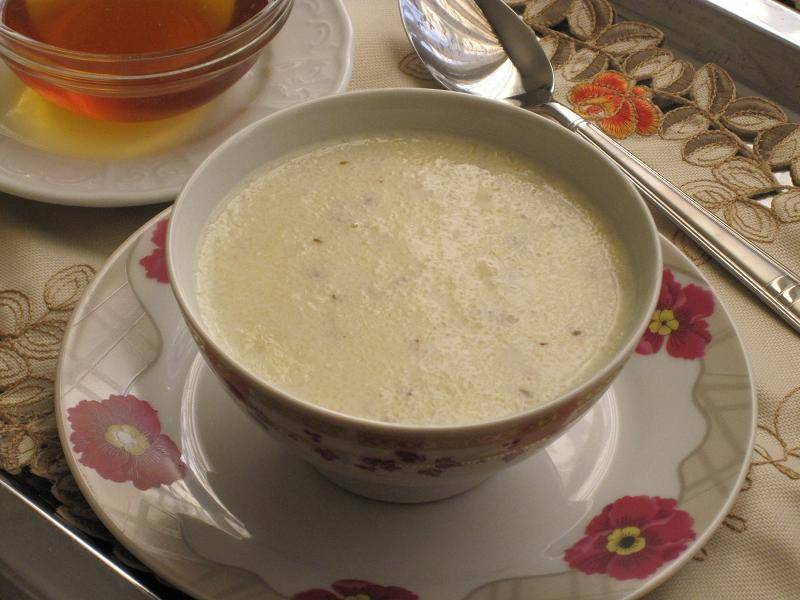
- A bowl of talbina
- Type: Porridge
- Place of origin: Arabian Peninsula
- Region or state: Middle East
- Serving temperature: Hot
- Main ingredients: Milk, barley and honey

Talbina is a porridge made from barley flour, formed by adding milk and honey to the dried barley powder. The name comes from the Arabic word laban meaning milk, because of its resemblance to milk, as it is soft and white.

== Nutrition ==
Barley is a good source of insoluble and soluble dietary fiber. The soluble fiber portion contains the richest source of beta-glucans compared to any other grain; these can aid immune function. Barley also contains B vitamins, iron, magnesium, zinc, phosphorus, and copper, and is one of the richest sources of chromium, which is important in maintaining blood glucose levels. Talbina, particularly its barley and honey components, is rich in antioxidants and contains a high concentration of tocols and tocotrienols, oils that help reduce the risk of cancer and heart disease.. Barley has been cited as a possible food to increase tryptophan, and thus serotonin in the body.

== Cultural significance ==
Ibn Sina, in his 11th-century work The Canon of Medicine, wrote of the healing effects of barley water, soup and broth for fevers.

== Religious significance ==
=== Islam ===
It was recommended by Muhammad and is generally considered "prophetic medicine".

A hadith concerning it says: 'A'isha the wife of Allah's Apostle said: "When there was any bereavement in her family the women gathered there for condolence and they departed except the members of the family and some selected persons. She asked to prepare talbina in a small couldron and it was cooked and then tharid was prepared and it was poured over talbina, then she said: Eat it, for I heard Allah's Messenger (may peace be upon him) as saying: Talbina gives comfort to the aggrieved heart and it lessens grief."

== See also ==
- Suji ka halwa
- Tsampa
- Tusha shinni
