= Hallulla =

South American bread

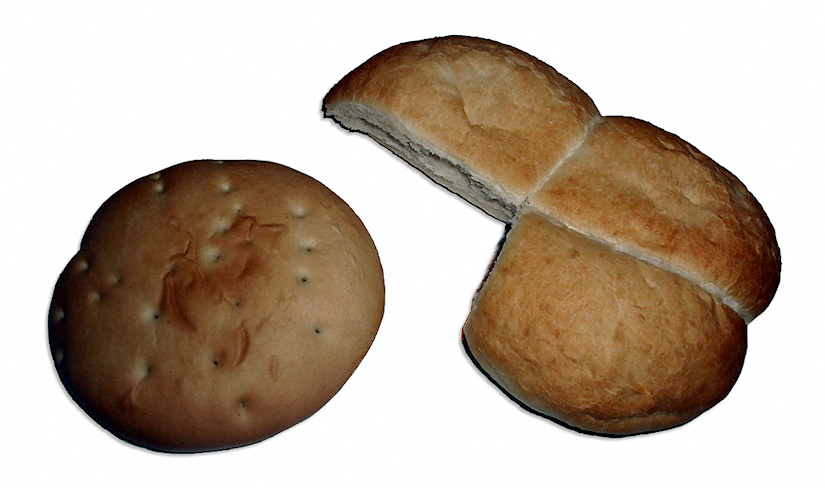
- Hallula (left) and marraqueta (right)
- Type: Bread
- Place of origin: Chile; Bolivia
- Main ingredients: Wheat flour, yeast, vegetable shortening or butter

Hallulla (Spanish: [aˈʎuʎa]; from Hebrew challah) is a popular bread in Chile and Bolivia. The hallulla is a flat round bread baked with vegetable (but sometimes also animal) shortening and is used for several traditional sandwiches.

The traditional recipe includes wheat flour, yeast, sugar, salt, vegetable shortening, milk and water.

== See also ==
- Elevenses
