= Sandwich roll =

Type of Mexican bread

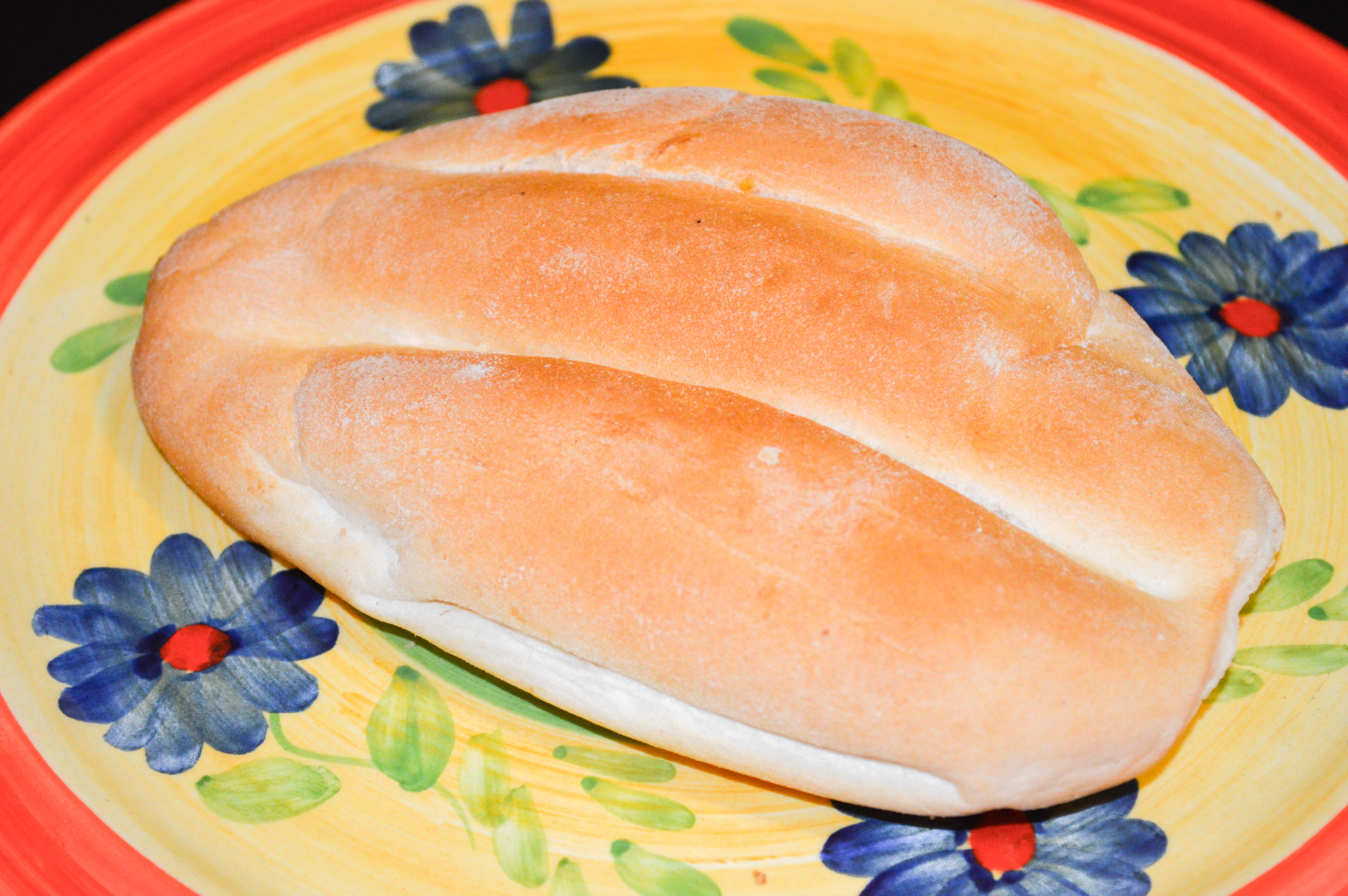
- A Mexican sandwich roll or telera from Colonia Asturias in Mexico City
- Alternative names: Telera; Mexican sandwich roll
- Type: Bread roll
- Place of origin: Mexico
- Region or state: Mexico and Central America
- Main ingredients: Flour, yeast

Sandwich rolls (Spanish: telera), often referred as teleras or Mexican sandwich rolls, are a type of white bread usually made from wheat flour, yeast, water and salt, used in various Mexican sandwiches.

== Etymology and terms ==
A crusty French-style sandwich roll is often called a birote, and this form of sandwich roll is typically found in Jalisco. The word telera comes from a similar bread from Andalusia. The term telera also means a either a plow pin or a corral and comes from Vulgar Latin *tēlāria. A tortero is one who is in charge of a sandwich roll.

== See also ==
- Telera (Spanish bread)
- List of breads
