= Hornazo =

Spanish meat pie

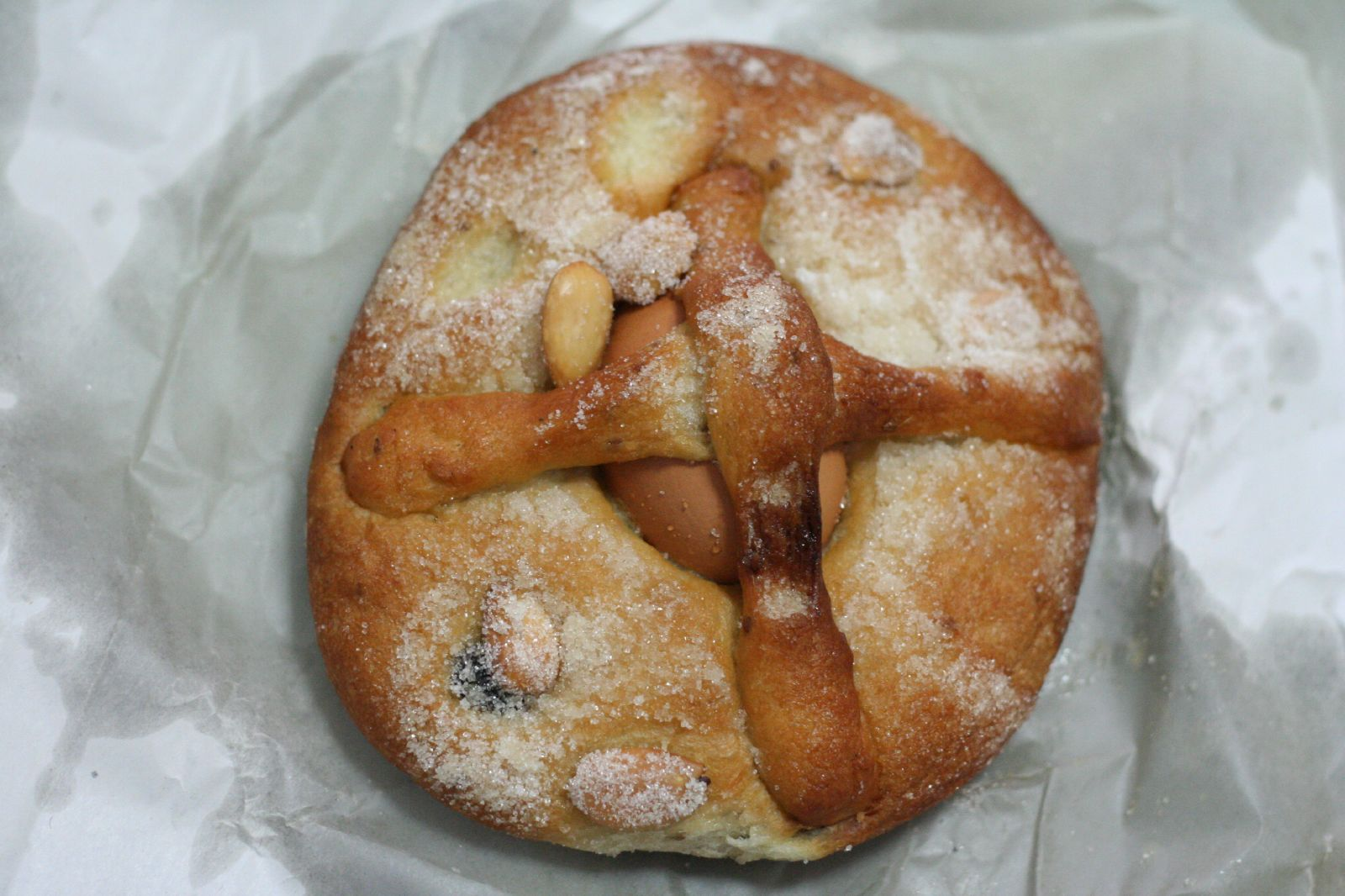
- Type: Meat pie
- Place of origin: Spain
- Region or state: Salamanca and Ávila
- Main ingredients: Flour, yeast, pork, hard-boiled eggs.

Hornazo (Spanish: [oɾˈnaθo]) is a Spanish meat pie eaten in the provinces of Salamanca and Ávila. It is made with flour and yeast and stuffed with pork loin, spicy chorizo, and hard-boiled eggs.

In Salamanca, it is traditionally eaten in the field during the "Monday of the Waters" (Lunes de aguas) festival. The name of this unique festival supposedly comes from a twisting of the word enagua ("petticoat"), which the prostitutes of the town used to wear under their dresses. According to tradition, during Lent the prostitutes were sent to the other side of the Tormes River so that the men of the town were not distracted during the religious observances. On Easter Monday, the students of the town threw a party on the banks of the river to celebrate the return of the women, and ate hornazo as part of the celebration.

== Hornazo in other parts of Spain ==
In other places in the country there are dishes similar to hornazo that contain hard-boiled eggs as a primary ingredient. In some parts of Spain a bollo de hornazo is a sweet and dry bread which is decorated with hard-boiled eggs. These dishes are also traditionally consumed in and around Easter. This may be because long ago, eggs were considered a sort of meat, and were therefore prohibited during Lent, a fact that did not stop the chickens from laying eggs. The eggs were preserved by hard-boiling them, and then used for cooking in dishes like hornazo. From this tradition it is probable that Easter eggs came into being, but their exact origins are unknown.

== See also ==
- List of Spanish dishes
