= Dough sheeting =

Food preparation method

Dough sheeting technology is used by bakeries, restaurants and other companies in the food industry, and rolls out dough into a consistent dough sheet with a desired even dough thickness. It can be used for dough lamination as well.

== Process ==
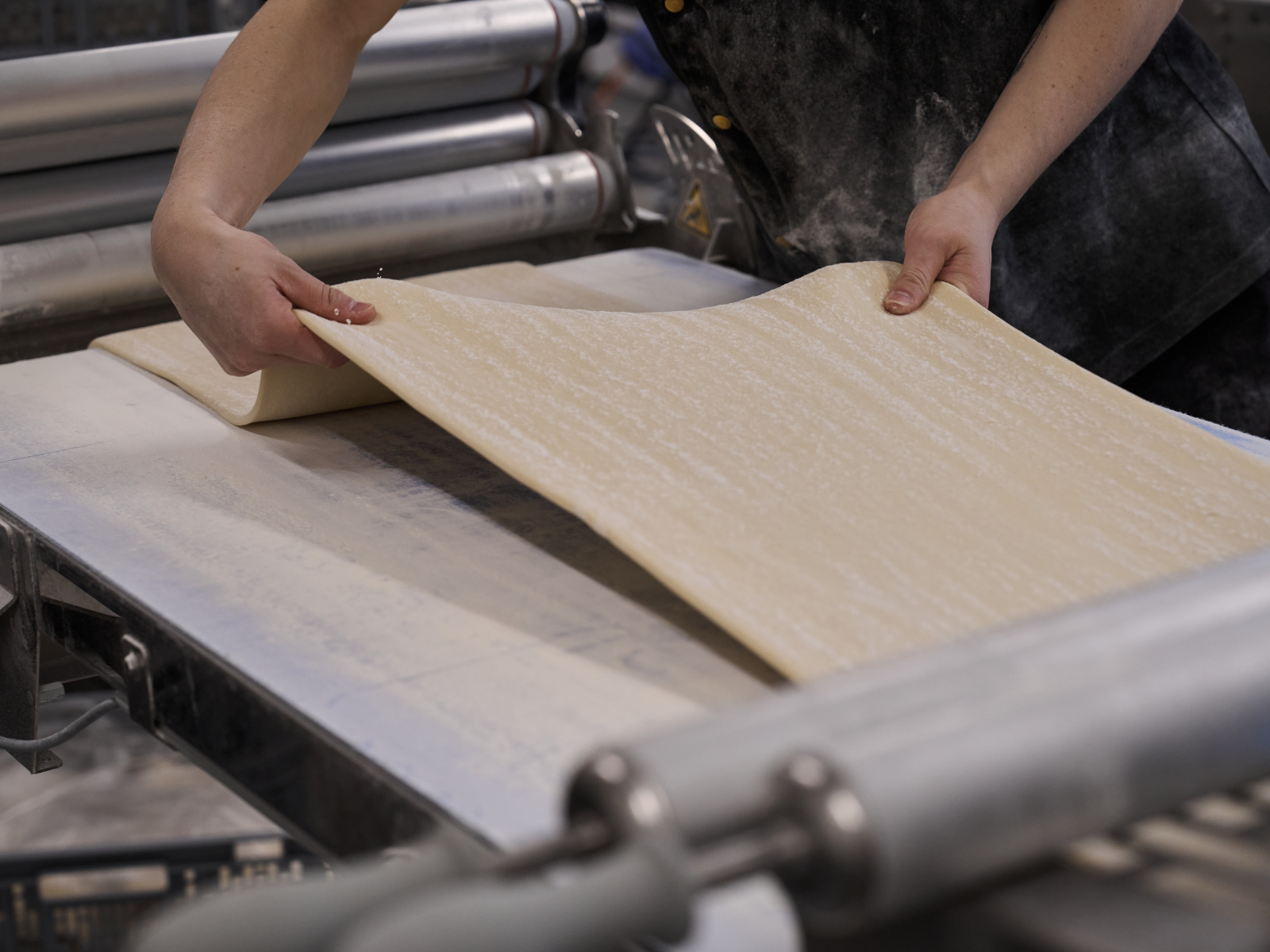
Baker using a dough sheeter

Dough is compressed between two or more rotating rollers. When done the right way, a smooth and consistent dough sheet is produced. The dough then passes one or several gauging rollers (mostly on conveyors) that reduce the dough to the required thickness. After this the dough sheet is shaped into a desired dough product. This technology is mainly used in industrial production machines for industrial bakeries and the food industry. Most dough sheeters can handle a wide variety of dough depending on the machine manufacturer. Most commonly dough sheeting technology is used for the production of laminated dough products like croissants and pastries, but it is also suitable for the production of bread, flatbread and pizza.. In addition, a dough sheeter can be used for sheeting marzipan, butter or margarine in preparation of the lamination process.

== Benefits ==
A big benefit for using sheeting technology is the large dough capacity that can be handled instead of working manually. Another benefit is that sheeting makes it possible to handle a great variety of dough types which traditional dough production systems can't handle, for example strongly hydrated wet and sticky ciabatta dough, as well as gluten free types of dough.

Modern dough sheeters can sheet dough without tearing the dough, bursting gas cells or damaging the gluten network at scale. This heavily influences the quality of the end product.

Mechanical dough sheeters usually are more robust than their electric counterparts but have to be operated manually. Electric dough sheeters support bakers in dough sheeting and laminating with automated process steps, such as automated flour dusting, firmness detection and dough reeling.

== History ==
The first US patent for a dough sheeter was filed by Anetsburger Brothers in 1941, which belongs to Middleby today. Subsequent patents for similar inventions, such as the reversible dough sheeter, were filed by Gustav A. Seewer, the founder of Rondo Burgdorf, in 1954 and 1959, respectively.

The origin of the dough sheeting process is not specifically traced back to at least 1977 in the case of Rademaker BV, who may be considered to be one of the earliest dough sheeting technology specialists.

Croissants and puff pastry were first products to have been produced with dough sheeting technology. Nowadays the bakery industry sees a trend that also includes the production of bread, flatbread and pizza products being produced with sheeting technology.
