= Telera (Spanish bread) =

Type of Spanish bread

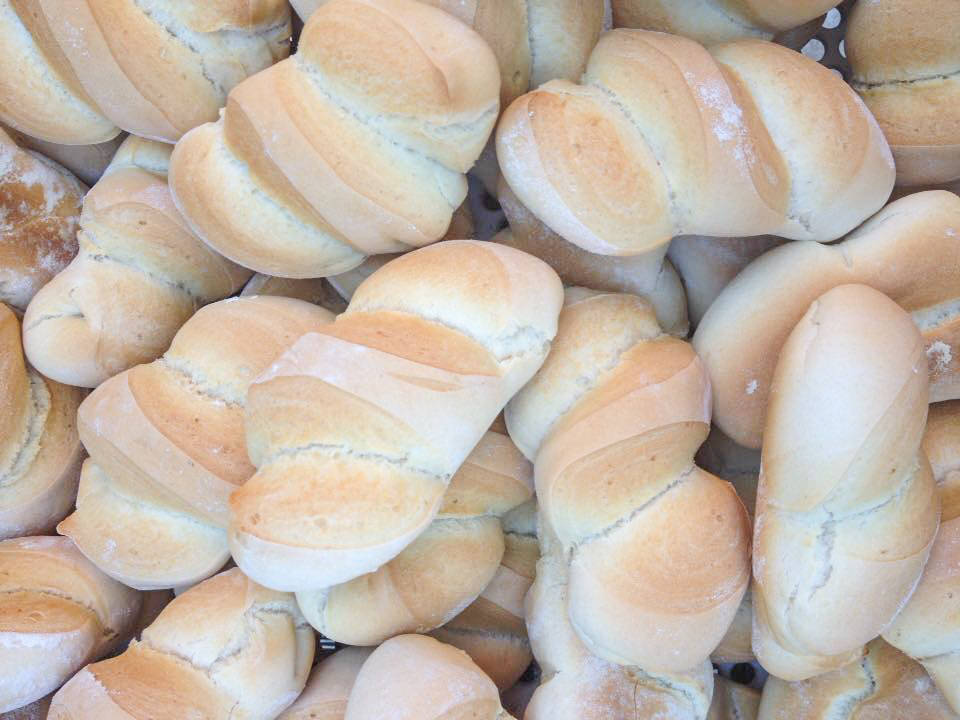
Córdoba telera

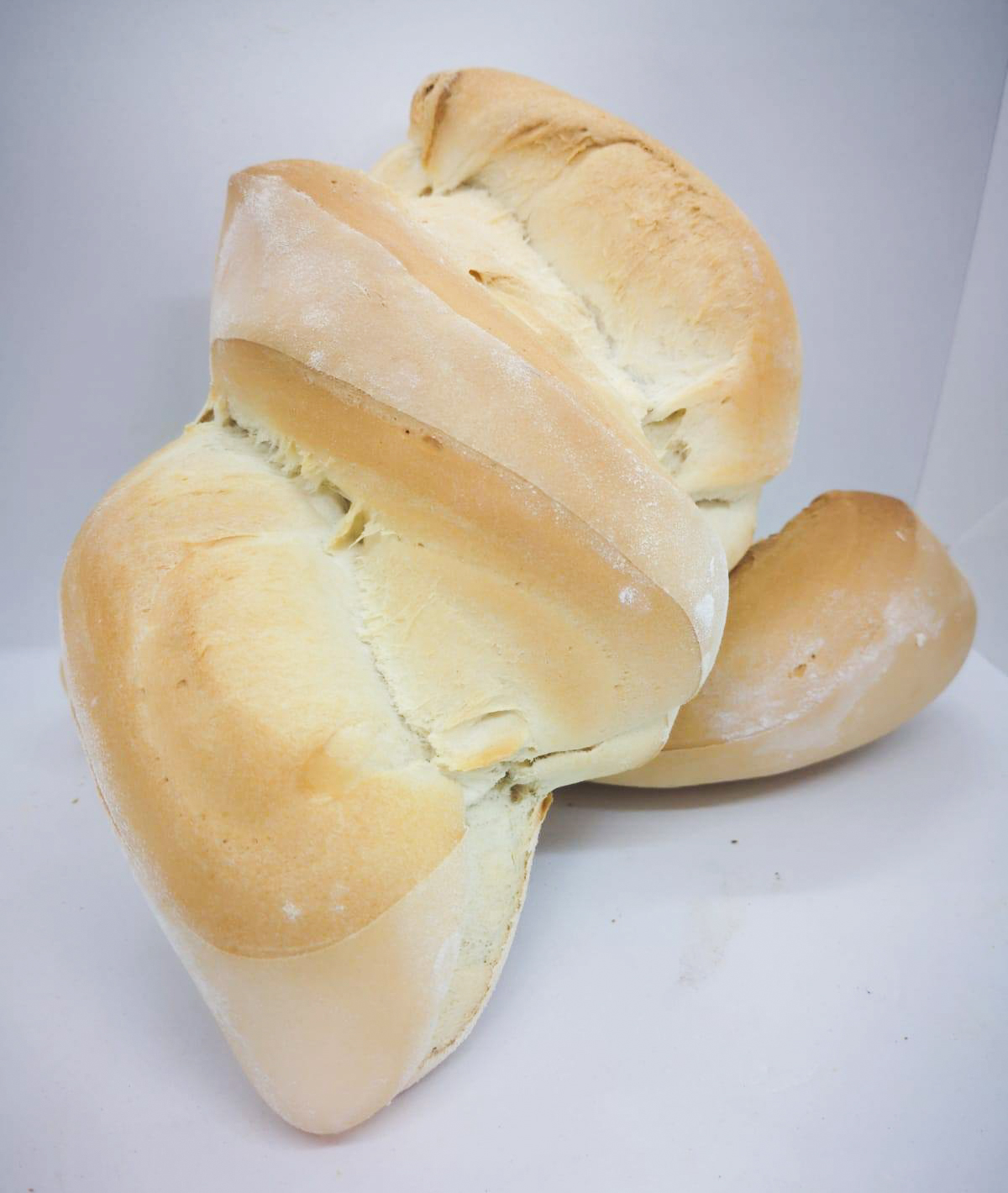
Telera

In Spain, telera is a bread from the area of Córdoba (in Andalusia). Includes ~W130 wheat flour, sourdough, water, salt and yeast. Its peculiar shape, which resembles a montera (the traditional hat of a torero), is the result of the deep marks (greña) that are made, generally two, and diagonally along the piece. It is a candeal bread, and typically used to make salmorejo from Córdoba.

== Features ==
The telera cordobesa belongs to a family of Spanish breads called panes candeales ('candeal breads', also known as pan bregado or pan sobado), which have a long tradition in Andalusia, Extremadura and the two Castiles. These breads are made from durum wheat (Triticum turgidum var. durum L.).

== Origin ==
Traditionally it is said that the name of telera is a portmanteau of tres hileras ("three rows"), since it consists of two diagonal ridges that separate the bark into three parts. However, author A. Ortega Morán proposes an analogy with the counter of a plough (called "telera" in Spanish). The counter is a long iron crossbar that kept the plough straight, and that was formerly used in a figurative sense as a synonym for something long. According to the Royal Spanish Academy, it comes from Latin *telaria, in turn from telum, 'sword'. According to the author and baker Ibán Yarza, telera in Spain refers to a variety of breads 'whose common characteristic is to be lengthened'.

== Culinary uses ==
The traditional Andalusian breakfast is made with slices of this bread, young olive oil and sugar. Once staled, telera is ideal for use as an ingredient in salmorejo, an Andalusian soup.

== See also ==
- Bread culture in Spain
- Sandwich roll, or telera, derived Mexican bread
- Sevillian bollo, another Andalusian bread
