= Economy of South America =

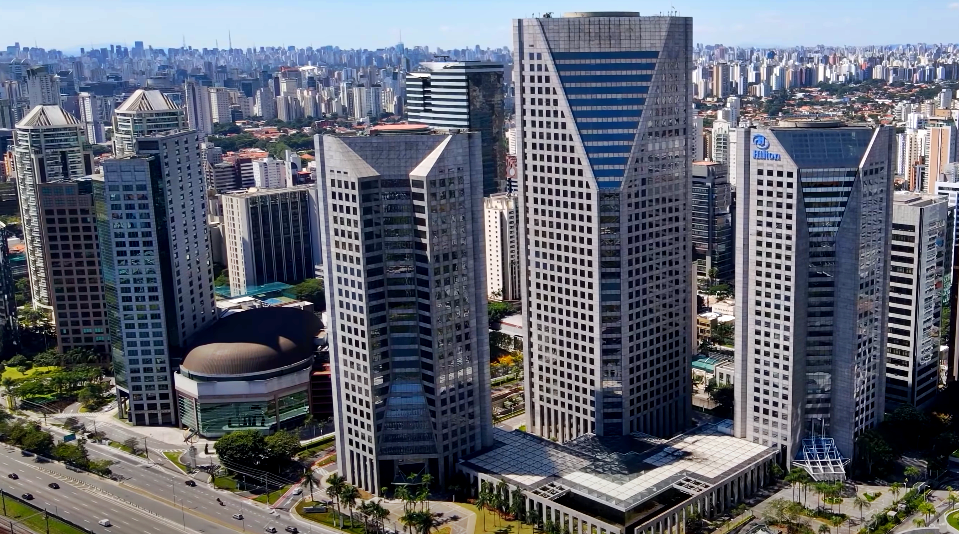
- The Greater São Paulo has the largest gross metropolitan product in South America.

Statistics
- Population: ▲434 million (2022)
- GDP: ▲$4.38 trillion (nominal; 202f); ▲$9.8 trillion (PPP; 2025f)
- GDP rank: 4th (nominal; 2025); 5th (PPP; 2023)
- GDP growth: ▲2.7% (2025f)
- GDP per capita: ▲$10,010 (nominal; 202f); ▲$22,410 (PPP; 2025f)
- GDP per capita rank: 4th (nominal; 2025); 4th (PPP; 2025)
- Millionaires (US$): 915,000 (2022)

Public finance
- Government debt: ▲75.1% of GDP (2023)
- Most numbers are from the International Monetary Fund. IMF South America Datasets All values, unless otherwise stated, are in US dollars.

South America has a diversified developing economy across the fourth-largest continental land-mass in the world. It comprises approximately 434 million people living in the 12 sovereign states and three dependent territories of South America, which encompasses 6 percent of the world's population. In 2025, South America ranks fourth in terms of nominal GDP by continent, behind Europe and after Africa and Oceania.

South America has two major trade blocks: Mercosur and the Andean Community. Brazil is the largest economy in South America in terms of nominal GDP.

== History ==
=== 20th century ===
From the 1930s to the 1980s, countries in South America used import substitution, an economic policy that replaces foreign businesses as well as imports with domestic production. This was a policy made to increase domestic manufacturing. Furthermore, national spending on arms soared during periods of military rule. Increasingly, South American countries began to borrow from foreign private banks and international lending institutions, such as the World Bank and the Inter-American Development Bank, to fund existing programs while also trying to expand their economic productivity through investments. However, this policy created a debt crisis in South America.

The continent has fallen further behind North America over the past two centuries. This can be explained by South America's high concentration on primary commodities as well as the state of the educational system and institutional structure, some of which are still related to its colonial past, others to recent political developments.

From the 1990s on, countries in South America switched over to the free-market economy system. Now, major economic activities include agriculture, industry, forestry, and mining.

=== 21st century ===
In 2016, four countries, which include Brazil, Ecuador, Argentina, and Venezuela, experienced a decline in output. Other countries in the region were observing a slowdown in growth rates. Brazil saw this decline in output due to increasing unemployment levels, worsening financial conditions, and political issues, which, in turn, led to a decrease in private domestic consumption and investment. Argentina also experienced a recession in private consumption and investment; however, it was because of the removal of public service subsidies due to a short-term rise in inflation. In contrast, Peru differed from other countries in the region, demonstrating an increase in growth rates thanks to copper production.

In 2017, the economy started to recover for the first time since 2014. The main contributor to economic growth is private consumption. Increased retail trade and industrial production in Brazil have led to an expansion of its economy by 1% in 2017. Higher public investments and private consumption have resulted in the growth of the economy of Argentina compared to its recession in 2016.

In 2017, inflation rates were observed to be on a downward trend in most of the major economies. The reasons are prior exchange rate appreciations and food price deflation. Some countries are even expected to lower their target bands in 2019.

== By country ==
Country	GDP (nominal) $bn 2025	GDP (PPP) $bn 2025	GDP per capita $,000 2025	Merchandise exports $bn 2022	Human Development Index 2021	% with less than $2.15 per day 2021
Argentina	683	1,240	27	103	0.84	1
Bolivia	56	125	10	15	0.69	2
Brazil	2,130	4,100	20	380	0.75	6
Chile	344	600	30	107	0.86	0.7
Colombia	427	1,000	19	72	0.75	7
Ecuador	125	243	13	36	0.74	3
Falkland Islands		0.2	71			
French Guiana	5		20			
Guyana	25	49	61	5	0.71	
Paraguay	45	117	16	15	0.72	1.3
Peru	303	550	16	71	0.76	3
Suriname	4.5	11	18	3	0.73	
Uruguay	79	103	29	23	0.81	0.1
Venezuela	108	21	8	23	0.69	
Total	4,100	8,200	19	850		

Economy of:

- Argentina
- Bolivia
- Brazil
- Chile
- Colombia
- Ecuador
- French Guiana
- Guyana
- Paraguay
- Peru
- Suriname
- Uruguay
- Venezuela

== Economic sectors ==
=== Agriculture ===
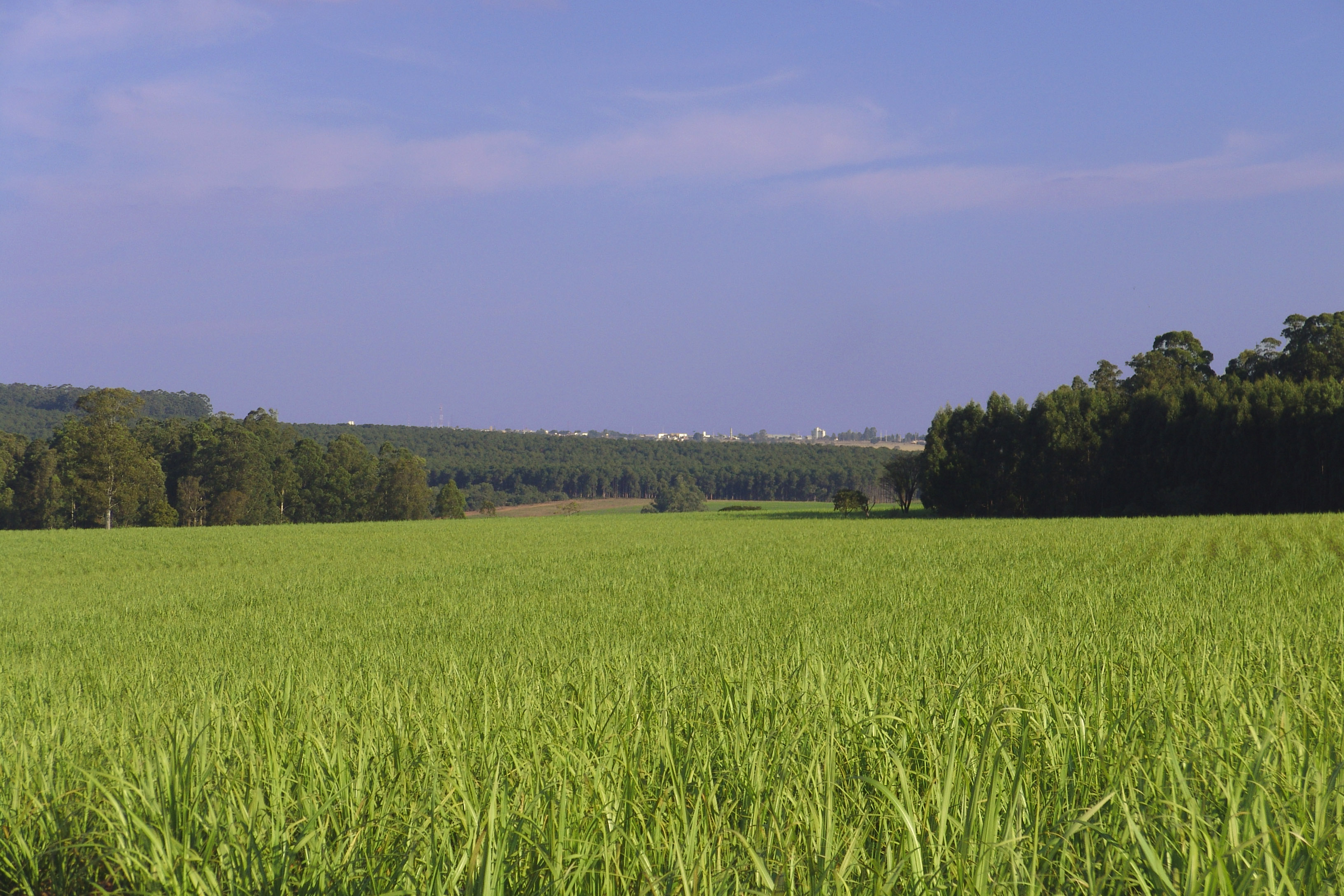
Sugarcane plantation in São Paulo. In 2018, Brazil was the world's largest producer, with 746 million tons. South America produces half of the world's sugarcane.

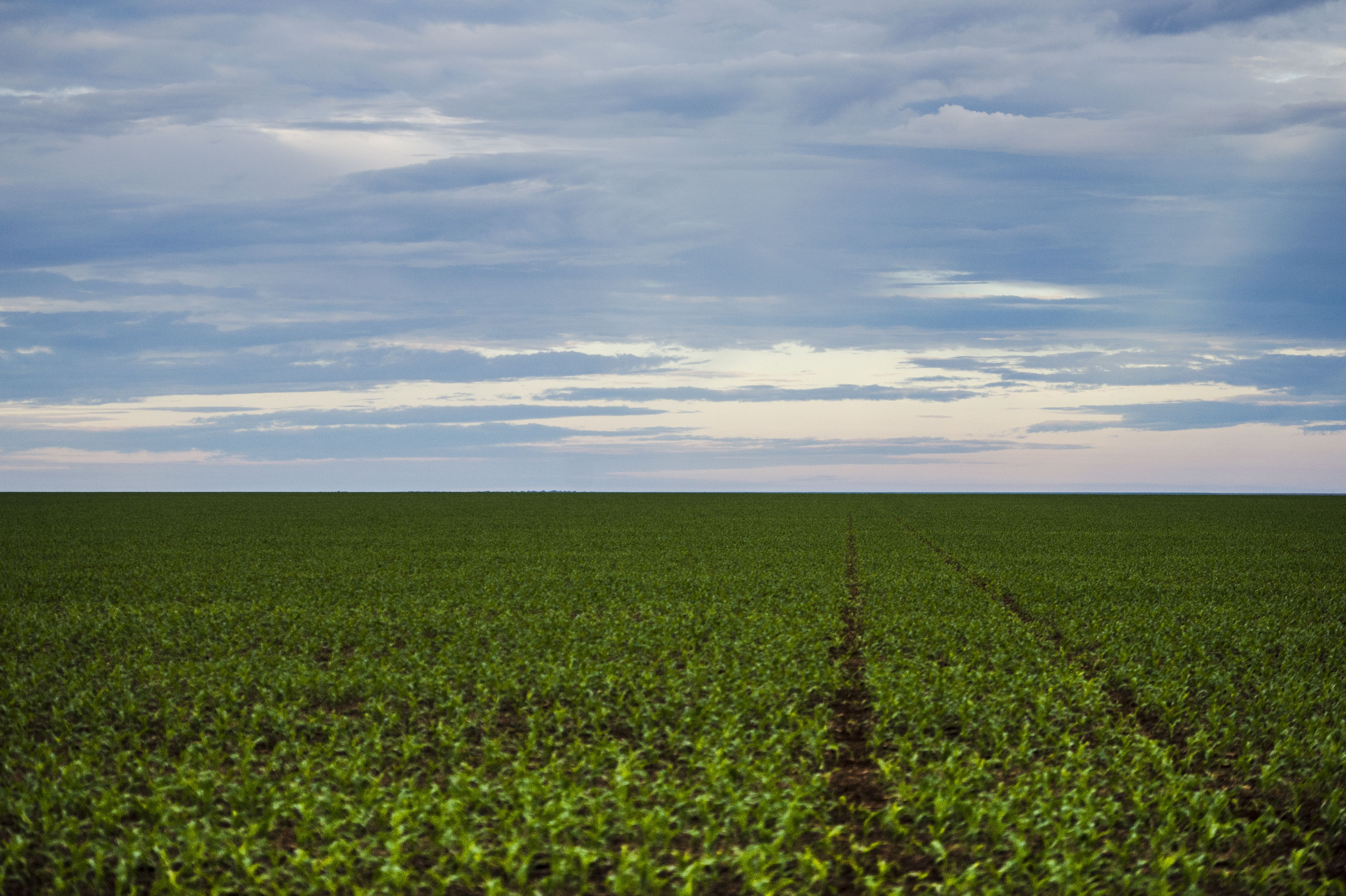
Soy plantation in Mato Grosso. In 2020, Brazil was the world's largest producer, with 130 million tons. South America produces half of the world's soybeans.

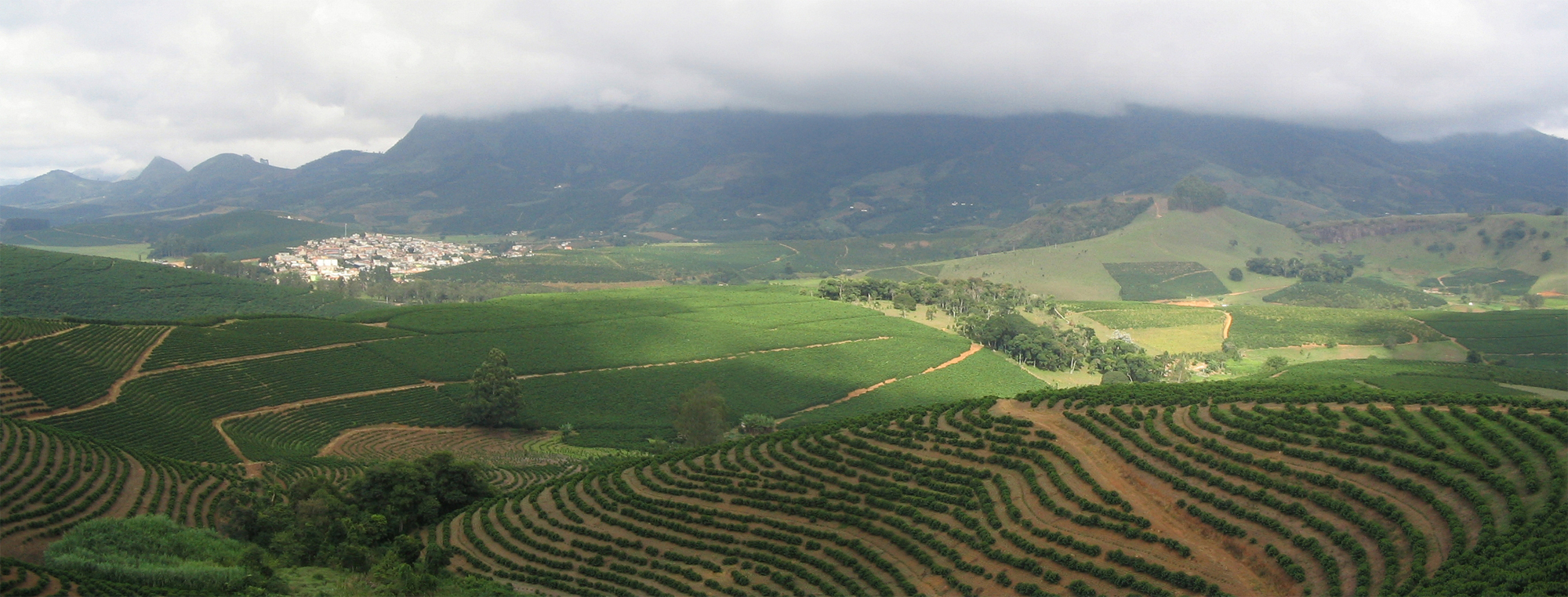
Coffee in Minas Gerais. In 2018, Brazil was the world's largest producer, with 3.5 million tons. South America produces half of the world's coffee.

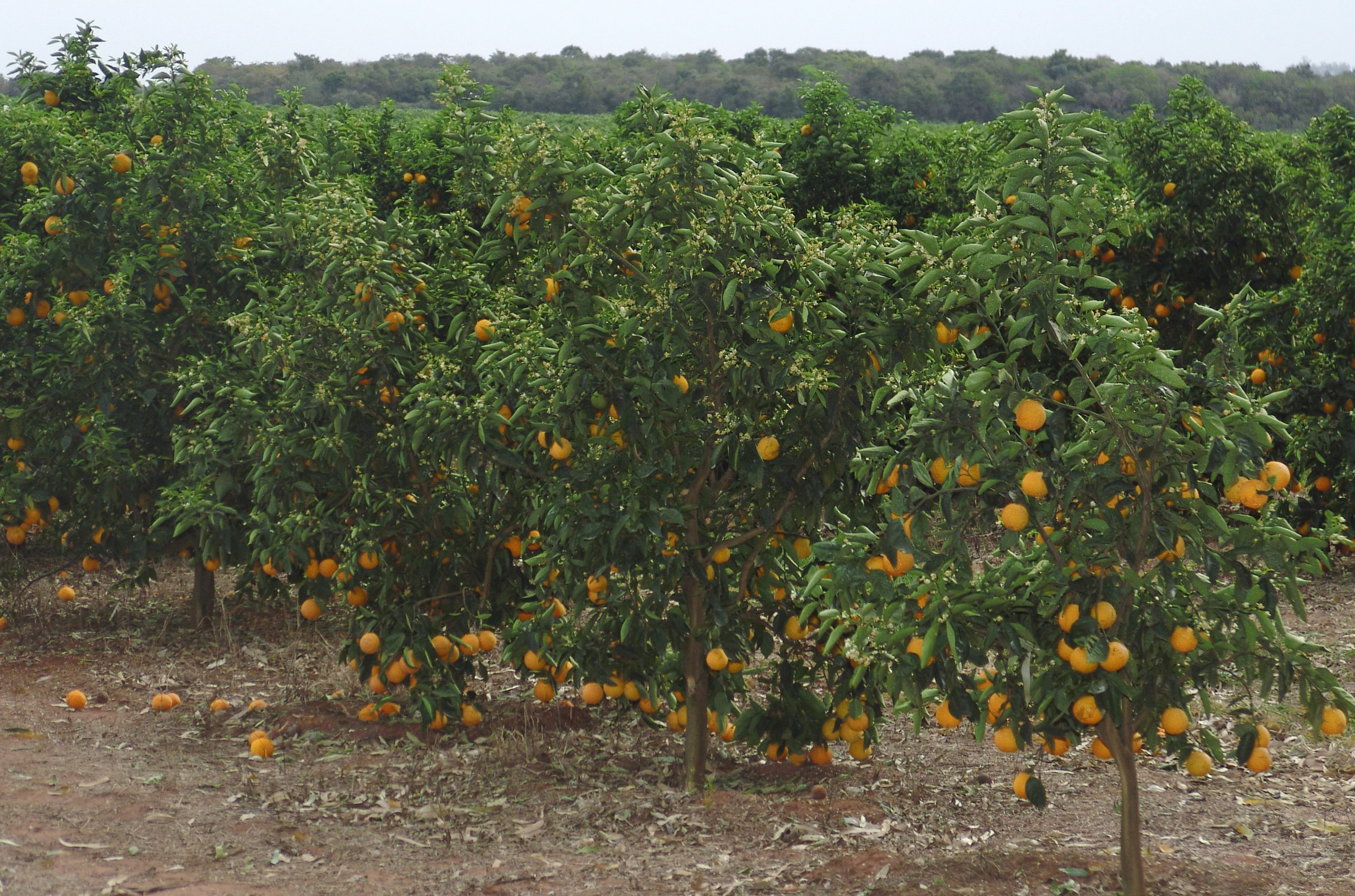
Orange in São Paulo. In 2018, Brazil was the world's largest producer, with 17 million tons. South America produces 25% of the world's oranges.

Throughout history, since the colonial period, the export of natural resources has been a key factor for South America's economy. With a land that can be divided into four climatic regions (tropical, temperate, arid and cold), South America is a diverse land rich in natural resources. It has a wide variety of agricultural products, mineral wealth, plentiful freshwater and rich fisheries.

As one of the most important contributors of the world's agricultural market, South America accounts for approximately 10% of the global agricultural product export. The different climatic regions are home for diverse types of crops. In the tropical climatic regions, two of the most important cash crops are coffee and cacao. South America dominates the global market in coffee production, having Brazil as the world's largest exporter of coffee. A report from the Council of Brazilian Coffee Exporters showed that the coffee industry earned US$5.4 billion in 2016, with the exports of different coffee varieties exceeding 34 million 60 kg bags. This accounts to 6.4% of Brazil's total annual agrobusiness exports of US$84.9. The report showed that by December 2016, the Brazilian coffee industry generated US$557 million in revenue by exporting 3.07 million bags of coffee. Additionally, in 2016 soybeans, grown in South America's temperate climates, had an export value of US$19B for Brazil, representing 10.4% of the total exports, and one of US$3.23B for Argentina, representing 5.7% of the country's total exports. Moreover, the soybean meal exportation represent 17.5% of Argentina's total exports, with an export value of $9.96B.

Other exports from the tropical regions, such as the Amazon rainforest (contained within Brazil, Peru, Colombia, Ecuador, Bolivia French Guiana and Suriname), include cashews and Brazil nuts, globally regarded as delicacies, as well as sugar (sugarcane), avocados, bananas, pineapples, oranges, grapefruits, and mangoes. The sugarcane cultivation has been the backbone of the economy since early colonial times, and Ecuador is the world's largest banana exporter (Banana Production in Ecuador)

In the temperate regions, maize (corn) is produced and it is the second most exported product in Argentinas. Additionally in cold climatic regions such as the Andes, there is a high production of crops such as quinoa, increasingly valued internationally, as well as the grazing of llamas, vicuñas and alpacas. These animals are bred for their wool and it is exported globally as a high-quality textile.

The four countries with the strongest agriculture are Brazil, Argentina, Chile and Colombia. Currently:

- Brazil is the world's largest producer of sugarcane, soy, coffee, orange, guaraná, açaí and Brazil nut; is one of the top 5 producers of maize, papaya, tobacco, pineapple, banana, cotton, beans, coconut, watermelon, lemon and yerba mate; is one of the top 10 world producers of cocoa, cashew, avocado, tangerine, persimmon, mango, guava, rice, oat, sorghum and tomato; and is one of the top 15 world producers of grape, apple, melon, peanut, fig, peach, onion, palm oil and natural rubber;
- Argentina is the world's largest producer of yerba mate; is one of the 5 largest producers in the world of soy, maize, sunflower seed, lemon and pear, one of the 10 largest producers in the world of barley, grape, artichoke, tobacco and cotton, and one of the 15 largest producers in the world of wheat, oat, chickpea, sugarcane, sorghum and grapefruit;
- Chile is one of the 5 largest world producers of cherry and cranberry, and one of the 10 largest world producers of grape, apple, kiwi, peach, plum and hazelnut, focusing on exporting high-value fruits;
- Colombia is one of the 5 largest producers in the world of coffee, avocado and palm oil, and one of the 10 largest producers in the world of sugarcane, banana, pineapple and cocoa;
- Peru is the world's largest producer of quinoa; is one of the 5 largest producers of avocado, blueberry, artichoke and asparagus; one of the 10 largest producers in the world of coffee and cocoa; one of the 15 largest producers in the world of potato and pineapple, and also has a considerable production of grape, sugarcane, rice, banana, maize and cassava; its agriculture is considerably diversified;
- Paraguay's agriculture is currently developing, being currently the 6th largest producer of soy in the world and entering the list of the 20 largest producers of maize and sugarcane.

=== Animal husbandry ===
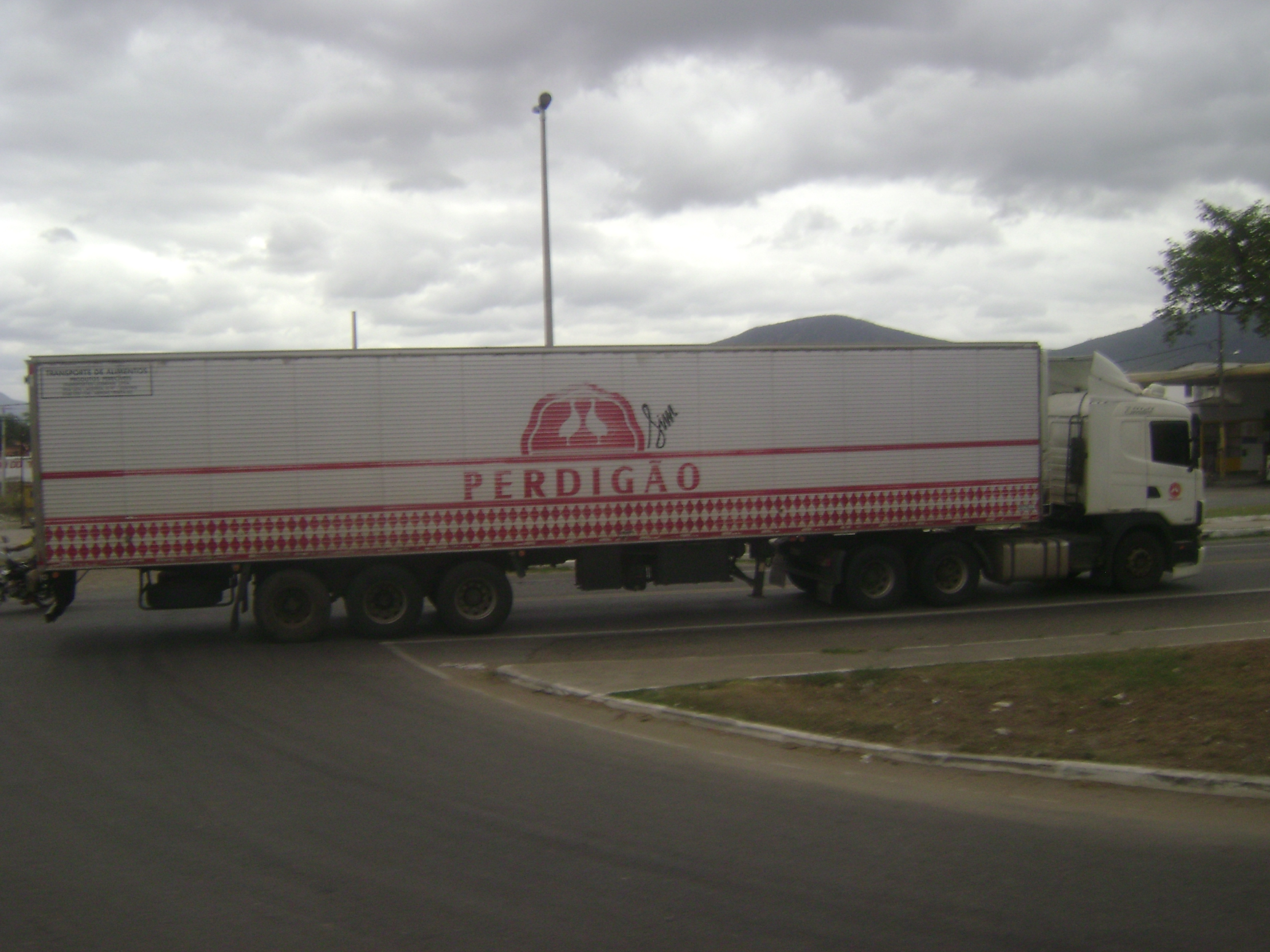
Truck of a meat company in Brazil. South America produces 20% of the world's beef and chicken meat.

Brazil is the world's largest exporter of chicken meat: 3.77 million tons in 2019. The country is the holder of the second largest herd of cattle in the world, 22.2% of the world herd. The country was the second-largest producer of beef in 2019, responsible for 15.4% of global production. It was also the 3rd largest world producer of milk in 2018. This year, the country produced 35.1 billion liters. In 2019, Brazil was the 4th largest pork producer in the world, with almost 4 million tons.

In 2018, Argentina was the 4th largest producer of beef in the world, with a production of 3 million tons (behind only USA, Brazil and China). Uruguay is also a major meat producer. In 2018, it produced 589 thousand tons of beef.

In chicken meat production, Argentina ranks among the 15 largest producers in the world, and Peru and Colombia are among the 20 biggest producers. In beef production, Colombia is one of the 20 largest producers in the world. In honey production, Argentina ranks among the 5 largest producers in the world, and Brazil among the 15 largest. In terms of production of cow's milk, Argentina ranks among the 20 largest producers in the world.

=== Industry ===
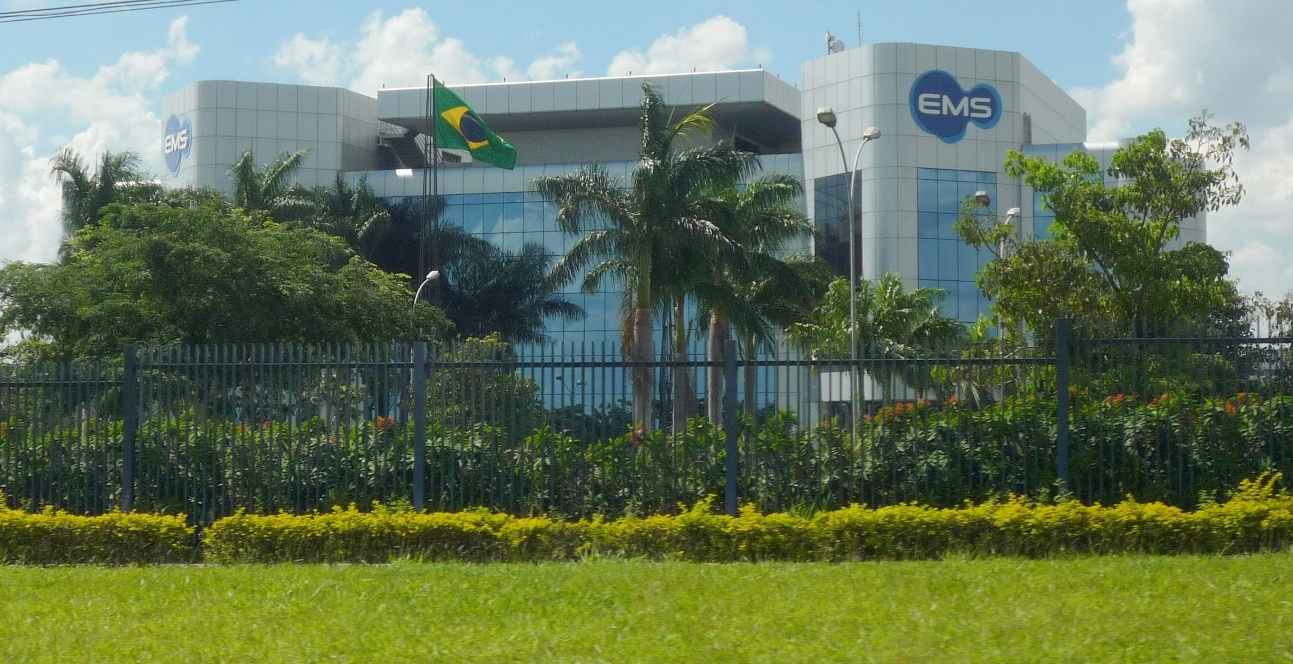
EMS, the largest Brazilian pharmaceutical industry

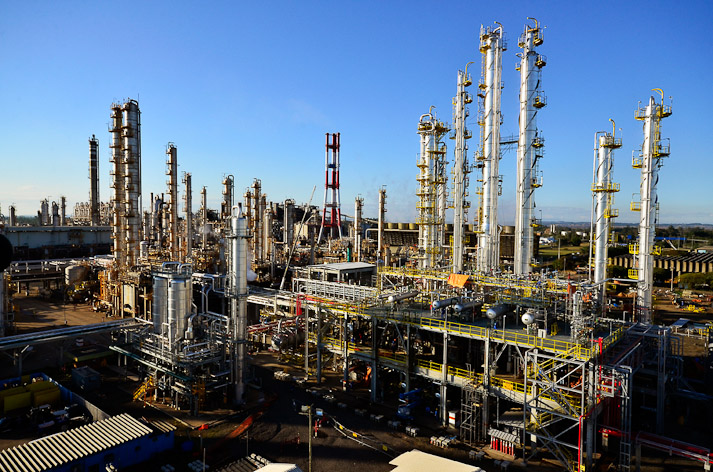
Braskem, the largest Brazilian chemical industry

The World Bank annually lists the top manufacturing countries by total manufacturing value. According to the 2019 list, Brazil has the thirteenth most valuable industry in the world (US$173.6 billion), Venezuela the thirtieth largest (US$58.2 billion, however, it depends on oil to obtain this value), Argentina the 31st largest (US$57.7 billion), Colombia the 46th largest (US$35.4 billion), Peru the 50th largest (US$28.7 billion) and Chile the 51st largest (US$28.3 billion).

80% of the manufacturing of the Latin America region falls on Argentina, Brazil and Mexico.

Brazil has the third-largest manufacturing sector in the Americas. Accounting for 28.5 percent of GDP, Brazil's industries range from automobiles, steel, and petrochemicals to computers, aircraft (Embraer), food, pharmaceutical, footwear, metallurgy and consumer durables. In the food industry, in 2019, Brazil was the second largest exporter of processed foods in the world. In 2016, the country was the 2nd largest producer of pulp in the world and the 8th producer of paper. In the footwear industry, in 2019, Brazil ranked 4th among world producers. In 2019, the country was the 8th producer of vehicles and the 9th producer of steel in the world. In 2018, the chemical industry of Brazil was the 8th in the world. In textile industry, Brazil, although it was among the 5 largest world producers in 2013, is very little integrated in world trade. In the aviation sector, Brazil has Embraer, the third largest aircraft manufacturer in the world, behind Boeing and Airbus.

In 2019, Argentina was the 31st world producer of steel, the 28th producer of vehicles, the 22nd world producer of beer, the 4th world producer of soybean oil and the 3rd world producer of sunflower oil, among other industrial products.

=== Mining ===
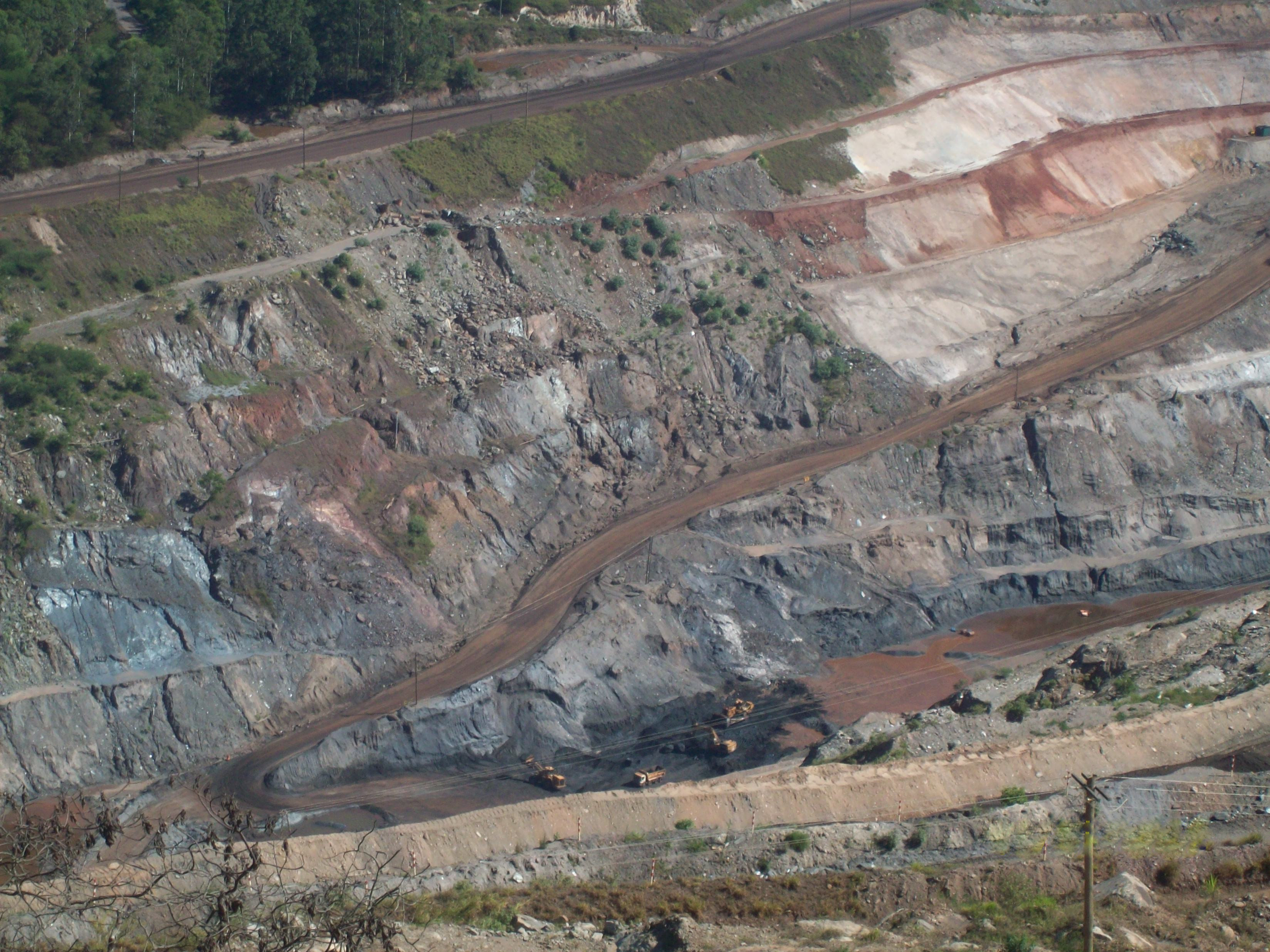
Iron mine in Minas Gerais. Brazil is the world's second largest iron ore exporter.

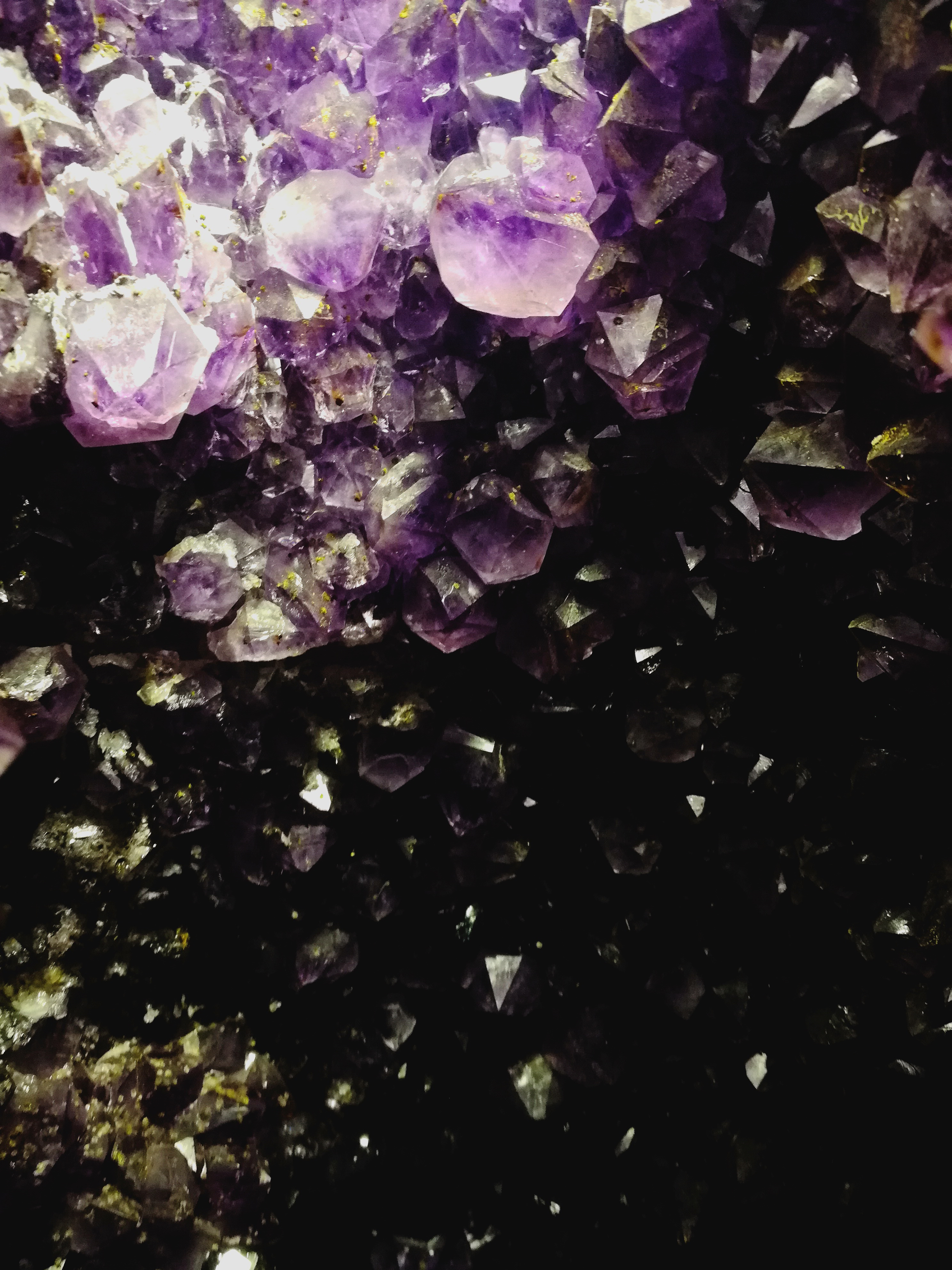
Amethyst mine in Ametista do Sul. South America is a major producer of gems such as amethyst, topaz, emerald, aquamarine and tourmaline

Mining is one of the most important economic sectors in South America, especially for Chile, Peru and Bolivia, whose economies are highly dependent on this sector. The continent has large productions of gold (mainly in Peru, Brazil and Argentina); silver (mainly in Peru, Chile, Bolivia and Argentina); copper (mainly in Chile, Peru and Brazil); iron ore (Brazil, Peru and Chile); zinc (Peru, Bolivia and Brazil); molybdenum (Chile and Peru); lithium (Chile, Argentina and Brazil); lead (Peru and Bolivia); bauxite (Brazil); tin (Peru, Bolivia and Brazil); manganese (Brazil); antimony (Bolivia and Ecuador); nickel (Brazil); niobium (Brazil); rhenium (Chile); iodine (Chile), among others.

Brazil stands out in the extraction of iron ore (where it is the 2nd largest producer and exporter in the world – iron ore is usually one of the 3 export products that generate the greatest value in the country's trade balance), copper, gold, bauxite (one of the 5 largest producers in the world), manganese (one of the 5 largest producers in the world), tin (one of the largest producers in the world), niobium (concentrates 98% of reserves known to the world) and nickel. In terms of gemstones, Brazil is the world's largest producer of amethyst, topaz, agate and one of the main producers of tourmaline, emerald, aquamarine, garnet and opal.

Chile contributes about a third of the world copper production. In addition to copper, Chile was, in 2019, the world's largest producer of iodine and rhenium, the second largest producer of lithium and molybdenum, the sixth largest producer of silver, the seventh largest producer of salt, the eighth largest producer of potash, the thirteenth producer of sulfur and the thirteenth producer of iron ore in the world.

In 2019, Peru was the 2nd largest world producer of copper and silver, 8th largest world producer of gold, 3rd largest world producer of lead, 2nd largest world producer of zinc, 4th largest world producer of tin, 5th largest world producer of boron and 4th largest world producer of molybdenum.

In 2019, Bolivia was the 8th largest world producer of silver; 4th largest world producer of boron; 5th largest world producer of antimony; 5th largest world producer of tin; 6th largest world producer of tungsten; 7th largest producer of zinc, and the 8th largest producer of lead.

In 2019, Argentina was the 4th largest world producer of lithium, the 9th largest world producer of silver, the 17th largest world producer of gold and the 7th largest world producer of boron.

Colombia is the world's largest producer of emeralds. In the production of gold, among 2006 and 2017, the country produced 15 tons per year until 2007, when its production increased significantly, breaking a record of 66.1 tons extracted in 2012. In 2017, it extracted 52.2 tons. The country is among the 25 largest gold producers in the world. In the production of silver, in 2017 the country extracted 15,5 tons.

=== Oil and gas ===
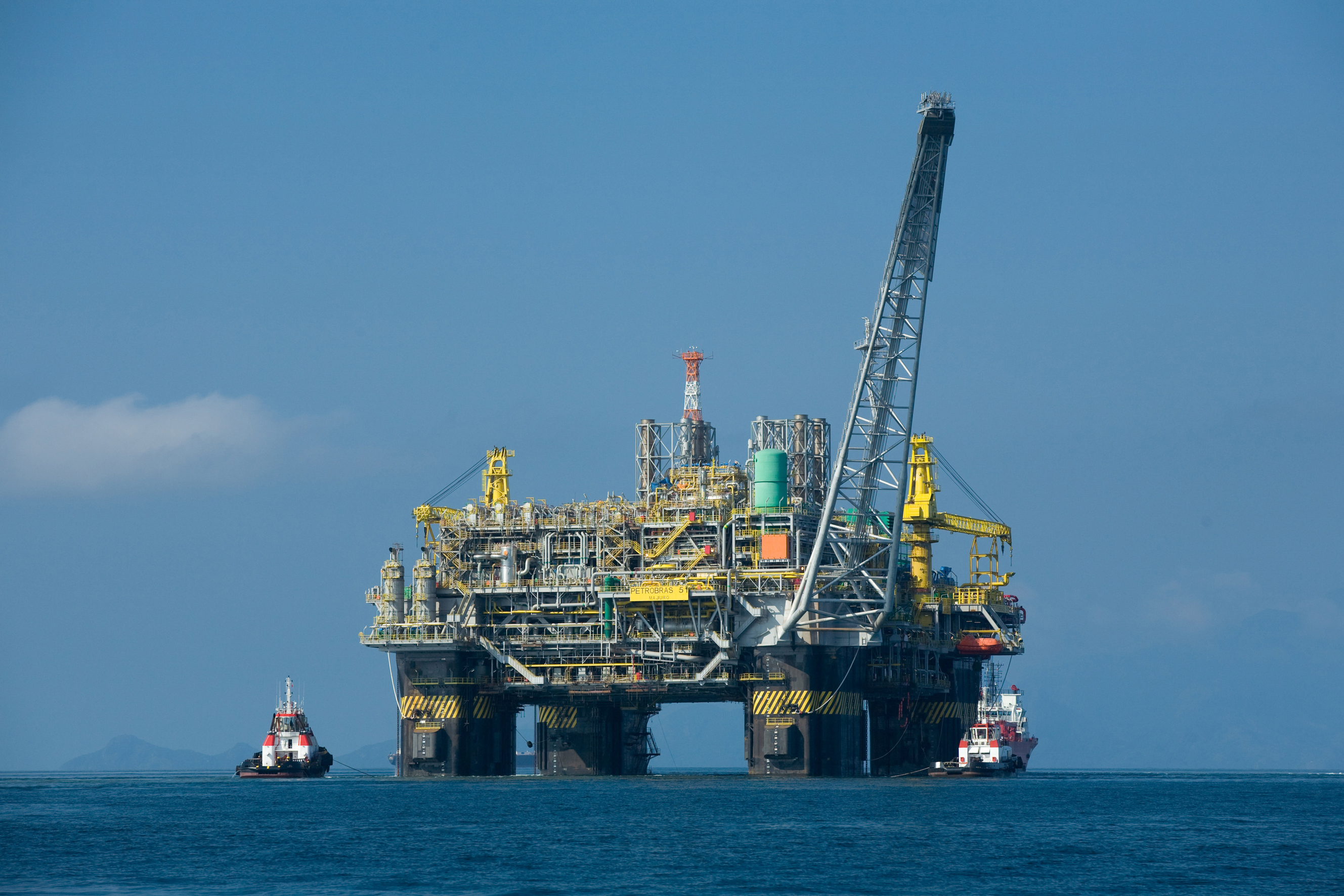
The P-51 Oil Platform in Brazil. Photo by Divulgação Petrobras / ABr, Wikipedia Commons.

In the production of oil, Brazil was the 9th largest producer in the world in 2024, with 3.5 million barrels / day. Mexico was the 11th, with about 1.84 million barrels / day. Argentina was the 17th, with 1.2 million barrels/ day. Venezuela was the 21st with 960 thousand barrels / day, followed by Columbia with 773 thousand barrels / day. Ecuador was 30th, producing 475 thousand barrels / day.

As Venezuela and Ecuador consume little oil and export most of their production, they are part of OPEC. Venezuela had a large drop in production after 2015 (where it produced 2.5 million barrels / day), falling in 2016 to 2.2 million, in 2017 to 2 million, in 2018 to 1.4 million and in 2019 to 877 thousand, due to lack of investments after the US imposed sanctions in 2017. In December of 2025, production fell to 800,000 barrels / day. Oil price shocks can cause oil producing economies to benefit economically for short periods of time as prices for the commodity increase.

Venezuela's oil sector suffers from energy nationalism and US sanctions which have been in place for a decade. Most of oil out of Venezuela is purchased by China.

The production of oil in Latin American countries has largely been controlled by foreign multinationals supported by their home governments in the global north. Oil policies have changed over time from nationalization to expropriation of foreign owned assets and free for all arrangements with foreign multinationals.

The global demand for natural gas increased by 2.7%, reaching a new demand high in 2024. This is largely due to developing economies and emerging markets, especially in Asia. In the production of natural gas, Argentina, Brazil and Venezuela are current leaders for Latin America. Latin America's natural gas market generated US$35.9 million in revenue in 2025 and made up 2.0% of the global market.

From 2022 to 2024, 297 banks invested $138.5 billion in fossil fuel projects in Latin America and the Caribbean, with 92% of financing coming from outside the region.

=== Tourism ===
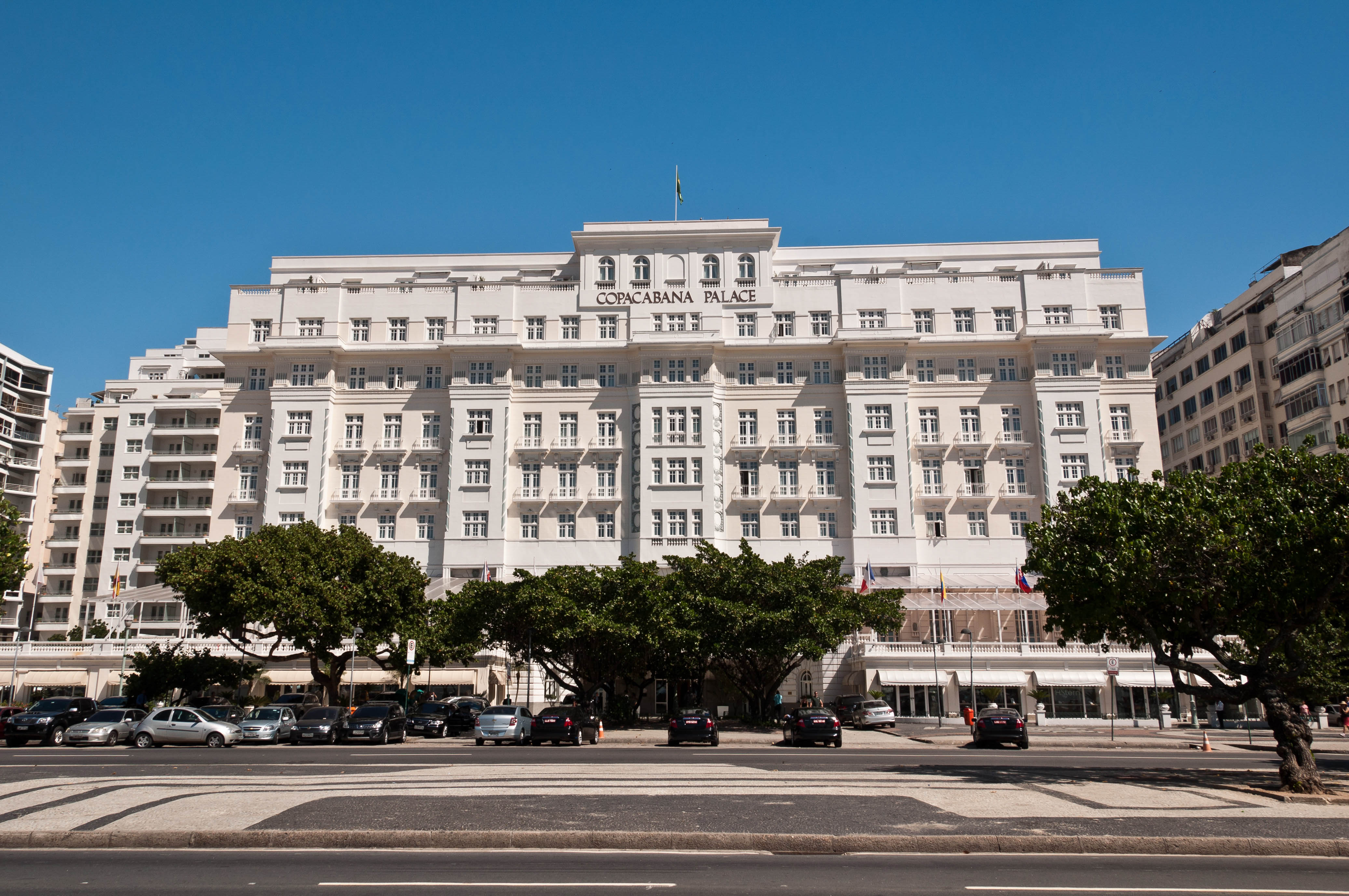
Copacabana Palace, one of the best hotels in South America, in Rio de Janeiro

Tourism in South America is still little evolved: in Europe, for example, countries obtain annual tourist values such as U $73.7 billion (Spain), or U $67.3 billion (France). While Europe received 710 million tourists in 2018, Asia 347 million and North America 142.2 million, South America received only 37 million, Central America 10.8 million and the Caribbean 25.7 million.

Selected Caribbean and Latin American countries	International tourist arrivals 2019 (x1000)	International tourism receipts 2019 (million USD)	Receipts per arrival 2019 (col 2)/(col 1) (USD)	Arrivals per capita per 1000 pop. (estimated) 2007	Receipts per capita 2005 USD	Revenues as % of exports goods and services 2003	Tourism revenues as % GDP 2012	% Direct & indirect employment in tourism 2012	World Ranking Tourism Compet. TTCI 2024	Index value TTCI 2024
Argentina	7,399	5,241	708	115	57	7.4	10.5	9.9	49	4.10
Brazil	6,353	5,995	944	26	18	3.2	8.9	8.1	26	4.41
Chile	4,518	2,302	510	151	73	5.3	8.4	8.0	31	4.33
Colombia	4,169	5,682	1,363	26	25	6.6	5.1	5.5	40	4.08
Costa Rica	3,139	3,988	1,270	442	343	17.5	12.5	11.7	51	4.08
Cuba	4,263	2,596	609	188	169	n/d	n/d	n/d	n/d	n/d
Dominican Republic	6,446	7,472	1,159	408	353	36.2	14.7	13.6	64	3.88
Jamaica	2,681	3,639	1,357	628	530	49.2	25.7	23.8	84	3.59
Mexico	45,024	24,573	546	201	103	5.7	12.4	13.7	38	4.26
Panama	1,753	4,520	2,578	330	211	10.6	10.1	9.6	63	3.90
Peru	4,372	3,738	855	65	41	9.0	9.1	7.8	62	3.90
Uruguay	3,056	2,255	738	525	145	14.2	10.2	9.7	71	3.79

- Notes: Green shadow denotes the country with the top indicator.

Please note that the number of tourists does not always reflect the monetary amount the country gets from tourism. Some countries carry out higher levels of tourism, obtaining more benefits.

== Gallery ==
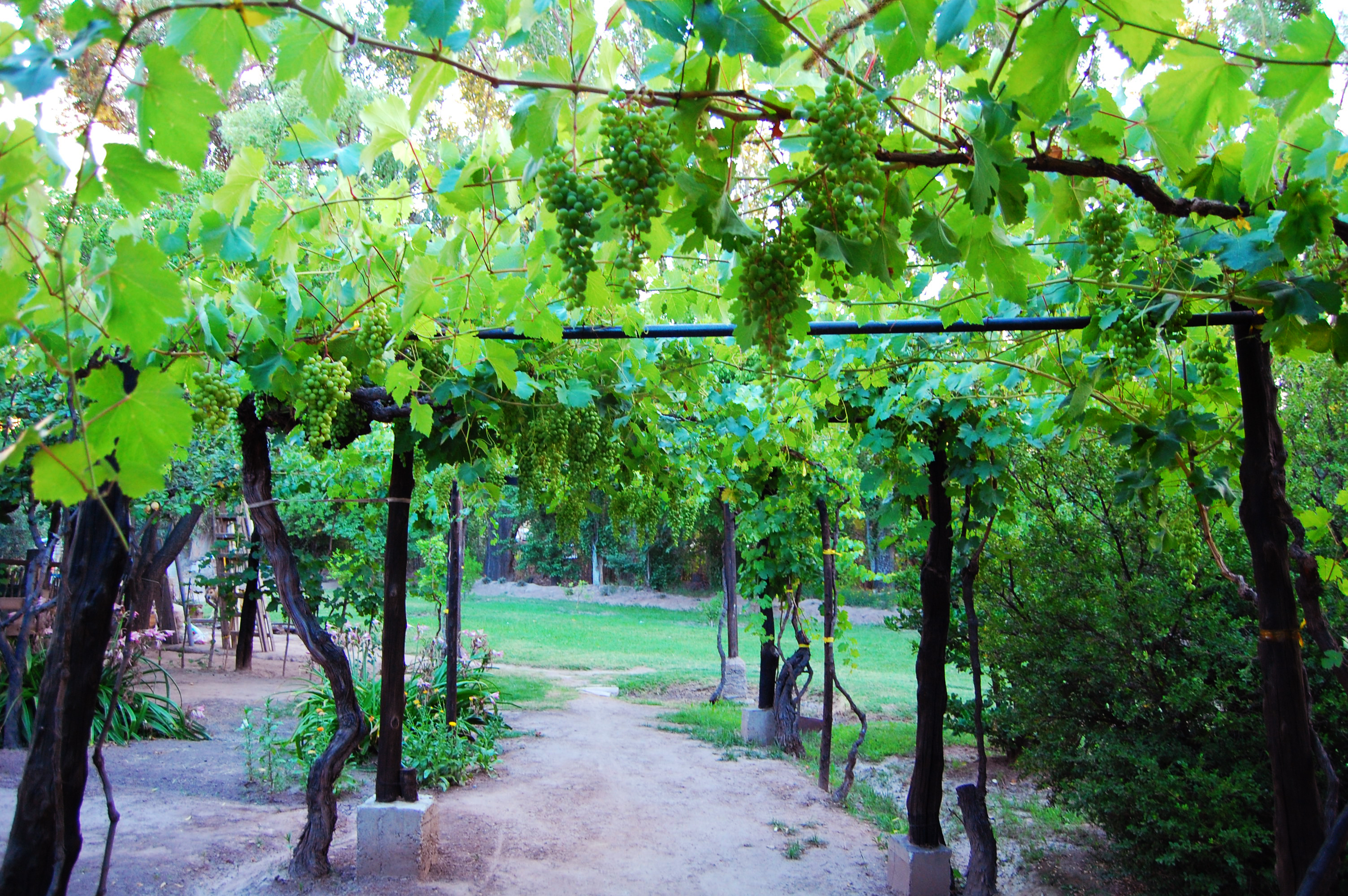
Grape plantation in Argentina. Argentina and Chile are among the 10 largest grape and wine producers in the world and Brazil among the 20 largest.

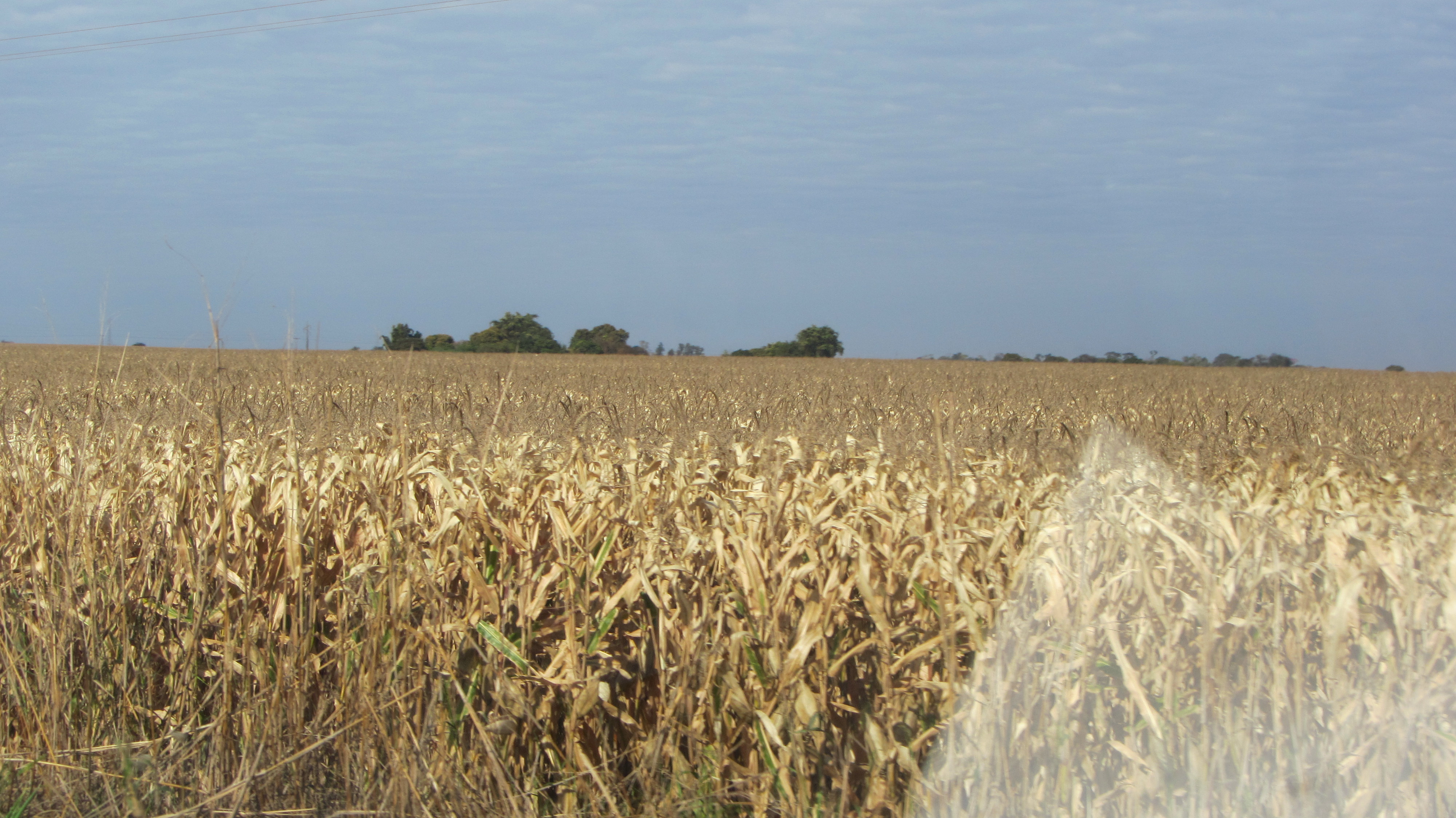
Maize in Dourados. Brazil and Argentina are among the 5 largest world producers

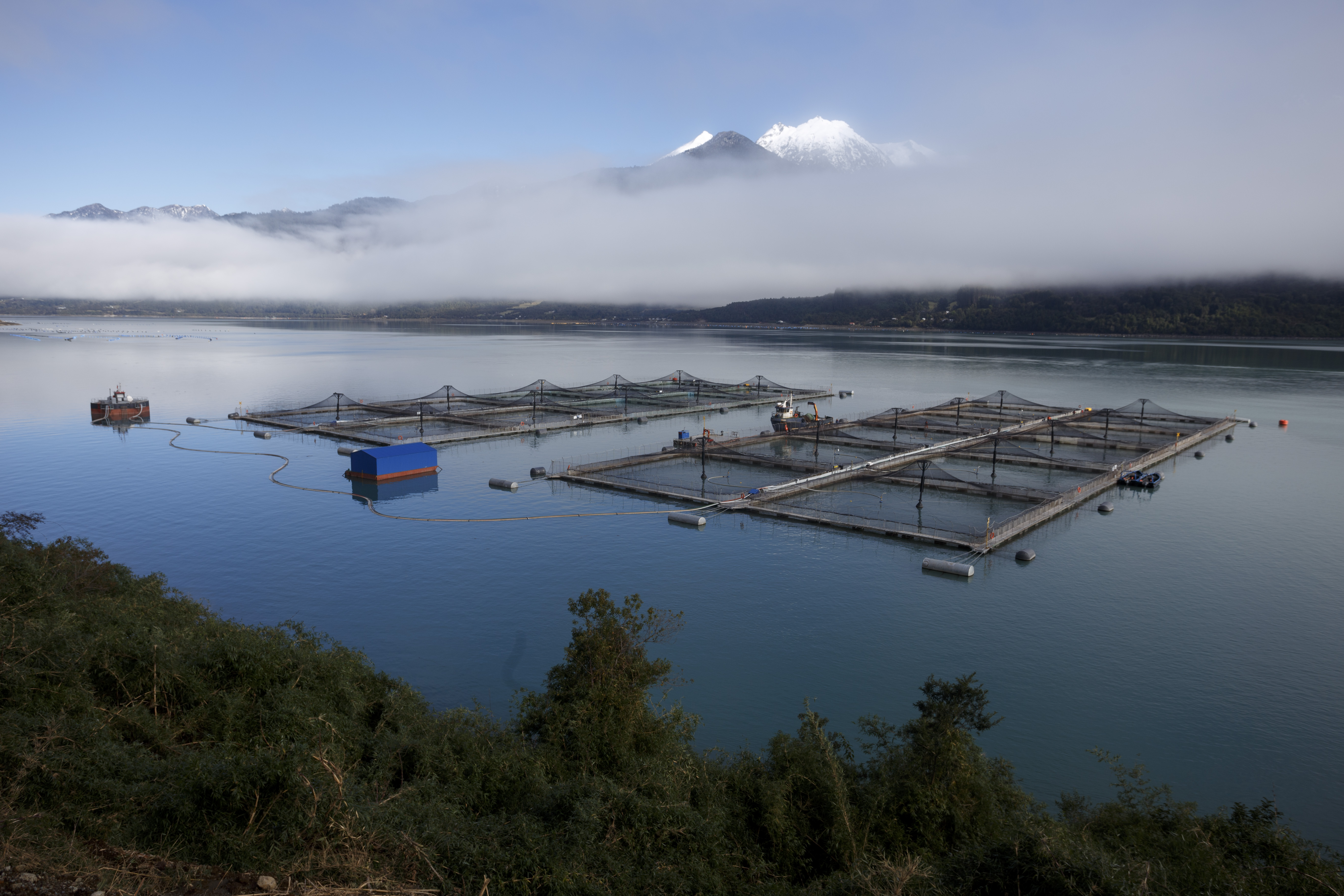
Salmon farming in Chile. One third of all salmon sold in the world comes from the country.

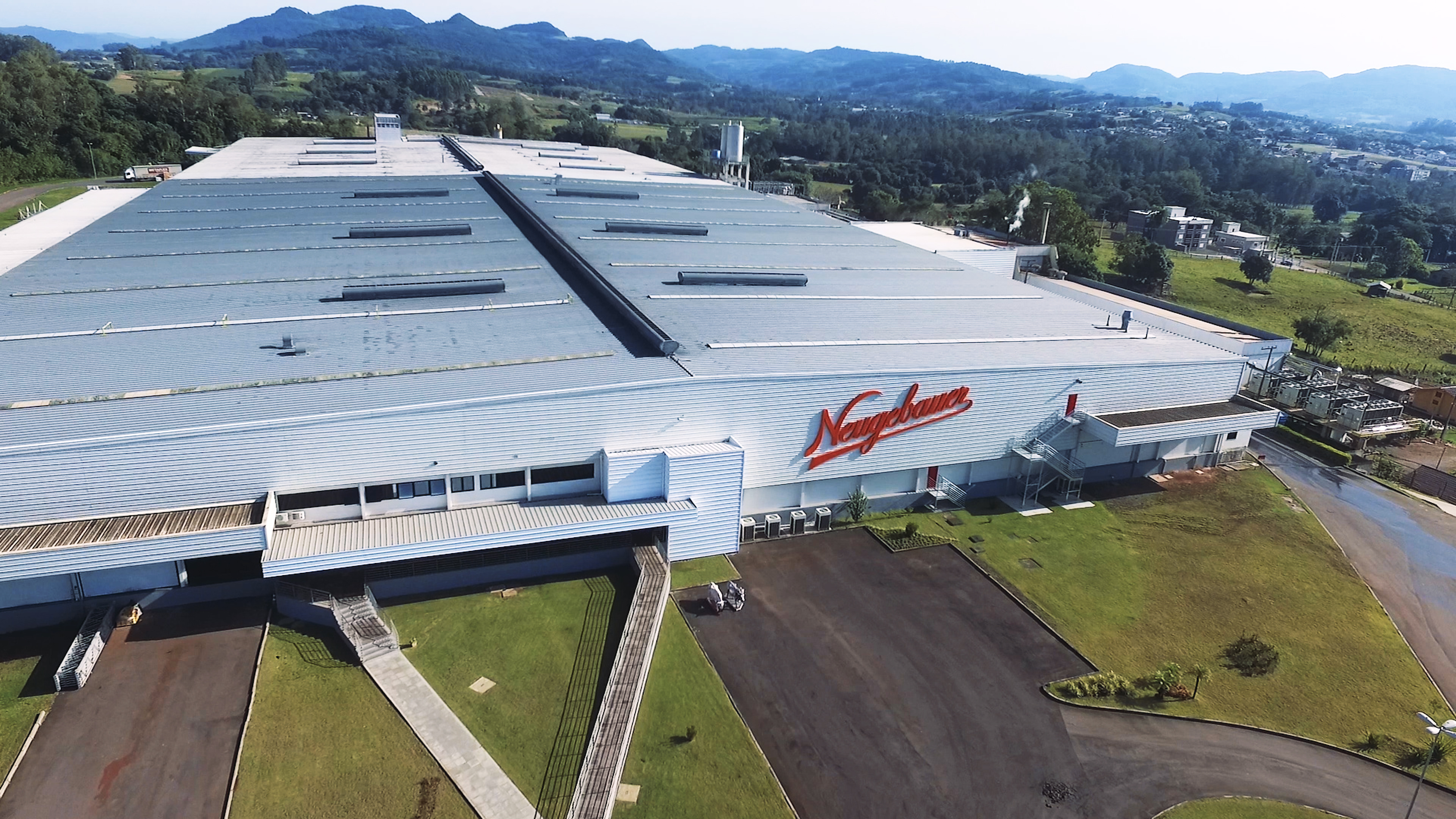
Neugebauer Chocolate Factory in Arroio do Meio. South America specializes in food processing

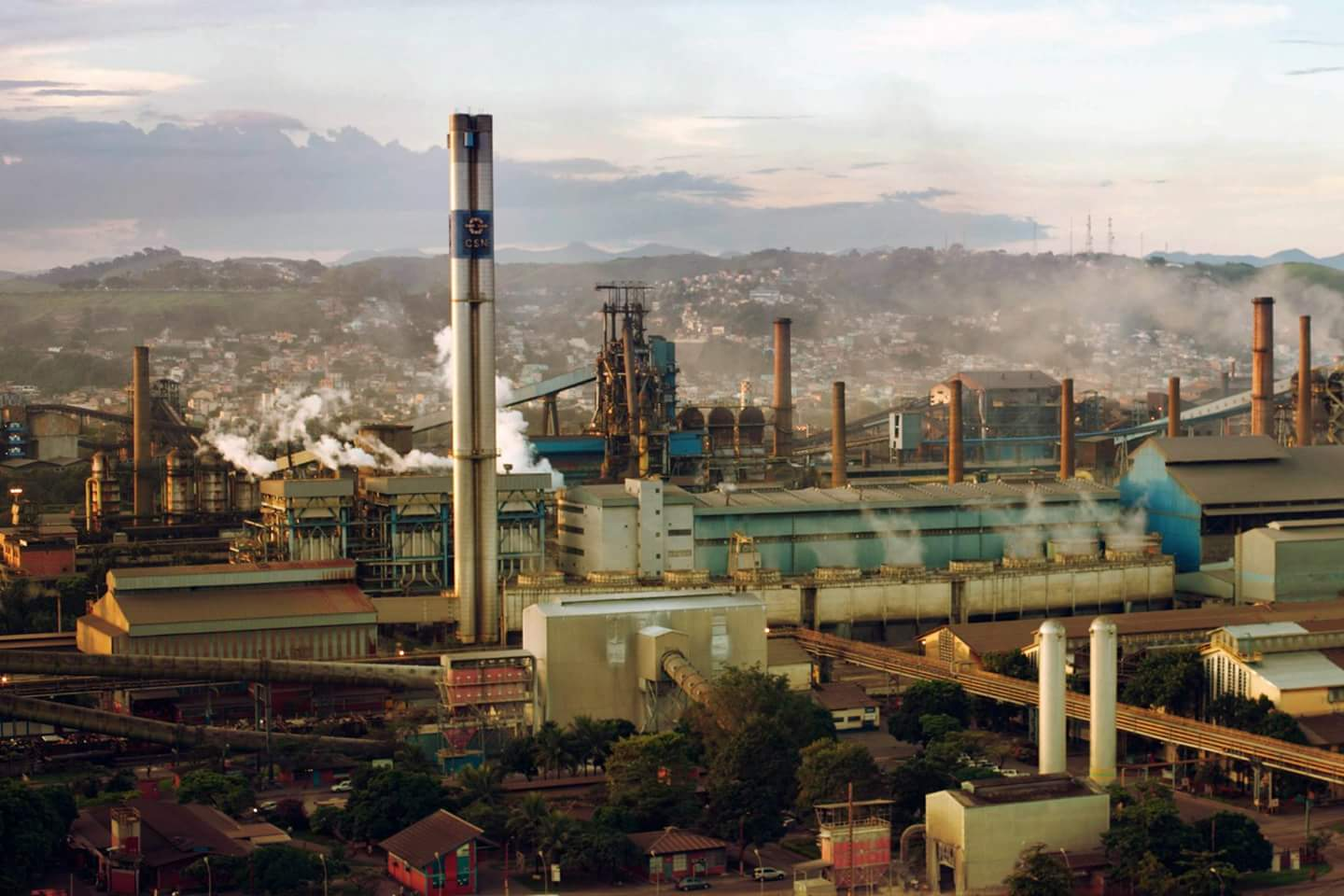
Steel-maker CSN, in Volta Redonda. Brazil is one of the 10 largest steel producers in the world, and Argentina is one of the 30 largest

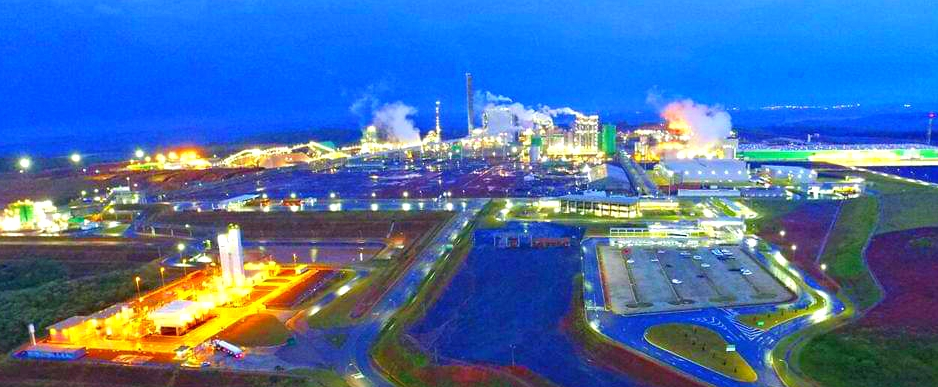
Klabin industrial complex, in Ortigueira. Brazil is the second largest pulp producer and the eighth largest paper producer in the world

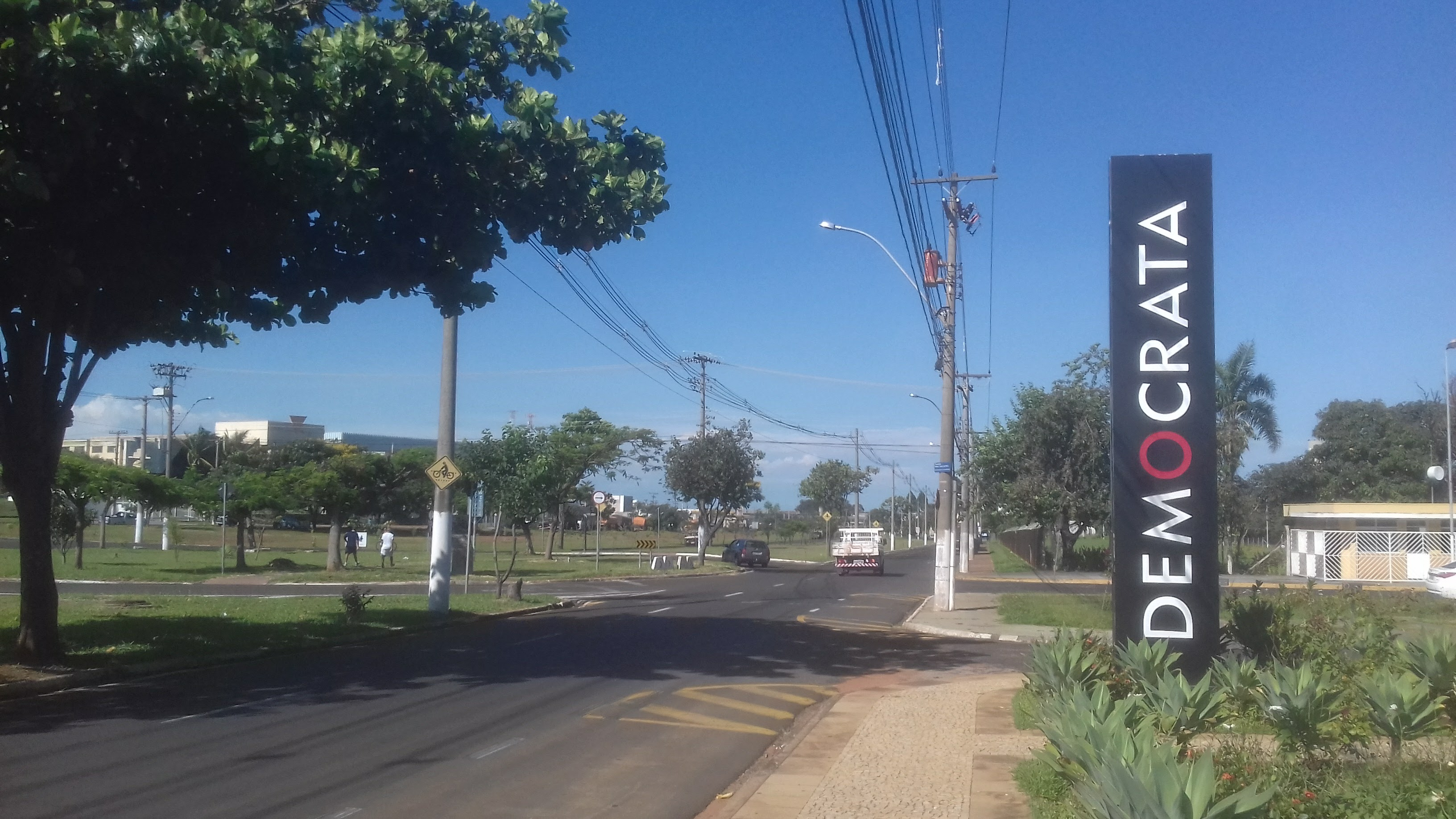
Portico of the Democrata men's shoe factory, in Franca. Brazil is the fourth largest shoe manufacturer in the world.

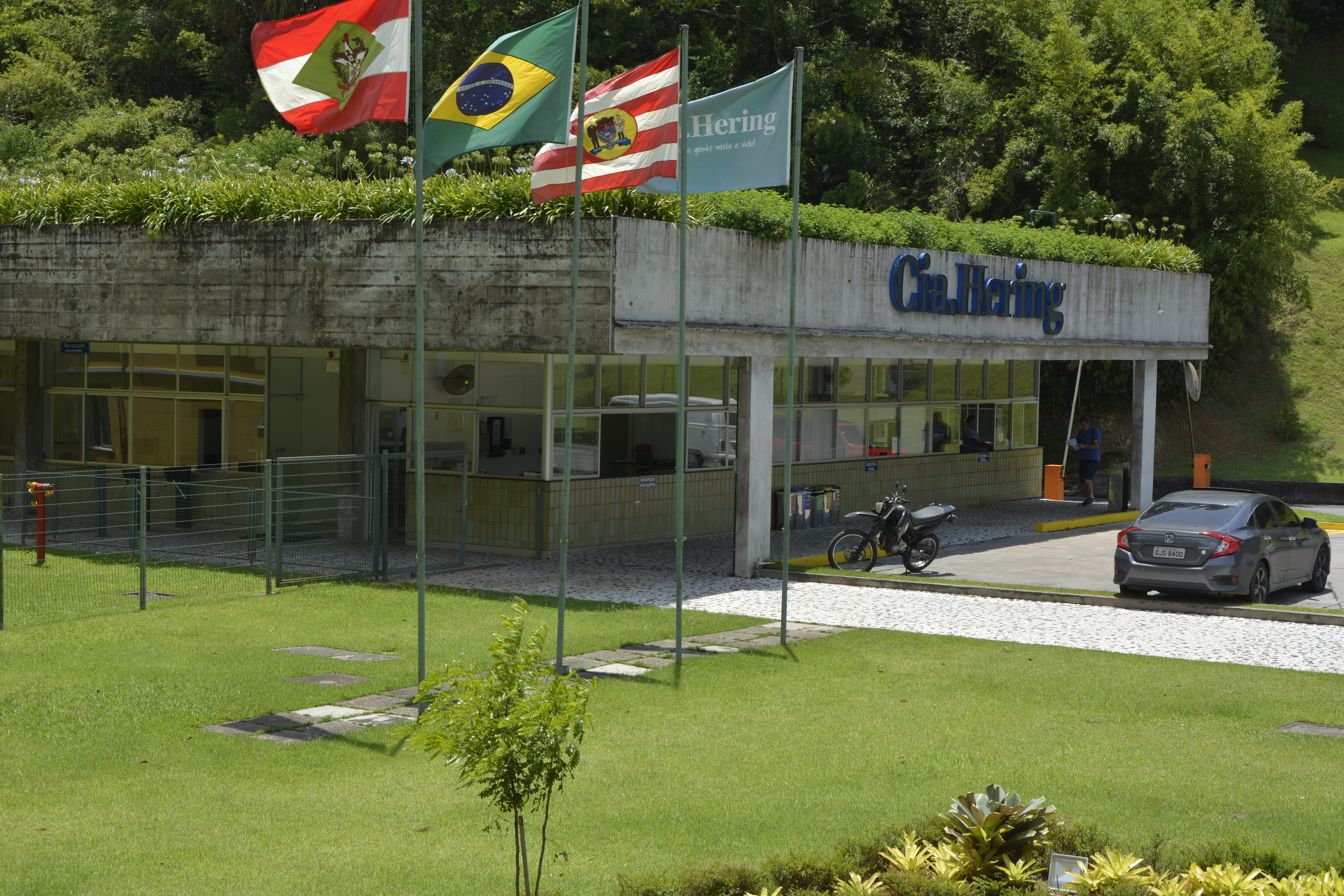
Hering, in Santa Catarina, Brazil. The country has one of the 5 largest textile industries in the world

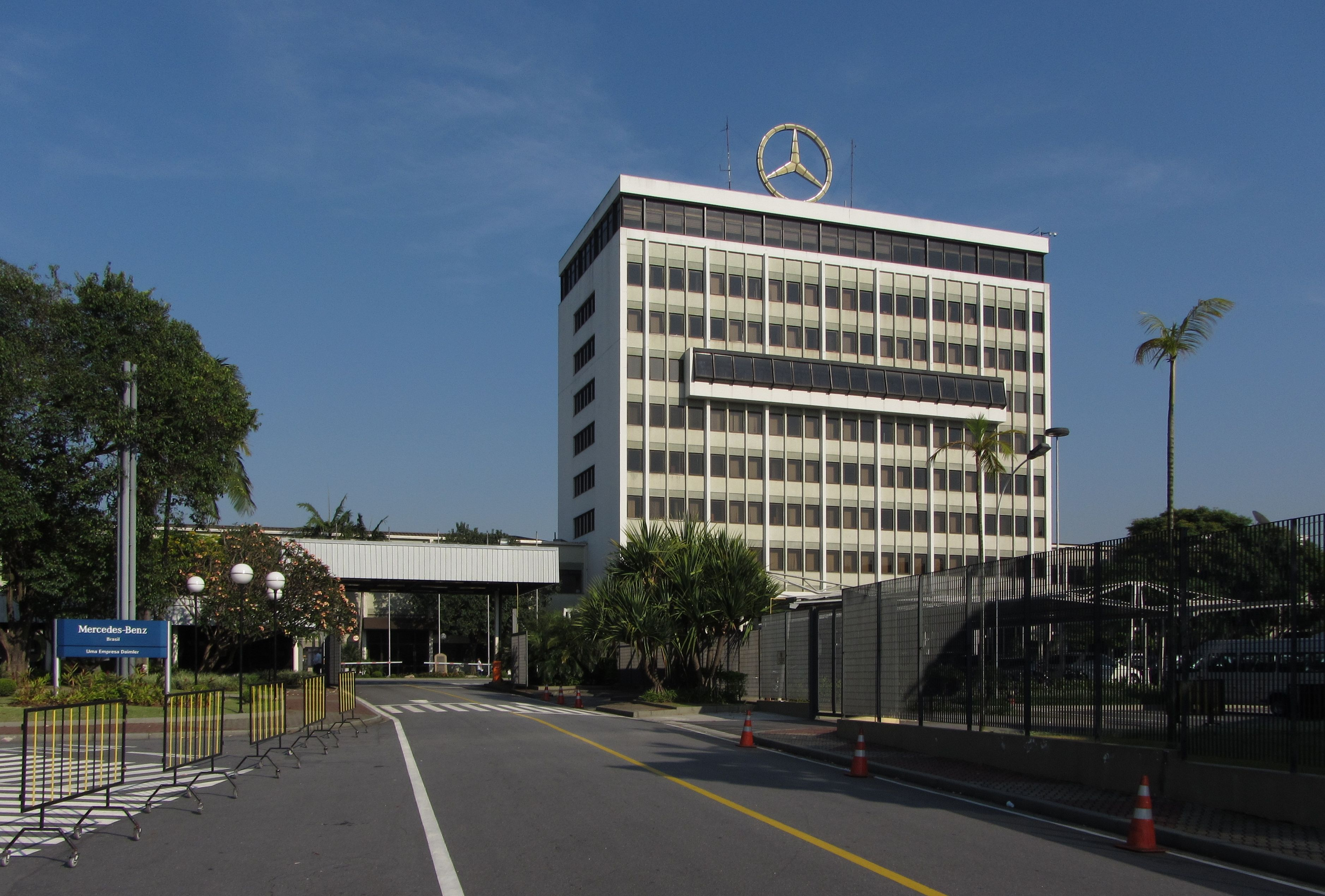
Mercedes-Benz plant in São Paulo. Mexico and Brazil are among the 10 largest vehicle manufacturers in the world and Argentina among the 30 largest.

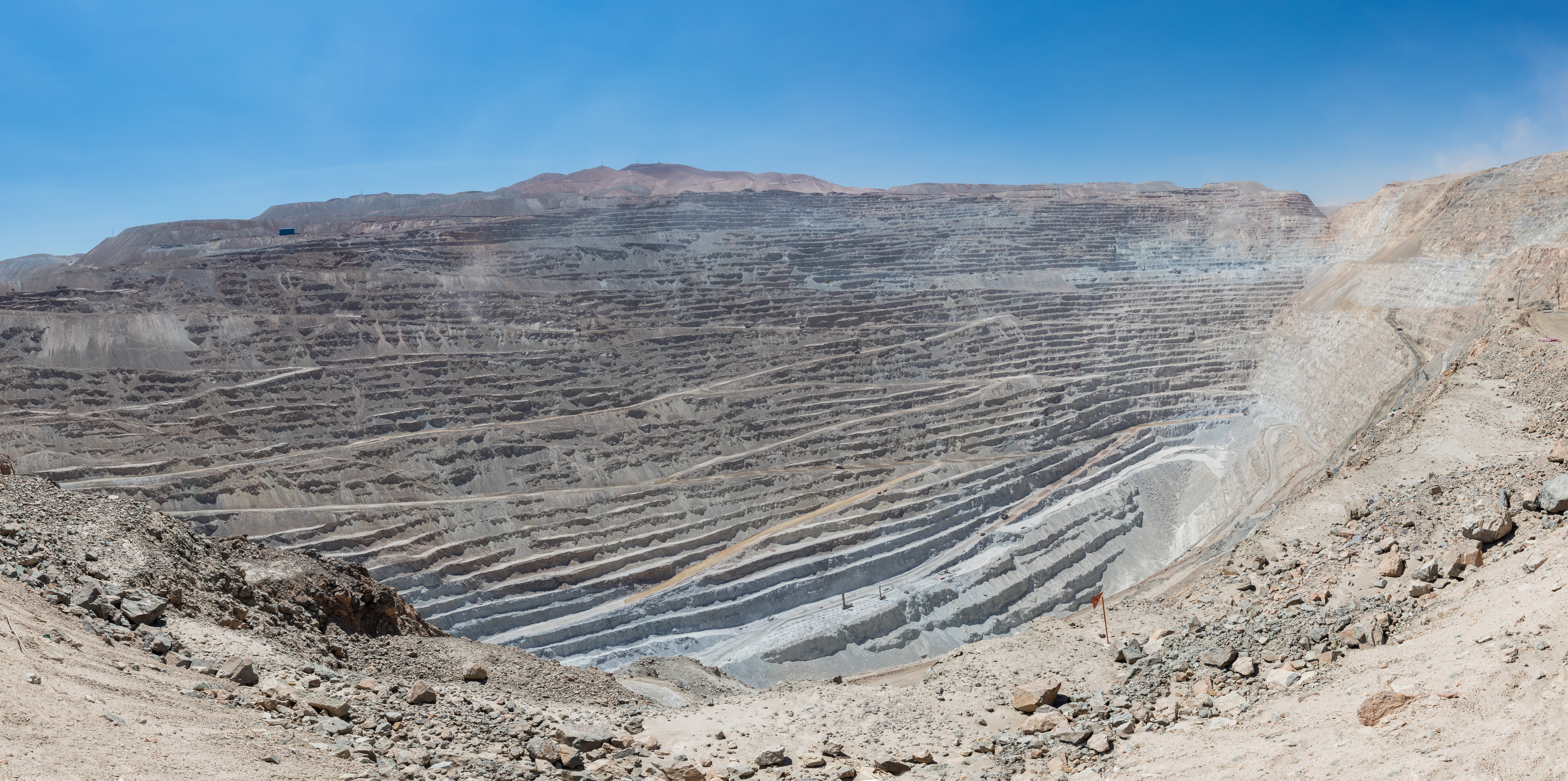
Copper mine in Chile. Latin America produces more than half of the world's copper

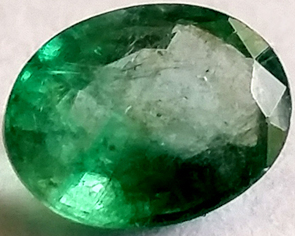
Colombian emerald. The country is the largest producer of emeralds in the world, and Brazil is one of the largest producers

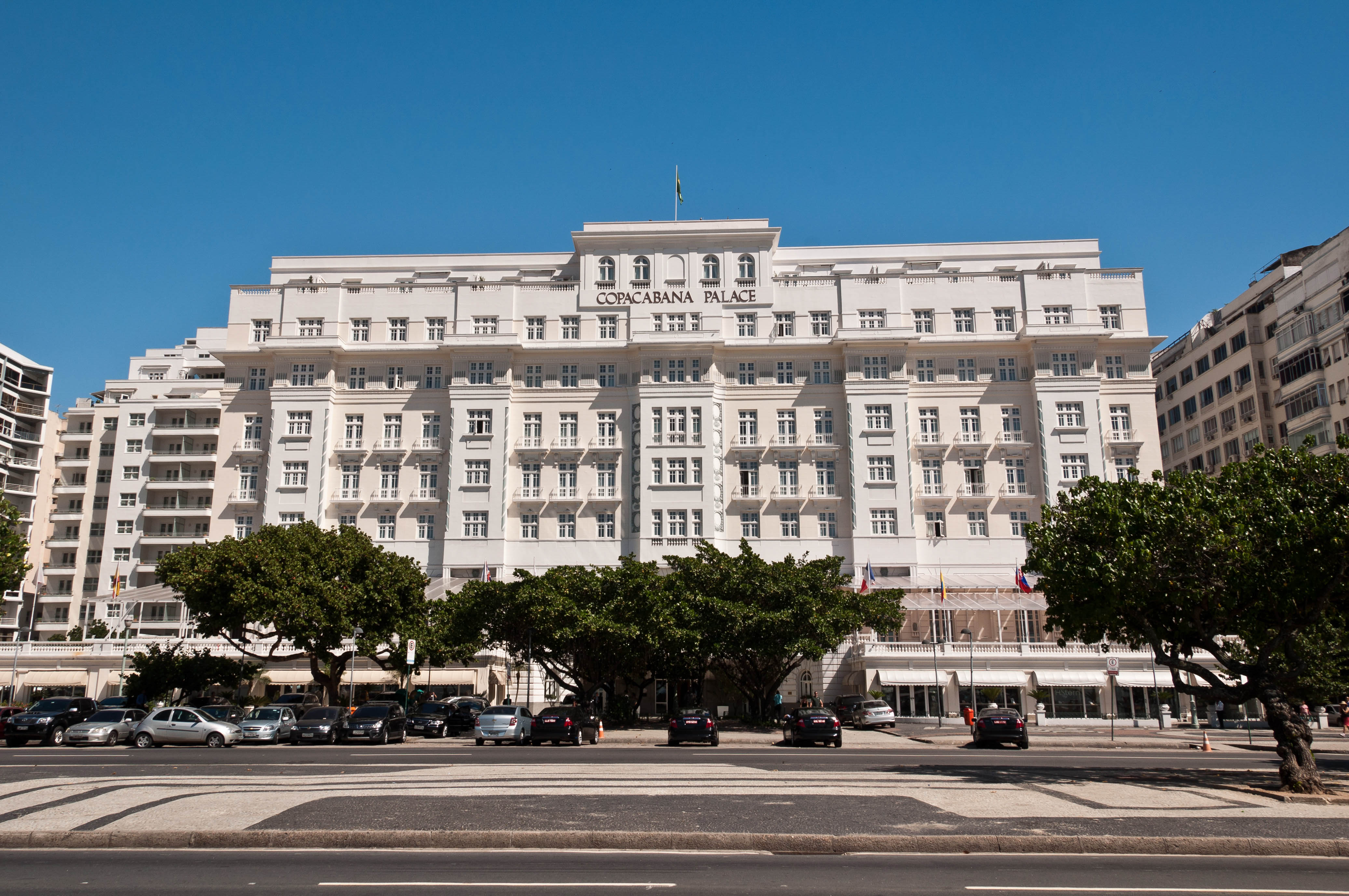
Copacabana Palace, the best hotel in South America, in Rio de Janeiro. Tourism brings important currencies to the continent.

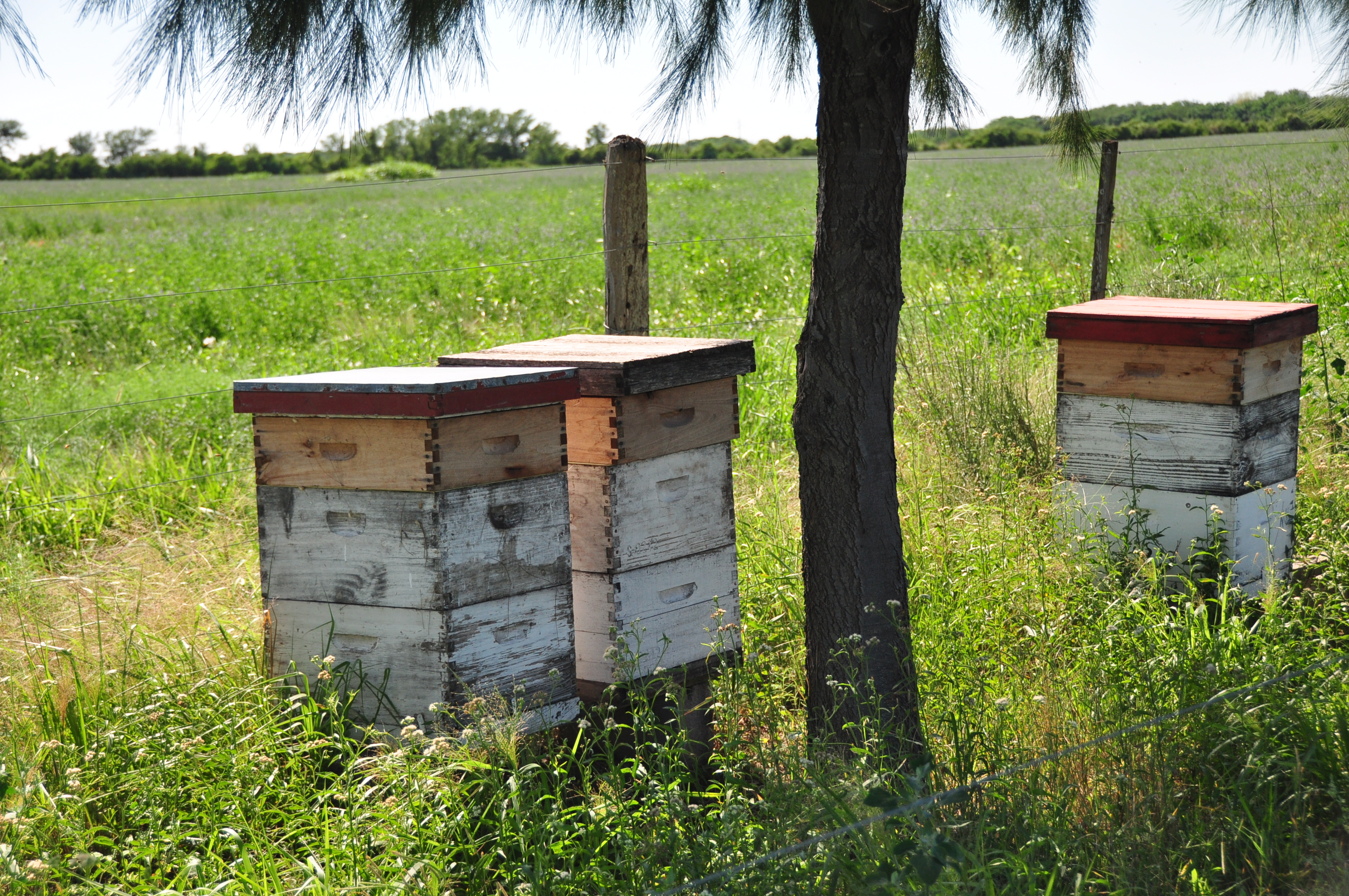
Honey production in Argentina. The country is the third largest producer of honey in the world.

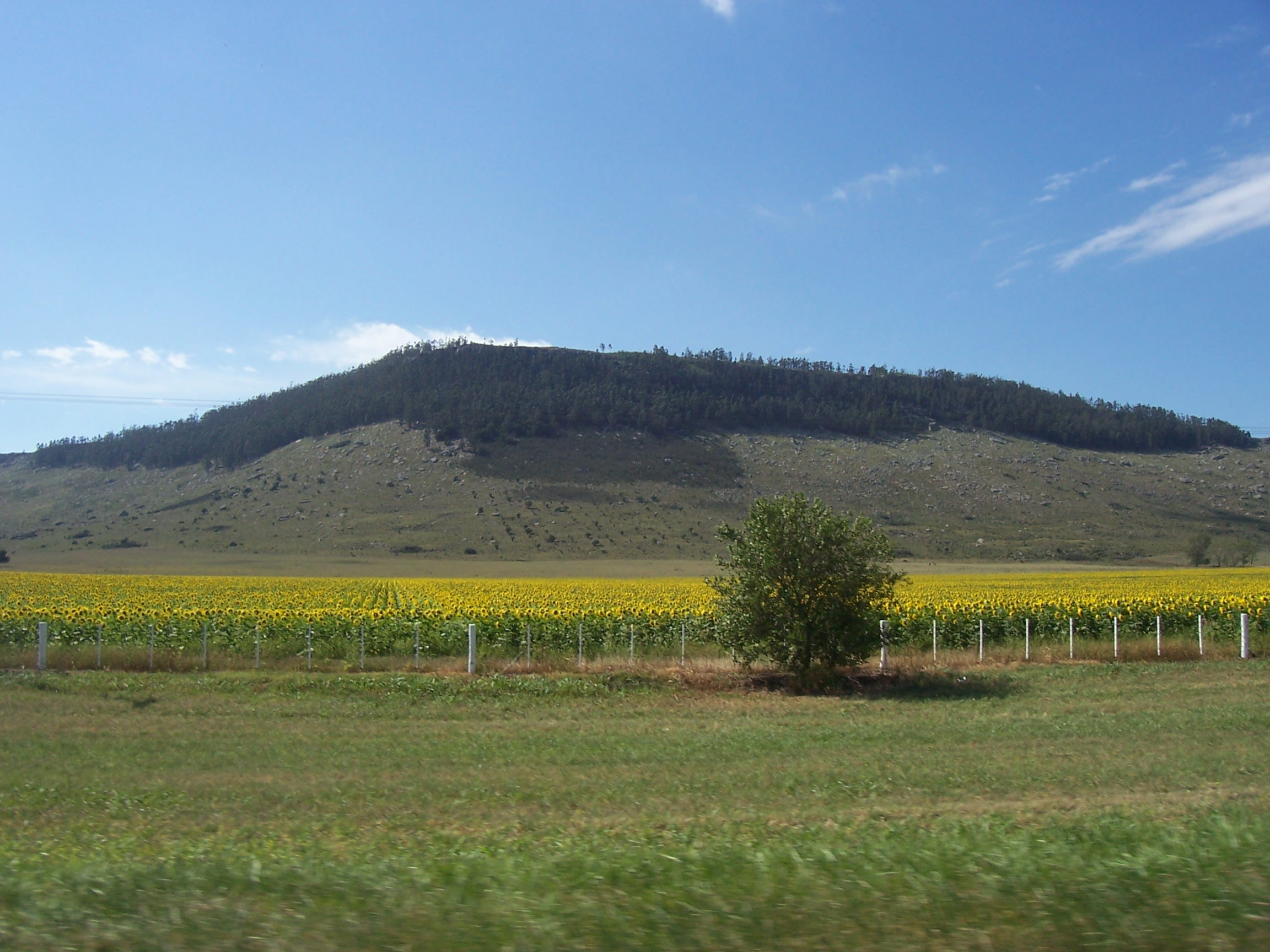
Sunflower plantation in Argentina. The country is the world's third largest producer of sunflower seed.

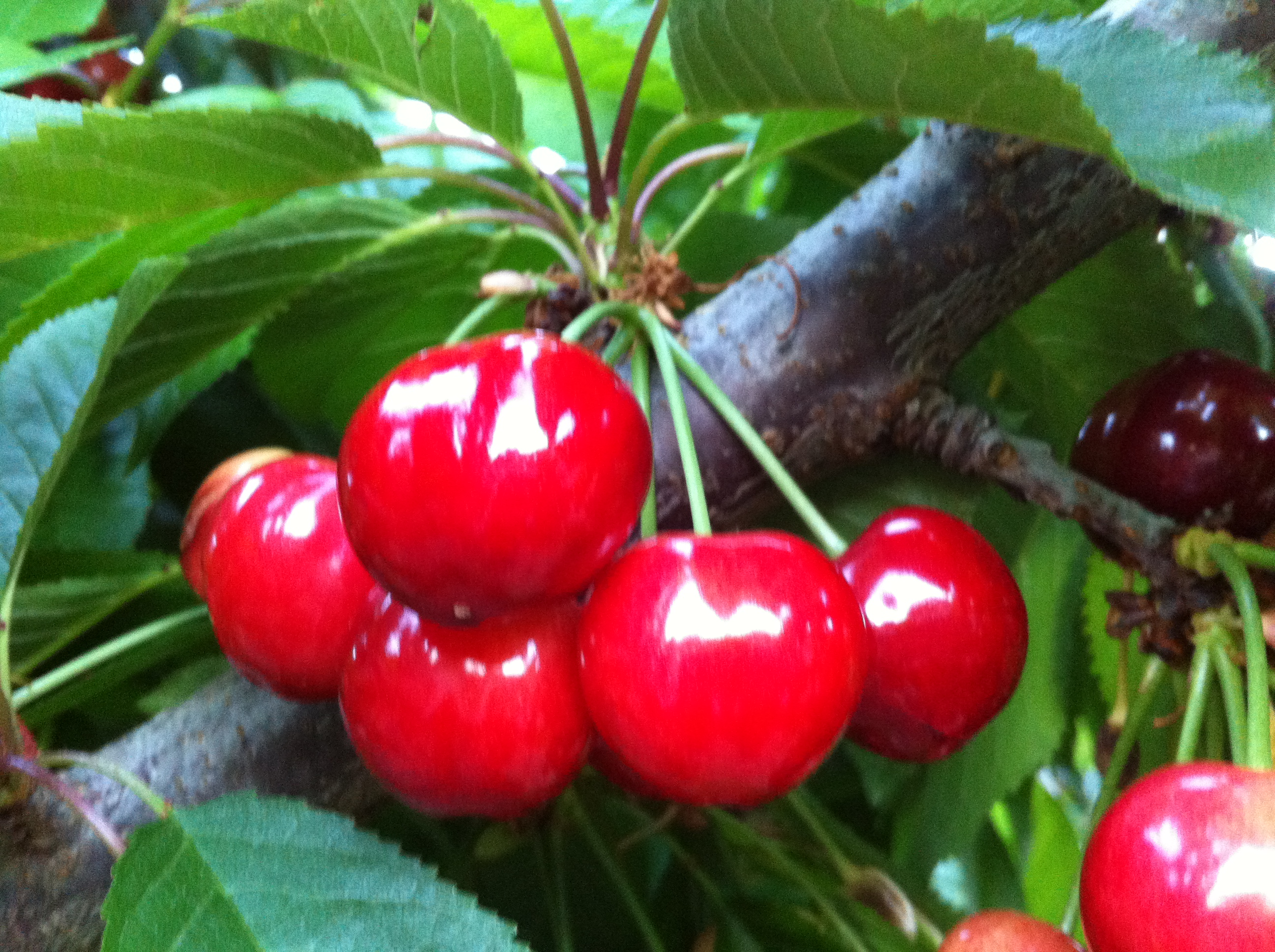
Chilean cherries. Chile is one of the top 5 producers of sweet cherries in the world.

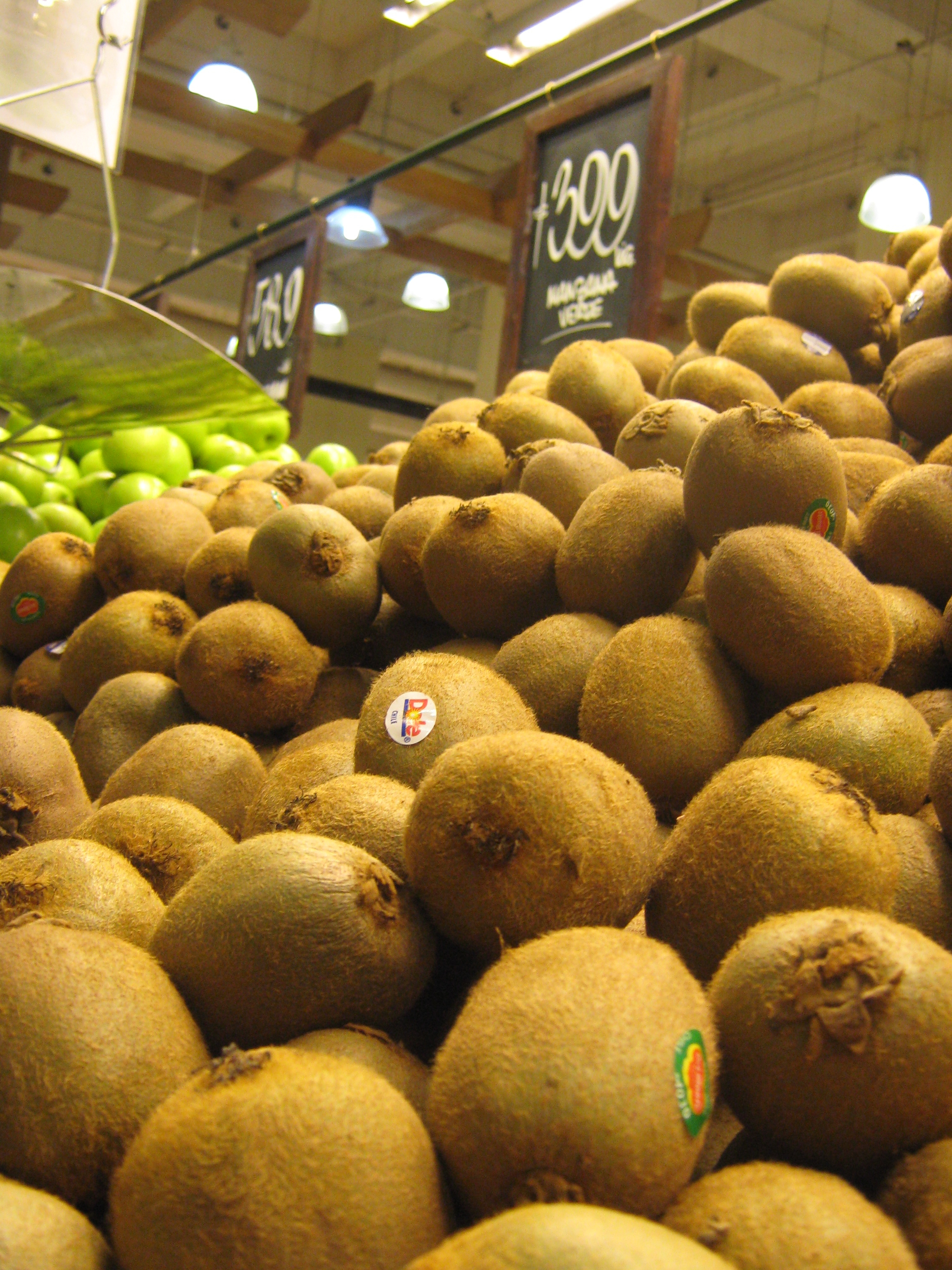
Chilean kiwi. The country is one of the 10 largest kiwi producers in the world.

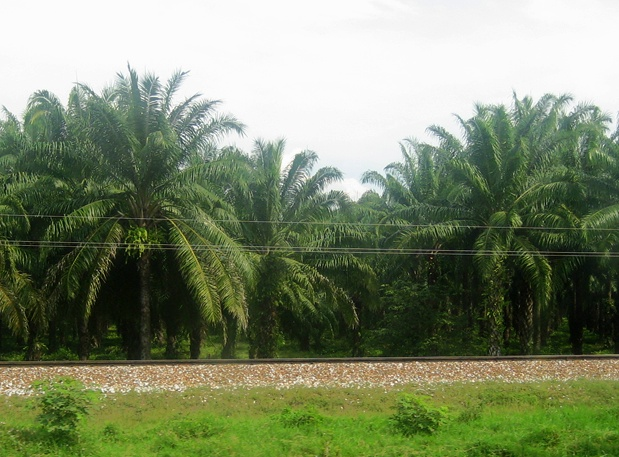
Palm plantation in Magdalena. Colombia is one of the top 5 palm oil producers in the world.

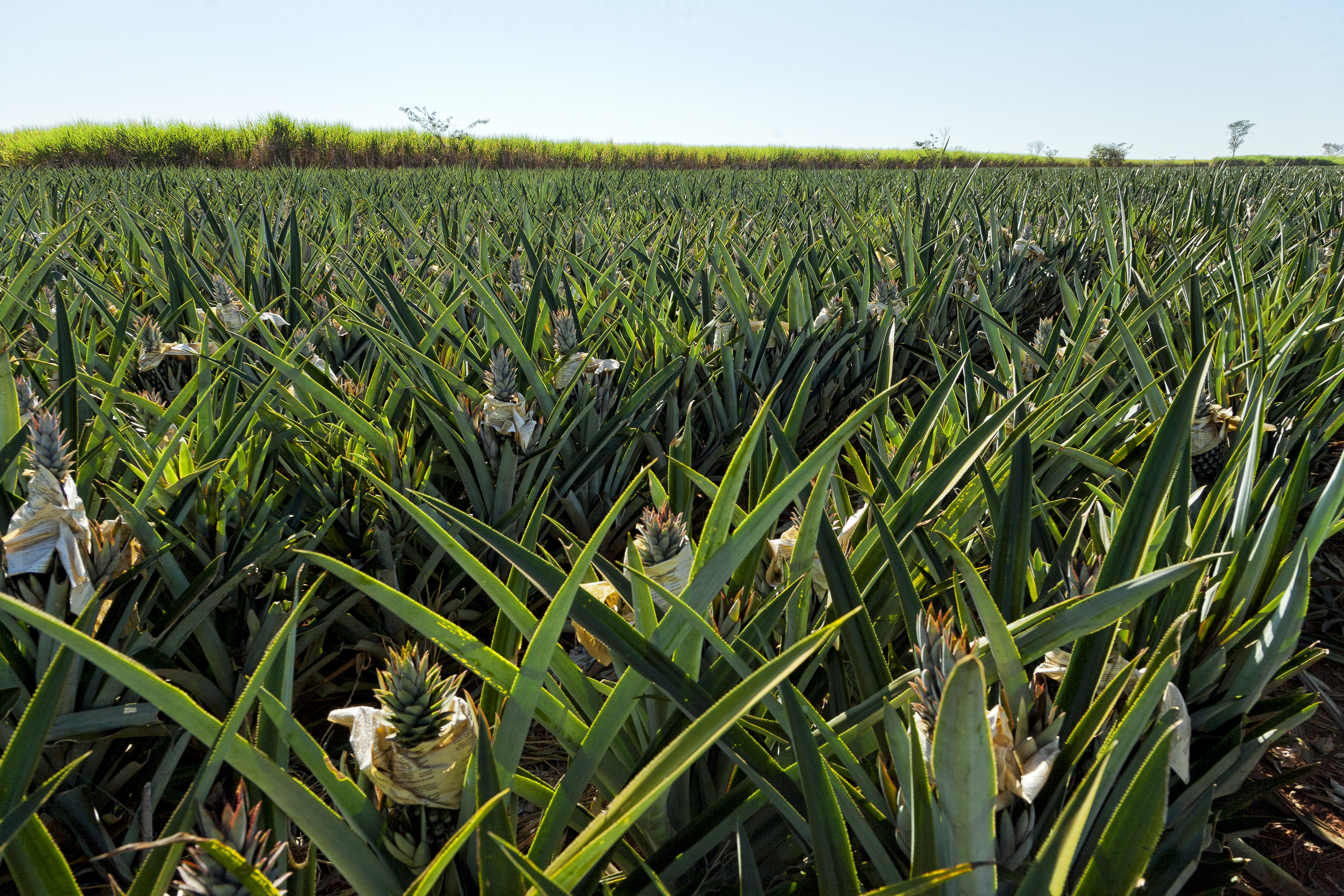
Pineapple in Brazil. The country is the 3rd largest producer in the world. South America produces close to 20% of the world's pineapple.

== Transport ==
=== Roads and highways ===
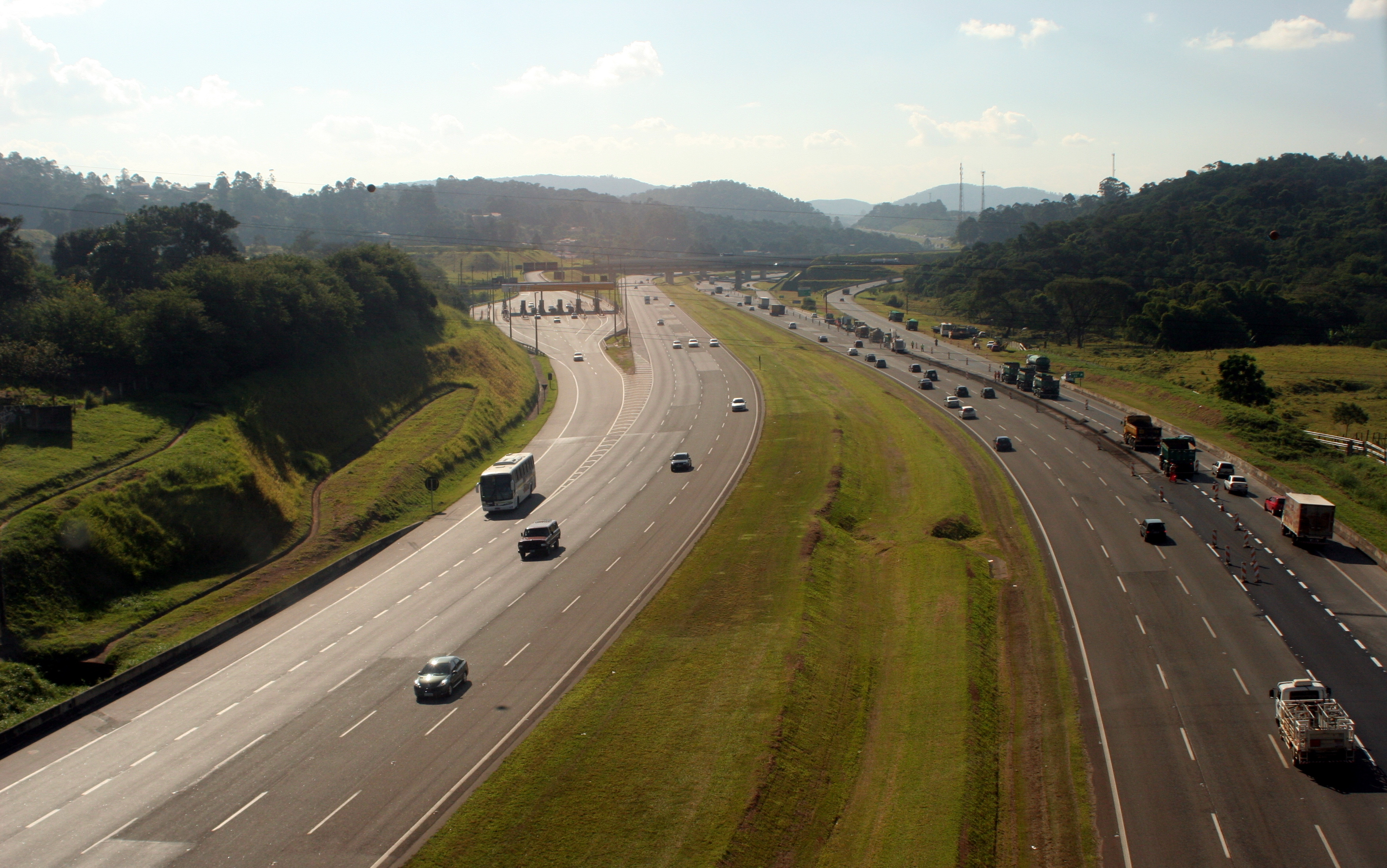
Rodovia dos Bandeirantes, Brazil

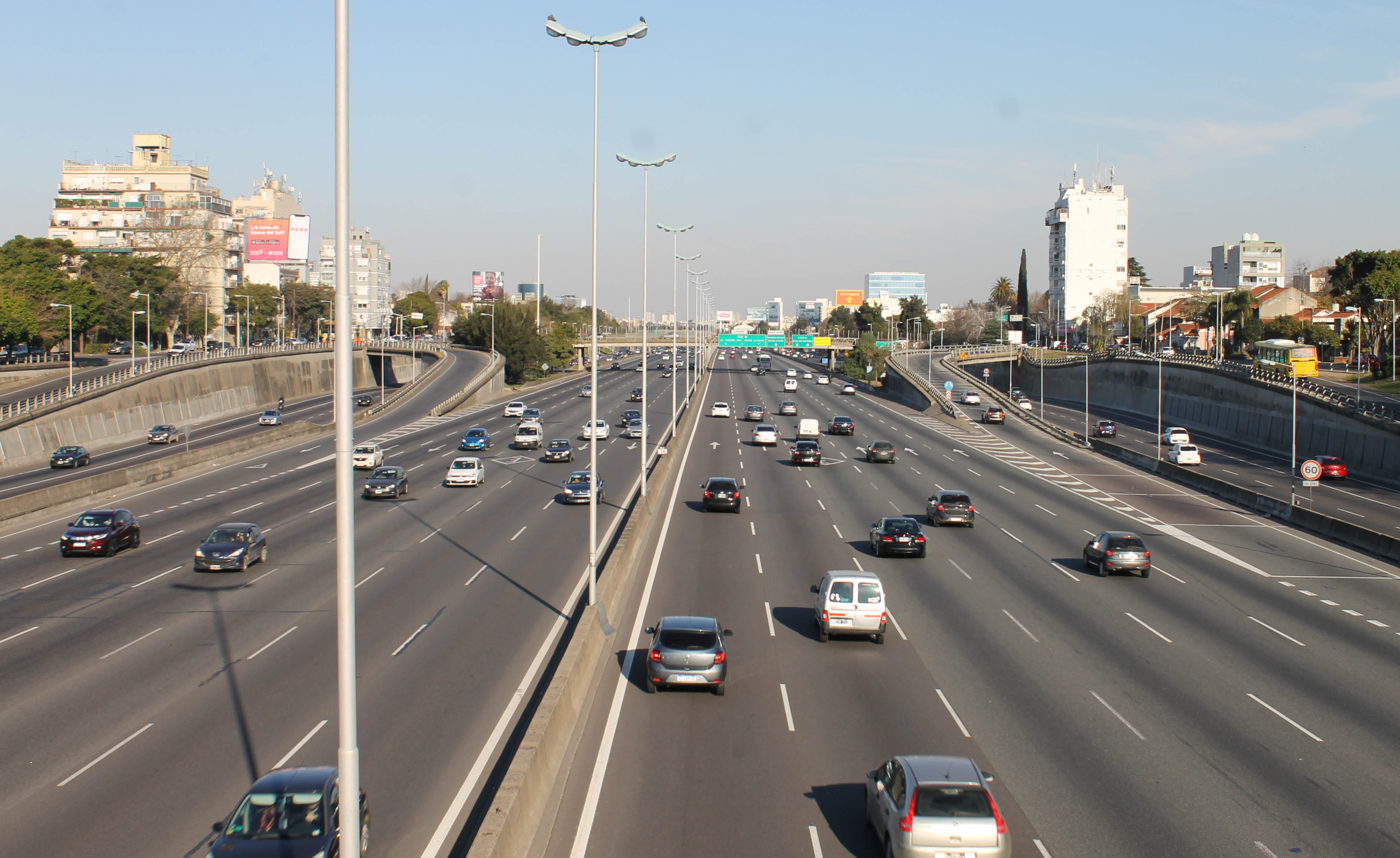
Panamericana Highway, Argentina

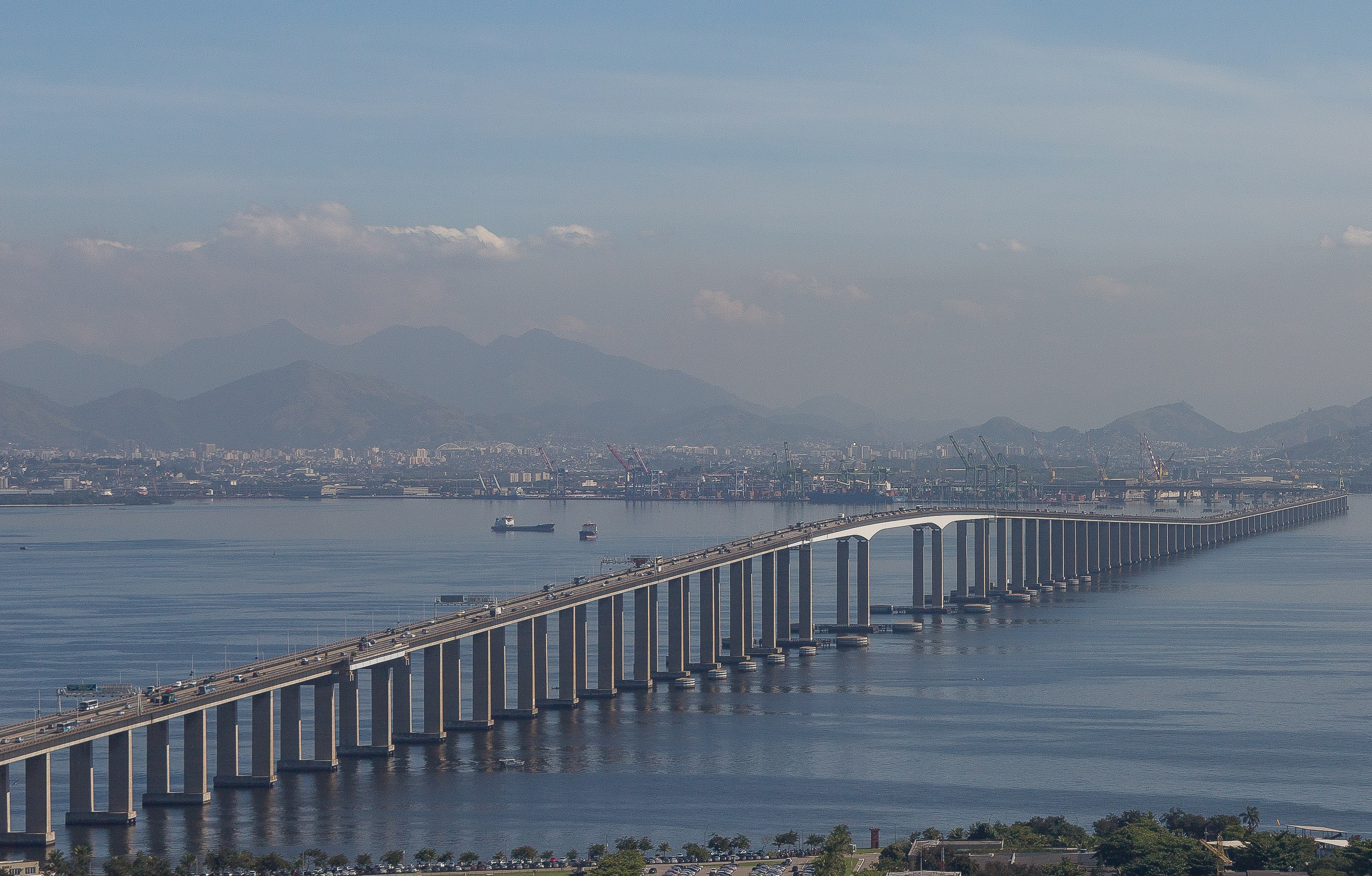
Rio–Niterói Bridge

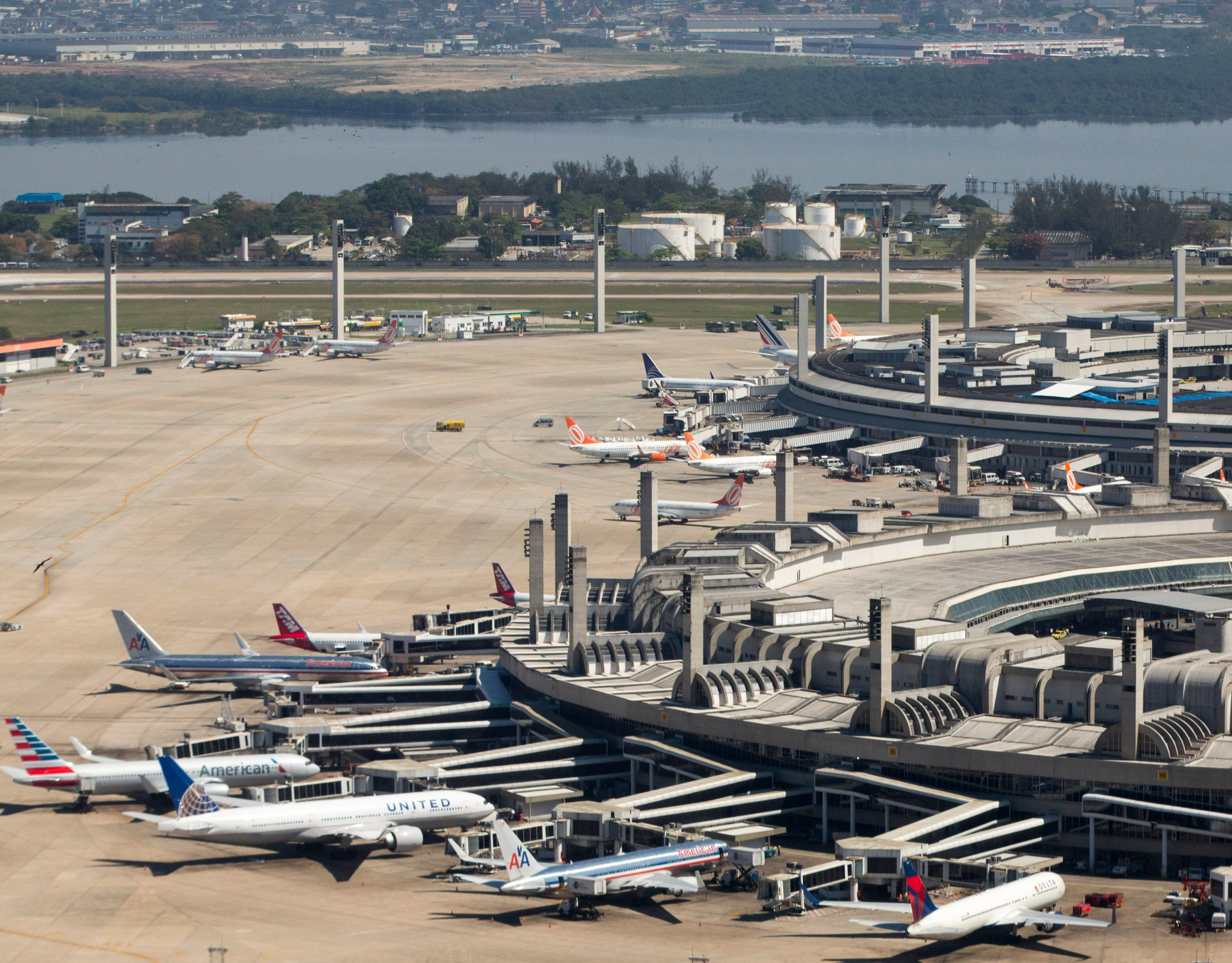
Rio de Janeiro International Airport

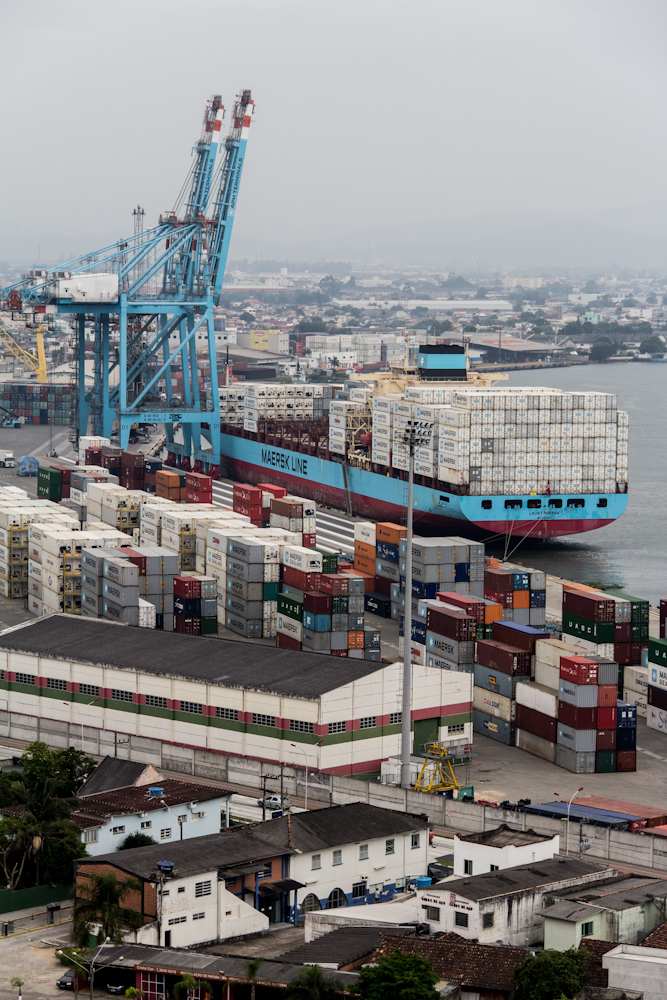
Port of Itajaí, Santa Catarina, Brazil

Transport in South America is basically carried out using the road mode, the most developed in the region. There is also a considerable infrastructure of ports and airports. The railway and fluvial sector, although it has potential, is usually treated in a secondary way.

Brazil has more than 1.7 million km of roads, of which 215,000 km are paved, and about 14,000 km are divided highways. The two most important highways in the country are BR-101 and BR-116. Argentina has more than 600,000 km of roads, of which about 70,000 km are paved, and about 2,500 km are divided highways. The three most important highways in the country are Route 9, Route 7 and Route 14. Colombia has about 210,000 km of roads, and about 2,300 km are divided highways. Chile has about 82,000 km of roads, 20,000 km of which are paved, and about 2,000 km are divided highways. The most important highway in the country is the Route 5 (Pan-American Highway) These 4 countries are the ones with the best road infrastructure and with the largest number of double-lane highways.

Due to the Andes Mountains, Amazon River and Amazon Forest, there have always been difficulties in implementing transcontinental or bioceanic highways. Practically the only route that existed was the one that connected Brazil to Buenos Aires, in Argentina and later to Santiago, in Chile. However, in recent years, with the combined effort of countries, new routes have started to emerge, such as Brazil-Peru (Interoceanic Highway), and a new highway between Brazil, Paraguay, northern Argentina and northern Chile (Bioceanic Corridor).

=== Airports ===
There are more than 2,000 airports in Brazil. The country has the second largest number of airports in the world, behind only the United States. São Paulo International Airport, located in the Metropolitan Region of São Paulo, is the largest and busiest in the country – the airport connects São Paulo to practically all major cities around the world. Brazil has 44 international airports, such as those in Rio de Janeiro, Brasília, Belo Horizonte, Porto Alegre, Florianópolis, Cuiabá, Salvador, Recife, Fortaleza, Belém and Manaus, among others. Argentina has important international airports such as Buenos Aires, Cordoba, Bariloche, Mendoza, Salta, Puerto Iguazú, Neuquén and Usuhaia, among others. Chile has important international airports such as Santiago, Antofagasta, Puerto Montt, Punta Arenas and Iquique, among others. Colombia has important international airports such as Bogotá, Medellín, Cartagena, Cali and Barranquilla, among others. Other important airports are those in the capitals of Uruguay (Montevideo), Paraguay (Asunción), Peru (Lima), Bolivia (La Paz) and Ecuador (Quito). The 10 busiest airports in South America in 2017 were: São Paulo-Guarulhos (Brazil), Bogotá (Colombia), São Paulo-Congonhas (Brazil), Santiago (Chile), Lima (Peru), Brasília (Brazil), Rio de Janeiro (Brazil), Buenos Aires-Aeroparque (Argentina), Buenos Aires-Ezeiza (Argentina), and Minas Gerais (Brazil).

=== Ports ===
About ports, Brazil has some of the busiest ports in South America, such as Port of Santos, Port of Rio de Janeiro, Port of Paranaguá, Port of Itajaí, Port of Rio Grande, Port of São Francisco do Sul and Suape Port. Argentina has ports such as Port of Buenos Aires and Port of Rosario. Chile has important ports in Valparaíso, Caldera, Mejillones, Antofagasta, Iquique, Arica and Puerto Montt. Colombia has important ports such as Buenaventura, Cartagena Container Terminal and Puerto Bolivar. Peru has important ports in Callao, Ilo and Matarani. The 15 busiest ports in South America are: Port of Santos (Brazil), Port of Bahia de Cartagena (Colombia), Callao (Peru), Guayaquil (Ecuador), Buenos Aires (Argentina), San Antonio (Chile), Buenaventura (Colombia), Itajaí (Brazil), Valparaíso (Chile), Montevideo (Uruguay), Paranaguá (Brazil), Rio Grande (Brazil), São Francisco do Sul (Brazil), Manaus (Brazil) and Coronel (Chile).

=== Railways ===
The Brazilian railway network has an extension of about 30,000 kilometers. It's basically used for transporting ores. The Argentine rail network, with 47,000 km of tracks, was one of the largest in the world and continues to be the most extensive in Latin America. It came to have about 100,000 km of rails, but the lifting of tracks and the emphasis placed on motor transport gradually reduced it. It has four different trails and international connections with Paraguay, Bolivia, Chile, Brazil and Uruguay. Chile has almost 7,000 km of railways, with connections to Argentina, Bolivia and Peru. Colombia has only about 3,500 km of railways.

=== Waterways ===
Among the main Brazilian waterways, two stand out: Hidrovia Tietê-Paraná (which has a length of 2,400 km, 1,600 on the Paraná River and 800 km on the Tietê River, draining agricultural production from the states of Mato Grosso, Mato Grosso do Sul, Goiás and part of Rondônia, Tocantins and Minas Gerais) and Hidrovia do Solimões-Amazonas (it has two sections: Solimões, which extends from Tabatinga to Manaus, with approximately 1600 km, and Amazonas, which extends from Manaus to Belém, with 1650 km. Almost entirely passenger transport from the Amazon plain is done by this waterway, in addition to practically all cargo transportation that is directed to the major regional centers of Belém and Manaus). In Brazil, this transport is still underutilized: the most important waterway stretches, from an economic point of view, are found in the Southeast and South of the country. Its full use still depends on the construction of locks, major dredging works and, mainly, of ports that allow intermodal integration. In Argentina, the waterway network is made up of the La Plata, Paraná, Paraguay and Uruguay rivers. The main river ports are Zárate and Campana. The port of Buenos Aires is historically the first in individual importance, but the area known as Up-River, which stretches along 67 km of the Santa Fé portion of the Paraná River, brings together 17 ports that concentrate 50% of the total exports of the country.

== Energy ==
=== Brazil ===
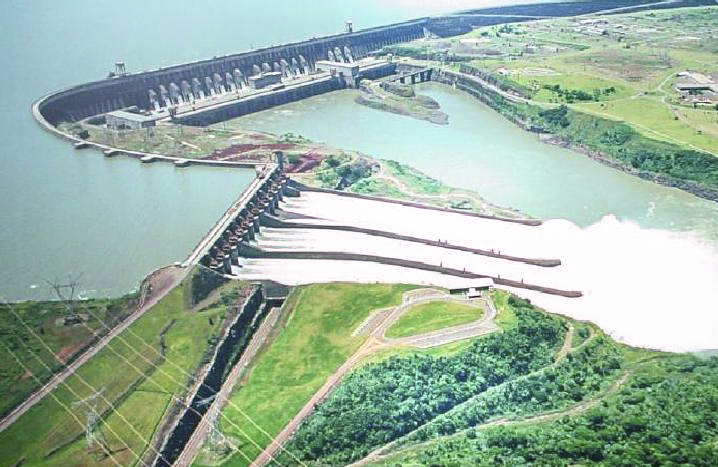
Itaipu Dam in Paraná.

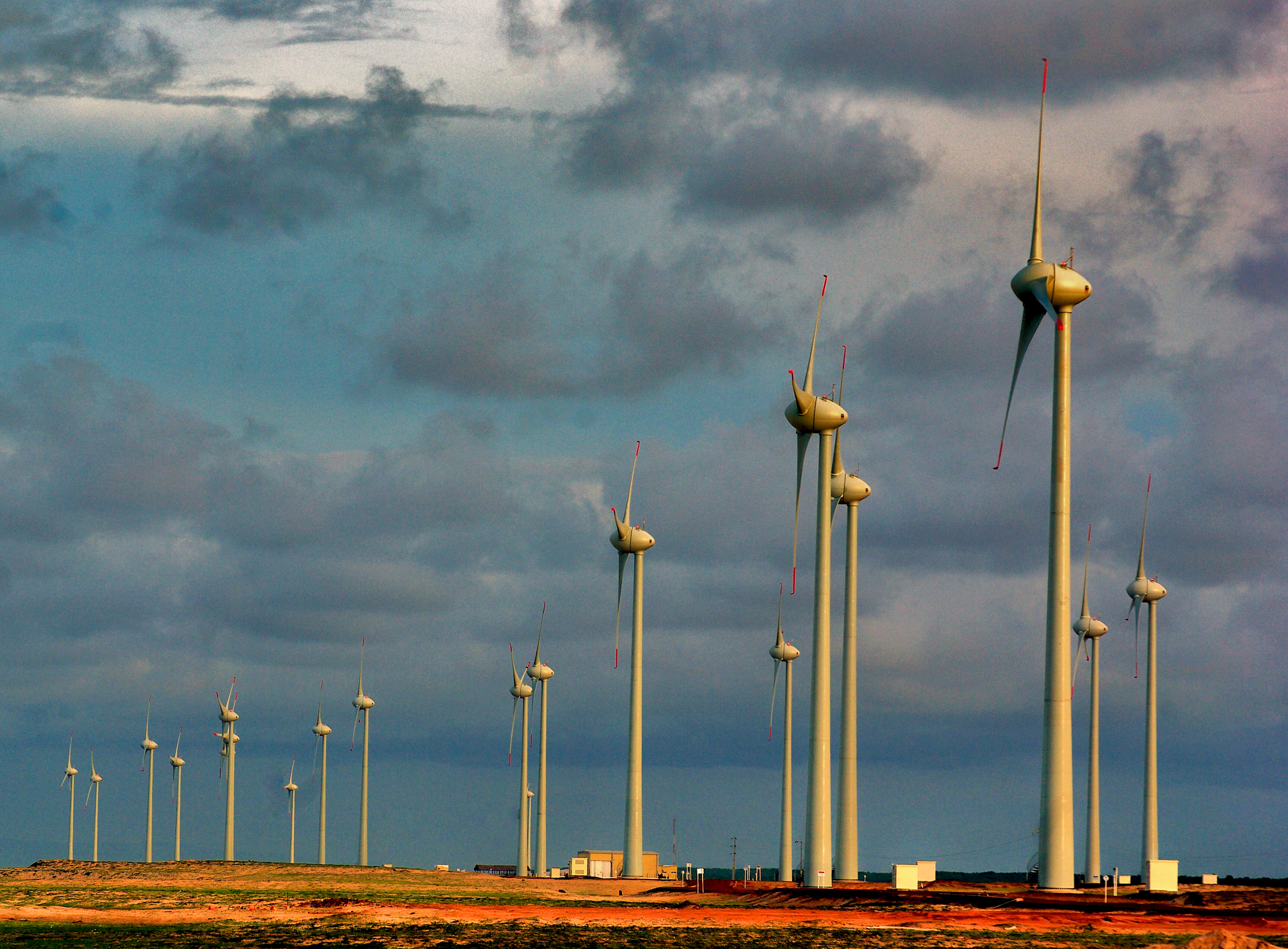
Wind power in Parnaíba.

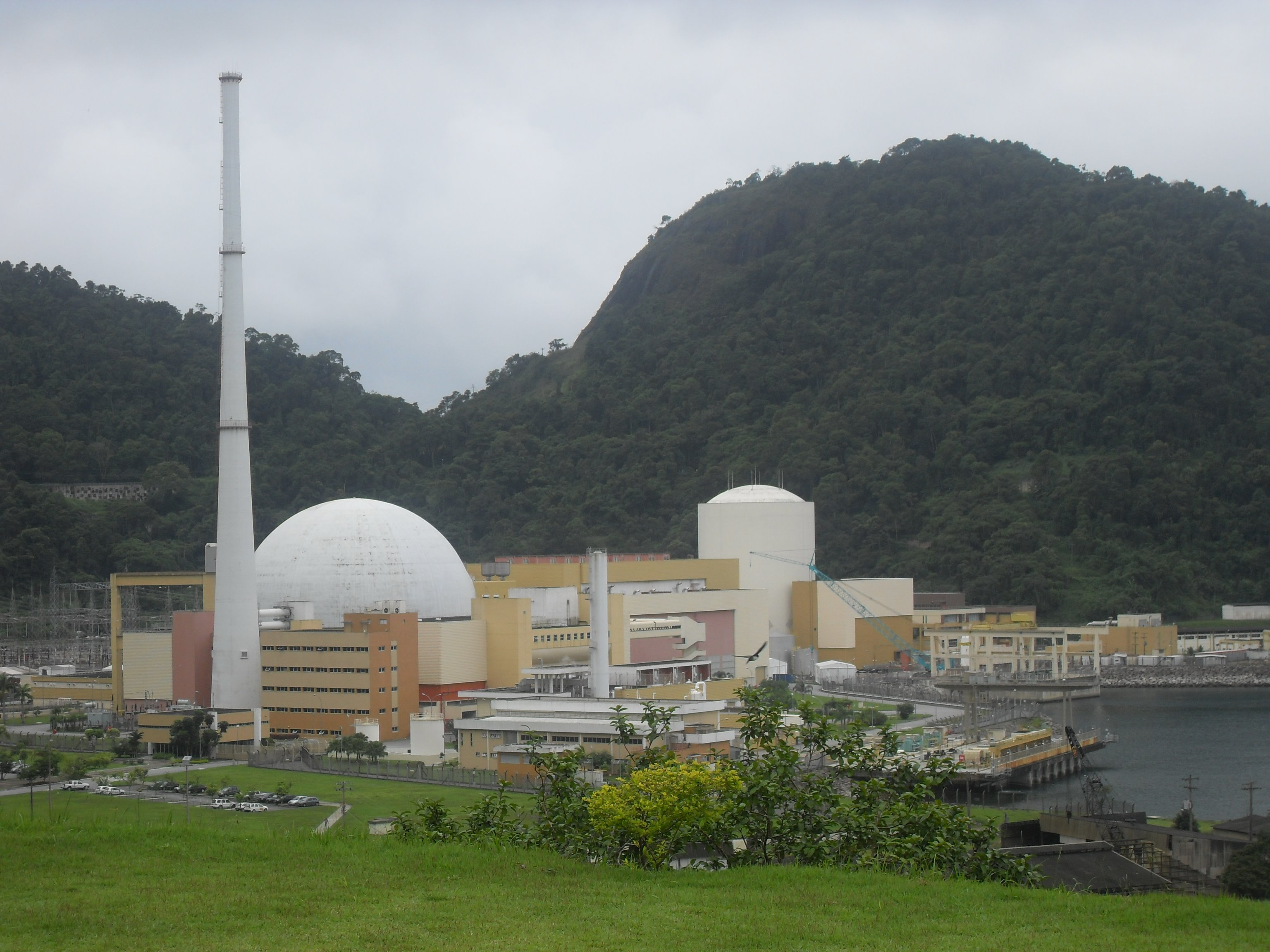
Angra Nuclear Power Plant in Angra dos Reis, Rio de Janeiro

The Brazilian government has undertaken an ambitious program to reduce dependence on imported petroleum. Imports previously accounted for more than 70% of the country's oil needs but Brazil became self-sufficient in oil in 2006–2007. Brazil was the 10th largest oil producer in the world in 2019, with 2.8 million barrels / day. Production manages to supply the country's demand. In the beginning of 2020, in the production of oil and natural gas, the country exceeded 4 million barrels of oil equivalent per day, for the first time. In January this year, 3.168 million barrels of oil per day and 138.753 million cubic meters of natural gas were extracted.

Brazil is one of the main world producers of hydroelectric power. In 2019, Brazil had 217 hydroelectric plants in operation, with an installed capacity of 98,581 MW, 60.16% of the country's energy generation. In the total generation of electricity, in 2019 Brazil reached 170,000 megawatts of installed capacity, more than 75% from renewable sources (the majority, hydroelectric).

In 2013, the Southeast Region used about 50% of the load of the National Integrated System (SIN), being the main energy consuming region in the country. The region's installed electricity generation capacity totaled almost 42,500 MW, which represented about a third of Brazil's generation capacity. The hydroelectric generation represented 58% of the region's installed capacity, with the remaining 42% corresponding basically to the thermoelectric generation. São Paulo accounted for 40% of this capacity; Minas Gerais by about 25%; Rio de Janeiro by 13.3%; and Espírito Santo accounted for the rest. The South Region owns the Itaipu Dam, which was the largest hydroelectric plant in the world for several years, until the inauguration of Three Gorges Dam in China. It remains the second largest operating hydroelectric in the world. Brazil is the co-owner of the Itaipu Plant with Paraguay: the dam is located on the Paraná River, located on the border between countries. It has an installed generation capacity of 14 GW for 20 generating units of 700 MW each. North Region has large hydroelectric plants, such as Belo Monte Dam and Tucuruí Dam, which produce much of the national energy. Brazil's hydroelectric potential has not yet been fully exploited, so the country still has the capacity to build several renewable energy plants in its territory.

As of July 2022, according to ONS, total installed capacity of wind power was 22 GW, with average capacity factor of 58%. While the world average wind production capacity factors is 24.7%, there are areas in Northern Brazil, specially in Bahia State, where some wind farms record with average capacity factors over 60%; the average capacity factor in the Northeast Region is 45% in the coast and 49% in the interior. In 2019, wind energy represented 9% of the energy generated in the country. In 2019, it was estimated that the country had an estimated wind power generation potential of around 522 GW (this, only onshore), enough energy to meet three times the country's current demand. In 2021 Brazil was the 7th country in the world in terms of installed wind power (21 GW), and the 4th largest producer of wind energy in the world (72 TWh), behind only China, USA and Germany.

Nuclear energy accounts for about 4% of Brazil's electricity. The nuclear power generation monopoly is owned by Eletronuclear (Eletrobrás Eletronuclear S/A), a wholly owned subsidiary of Eletrobrás. Nuclear energy is produced by two reactors at Angra. It is located at the Central Nuclear Almirante Álvaro Alberto (CNAAA) on the Praia de Itaorna in Angra dos Reis, Rio de Janeiro. It consists of two pressurized water reactors, Angra I, with capacity of 657 MW, connected to the power grid in 1982, and Angra II, with capacity of 1,350 MW, connected in 2000. A third reactor, Angra III, with a projected output of 1,350 MW, is planned to be finished.

As of October 2022, according to ONS, total installed capacity of photovoltaic solar was 21 GW, with average capacity factor of 23%. Some of the most irradiated Brazilian States are MG ("Minas Gerais"), BA ("Bahia") and GO (Goiás), which have indeed world irradiation level records. In 2019, solar power represented 1,27% of the energy generated in the country. In 2021, Brazil was the 14th country in the world in terms of installed solar power (13 GW), and the 11th largest producer of solar energy in the world (16.8 TWh).

In 2020, Brazil was the 2nd largest country in the world in the production of energy through biomass (energy production from solid biofuels and renewable waste), with 15,2 GW installed.

=== Other countries ===
After Brazil, Colombia is the country in South America that most stands out in energy production. In 2020, the country was the 20th largest petroleum producer in the world, and in 2015 it was the 19th largest exporter. In natural gas, the country was, in 2015, the 40th largest producer in the world. Colombia's biggest highlight is in coal, where the country was, in 2018, the world's 12th largest producer and the 5th largest exporter. In renewable energies, in 2020, the country ranked 45th in the world in terms of installed wind energy (0.5 GW), 76th in the world in terms of installed solar energy (0.1 GW) and 20th in the world in terms of installed hydroelectric power (12.6 GW). Venezuela, which was one of the world's largest oil producers (about 2.5 million barrels/day in 2015) and one of the largest exporters, due to its political problems, has had its production drastically reduced in recent years: in 2016, it dropped to 2.2 million, in 2017 to 2 million, in 2018 to 1.4 million and in 2019 to 877 thousand, reaching only 300,000 barrels/day at a given point. The country also stands out in hydroelectricity, where it was the 14th country in the world in terms of installed capacity in 2020 (16,5 GW). Argentina was, in 2017, the 18th largest producer in the world, and the largest producer in Latin America, of natural gas, in addition to being the 28th largest oil producer; although the country has the Vaca Muerta field, which holds close to 16 billion barrels of technically recoverable shale oil, and is the second largest shale natural gas deposit in the world, the country lacks the capacity to exploit the deposit: it is necessary capital, technology and knowledge that can only come from offshore energy companies, who view Argentina and its erratic economic policies with considerable suspicion, not wanting to invest in the country. In renewable energies, in 2020, the country ranked 27th in the world in terms of installed wind energy (2.6 GW), 42nd in the world in terms of installed solar energy (0.7 GW) and 21st in the world in terms of installed hydroelectric power (11.3 GW). The country has great future potential for the production of wind energy in the Patagonia region. Chile, although currently not a major energy producer, has great future potential for solar energy production in the Atacama Desert region. Paraguay stands out today in hydroelectric production thanks to the Itaipu Power Plant. Bolivia stands out in the production of natural gas, where it was the 31st largest in the world in 2015. Ecuador, because it consumes little energy, is part of OPEC and was the 27th largest oil producer in the world in 2020, being the 22nd largest exporter in 2014.

== See also ==
- Latin American economy
- List of Latin American and Caribbean countries by GDP (nominal)
- List of Latin American and Caribbean countries by GDP (PPP)
