= Banana production in Ecuador =

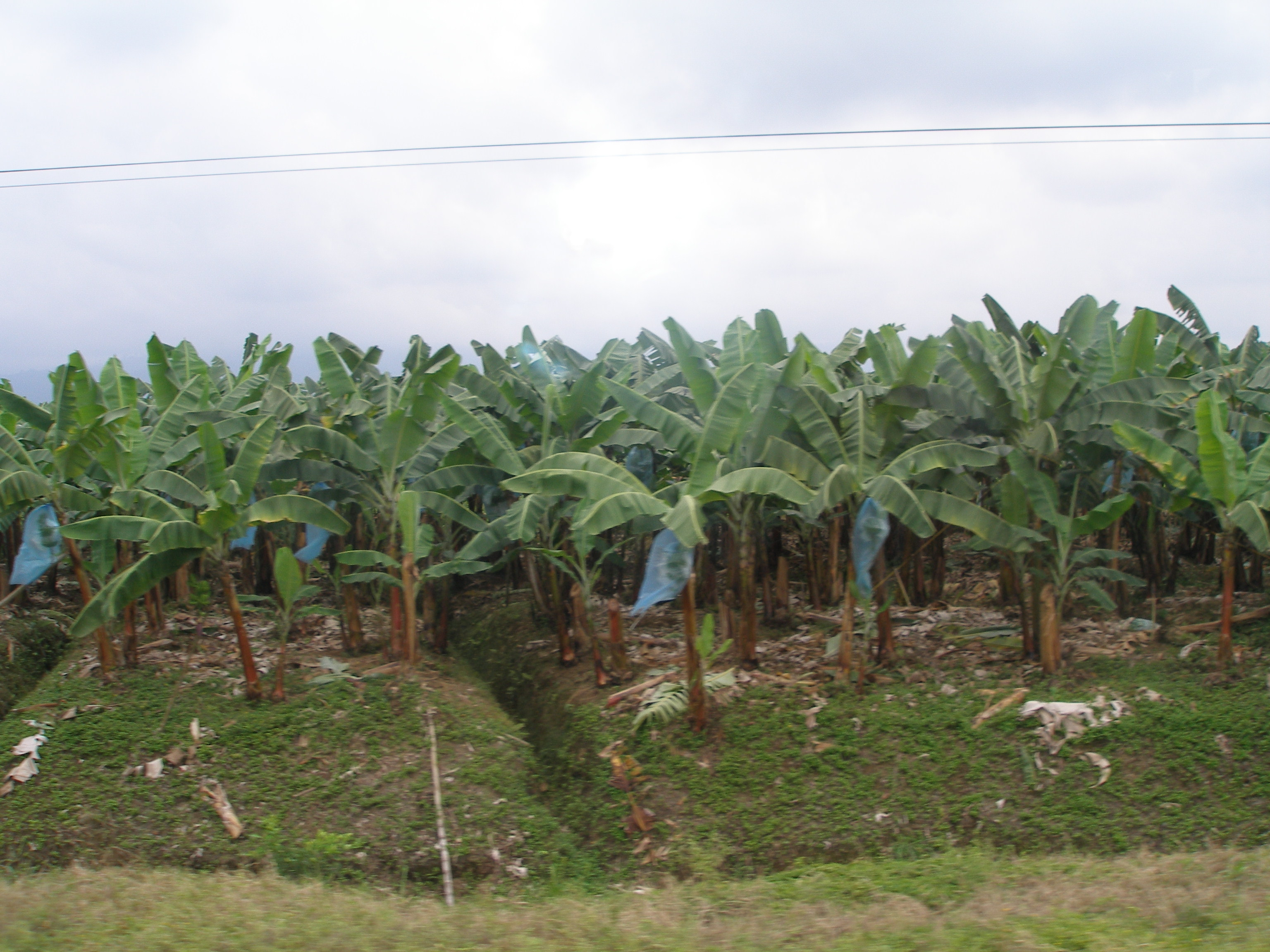
Banana plantation in Ecuador, photographed in 2006.

Banana production in Ecuador is an important component to the national economy. This country has been a lead banana producer since 1953. The country approximately exports more than 4 million tons of bananas annually. In 2016-2018 Ecuador contributed 36% of the worlds exported bananas. Ecuador is a good place to cultivate bananas due to its warm and wet climate, and abundance of rivers. The country is inexperience at hurricanes or high wind storms which reduces the likelihood of banana crops being destroyed. The provinces of Los Rios and Guayas produce the most bananas out of the country, accounting for 70% of the countries total banana production in 2022. The main commercial banana variety is the Cavendish banana, in the past the dominant variety was the Gros Michel banana, but that variety was retired due to Fusarium wilt disease. Historically large multinational companies have influenced banana production in Latin American countries, however Ecuador remained independent from this influence regarding banana production. The crop is mostly grown on private plantations which sell their crops to national and international companies. Dole Food Company, Chiquita Brands, and Del Monte Corporation are foreign owned multinational companies that export Ecuadorian bananas and do not own any plantations in the country. These foreign companies form contract agreements with local Ecuadorian banana producers.

== History ==
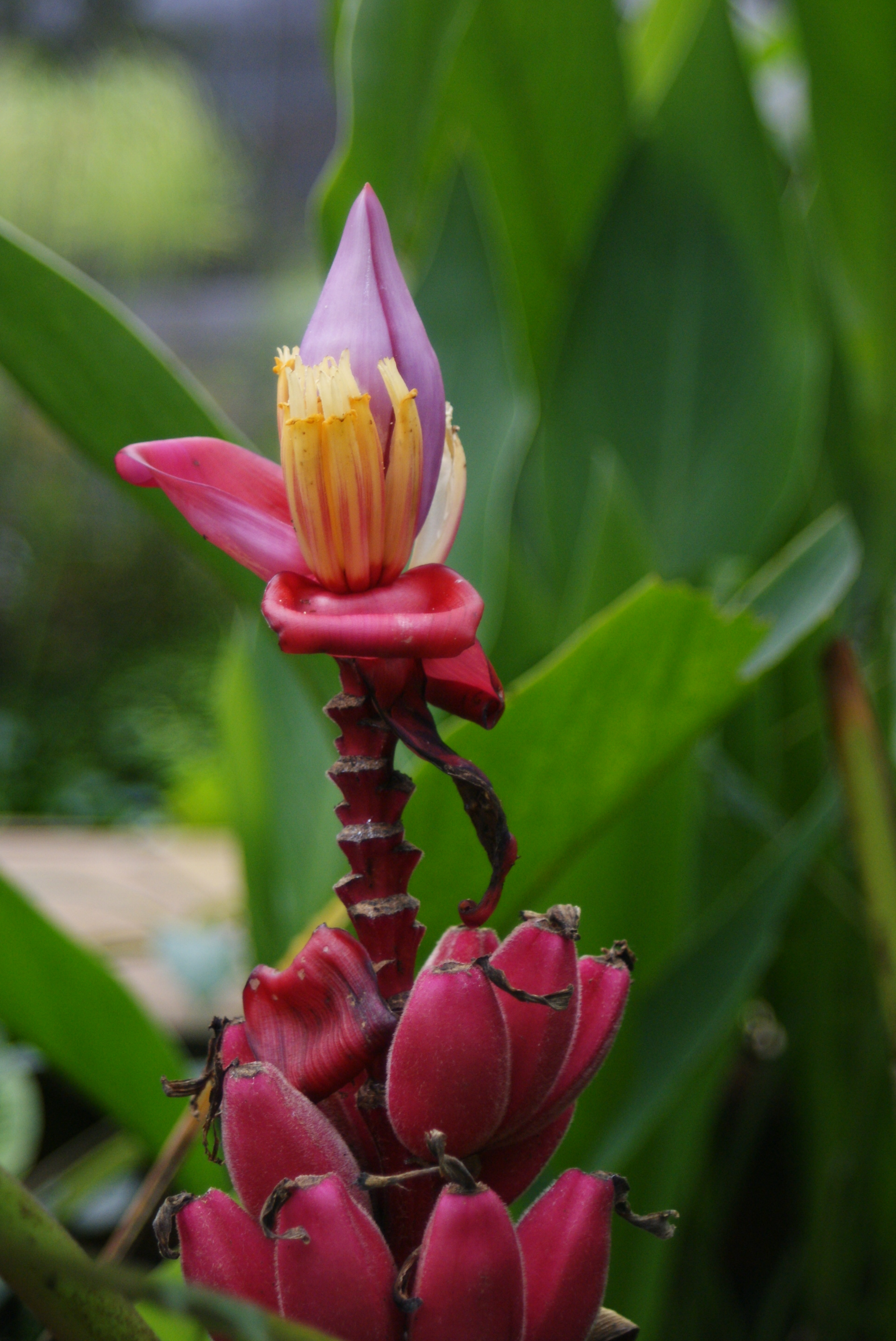
Pink banana (Musa velutina) in a butterfly sanctuary in the cloud forests of Mindo, Ecuador.

Production of bananas began in Ecuador in 1910. However, the industry did not experience a boom until 1948, when the government of President Galo Plaza began issuing agricultural credits, tariffs, building ports and a highway on the coast, and making efforts towards pest control.

At its peak in the mid-1950s, Ecuador was the largest banana producer in the world. A decade later, there were 3,000 banana farms in the country, each averaging approximately 158 acres in size. As of 1960, bananas exported from Ecuador accounted for 25 percent of the world's production, out-producing all of the Central American countries.

Ecuador remained more independent from multinational companies, like the United Fruit Company and Standard Fruit Company, unlike the countries Central American neighbors. Most banana production was in the hands of medium-scale domestic producers. This resulted in reduced labor issues among banana producers. Ecuador was more intentional about who was allowed to purchase land, who received exporting privileges, and who controlled labor. However, the country went through a cocoa crisis in the 1920s. Cocoa was a primary export at the time, and Ecuador needed to find a new crop to export. Ecuadorian Congress passed a law that opened up an opportunity for multinational companies to come in and help produce and export bananas, and promoted this new law by implementing tax exemptions for the first two years of production. A man by the name of Clarence L. Chester arrived advertising that he would help local banana producers with exporting their crops for a cheap price. He had experience with working with Latin American countries, specifically Peru. He promised that the company that he represented had no intention of monopolizing their services, however he did not disclose which company he represented. Due to the growing fears among the Ecuadorian public that their country would be treated how United Fruit treated Central American countries, there was a lot of public push back regarding the potential deal with Chester. This push back resulted in the revelation that Chester was the vice president of Pacific Fruit Company, located in New York. One of the directors of the company was the Ecuadorian Senator Manuel Navarro. This revelation elicited more information about the potential deal with Chester, the contract was much more generous and would have allowed the Pacific Fruit Company to have much more influence on banana production than just export transportation. Due to public and Congressional opposition to the contract deal, the deal fell throughand was abandoned in 1933.

In the late 1950s, a fungal disease called Panama disease caused huge losses to the banana crop. During the 1960s agrarian reform caused fragmentation of land holdings and multinational companies closed down due to labour trouble. Large landholders lost the advantage and as a result very large numbers of smaller non union plantations came to be established under local producers. During this period Central American countries introduced a new variety known as Cavendish bananas, which was a setback to Ecuador as its banana production was affected. However, Dole ensured that Ecuador's export share in the world market did not fall below 15%.

In 1974, Ecuador became a member of the Union of Banana Exporting Countries in an attempt to bargain for better prices. The UEB proposal of an export tax did not succeed in Ecuador, however. In 1975 the UEB collapsed after what became known as "bananagate", bribery of the banana trade monopoly consisting of the three US companies (United Fruit, Standard Fruit, and the Del Monte Corporation).

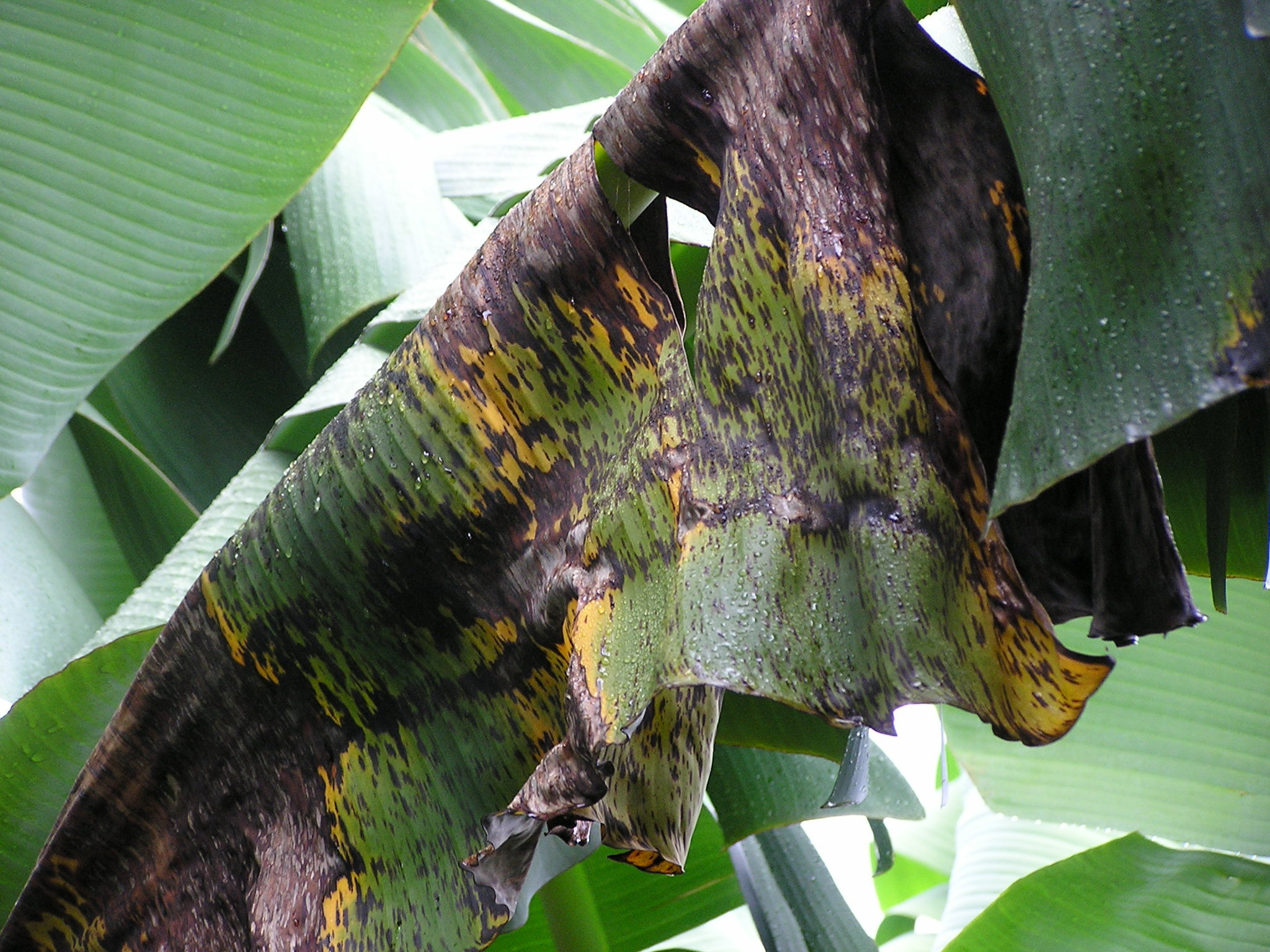
Effects of Black sigatoka on a banana leaf

Eventually, the Black sigatoka, a banana disease destroying much of banana production in Central American countries and Colombia, as well as a levy of export tax, and political unrest in Central America, came to Ecuador's advantage. The Standard Fruit Company and Del Monte Fresh Produce Company decided to make Ecuador the primary supplier of bananas in the 1970s. Some 147,909 hectares were dedicated to production, 99 percent of which were in the three provinces of Oro, Guayas, and Los Ríos in the lowlands of the Pacific coast, with a tropical climate and rich soil conditions.

During the 1980s and 1990s in Ecuador, the economic policy of foreign trade was modified to comply to the international trade regime. This boosted banana exports, accounting for 21.1 per cent of total exports and 64.7 per cent of all agricultural exports during the decade of the 1990s. In 1998, there were 4,941 banana planters employing a workforce of 98,000. In 1999 Dole established a new loading terminal at Bananapuerto in 1999.

In 2003 the Food and Agriculture Organization reported that the country's banana workers received lower wages than banana workers in all other Latin American banana-exporting nations. A study conducted three years earlier stated that the country's banana worker's average monthly wage was US$56.

In 2012, Ecuador reported losses of $600 million due to the Black sigatoka fungus, with 40% (85,000 hectares) of the country's banana plantations affected by it.

== Economics ==
Bananas are produced by more than 130 different countries across the world. Asia and Latin America host the majority of banana production operations. As of 2019, the main banana exporting countries were Ecuador, the Philippines, and Costa Rica. The main importing countries are the USA, the EU, and Russia. Banana production in Latin America is an economic success as the tropical climate is suitable for banana cultivation. Bananas thrive in climates with lots of rainfall and hot temperatures. Within 2016-2018 Ecuador contributed to 36% of the worlds international banana exports, within the same few years Ecuador produced an annual average of nearly 54 million tons of bananas. Ecuador has been a lead banana producer since 1953.

Due to bananas having a cheap retail price and high caloric value, bananas are among the most popular dessert fruit in the entire world. Low prices and high caloric value make bananas a popular and common food source among minority and impoverished communities across the globe. Around 50 million tons of Cavendish bananas are produced each year, and over 20 million are sold globally. The banana trade is worth about $11 billion, and bananas are considered to be among the top ten agriculture crops.

Chiquita Brand's Logo

Banana production in Ecuador is maintained by about 5,200 independent producers. The majority of the exports are controlled by foreign multinational companies, these companies control just under 90% of banana exports. Dole Food Company, Chiquita Brands, Del Monte Corporation, Fyffes and Noboa and dominate the global banana trade. Chiquita and Dole are owned by the USA and each company controls 25% of global banana trade. Del Monte is owned by the USA and controls 8% of the banana trade. Fyffes is Irish owned and controls 8% of the banana trade. Noboa is owned by Ecuador and controls 8% of the banana trade.

Foreign owned multinational companies are not involved in the production of bananas in Ecuador and do not own any plantations. Noboa and Favorita, both Ecuadorian owned companies, own about 7,000 hectares of land for banana production each. The majority of banana production is controlled and maintained by independent and local producers. 60% of these producers are small holder producers and operate on about 30 hectares of land.

Contracts are formed between the exporting companies and the independent farmers, this is called contract farming. The independent farmers are responsible for covering the costs of production and for the transport of their produce to the ports. The exporting companies are responsible for fleshing out factors such as the logistics and paperwork with the importing ports, packing material, and pricing the produce. Producers have little say in the pricing of their produce which impacts how much capital they receive for their produce. Exporting countries know what the importers want in a product, regarding bananas, texture, flavor, color, and general look is crucial. Due to this, exporting companies tell producers how to make these favorable and aesthetic bananas which can influence production costs.

Despite bananas being a large part of the global agricultural economy, bananas are an economic liability due to the high risk of disease. Threats from fungal diseases like Fusarium wilt, also referred to as Panama disease, and Black sigatoka are significant. Fusarium wilt was discovered around the 1890s on the island of Boca del Toro in Panama, hence the nickname "Panama disease." Black sigatoka was discovered in the 1930s, and is even more destructive than Fusarium wilt as it spreads faster. These fungal diseases originate in the soil and effect the root systems of banana plants, they block the xylem vessels and kill the plant. Not much is understood about how these diseases spread and what needs to be done to prevent these diseases from occurring. The first disease epidemic that swept through Latin America destroyed around 15,000-20,000 acres of banana plantations, and there was an estimated loss of $400 million USD. If left untreated, these diseases can wipe out entire plantations in just a few years. The initial epidemics resulted in mass unemployment and the loss of expensive infrastructure such as irrigation, packing, and pesticide application systems. Lots of plantations faced bankruptcy.

The practice of monoculture can make the effects of these banana disease much worse. When there is minimal genetic variety among plants grown on large-scale plantations, when a disease is introduced all the plants have the potential to be destroyed, resulting in huge economic losses. Despite this risk, monoculture practices are economically desirable as it makes plantations easier to manage. One variety of plant has all the same needs in terms of production, harvest, processing, and transportation. In the past, the Gros Michel variety dominated the banana market between the 1890s-1960s, but due to monoculture practices and the introduction of fungal root disease a stronger genetic variety, the Cavendish banana, replaced it. By 1965 the Gros Michel was replaced officially by the Cavendish variety.

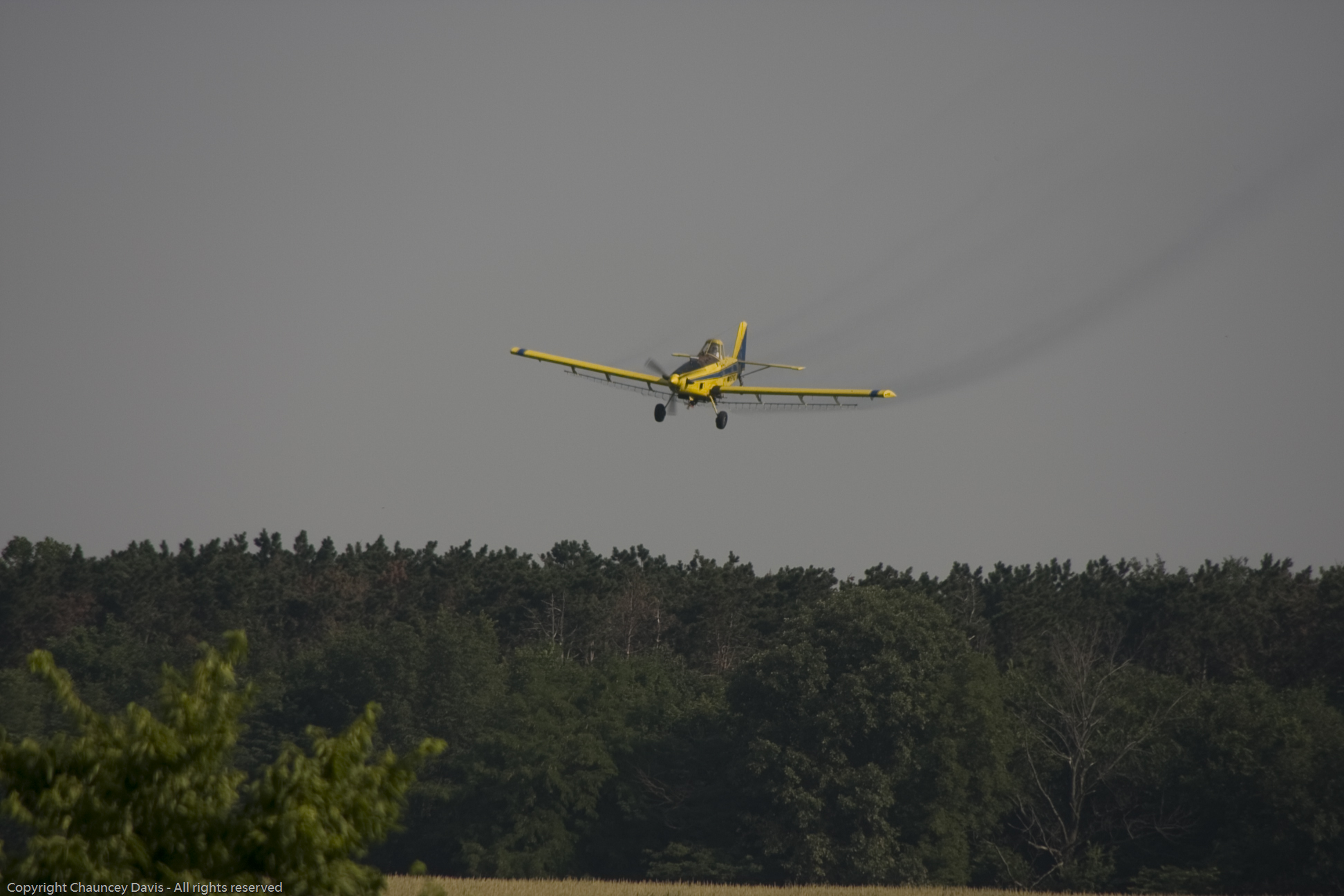
Airplane spraying chemicals

Because the threat of fungal disease is so significant, banana producers rely heavily on the use of agrochemicals, such as pesticides, fungicides, and herbicides. There is no current way to significantly curb the threat of fungal disease so producers invest a lot of money on chemicals to prevent the introduction of disease. The use of agrochemicals increases the cost of banana production by 25%. There are multiple ways to apply agrochemicals but aerial spraying is the most cost effective. This method of application is most cost effective as less chemicals are needed to cover a larger area, these chemicals are applied as a gas, smoke, or dust. Aerial spraying increases production yield at a lower cost but because this method is less precise than other methods it is the most harmful towards the environment and the health of plantation workers.

Since the 1960s climate change has had varying effects on Ecuadorian banana production. Because bananas thrive best in tropical climates, climate change has the potential to disrupt these conditions. Warming temperatures may not disrupt production as much, however changes in rainfall patterns could result in plantations needing to invest in more irrigation systems. Climate change is also likely to change the frequency, intensity, and location of hurricanes which can greatly harm banana production. Ecuador does not experience hurricanes or violent wind storms, therefore if climate change does intensify these storms Ecuador production should be spared. Warmer climates also can increase the potential for the introduction of new diseases.

== Production ==
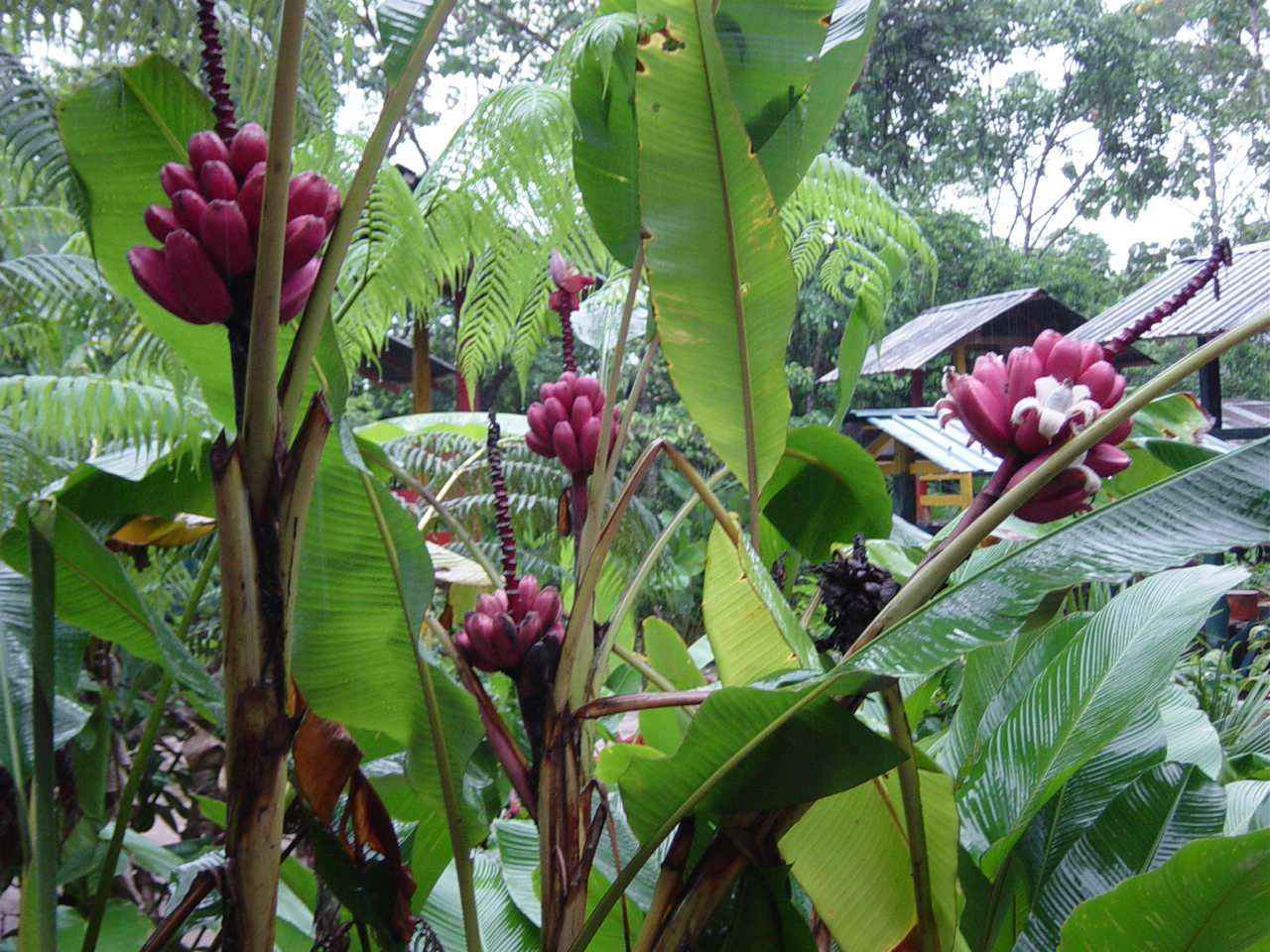
Blossoming banana plant

Production of banana involves direct adoption of natural resources and labour force. Its dependence, as an agricultural industry, to variation in international prices is high. World consumption standards, trade and environmental regulations, sanctions applied by Ecuador's principal buyers, and the opinions of civil society also have a major bearing on its production. Its commercial production is also influenced by the trade policy of the European Union.

As of 2000, Ecuador's export of bananas (the second dominant export item after crude oil) was 3,993,968 metric tons which accounted for 28% of the world's production of 14,155,222 metric tons, making up 5 percent of its GDP. Of this export, bananas were primarily destined for the United States, the largest importer (24 percent), followed by the European Union accounting for 17 percent. However, the European Union, is insistent on signing a trade deal which Ecuador has so far refused to sign. This has created fear among the farming community in Ecuador for their livelihoods.

Although there are 300 varieties of bananas grown in Ecuador, the widely grown variety is Cavendish, which can be grown at high densities but are susceptible to pest, mould and other diseases, and spraying the plant with chemicals and pesticides is an essential requirement to maintain yield levels. The Gros Micheals banana variety was the popular market option between 1890-1960, until the Panama disease rendered them "extinct" within the market. Cavendish bananas are now the most popular commercial variety.

Bananas are harvested almost every week of the year. The plant growth begins after a plant is cut and a new one sprouts from the root of parent plant. It becomes fruit bearing one year later. Harvested bananas are transported to destinations by truck every week.

The cultivation process involves removal of weeds, applying insecticides, covering the fruits with plastics to prevent loss due to close contact, also enclosing the bananas with plastic bags filled with insecticide, protecting plant stocks by covering them with strips of plastic coated with insecticide, removal of yellow and dead leaves, and providing support by propping up the plants with wooden stakes. The growth phases are monitored by tying coloured bands to the stalks. Thus, there are three stages of monitoring which are: harvesting fruit-laden stalks, transporting them to the packing plant, cutting the remaining stems after harvest.

Bananas grow best in tropical environments with warm temperatures and ample rainfall. Bananas like temperatures at about 26 to 30 degrees Celsius, and rainfall around 25 to 50mm of water a week. This makes Ecuador a good place to grow this fruit as the country's climate is warm and rainy. Bananas need adequate soil drainage in order to prevent fungal growth in their root systems, bananas like moist soil so drainage is crucial. Soils should be around 60mm deep, loamy, and have a high humus content to ensure good drainage. To get the most efficient banana growth, soils must be drained within at least 24 hours, this water is then drained into nearby water systems. Soils fertile in nitrogen, calcium and phosphorus will aid the bananas in growing healthy and strong.

In Ecuador banana plantations are usually located near waterways and rivers, making root drainage easy. Ecuadorian lowlands are the best for banana production as there is fertile soil and an abundance of river systems and rainfall providing adequate irrigation water. The provinces of Guayas and Los Rios produce the most bananas, these provinces have fertile soil, adequate rainfall and warm temperatures. In 2022, these provinces produced 70% of Ecuador's overall banana production. Ecuador does not experience hurricanes or strong winds, which is a common threat to other banana producing countries, making Ecuador a prime location for banana production. Strong winds and hurricanes are a threat to banana production as they can be quite damaging to banana plants. El nino years can possible be an issue to production.

There is a lot of land preparation required before planting bananas. Banana farms are established on land that has been freshly deforested. Once the land is deforested, lots of chemicals are applied to the soil, such as herbicides and fungicides. Irrigation systems and other infrastructure are required to support mass banana growth. Conventional banana plantations require an abundance of infrastructure as pesticides must be regularly applied, irrigation systems must be reliable, and the harvest must be packaged and transported efficiently.

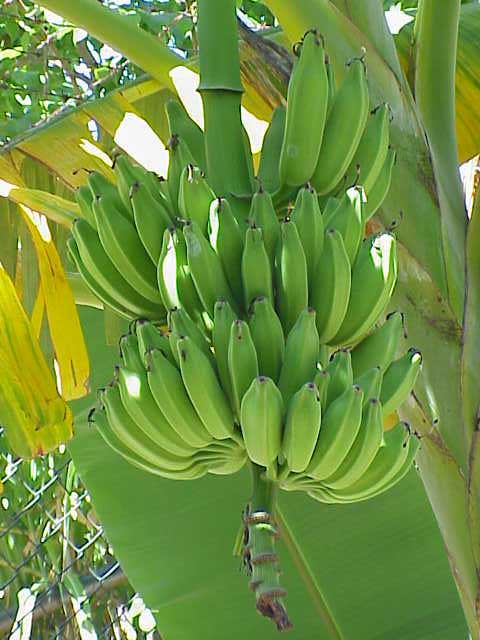
Mature bananas not yet harvested

There are different types of banana agricultural operations: commercial scale (large- or medium-scale), small holder, and subsistence operations. Commercial operations are large-scale and require a lot of equipment, they are usually operated by a national company, and the primary goal is to cultivate bananas for export. Monoculture practices are used to achieve a high yield. A high volume of agrochemicals is regularly applied as bananas are highly susceptible to fungal infestations and disease, especially on monoculture plantations. Commercial operations use heavy equipment and machinery to support production these include, irrigation systems, pesticide application systems, packhouses, and transport systems. Smallholder and subsistence banana farming is a lot more small scale than conventional farming. These operations produce only small amounts of capital and are operated by family or local community labor. Only simple equipment is used, these include shovels, machetes, and simple pesticide application.

Bananas are harvested when they are fully mature, this is when they are a dark green color. Once harvested they are hung up in a cool dark place to ripen and mature more, this is where the bananas gain their desired color, flavor and texture. There are four ripening stages, first there is the pre-climacteric stage which is when the banana is freshly picked and is firm and dark green. The second stage is the climacteric stage, this is when the banana is a lighter green color. The third stage is the ripe stage when the banana is a yellow green color and is less firm but not mushy. And the last stage is the senescence stage when the banana is the classic yellow color. Once the desired flavor, color, and texture is achieved the bananas are shipped off for export.

== Cuisine ==
The country's cuisine includes a variety of different banana types such as oritos (sweet baby bananas): yellow eating bananas which are short, fat and very sweet. A related fruit, plantains or plátanos (pronounced "PLAH-ta-nohs"), are also grown extensively in Ecuador, and are usually cooked for eating, both when green and at various stages of ripening. In the coastal areas, a popular side dish served is Patacones, or fried plantains. Plantains are eaten in deep fried form or baked or boiled and used in a wide variety of dishes. The green variety is unripe and is known as verde, the Spanish word for green. When they are ripe they turn yellow and then black. Green plantains are commonly cut into thin slices and deep fried. These are known as chifles and are very popular, much like potato chips, used to accompany ceviches and many other dishes; the maqueño type is especially good for chifles. Viche is a soup containing banana, calamari, conch, crab, crawfish, fish, and peanuts.

== Environmental and humanitarian concerns ==
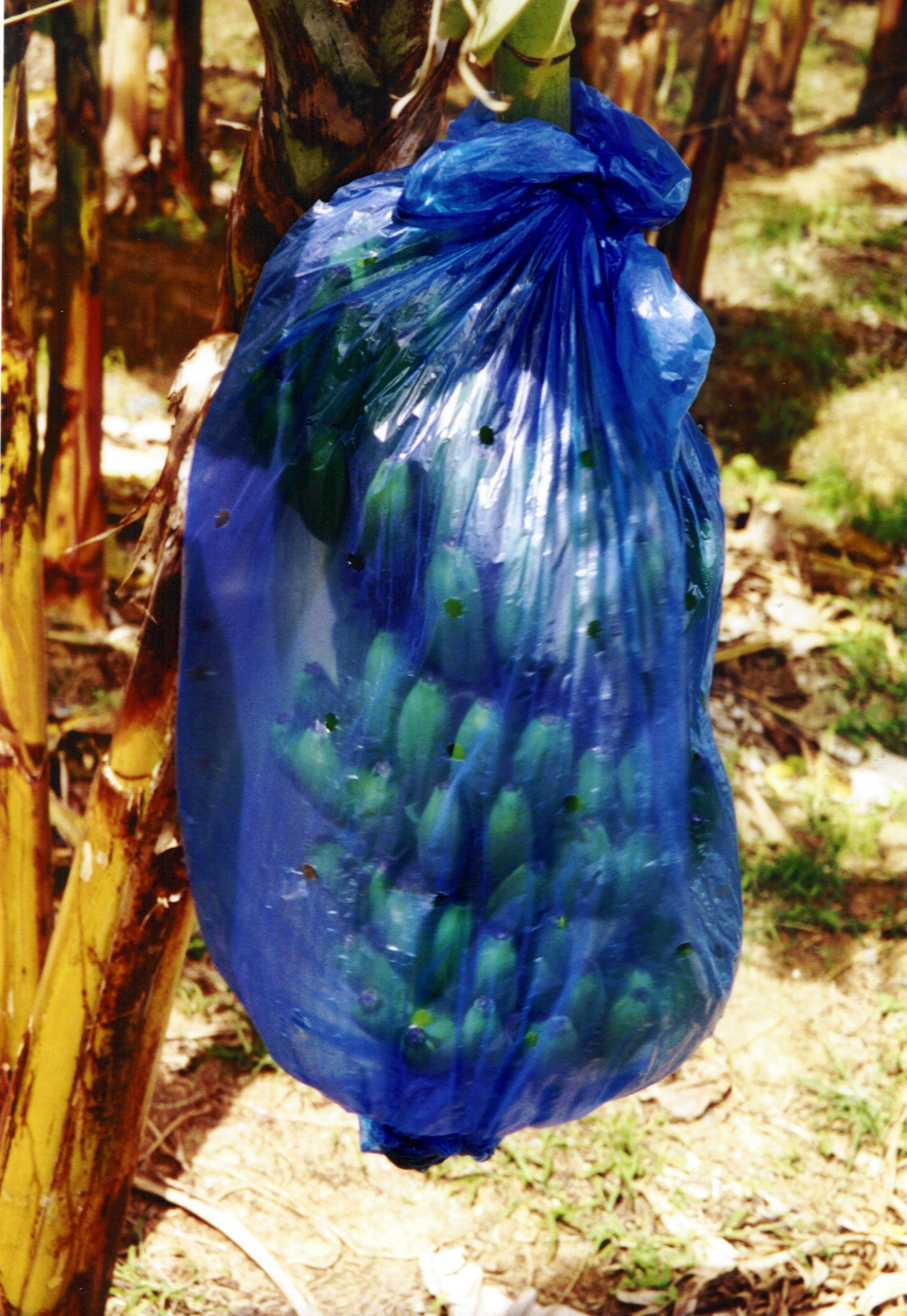
Bananas wrapped in a blue plastic bag on a plantation on the island of St. Lucia.

=== Plastic waste ===
One issue is of waste management, particularly of plastic bags that are tied to the plants and the fruits during the stages of its growth. Of these bags, the blue colour bags are reported to have toxic effect of Chlorpyrifos, which are not controlled and found discarded near plantations. A study on Cavendish banana plantations in Costa Rica found that in 1993 the industry generated 3,055,830 tons of waste. This total includes plastics, cardboard, chemicals, and biological waste. For comparison, also in 1993, Costa Rica exported only 952,776 tons of bananas. The process for growing Cavendish bananas industrially is the same worldwide.

=== Chemical waste and impacts on human health ===
Aerial spraying of insecticides takes place with about 25 such cycles of spraying in a year. This is a major issue as the people both in the banana production process and in the spraying process are exposed to the toxic effects of the chemicals. Not only the plantation but also houses, animals and water bodies are affected by the spray. Testing of water samples from affected areas has revealed the presence of calixin and organophosphates. These toxics can lead to toxicant-induced loss of tolerance (TILT). Researchers have documented that exposure to these toxins can result in respiratory, neurological, and dermatological issues. While aerial spraying is one aspect of the problem, manual spraying has much greater impact in the field as the task is sublet to contractors whose employees performing the task are not employed by the plantation. They use highly toxic products such as Mocap (Ethoprophos), and they usually work without any protective cover. On farms where workers were frequently exposed to agricultural chemicals, anomalies in buccal epithelial cells were between 24% and 80% more frequent than was found in the cells of Ecuadorian farmers on ecological farms that avoid chemical pesticides. The rate of these anomalies is significant as it represents a increased cancer risk in plantation workers. A 1996 study in Costa Rica found a 10% increase in the likelihood of sterility, cancer, and organ damage among people associated with the banana industry. Additionally, the threat these chemicals pose to the local environment is a serious concern. Large scale freshwater contamination due to the proliferation of pesticides is a threat. Soil exposed to these chemicals can also become toxic and unusable to local plant and animal species.

=== Social impacts ===
An assessment of the sustainability of the banana industry in Ecuador was carried out in 2020 by University of California, Davis. This assessment looked at both the environmental and the social impacts of the large scale banana agriculture in Ecuador. The study found that in regions where bananas are primarily produced, the average lifespan and child nutrition levels are higher than other regions, suggesting that the success of the banana industry is having some positive social impacts. Despite the success of the banana industry in Ecuador, the assessment found that there has been only a negligible change (between a -2% and a 3% decrease) in rural poverty in banana producing provinces between 2001 and 2010, suggesting that the wealth created by the exportation of bananas is not making it to the hands of rural agricultural laborers. Additionally, banana monocultures like those present in Ecuador have a high risk of propagating disease and blight, similar to the spread of the Panama Disease and subsequent death of the Gros Michel strain of Banana in the 1950's.

=== Attempted solutions ===
A framework known as the Corporate Social Responsibility (CSR) programme has been introduced to address the above issues but its effectiveness has been seriously questioned. Hence, an alternative suggestion made by FAO to address the issues of environmental effects is to evolve a "Health, Safety & Environment Programme" for the whole banana industry, based on trade union proposals, building common priorities and strategies with other stakeholders and implementing concerted strategies to make progressive changes to improve the seriously deteriorated situation facing workers.

=== Child labor ===
Exposure to toxic pesticides is a threat to all workers including children as young as 8 years of age. According to the Human Rights Watch, Ecuador has 'violated its duty to respect, protect, and promote workers' rights to organize, as required by the International Covenant on Civil and Political Rights, the ILO Convention concerning Freedom of Association and Protection of the Right to Organise, and the ILO Convention concerning the Right to Organise and Collective Bargaining. In 2013, the U.S. Department of Labor reported that 2.7% of children aged 5 to 14 are working children and that 71% of them continue to be engaged in child labor in the agricultural sector, namely in the production of bananas. In December 2014 and as far as Ecuador is concerned, bananas are mentioned in the List of Goods Produced by Child Labor or Forced Labor.
