= Chevis =

Chevis is a personal name, and is both a given name or a surname.

Notable people with the name Chevis include:

== Given name ==
- Chevis Jackson (born 1985), American football player and coach

== Surname ==
- Hubert Chevis (1902–1931), British lieutenant and victim of an unsolved murder
