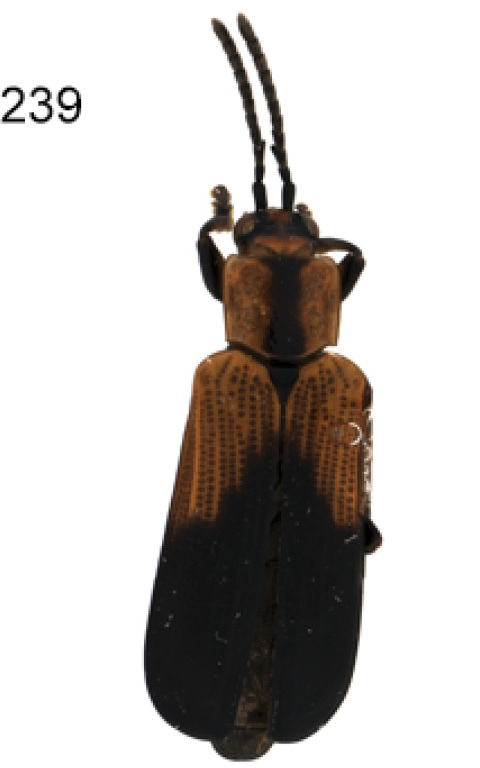

Scientific classification
- Kingdom: Animalia
- Phylum: Arthropoda
- Class: Insecta
- Order: Coleoptera
- Suborder: Polyphaga
- Infraorder: Cucujiformia
- Family: Chrysomelidae
- Genus: Cephaloleia
- Species: C. stenosoma

Binomial name
- Cephaloleia stenosoma Baly, 1885

Synonyms
- Cephalolia stenosoma biolleyi Pic, 1926

= Cephaloleia stenosoma =

Species of beetle

Cephaloleia stenosoma is a species of beetle of the family Chrysomelidae. It is found in Costa Rica, Guatemala and Panama.

== Description ==
Adults reach a length of about 6.8–7.8 mm. The head, antennae and scutellum are black, while the pronotum is reddish-yellow, often with variable black markings. The elytron varies from entirely reddish-yellow, to variable black markings, to entirely black.

== Biology ==
Adults have been collected from Heliconia imbricata, Heliconia latispatha, Heliconia trichocarpa, Heliconia wilsonii, Calathea crotalifera and Musa velutina.
