= Strategic steam reserve =

Withdrawn locomotives kept for a national emergency

A strategic steam reserve (SSR) is a collection of withdrawn steam locomotives which is kept in working order for possible use in a national emergency. During the Cold War several countries, including Sweden, Finland and the Soviet Union, kept SSRs and the United Kingdom is reported to have done so, albeit without evidence.

== Need for a SSR ==
Many European railways have a large mileage which is electrified. In the event of a war, or major natural disaster, electricity supplies could be disrupted and electric locomotives would be unworkable. Diesel locomotives could also be at risk for two reasons:

- Supplies of imported oil might be cut off,
- solid state components in diesel locomotives might be destroyed by the electromagnetic pulse (EMP) from a nuclear weapon. In practice, locomotives of this period contained no such sensitive components.

== Feasibility ==
Although the availability and even storage of large numbers of steam locomotives would be practical (at least, on the scale of other Cold War strategic projects), the overall usefulness of such a reserve is far less practical.

- Steam locomotives require an infrastructure for their coaling, maintenance and especially water supply. This infrastructure was mostly dismantled with the withdrawal of the locomotives.
- Trained footplate crews might be drawn from the ranks of those previously experienced with steam, although their numbers will inevitably reduce over time. There would also be a need for ongoing refresher training.
- Certification of boilers involves a boiler certificate, issued for a fixed period of usually ten years. Even in storage, such boilers degrade by corrosion and would require a policy of careful storage, inspection and at least some maintenance.

== The British 'Strategic Reserve' ==
The alleged British 'Strategic Reserve' is a potent and frequently recurring urban myth amongst railway enthusiasts. Following the complete withdrawal of mainline steam traction in 1968, the myth persisted for decades that a reserve of locomotives had been retained for such a strategic purpose. As no official reserve existed, nor was any reserve obviously visible, this encouraged many fanciful explanations for where the reserve might be hidden, usually in some tunnel or mine. One theory even claimed that the growing steam preservation movement was itself the Strategic Reserve.

Some support for these theories was given by the young age and high quality of the British locomotive fleet. The British Railways Standard classes were the pinnacle of British locomotive design and had been constructed until only a few years before withdrawal, even after the withdrawal of steam had been planned. Rather than applying Hanlon's razor to this evident wastefulness, the assumption was that there must have been some other secret justification to constructing a fleet of new, capable and standardised locomotives.

Another theory was that the reserve comprised the NCB's continued operational fleet of Austerity saddle tank locomotives. The Austerities were solidly constructed, reliable and easy to maintain; despite slow speed and short range, they were also powerful in terms of tractive effort. They were the last standard gauge steam locomotives to be constructed in the UK in the 20th century, and were in good condition, especially regarding their projected boiler life remaining. As they had also been operated by the Army themselves, this was taken as further "evidence" to support the theory, amongst the fringes of rail enthusiasts.

In fact all scrapped steam locomotives have been accounted for, and the alleged hiding places, for example Box Tunnel, proved to be innocuous. In 2008, BBC Radio 4's programme Punt PI, with Steve Punt, investigated the alleged Strategic Reserve, but found no evidence for its existence.

== In popular culture ==
The theorized British SSR is mentioned in Charles Stross' series of novels The Laundry Files. It is also a key plot point in Rian Hughes' novel The Black Locomotive, where the titular engine is a SR Lord Nelson Class locomotive, the Lord Hawke.
