= William Cantelo =

19th-century British inventor

- Born: 1830; Newport, Isle of Wight
- Disappeared: 1880s
- Status: long deceased
- Relatives: 3 children

William Cantelo (born 1830) was a 19th-century British inventor. Credited with developing an early machine gun, he disappeared from his home in Southampton in the 1880s. While trying to find Cantelo, his two sons saw a photograph of American-born inventor Hiram Maxim (born 1840), creator of the Maxim gun; his superficial similarity to their father led them to believe that he had re-emerged under a new name.

== Background ==
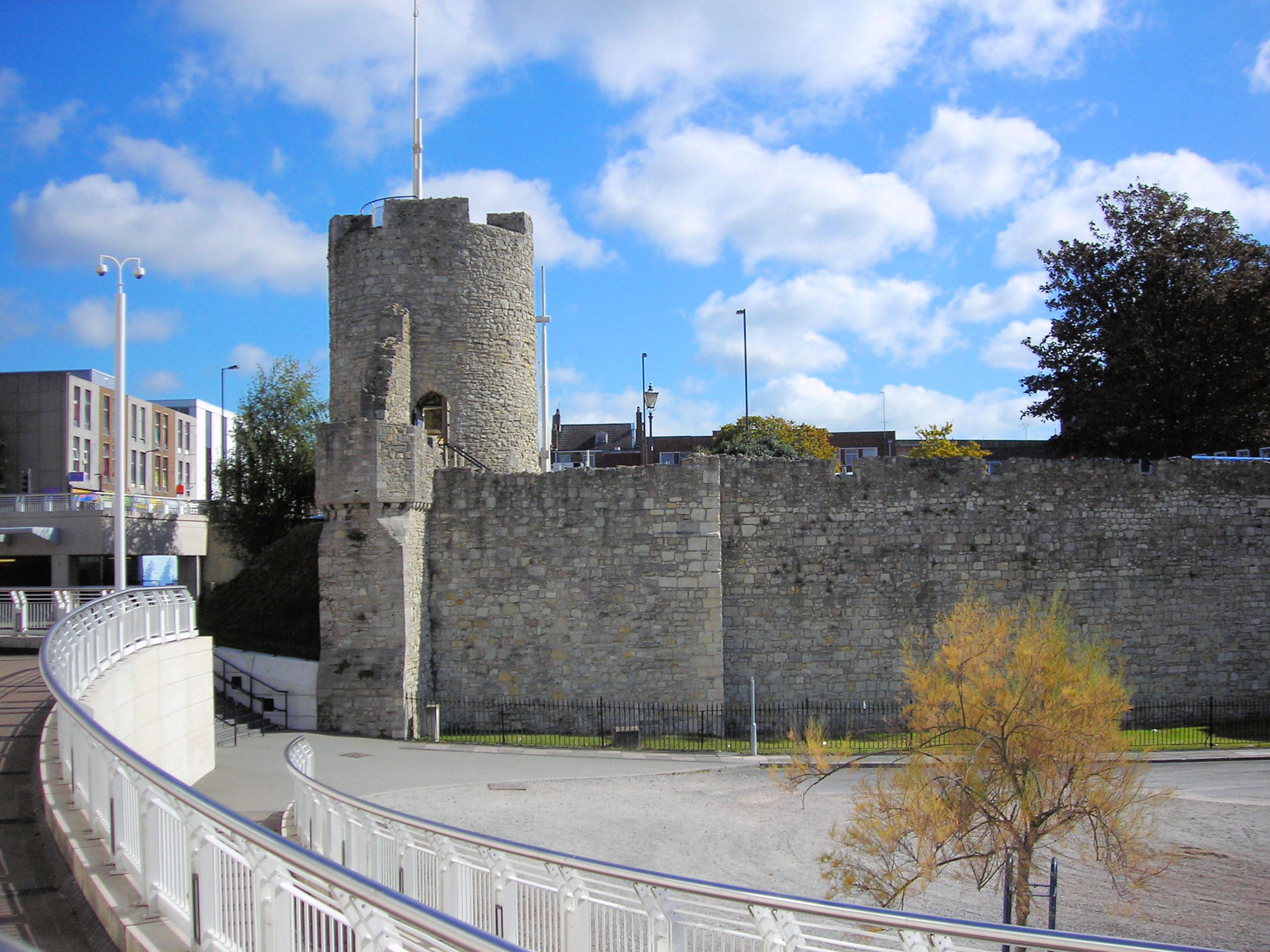
Arundel Tower in Southampton, against which used to be Cantelo's home, Old Tower Inn

Cantelo was born in 1830 at Newport on the Isle of Wight to parents Elizabeth and William Cantelo. His father was a publican and brush maker. His brother, John, and one of his sisters, Ellen, were artists.

Cantelo became an engineer and, in the 1870s, owned a shop on French Street in Southampton and a yard in Northam, employing up to 40 people. He was also the landlord of the Old Tower Inn at the end of Bargate Street which derived its name from the Arundel Tower against which it was built. Beneath the pub was a tunnel where Cantelo spent much of his time, turning it into an underground workshop.

Cantelo was married with three children – a daughter and two sons. He was a keen musician and the bandmaster of the old 2nd Hampshires.

== Invention ==
The development of new, rapid-firing guns was becoming a hotly contested area for inventors. The military of countries across the world were looking to secure the most powerful weapons, and there was great potential for an inventor to secure a highly profitable government contract. Machine guns were first used during the American Civil War, and the Gatling gun, Nordenfelt gun, and Gardner gun had all started gaining popularity. Cantelo wanted his own stake in the revolution.

Cantelo used the tunnel underneath the Old Tower Inn for his experiments and was later joined by his two sons, both engineers themselves. Locals reported hearing noises coming from the vicinity, but the family kept their work a closely guarded secret. In the early 1880s Cantelo announced the gun's completion to his family.

== Disappearance ==
Accounts differ regarding the nature of Cantelo's disappearance. Some reports say that he went for an extended holiday as a reward for his hard work or might have gone off to sell his finished invention. It is also claimed that a large sum of Cantelo's money had been transferred out of his bank account after his disappearance.

Cantelo's family tried to find William, but with no real success. They employed a private investigator, who traced him to America but could not find out anything more.

== Subsequent rumours and speculations ==
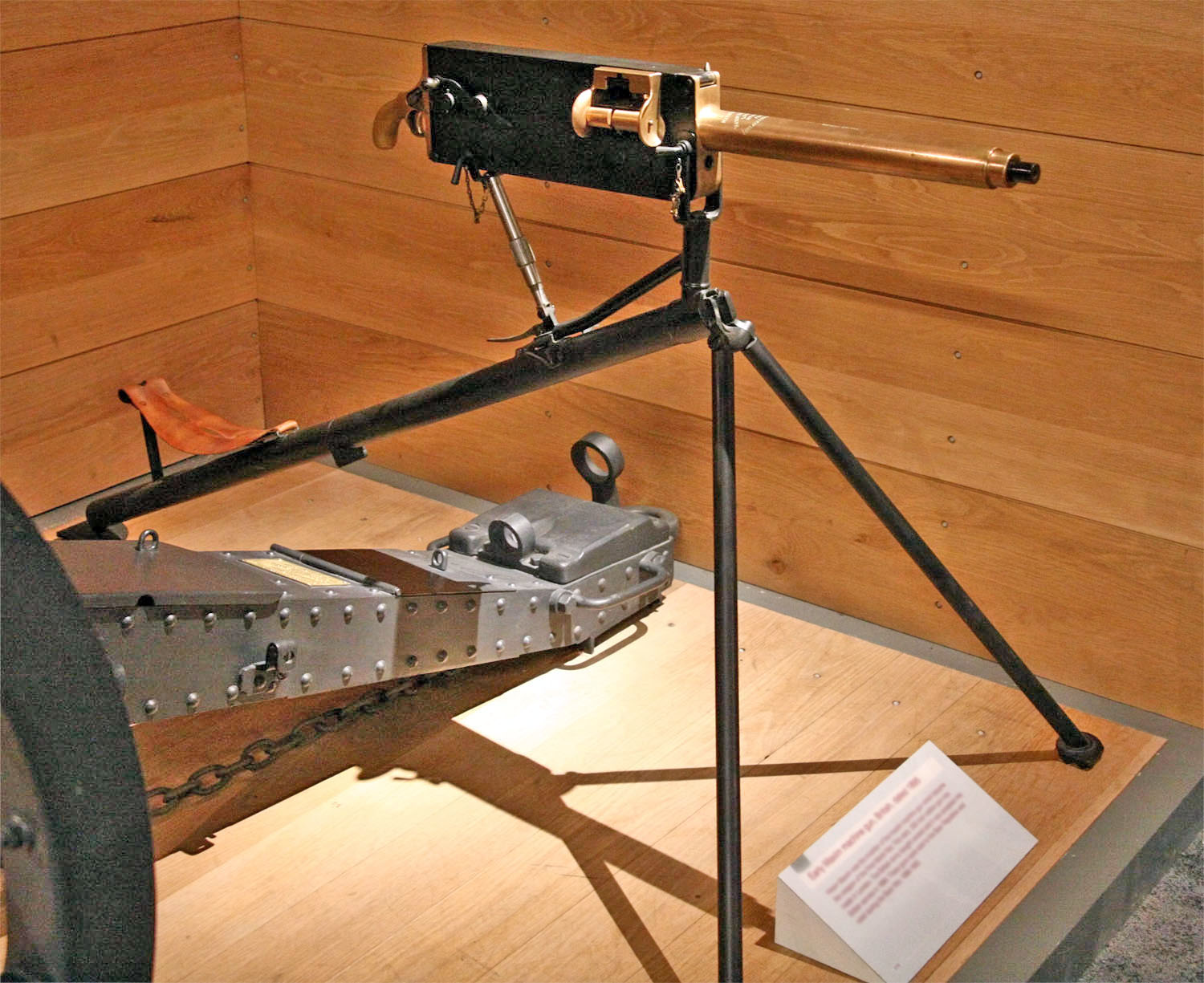
An 1895 Maxim gun. Photo: Max Smith

An American inventor, Hiram Maxim, had moved to London from the United States in 1881 and perfected a rapid-fire machine gun. Cantelo's two sons happened across a photograph of Maxim, whose similarity to their father led them to believe that he was still alive and had assumed a new identity. Descriptions of the gun sounded similar to the one they had worked on. The sons tried to challenge Maxim, but he wanted nothing to do with them. He sold the Maxim gun to the British government.

The name "Maxim", the family claimed, was evidence that Cantelo had assumed this new identity. Fond of maxims, Cantelo often carried a book of such phrases in his pocket. Two witnesses also claim that Cantelo referred to his invention as "my maxim gun". The family's belief that Cantelo re-emerged under a new identity is inconsistent with accounts of Maxim's early life. Born in 1840, Maxim became a carriage maker's apprentice at the age of 14. He developed an interest in inventions and obtained 271 patents, the first of which came in 1866.

An episode of Punt PI, a BBC Radio 4 series, covered the Cantelo story with Steve Punt investigating Cantelo's disappearance. He discovered that Maxim had complained about a man who was impersonating him in the United States. He also showed a photograph of Cantelo next to his machine gun to the Royal Armouries, who stated that the weapon appeared to be the same as the Maxim gun. A facial expert who compared the images of Cantelo and Maxim highlighted that there were visible differences between the two men. Punt cast doubt on the idea that Cantelo and Maxim were the same person but noted the coincidences.

== See also ==
- List of people who disappeared mysteriously (pre-1910)
