= Punt PI =

- Genre: Factual, comedy
- Running time: 30 minutes
- Country of origin: United Kingdom
- Language: English
- Home station: BBC Radio 4
- Hosted by: Steve Punt
- Produced by: Laurence Grissell; Sarah Bowen; Neil George
- Original release: 3 May 2008 – 23 September 2017
- No. of series: 10
- No. of episodes: 35
- Website: BBC website

Punt PI is a fact-based comedy radio series on BBC Radio 4 in which Steve Punt investigates mysteries in Britain.

== Format ==
Each episode is 30 minutes long and there are three or four episodes in each series.

Starting with series two, every episode starts with a ringing phone and then the answering machine of "Punt's Private Eye". A mysterious individual identified only as 'Tracy' then speaks into the answering machine and asks Punt to investigate a mystery he has heard about.

All episodes follow a similar format of Steve Punt introducing the mystery, before heading off to speak to witnesses and experts, and investigating different theories and leads.

== Episodes ==
=== Series 1 (May 2008) ===
1. A couple who found 400 false legs hidden under their floorboards
2. Britain's Strategic steam reserve
3. Numerous aeroplane crashes at Dark Peak in the Peak District

=== Series 2 (June 2009) ===
1. Adolf Hitler's plans for a headquarters in Balham, South West London, possibly at Du Cane Court
2. Television licence detector vans
3. The possibility of a real Manchurian Candidate

=== Series 3 (September and October 2010) ===
1. The phantom settlement of Argleton
2. Nazi UFOs
3. A possible recording of Queen Victoria's voice
4. The curse of The Crying Boy

=== Series 4 (September and December 2011) ===
1. The murder of Hubert Chevis by poisoned partridge
2. A death ray allegedly made by Harry Grindell Matthews
3. A missing film about David Lloyd George
4. The Battle of Watling Street

=== Series 5 (September 2012) ===
1. The arsenal of Kris Ruddjers
2. The Charfield railway disaster
3. The lost Roanoke Colony

=== Series 6 (August 2013) ===
1. The disappearance of William Cantelo
2. The Hollinwell incident
3. The murder of Charles Walton
4. The killing of two bears in the Forest of Dean

=== Series 7 (July and August 2014) ===
1. The Mysterious Death of Flying Millionaire Alfred Loewenstein
2. The 1971 Baker Street Bank Robbery
3. The Case of the MP (Victor Grayson) Who Vanished
4. Who put Bella in the Wych Elm?

=== Series 8 (August 2015) ===
1. The Murder of Hollywood director William Desmond Taylor
2. The Case of the Missing Cezanne
3. The Great Mull Air Mystery looking at mysterious death of hotel guest Peter Gibbs

=== Series 9 (July and August 2016) ===
1. The Suspicious Death of Emile Zola
2. The Reclusive Skeleton of Fingringhoe, exploring the disappearance of actress Constance Kent
3. There's a Kind of Hum

=== Series 10 (September 2017) ===
1. Lost Nukes
2. Treasure in the Piano
3. Missing Priest
4. Taking the Pissoir?
