= Alfred Loewenstein =

Belgian financier (1877–1928)

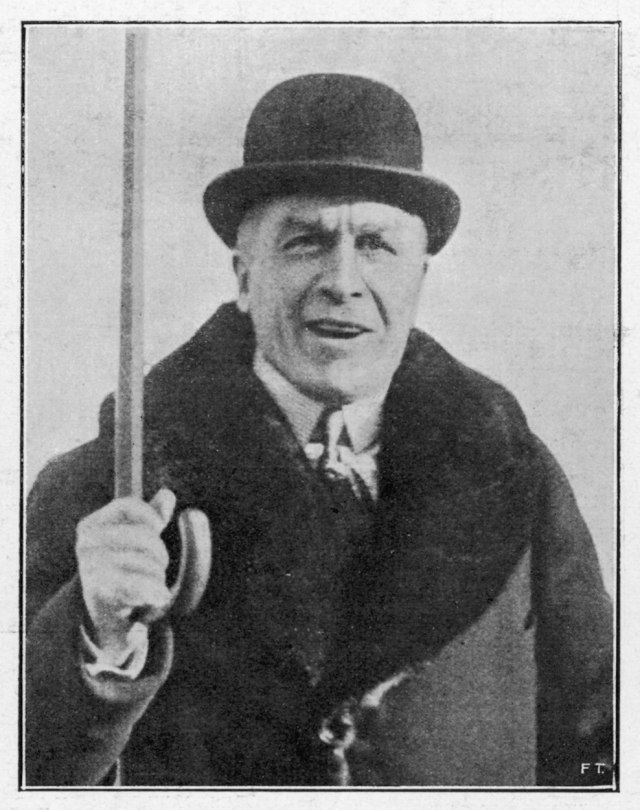
- Born: Alfred Léonard Loewenstein; 11 March 1877; Brussels, Belgium
- Died: 4 July 1928 (aged 51); English Channel
- Resting place: Evere, Belgium
- Occupations: Banker, entrepreneur
- Known for: Death under mysterious circumstances
- Awards: Honorary Companion of the Order of the Bath

Alfred Léonard Loewenstein CB (11 March 1877 – 4 July 1928) was a Belgian financier. At his peak in the 1920s, Loewenstein was worth around £12 million in the currency of the time (equivalent to £651.79 million in 2025), making him the third-richest person in the world at the time. (Note: Loewenstein's wealth was surpassed by John D. Rockefeller and Henry Ford.) His wealth came from investments in electric power and artificial silk businesses when those industries were in their infancy. Loewenstein is remembered today for his mysterious disappearance and death in 1928.

== Early life and business career ==
Alfred Loewenstein was born in Brussels, Belgium, to Bernard Loewenstein, a German-Jewish banker who converted to Catholicism, and the daughter of Brussels stockbroker Chrétien Dansaert, a Catholic. Alfred established his own banking concern, and was a wealthy man by 1914.

During World War I, Loewenstein was commissioned in the Belgian Army; leading to associates and newspapers commonly referring to him as Captain Loewenstein. He offered the Belgian government at Sainte-Adresse US$50 million ($1.61 billion in 2025), interest-free, to stabilize the Belgian currency in return for the right to print Belgian francs—the offer was refused. At war's end, he maintained a residence in England where he ran an investment business that made him one of Europe's most powerful financiers.

Loewenstein partnered with the investment house of Canadian-born Sir James Hamet Dunn in several business ventures; the duo emerging with more than £1,000,000 profit from their 1920s investment in the chemical company British Celanese alone. Loewenstein was also an owner of a successful stable of thoroughbred steeplechase race horses; his horses won the 1926 and 1928 runnings of the Grand Steeple-Chase de Paris.

== Business successes ==
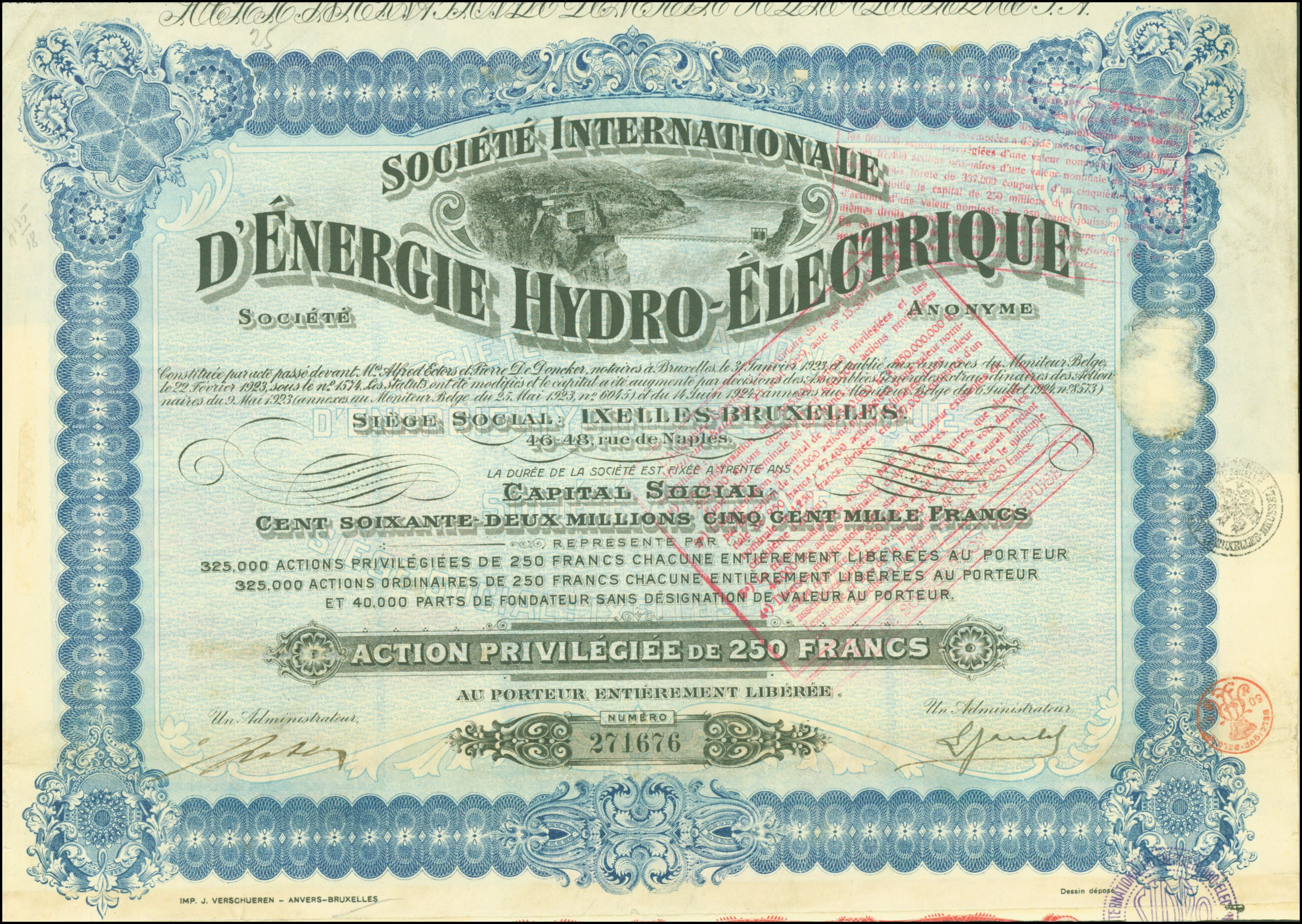
Share of Société Internationale d'Énergie Hydro-Électrique, issued 6 July 1924

Loewenstein made an enormous fortune providing electric power facilities for developing countries worldwide through his Belgian-based company, Société Internationale d'Énergie Hydro-Électrique (SIDRO). By the mid-1920s, Loewenstein's reputation was such that he was consulted by heads of state from around the globe. The British government made Loewenstein a Companion of The Most Honourable Order of the Bath.

In 1926, Loewenstein established "International Holdings and Investments Limited", which raised huge amounts of capital from wealthy investors wishing to get aboard his bandwagon of success.

In 1926, he bought Villa Sacchino, a sumptuous house in Biarritz, in the French Basque Country, with a view on the Bay of Biscay and the Atlantic Ocean.

== Disappearance ==
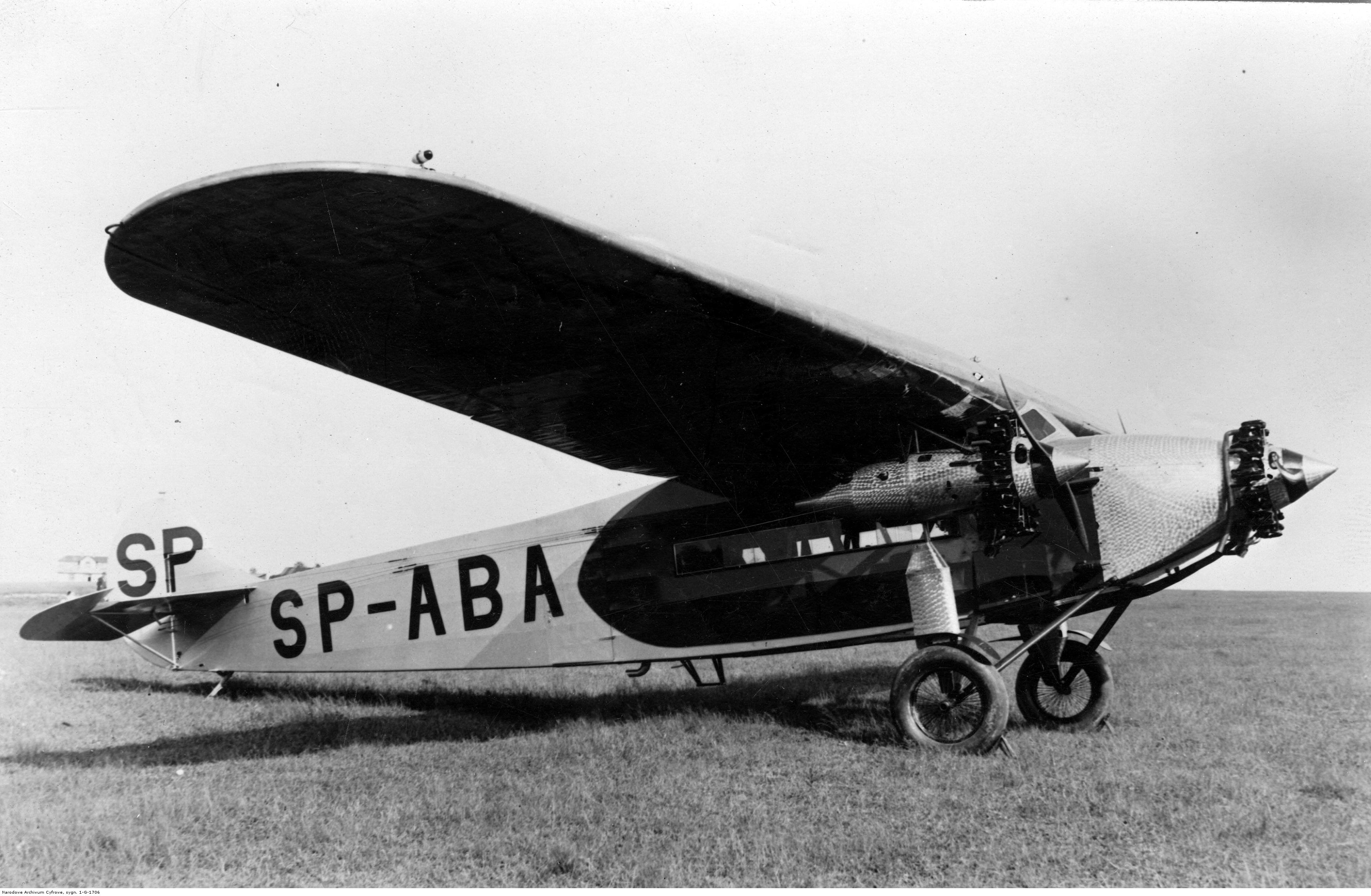
A Fokker F.VII trimotor similar to Loewenstein's aircraft

On the evening of 4 July 1928, Loewenstein left from Croydon Airport to fly to Brussels on his private aircraft, a Fokker F.VIIa/3m trimotor (G-EBYI), along with six other people. According to those on board, while the aircraft was crossing the English Channel at an altitude of 4,000 feet (1,200 m), Loewenstein went to the rear of the aircraft to use the lavatory. In Loewenstein's aircraft, a door at the rear of the main passenger cabin opened on to a short passage with two doors: the one on the right led to the lavatory, while the one on the left was the aircraft's entrance door.

When Loewenstein had not reappeared after some time, his secretary went in search of him and discovered that the lavatory was empty, while the aircraft's entrance door was open and flapping in the slipstream. The employee (along with the others on the aircraft) asserted his belief that Loewenstein had fallen through the aircraft's rear door and plunged several thousand feet to his death in the English Channel. The aircraft landed first on the beach, before transferring to the airfield at Saint-Inglevert, Pas-de-Calais, France.

=== News and investigation ===
News of Loewenstein's demise caused panic selling in his corporations' publicly-traded shares, which immediately plummeted in value by more than 50 percent.

On 12 July 1928, it was reported that tests had been conducted by the Accidents Branch of the British Air Ministry using Loewenstein's aircraft. It was stated that at an altitude of 1,000 feet (300 m) one of the Ministry men had thrown himself against the aircraft's entry door, which had opened about 6 inches (15 cm). However, he was immediately thrown back into the aircraft when the slipstream violently slammed the door shut. It was concluded that it would have been impossible for someone to accidentally open the door and fall out.

Loewenstein's body was discovered near Boulogne on 19 July 1928 and was taken by fishing boat to Calais, where his identity was confirmed by means of his wristwatch; an autopsy was performed (at the request of his family), his brother-in-law stating that they did not suspect anyone of foul play, but that they did not want anyone to suggest after the burial that Loewenstein might have been poisoned or had died in the aircraft and then been thrown out. The autopsy revealed a partial fracture of Loewenstein's skull and several broken bones; it was concluded that he had been alive when he struck the water.

Loewenstein was buried in a cemetery outside Evere, in a tomb belonging to his wife's family, the Misonnes. However, his name was never carved on the slab covering his casket, so he was in effect buried in an unmarked grave.

=== Theories ===
Many theories have been put forward as to exactly what had happened to Loewenstein in the back of his aircraft; some suspected a criminal conspiracy in which his employees murdered him. An Associated Press article in The New York Times reported that Loewenstein's secretary theorized "undoubtedly Captain Loewenstein, leaving the lavatory, had absent-mindedly pushed, in his usual way, the wrong door." The newspaper also referred to Loewenstein as "the victim of a growing habit of absent mindedness." Because he had left behind a tangled web of business ventures, many of which were highly leveraged, others theorized that his business empire was on the verge of collapse. Some even asserted that corrupt business practices were about to be exposed and that Loewenstein, therefore, died by suicide. None of these theories were ever proven.

In 1987, William Norris' book about Loewenstein, The Man Who Fell From the Sky, was published. Norris presents evidence in support of his case that, if Loewenstein's death was not a conspiracy by business rivals and associates, a certain opportunism existed regarding the death of the tycoon and his insurance. He also shows that later events are frequently ignored, including that Loewenstein's son Robert shot one of the family servants under murky circumstances within a decade or so after the tragedy. The son was himself killed in an aviation accident in 1941 while serving with the Air Transport Auxiliary. Norris concluded that Loewenstein had been thrown from the aircraft by the people on board on behalf of his business partners Albert Pam and Frederick Szarvasy. He suggested that the aircraft's rear door was completely removed while in the air, and a replacement later fitted on the beach at St. Pol.

Crime writers Robert and Carol Bridgestock have speculated that Loewenstein faked his own death and disappeared because of the financial irregularities in his businesses. Support for this theory includes that the body was buried in an unmarked grave and that his wife did not attend the funeral.

=== Alleged ties with Arnold Rothstein ===
In his biography of gangster Arnold Rothstein titled Rothstein: The Life, Times, and Murder of the Criminal Genius Who Fixed the 1919 World Series, author David Pietrusza alleged that Loewenstein became partners with Rothstein to fund a major drugs deal in spring 1928, and that his death would have cut off the necessary funding, causing Rothstein to dig deeper into his already stretched resources to prevent the deal collapsing.

== In popular culture ==
Loewenstein's death has been the subject of:

- A 2004 episode of the History Channel's Vanishings! series
- A 2014 episode of BBC Radio 4's Punt PI
- A 2021 episode of Buzzfeed Unsolved: True Crime

== See also ==
- Rudolf Diesel (1858–1913), German inventor who also disappeared in the English Channel
- List of people who disappeared mysteriously at sea
- List of unsolved deaths

== Publications ==
- William Norris: The Man Who Fell From the Sky. New York, Viking, 1987. ISBN 978-0744303032
- Maurice Privat: La vie et la mort d'Alfred Loewenstein. (Note: The Life and Death of Alfred Loewenstein) Paris, La nouvelle société d'édition, 1929
- E. Phillips Oppenheim: Who Travels Alone. The Life and Death of Alfred Loewenstein Project Gutenberg Australia. (e-book, 2012). Accessed 23 Dec. 2015
