= Hollinwell incident =

1980 phenomenon experienced by a massed gathering

The Hollinwell incident refers to an unexplained event in July 1980 when around 300 children suffered fainting attacks, nausea and other symptoms. The incident happened at the Hollinwell Showground in Kirkby-in-Ashfield, in Nottinghamshire, England, and the exact cause has never been determined. The two leading theories relate to mass hysteria and the use of pesticides in nearby fields.

== Background ==
In 1980, the Hollinwell Show, an annual event at the Hollinwell Showground near Kirkby-in-Ashfield, took place on Sunday 13 July. As part of the event the Forest League of Juvenile Jazz Bands decided to hold a charity show, creating a Junior Brass and Marching Band competition, with entrants coming from across the East Midlands. Around 500 children from 11 marching bands were in attendance, many of them brought in by coaches from up to 40 miles (65 kilometres) away. With the show scheduled to begin at 9 am, many of the children were tired from their journeys and nervous about performing.

== The incident ==
At around 10:30, band members began to collapse without any apparent explanation and the fainting seemed to be contagious. Children began "[falling] down like nine pins" according to one witness and soon the numbers of ailing children reached into the hundreds. Symptoms also included vomiting, sore eyes and throats, and dizziness. One girl described her symptoms: "My legs and arms felt as if they had no bones in them and I had a bad headache".

The estimated number of victims was around 300, including children, adults, and babies, and 259 people were taken to four nearby hospitals including the Queen's Medical Centre in Nottingham, with nine children kept in overnight.

A Fortean Times investigation reported that several horses were also taken ill, but admits that any link to the incident is conjecture.

== Cause ==
The exact cause of the widespread illnesses is still disputed. Initial investigations by Ashfield District Council looked into a variety of possible causes, including contaminated water supplies, food poisoning, radio waves, and crop spraying of the nearby fields. The use of pesticides became the favoured explanation, with a 2003 episode of the BBC news and current affairs programme Inside Out revealing the local use of the pesticide tridemorph. Banned by the British government in 2000, tridemorph was discovered to be a harmful substance described by the World Health Organization (WHO) as "moderately hazardous". However, these investigations took place over 20 years after the event and disagree with the official findings. The official inquiry did reveal the use of Calixin, a pesticide that contains tridemorph, but it was not considered to be dangerous at the time.

The official inquiry ruled that mass hysteria was the likely cause, with the symptoms experienced by the children demonstrating some of the characteristics of such an outbreak. People present at the event were adamant that the symptoms were real and not the result of imagination or hysteria. They also expressed their frustration at never having received a satisfactory explanation. In 2003 the council had no plans to revisit the incident or reopen the inquiry.

An episode of Punt PI on BBC Radio 4, in which Steve Punt investigated the incident, was broadcast on 24 August 2013. Prior to the broadcast, radio researchers had reached out through the Mansfield local newspaper appealing for any locals to come forward at their expected visit into the area on 25 June. They also confirmed that an official report into the incident was produced but could not be traced afterwards.

This was followed by a further examination during the second episode of Mystery Map on ITV on 27 November 2013.

On the 42nd anniversary of the incident at "the Fainting Field", a BBC local radio reporter created a podcast recounting the events, and investigating what could have happened by consulting a forensic science lecturer from Nottingham Trent University, who hypothesised that different cleaning products could have been used in a temporary toilet block. When combined, these could have created chlorine gas, which can produce similar symptoms to those reported.
