= Ethoprophos =

Chemical compound

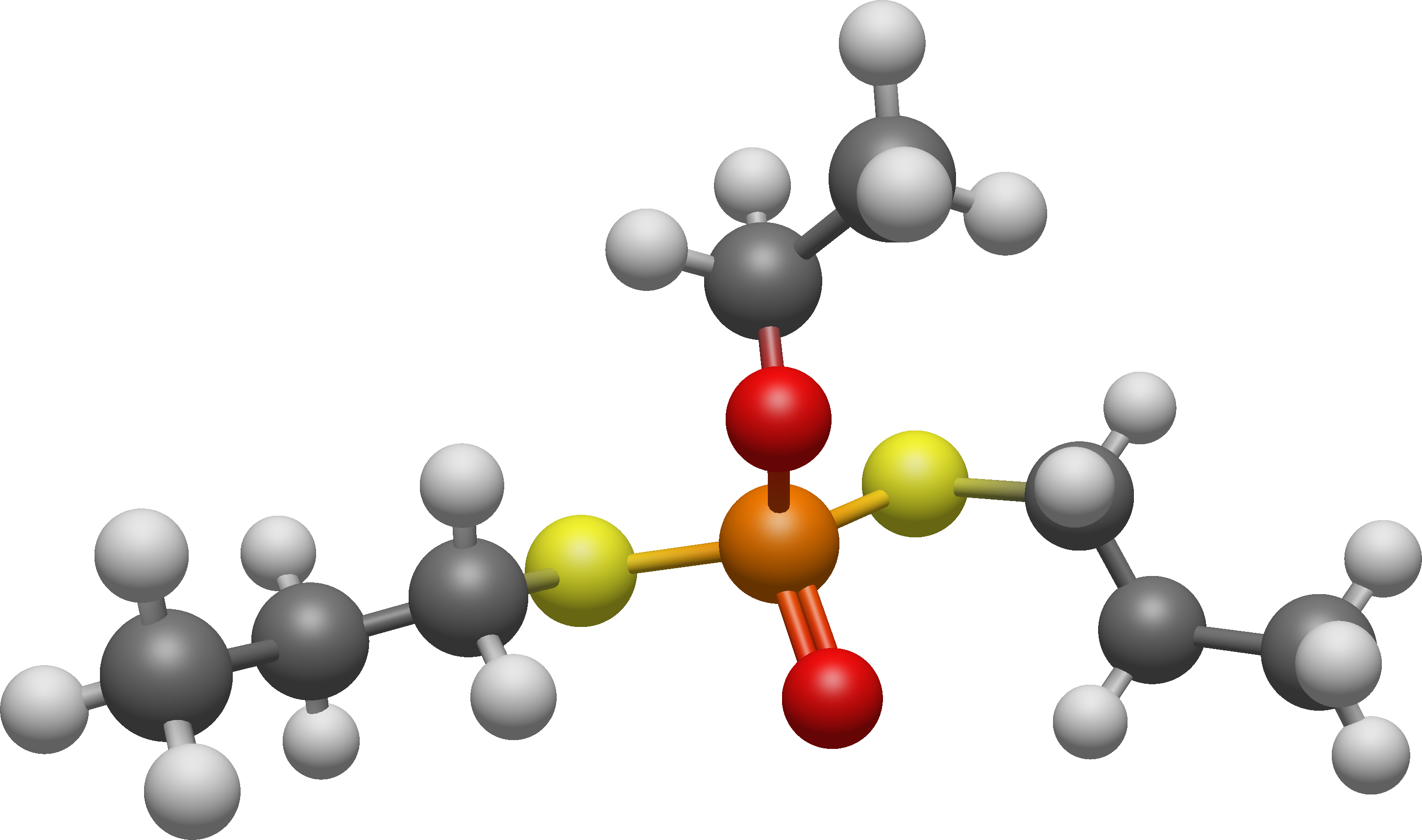

Names
- Preferred IUPAC name O-Ethyl S,S-dipropyl phosphorodithioate
- Other names Ethoprophos, Prophos, Mocap

Identifiers
| CAS Number | 13194-48-4 |
| 3D model (JSmol) | Interactive image |
| ChEBI | CHEBI:38665 |
| ChEMBL | ChEMBL1894994 |
| ChemSpider | 3173 |
| ECHA InfoCard | 100.032.851 |
| EC Number | 236-152-1 |
| KEGG | C18687 |
| PubChem CID | 3289 |
| RTECS number | TE4025000 |
| UNII | 765Y5683OQ |
| UN number | 3018 |
| CompTox Dashboard (EPA) | DTXSID4032611 |
- InChI: InChI=1S/C8H19O2PS2/c1-4-7-12-11(9,10-6-3)13-8-5-2/h4-8H2,1-3H3 Key: VJYFKVYYMZPMAB-UHFFFAOYSA-N; InChI=1/C8H19O2PS2/c1-4-7-12-11(9,10-6-3)13-8-5-2/h4-8H2,1-3H3 Key: VJYFKVYYMZPMAB-UHFFFAOYAE
- SMILES: O=P(SCCC)(OCC)SCCC

Properties
| Chemical formula | C_{8}H_{19}O_{2}PS_{2} |
| Molar mass | 242.33 g·mol^{−1} |
| Appearance | Colourless to yellow clear liquid |
| Odor | Mercaptan-like |
| Density | 1.069 g/ml |
| Melting point | <-70 °C (-94 °F, 203 K) |
| Boiling point | 244.3 °C (471.7 °F, 517.5 K) (decomposes) |
| Solubility in water | 1.3-1.4 mg/L (water) |
| Vapor pressure | 78 mPa (20 °C), 128 mPa (25 °C) |

Hazards
- Occupational safety and health (OHS/OSH)
| Main hazards | Toxic |
- GHS labelling
| Pictograms | (GHS08: Health hazard) (GHS09: Environmental hazard) |
| Signal word | Danger |
| Hazard statements | H301, H310, H317, H330, H410 |
| Precautionary statements | P260, P262, P264, P270, P271, P272, P273, P280, P284, P301+P310, P302+P350, P302+P352, P304+P340, P310, P320, P321, P330, P333+P313, P361, P363, P391, P403+P233, P405, P501 |
| Flash point | 141 °C |
| Autoignition temperature | 280 °C (536 °F; 553 K) |
- Except where otherwise noted, data are given for materials in their standard state (at 25 °C [77 °F], 100 kPa). verify (what is ?) Infobox references

Ethoprophos (or ethoprop) is an organophosphate ester with the formula C_{8}H_{19}O_{2}PS_{2}. It is a clear yellow to colourless liquid that has a characteristic mercaptan-like odour. It is used as an insecticide and nematicide and it is an acetylcholinesterase inhibitor.

== Synthesis ==
Ethoprop can be synthesised by reacting phosphoryl chloride with two equivalents of n-propylmercaptan and one equivalent of sodium ethoxide. A second pathway is reacting n-propylmercaptan and sodium ethoxide with phosphorus trichloride to yield ethoxy-bis(propylsulfanyl)phosphane, which can then be oxidized by hydrogen peroxide to yield the product.

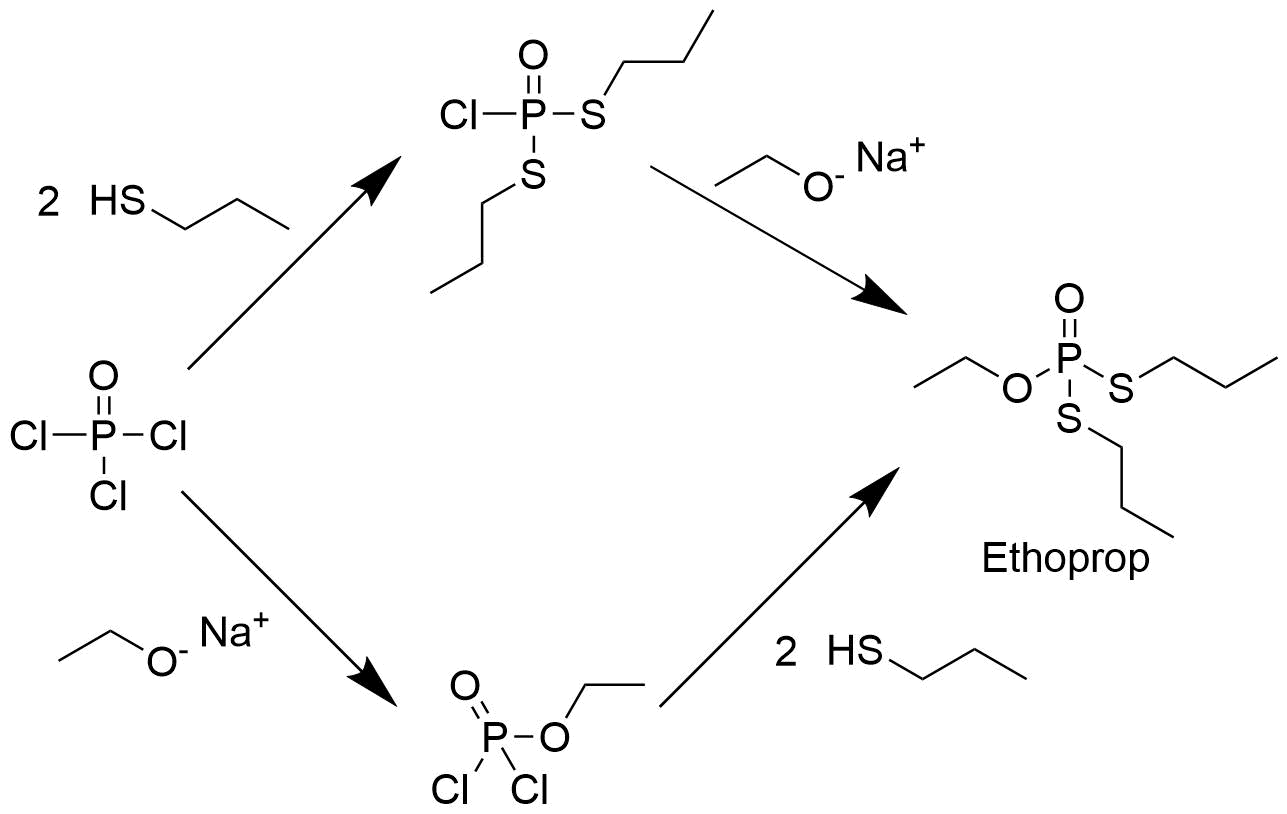
Two syntheses of ethoprop. The only difference is the order in which the alkyl groups are attached

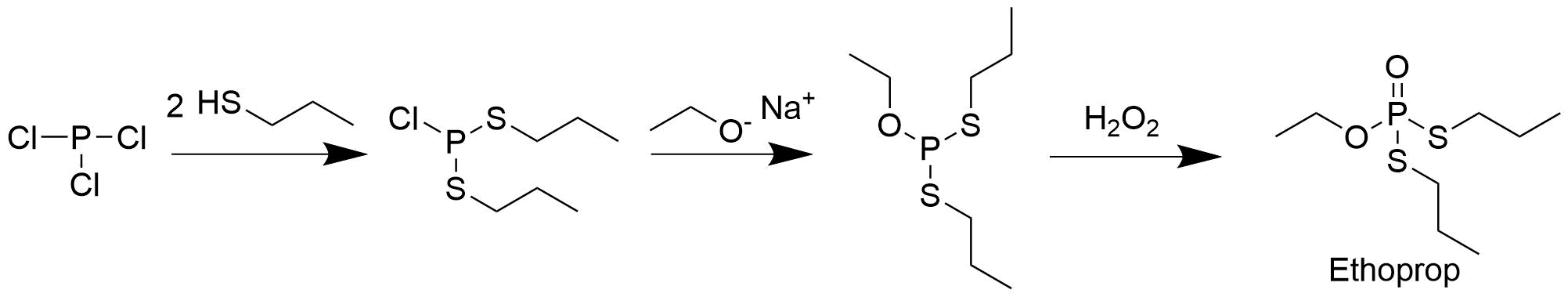
A different synthesis of ethoprop starting from phosphorus trichloride

== Applications ==
Ethoprop is used as an insecticide against soil insects like wireworms and as a nematicide. It is used on different crops, ranging from potatoes, bananas, and sugarcane to ornamental plants and tobacco. Most of the ethoprop used in the United States is applied to potatoes. In the period of 1987 to 1996, an estimated total of 691,000 pounds (313,400 kg) of the pesticide were used on field crops and vegetables.

== Toxicology ==
=== Mechanism of action ===
When an organism is exposed to ethoprophos either via the oral, dermal or inhalation routes, it primarily inhibits carboxyl ester hydrolases, specifically acetylcholinesterase (AChE). This enzyme is important in degradation of the neurotransmitter acetylcholine (ACh). Inactivation of AChE takes place by phosphorylation of serine hydroxyl group at the active site of AChE. Later, phosphorylation is followed by one of the following scenarios:

- endogenous hydrolysis of the phosphorylated enzyme by esterases or paraoxonases;
- reaction by a strong nucleophile such as pralidoxime (2-PAM);
- irreversible binding and permanent enzyme inactivation (also called aging).

When AChE is inactivated, ACh accumulates in the nervous system, which then results in overstimulation of muscarinic and nicotinic receptors.

Another target of ethoprophos is erythrocyte acetylcholinesterase. The only known location of this enzyme is on the outside of erythrocyte membranes. However, physiological functions of this AChE type are not completely known.

In cases of exposure to ethoprophos, symptoms may include vomiting, nausea, diarrhea, miosis, abdominal cramps, dyspnoea, muscular weakness, bronchial hypersecretion, anxiety, confusion and convulsions. In case of ethoprophos poisoning, a combination of atropine and pralidoxime (2-PAM) is the most effective antidote.

Additionally, ethoprophos is thought to be likely carcinogenic due to the occurrence of different types of tumors in rats after exposure to the compound. Dietary exposure (the most common route of exposure to ethoprophos) is so low, however, that there is a low risk for the general U.S. population.

=== Metabolism ===
In mammals, metabolism usually proceeds by removal of one or both of the propyl groups and subsequent conjugation. In rats, metabolism is independent of sex, dose, route of administration, or repeated administration, and no parent compound is detectable in faeces or urine. The main metabolite in humans is EPPA, shown below, which can be used as a biomarker for ethoprophos. The dealkylated metabolites have similar toxic effects to the parent compound.

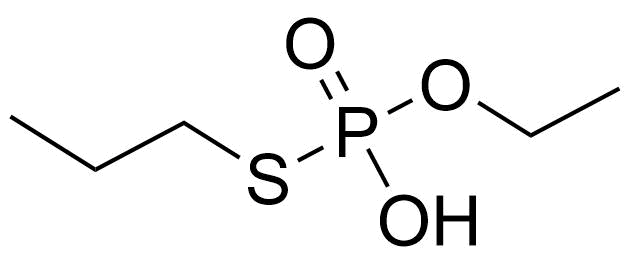
The structure of the main metabolite in humans, EPPA.

=== Distribution & Excretion ===
In tested animals, ethoprophos is widely distributed throughout the body, with the highest concentrations in the lungs, kidneys, and liver. In blood, it is mostly associated to cells instead of being in the plasma. Excretion mainly proceeds through the urine (~60%), but faecal excretion (~10%) and expired air (~15%) are also important routes. Intravenously dosed animals showed limited biliary excretion (~8%).

=== Effects on animals ===
Experiments carried out on ethoprophos have shown that the toxin affects animals in various manners. Short-term toxicity effects in rabbits and mice, exposed through different routes include inhibition of erythrocyte and brain cholinesterase. While experiments on dogs gave rise to cellular vacuolisation as well. Acute toxicity studies on rats, in turn have resulted in more effects being observed, namely narcotic, cholinergic and respiratory. The latter was shown to be expressed after a delay of 4 days and linked to an increase in lung weight. Studies carried out with extended exposure of ethoprophos in mice gave the same results as research on short-term exposure had, but in rats a fall in hemoglobin concentrations was also observed. On the other hand, a long-term exposure experiment conducted on dogs found that the toxin led to mild liver toxicity.

Furthermore, exposure to ethoprophos was found to affect reproduction as well. Parental toxicity in rats resulted in a drop in their body weight and food consumption. Moreover, abortion cases increased, leading to a reduction of litter sizes. On the other hand, offspring toxicity led to a decrease in body weight gain and rise in postnatal mortality.

Ethoprophos is considered to pose a low risk to mammals exposed to contaminated water as well as mammals feeding on contaminated fish. It is, however, extremely toxic to bees under direct exposure and also to birds which are exposed to the toxin through dietary routes. These involve ingestion of seeds or worms including residues of contaminated soil. Finally, a study showed that ethoprophos, along with 4 other active substances, was responsible for 40% of the utilized pesticides in Costa Rica, yet they contributed to more than three quarters of the aquatic toxicity. Thus, it has also been concluded to be highly toxic to aquatic species.

=== Exposure ===
When orally exposed to ethoprophos, absorption is fast and extensive: the time it takes to reach peak blood levels is below 1 hour and more than 90% of the substance is absorbed. Short-term dermal exposure to liquid ethoprophos was tested in rabbits in a 21 day long study. The dermal NOAEL was 0.1 mg/kg/day and the researchers found that there was acetylcholinesterase inhibition in plasma, erythrocytes and in the brain at a dose of 1.0 mg/kg/day. The short-term dermal exposure to granular ethoprophos was also studied. This study was conducted with rats and lasted for 28 days. In this case, a dermal NOAEL of 20 mg/kg/day was found. Acetylcholinesterase inhibition in plasma happened at a dose of 100 mg/kg/day. For short-term inhalation, a study was done with dogs and it lasted for 90 days. The results showed a NOAEL of 0.025 mg/kg/day and the acetylcholinesterase inhibition in plasma occurred at a dose of 0.075 mg/kg/day. No information about intermediate and long term exposure via dermal and inhalation routes is known at this moment. When rats were chronically exposed to ethoprophos with a dose of 2.81 x 10^-2 mg/kg/day, a number of rats developed malignant adrenal pheochromocytomas. For granular products, inhalation exposure is considered to be the main risk. In the case of liquid products dermal exposure is considered to be the main risk.
