= Hubert Chevis =

British Army lieutenant who died through strychnine poisoning (1902–1931)

- Born: Hubert George "Hugh" Chevis; 21 September 1902; Rawal Pindi, India
- Died: 21 June 1931 (aged 28); Surrey, England

Hubert George "Hugh" Chevis (21 September 1902 – 21 June 1931) was a lieutenant in the Royal Artillery of the British Army who died of strychnine poisoning in June 1931 after eating contaminated partridge.

The youngest son of Sir William and Amy Florence, Lady Chevis, née Dannenberg, Hubert Chevis was born at Rawalpindi, India. The first years of his life were spent in India. He later attended Charterhouse School in Surrey. Chevis graduated from the Royal Military Academy at Woolwich as a second lieutenant on 29 August 1923.

At the time of his death in 1931 Chevis was an instructor at the Aldershot Training Camp in Hampshire, and had been married for approximately six months to Frances (née Rollason), an extremely wealthy 29-year-old heiress. Chevis was her second husband, the first having been Major George Jackson, a veterinarian.

== Suspicious death ==
On the afternoon of 20 June 1931 the couple had friends over for cocktails at their Blackdown Camp bungalow. After their friends had left, the Chevises had a slightly earlier dinner than usual, as they wanted to attend the local military tattoo that night. Dinner was prepared by their cook, Ellen Yeomans, and served by their batman, Nicholas Bulger. Gunner Bulger served the Manchurian partridge, (Note: Also known as the Daurian partridge (Perdix daurica)) onto the sideboard in the dining room, where Mrs Chevis carved it. After Chevis had eaten a mouthful of the bird, he summoned Bulger, saying "Take this bird away. It is the most terrible thing I have tasted." His wife tasted the meat and agreed with him. The partridges were incinerated in the kitchen by Ellen Yeomans. Not long after ingesting the mouthful of partridge, Chevis started experiencing severe cramps and convulsions and a doctor was called. Later that evening, Mrs Chevis also fell ill. A second doctor was called and the couple was admitted to Frimley Cottage Hospital. Chevis died at 9.50 am the following morning after five doctors had administered artificial respiration over a period of several hours. Not long after having been admitted to hospital, both Hubert and Frances Chevis had been given powerful emetics. Two grains of strychnine were found in his stomach. Mrs Chevis subsequently recovered, as she had only tasted the meat.

Announcement of Chevis's death was made in the press on Monday, 22 June (The Times). On 24 June, Hubert Chevis's father, Sir William Chevis, received a telegram on the day of his son's funeral that said "Hooray, hooray, hooray!". It was sent from the Irish capital, Dublin, and signed "J. Hartigan". On the back of the telegram was written "Hibernian", a well-known hotel in Dublin. The local police were notified, but nobody of that name was found at the hotel. Subsequent enquiries undertaken by the Irish police found that a south Dublin chemist had sold strychnine about four weeks earlier to a man who was similar in appearance to the man who had sent the telegram in the name of J. Hartigan.

The Daily Sketch published a copy of the telegram, only to receive another telegram signed "J. Hartigan" that read, "Dear Sir, Why did you publish a picture of the Hooray telegram?" Chevis's father also received a postcard on 4 August 1931 from "J. Hartigan" that said, "It is a mystery they will never solve."

== Investigation ==
The shipment of Manchurian partridges from which the Chevis partridges had come was examined by experts, but they found no poisoned birds. Several people were interviewed, including Mrs Chevis and her former husband, G. T. T. Jackson of the Royal Army Veterinary Corps. Jackson denied that he had anything to do with the death of Chevis, stating that he was "miles away at Northampton" at the time. He added that he considered J. Hartigan, the man who sent the telegram, "a cad and a blackguard". Mrs Chevis was unable to shed any light on her husband's death. Irish police later identified the author of the telegram towards the end of 1931 and determined that apart from being mentally unbalanced, he had no other involvement in Chevis's death. Police records identifying this person have not survived.

Many theories were propounded about Chevis's death, but the investigation stalled because of a lack of evidence. After several weeks the coroner announced at the inquest, "There is no evidence on which you can find a definite verdict; therefore I direct you to find an open verdict." Chevis's case is often referred to as a murder case, but this is incorrect. As the coroner returned an open verdict, in a legal sense this meant that he was unable to confirm whether Chevis has died by accident or misadventure, suicide, murder or manslaughter. Legally, Chevis's death should be referred to as a suspicious death.

== Media ==
The case was the subject of a documentary on BBC Radio 4 on 3 September 2011, part of the Punt PI series presented by Steve Punt. Lack of evidence prevented the programme from reaching any firm conclusions, but it noted that none of the initial suspects had both the motive and opportunity. It also conjectured that both Chevis and his father, Sir William Chevis, had strong connections to the British Raj, and that 'J Hartigan' is an anagram of 'Raj hating'.
