= Tridemorph =

Names
- Preferred IUPAC name 2,6-Dimethyl-4-tridecylmorpholine

Identifiers
CAS Number	24602-86-6
3D model (JSmol)	Interactive image
ChEBI	CHEBI:9700
ChemSpider	30142
EC Number	246-347-3
KEGG	C11285
MeSH	C015554
PubChem CID	32518
UNII	784443KX6H
- InChI: InChI=1S/C19H39NO/c1-4-5-6-7-8-9-10-11-12-13-14-15-20-16-18(2)21-19(3)17-20/h18-19H,4-17H2,1-3H3 Key: YTOPFCCWCSOHFV-UHFFFAOYSA-N
- SMILES: CCCCCCCCCCCCCN1CC(OC(C1)C)C

Properties
Chemical formula	C_{19}H_{39}NO
Molar mass	297.527 g·mol^{−1}
- Except where otherwise noted, data are given for materials in their standard state (at 25 °C [77 °F], 100 kPa). Infobox references

Tridemorph is a fungicide used to control Erysiphe graminis. It was developed by BASF in the 1960s who use the trade name Calixin. The World Health Organization has categorized it as a Class II "moderately hazardous" pesticide because it is believed harmful if swallowed and can cause irritation to skin and eyes.

One theory for the cause of the Hollinwell incident is that it might have been caused by inhalation of tridemorph.
