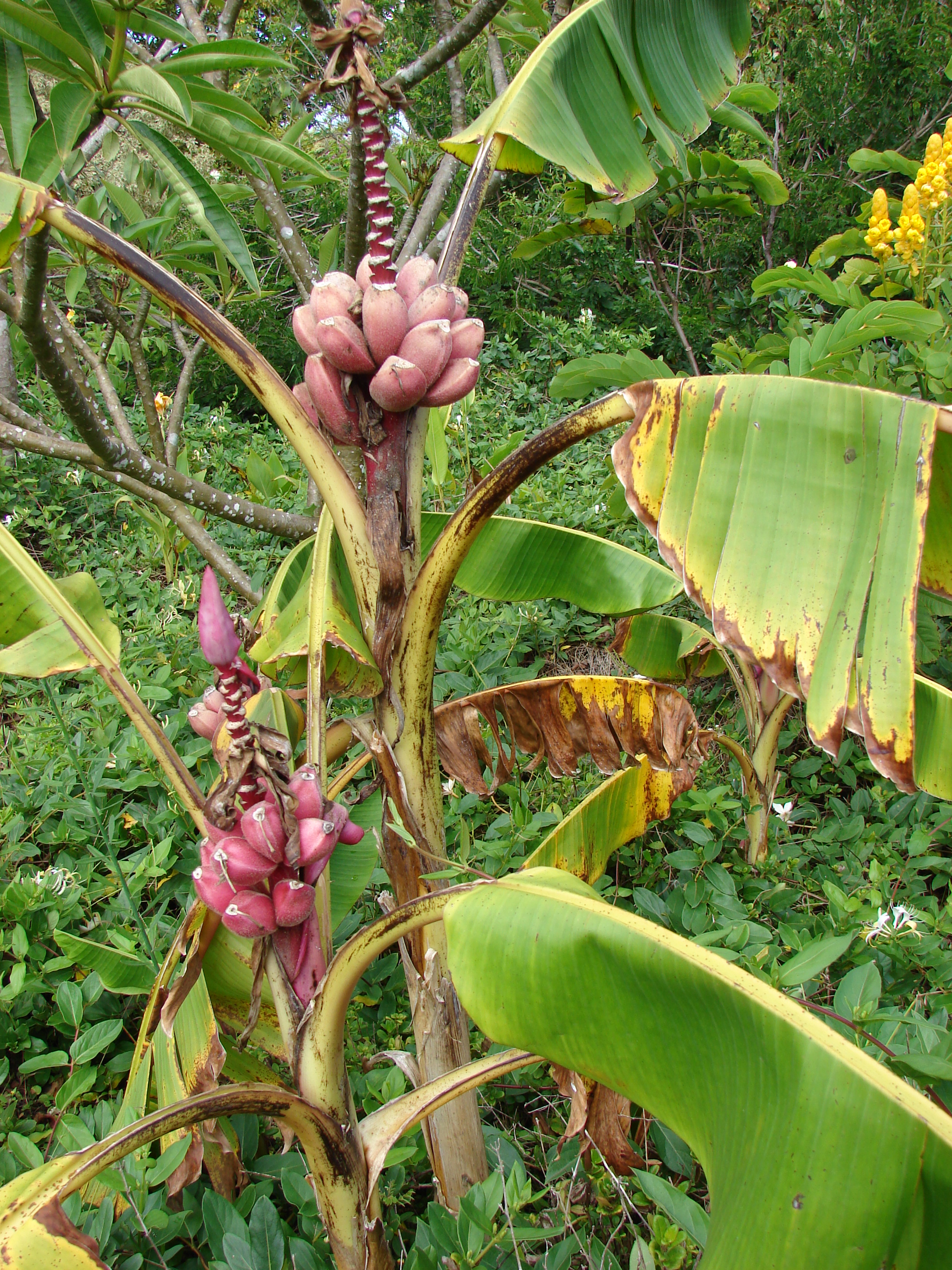

Scientific classification
- Kingdom: Plantae
- Clade: Tracheophytes
- Clade: Angiosperms
- Clade: Monocots
- Clade: Commelinids
- Order: Zingiberales
- Family: Musaceae
- Genus: Musa
- Section: Musa sect. Musa
- Species: M. velutina

Binomial name
- Musa velutina H. Wendl. & Drude

= Musa velutina =

Species of flowering plant

Musa velutina, the hairy banana or pink banana, is a diploid species of wild banana. These plants are originally from Assam and the eastern Himalayas.

The fruits are 3 in (8 cm) long, pink, and fuzzy. They are borne on erect flower stalks with a pink inflorescence. Musa velutina flowers at a young age, doing so within a year. The fruits peel back when ripe.

It is often grown as an ornamental plant, but has soft, sweet flesh that can be eaten. The seeds are quite tough and can chip a tooth. To sow, first soak the seeds in warm water for 24 hours. They should be planted in fine compost and kept at a constant temperature of 20–24 °C (68–75 °F) with full natural light. They take up to around 6 months to germinate.

Plants may be placed outside during warmer months but should be taken into a conservatory or greenhouse or given other protection in winter. Musa velutina has received the Royal Horticultural Society's Award of Garden Merit.

== Gallery ==
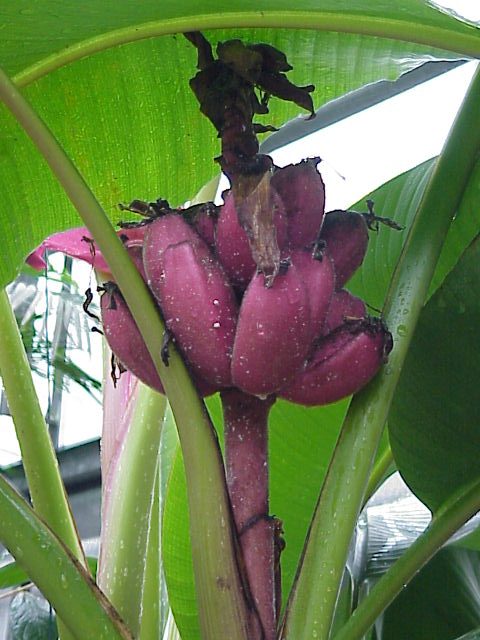

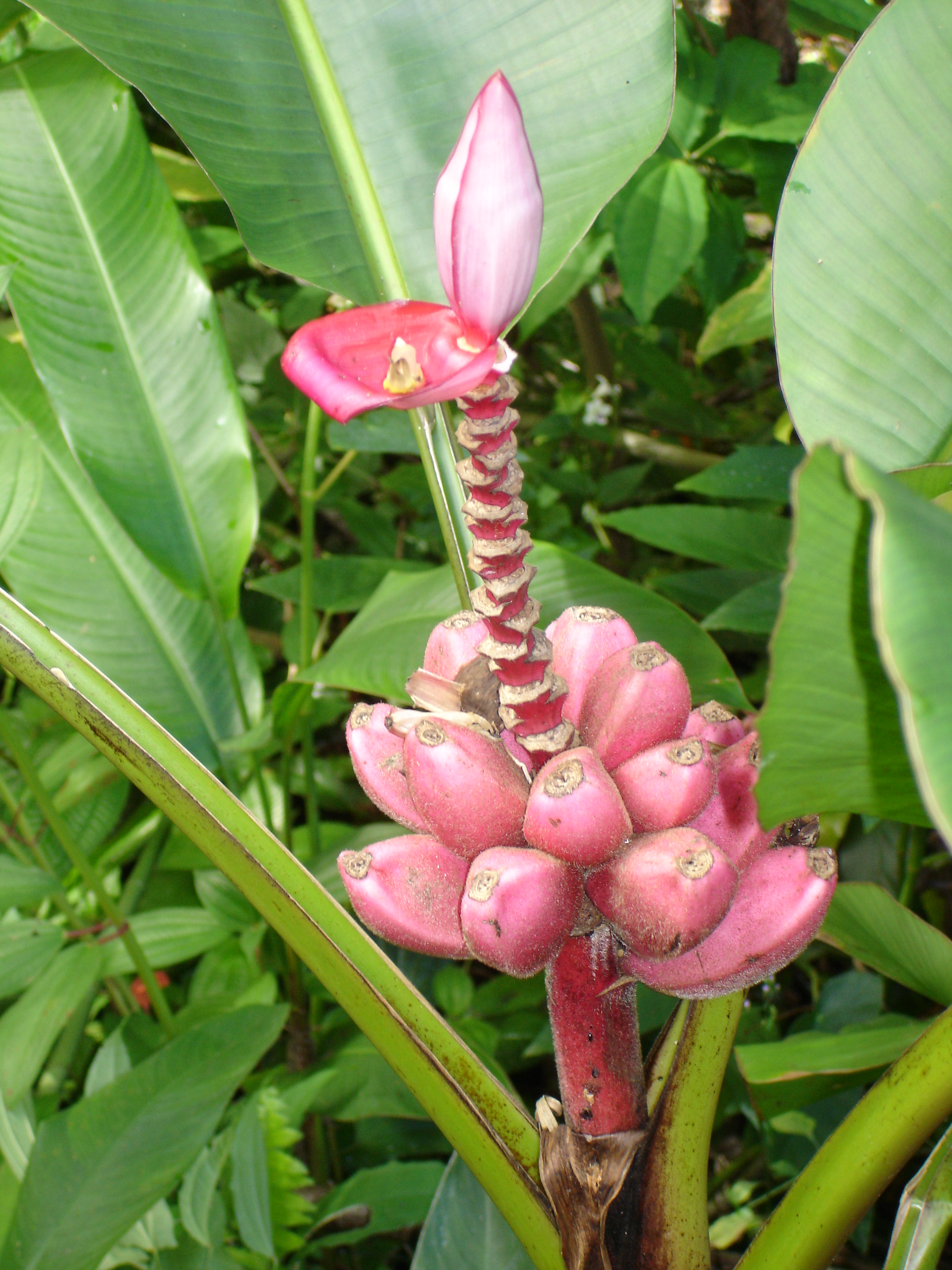

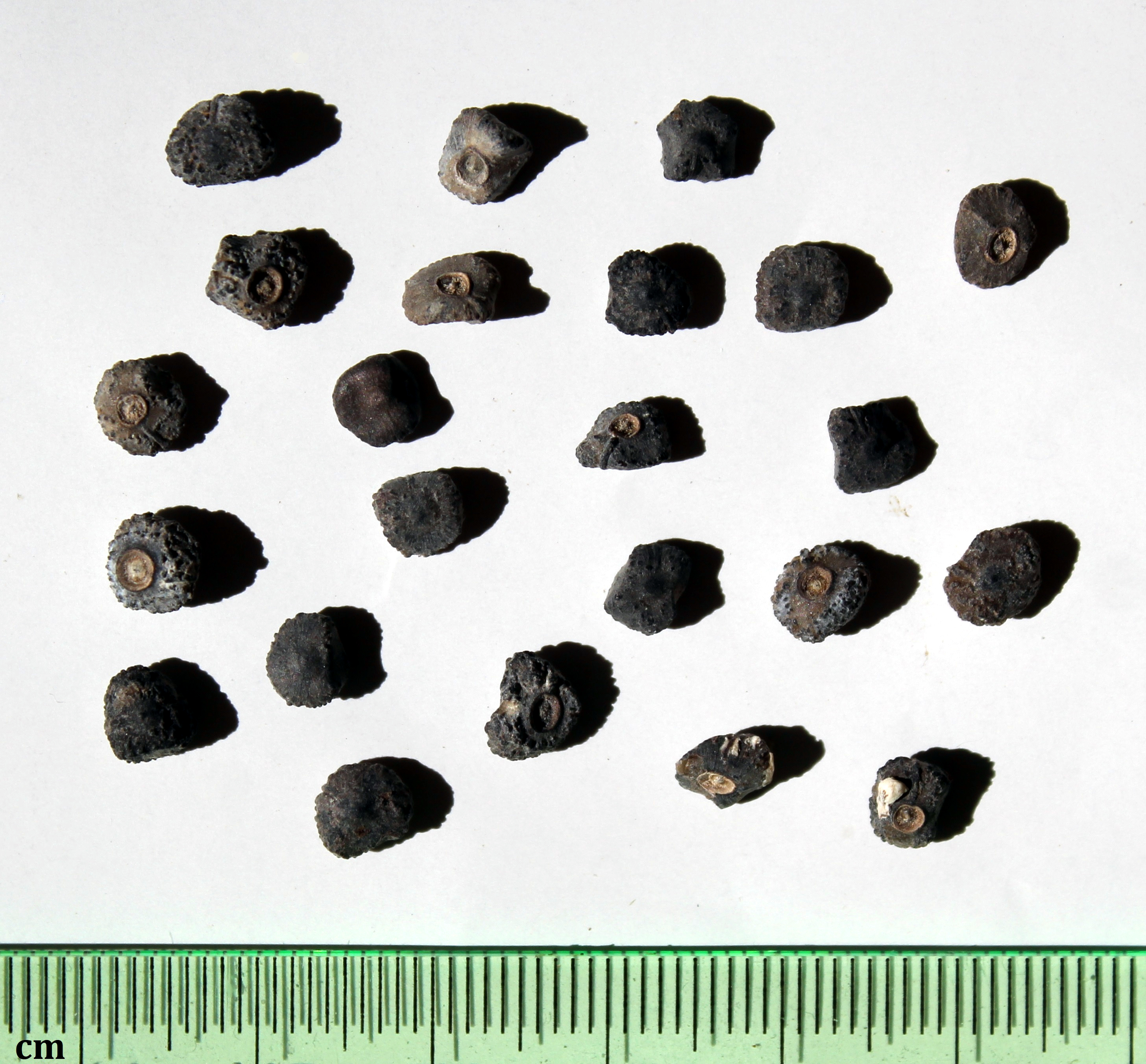
Seeds
