= List of Toilet-Bound Hanako-kun chapters =

Toilet-Bound Hanako-kun is written and illustrated by AidaIro. The series started in the July 2014 issue of Square Enix's Monthly GFantasy, published on June 18, 2014. Square Enix has compiled its chapters into individual tankōbon volumes. The first volume was published on May 22, 2015. A volume 0 was released on December 27, 2019. As of October 27, 2025, 25 volumes have been published.

In North America, Yen Press announced in July 2017 that they would publish the manga digitally. In July 2019, Yen Press announced the print release of the series.

A spin-off manga series titled Hōkago Shōnen Hanako-kun launched online on February 22, 2018. It was licensed by Yen Press under the title After-School Hanako-kun; and released in April 2021.

== Volumes ==
=== Toilet-Bound Hanako-kun ===
No.	Original release date	Original ISBN	English release date	English ISBN
0	December 27, 2019	978-4-7575-6454-1	December 14, 2021 (digital); December 14, 2021 (print)	978-1-9753-2481-0
Spook 1: Hanako-san of the Toilet (トイレの花子さん, Toire no Hanako-san); Spook 2: The Boy Exorcist (少年陰陽師, Shōnen Onmyōji); Spook 3: The Fox Window (きつねの窓, Kitsune no Mado); One-Shot Comic: My Dear Living Dead (愛しのリビングデッド, Itoshino Ribingu Deddo)
1	May 22, 2015	978-4-7575-4662-2	August 29, 2017 (digital); January 28, 2020 (print)	978-1-9753-3287-7
Spook 1: Hanako-san of the Toilet (トイレの花子さん, Toire no Hanako-san); Spook 2: The Faeries (ようせいさん, Yōsei-san); Spook 3: The Boy Exorcist (祓い屋少年, Haraiya Shōnen); Spook 4: The Misaki Stairs Part 1 (ミサキ階段 其の一, Misaki Kaidan sono ichi); Spook 5: The Misaki Stairs Part 2 (ミサキ階段 其の二, Misaki Kaidan sono ni)
2	November 21, 2015	978-4-7575-4819-0	October 31, 2017 (digital); March 17, 2020 (print)	978-1-9753-9957-3
Spook 6: The Misaki Stairs Part 3 (ミサキ階段 其の三, Misaki Kaidan sono san); Spook 7: The Misaki Stairs Part 4 (ミサキ階段 其の四, Misaki Kaidan sono yon); Spook 8: The Confession Tree (告白の木, Kokuhaku no Ki); Spook 9: The Young Exorcist Part 1 (祓い屋の青年 其の一, Haraiya no Seinen sono ichi); Spook 10: The Young Exorcist Part 2 (祓い屋の青年 其の二, Haraiya no Seinen sono ni)
3	May 27, 2016	978-4-7575-5000-1	December 26, 2017 (digital); May 19, 2020 (print)	978-1-9753-1135-3
Spook 11: The 4pm Bookstacks Part 1 (16時の書庫 其の一, Jū Roku-Ji no Shoko sono ichi); Spook 12: The 4pm Bookstacks Part 2 (16時の書庫 其の二, Jū Roku-Ji no Shoko sono ni); Spook 13: The 4pm Bookstacks Part 3 (16時の書庫 其の三, Jū Roku-Ji no Shoko sono san); Spook 14: The 4pm Bookstacks Part 4 (16時の書庫 其の四, Jū Roku-Ji no Shoko sono yon); Spook 15: The Donuts (ドーナツ, Dōnatsu)
4	September 27, 2016	978-4-7575-5112-1	February 27, 2018 (digital); July 21, 2020 (print)	978-1-9753-1136-0
Spook 16: The Little Mermaid Part 1 (人魚姫 其の一, Ningyo Hime sono ichi); Spook 17: The Little Mermaid Part 2 (人魚姫 其の二, Ningyo Hime sono ni); Spook 18: Mitsuba Part 1 (ミツバ 其の一, Mitsuba sono ichi); Spook 19: Mitsuba Part 2 (ミツバ 其の二, Mitsuba sono ni); Spook 20: Mitsuba Part 3 (ミツバ 其の三, Mitsuba sono san)
5	February 27, 2017	978-4-7575-5259-3	April 24, 2018 (digital); October 20, 2020 (print)	978-1-9753-5472-5
Spook 21: The Tea Party Part 1 (お茶会 其の一, Ochakai sono ichi); Spook 22: The Tea Party Part 2 (お茶会 其の二, Ochakai sono ni); Spook 23: The Three Clock Keepers Part 1 (三人の時計守 其の一, San'nin no Tokei Mori sono ichi); Spook 24: The Three Clock Keepers Part 2 (三人の時計守 其の二, San'nin no Tokei Mori sono ni); Spook 25: The Three Clock Keepers Part 3 (三人の時計守 其の三, San'nin no Tokei Mori sono san); Special Short Story: The Hoodlum and the Four-Eyes, Love and War (不良とメガネと恋と戦争, Furyō to Megane to Koi to Sensō)
6	July 27, 2017	978-4-7575-5427-6	June 26, 2018 (digital); December 8, 2020 (print)	978-1-9753-0281-8
Spook 26: The Three Clock Keepers Part 4 (三人の時計守 其の四, San'nin no Tokei Mori sono yon); Spook 27: The Three Clock Keepers Part 5 (三人の時計守 其の五, San'nin no Tokei Mori sono go); Spook 28: Searching Part 1 (さがしもの 其のー, Sagashimono sono ichi); Spook 29: Searching Part 2 (さがしもの 其の二, Sagashimono sono ni); Spook 30: Reach Out Your Hand (てをのばす, Te o nobasu)
7	December 27, 2017	978-4-7575-5572-3	August 28, 2018 (digital); February 23, 2021 (print)	978-1-9753-2794-1
Spook 31: The Hell of Mirrors Part 1 (カガミジゴク 其のー, Kagamijigoku sono ichi); Spook 32: The Hell of Mirrors Part 2 (カガミジゴク 其の二, Kagamijigoku sono ni); Spook 33: The Hell of Mirrors Part 3 (カガミジゴク 其の三, Kagamijigoku sono san); Spook 34: The Hell of Mirrors Part 4 (カガミジゴク 其の四, Kagamijigoku sono yon); Spook 35: The Hell of Mirrors Part 5 (カガミジゴク 其の五, Kagamijigoku sono go)
8	May 26, 2018	978-4-7575-5732-1	October 30, 2018 (digital); March 23, 2021 (print)	978-1-9753-5630-9
Spook 36: Delivery (とどけもの, Todokemono); Spook 37: Summer Lights Part 1 (夏灯り 其の一, Natsu Akari sono ichi); Spook 38: Summer Lights Part 2 (夏灯り 其の二, Natsu Akari sono ni); Spook 39: Mokke of the Dead (もっけ・オブ・ザ・デッド, Mokke obu za Deddo); Spook 40: The Melancholy of the New No. 3 (新・三番の憂鬱, Shin Sanban no Yūutsu)
9	October 26, 2018	978-4-7575-5900-4	January 29, 2019 (digital); June 22, 2021 (print)	978-1-9753-1141-4
Spook 41: Picture Perfect Part 1 (エソラゴト 其の一, Esoragoto sono ichi); Spook 42: Picture Perfect Part 2 (エソラゴト 其の二, Esoragoto sono ni); Spook 43: Picture Perfect Part 3 (エソラゴト 其の三, Esoragoto sono san); Spook 44: Picture Perfect Part 4 (エソラゴト 其の四, Esoragoto sono yon); Spook 45: Picture Perfect Part 5 (エソラゴト 其の五, Esoragoto sono go)
10	March 27, 2019	978-4-7575-5900-4	April 28, 2020 (digital); July 20, 2021 (print)	978-1-9753-9900-9
Spook 46: Picture Perfect Part 6 (エソラゴト 其の六, Esoragoto sono roku); Spook 47: Picture Perfect Part 7 (エソラゴト 其の七, Esoragoto sono nana); Spook 48: Picture Perfect Part 8 (エソラゴト 其の八, Esoragoto sono hachi); Spook 49: Picture Perfect Part 9 (エソラゴト 其の九, Esoragoto sono kyū); Spook 50: Picture Perfect Part 10 (エソラゴト 其の十, Esoragoto sono jū)
11	August 27, 2019	978-4-7575-6147-2; 978-4-7575-6148-9 (SP)	May 26, 2020 (digital); September 21, 2021 (print)	978-1-9753-1682-2
Spook 51: Perfectly Empty Ideas (キレイゴト, Kireigoto); Spook 52: Picture of a Wish (ネガイゴト, Negaigoto); Spook 53: Imperfect Secrecy (カクシゴト, Kakushigoto); Spook 54: Self-Portrait (ヒトリゴト, Hitorigoto); Spook 55: Perfect Nonsense (ヨマイゴト, Yomaigoto)
12	December 27, 2019	978-4-7575-6330-8; 978-4-7575-6331-5 (SP)	June 30, 2020 (digital); November 16, 2021 (print)	978-1-9753-1688-4
Spook 56: The End of Dream Part 1 (夢の終わり 其の一, Yume no Owari sono ichi); Spook 57: The End of Dream Part 2 (夢の終わり 其の二, Yume no Owari sono ni); Spook 58: The End of Dream Part 3 (夢の終わり 其の三, Yume no Owari sono san); Spook 59: Final Exams (期末試験, Kimatsu Shiken); Spook 60: The School Sleepover Part 1 (宿泊学習 其の一, Shukuhaku Gakushū sono ichi)
13	May 27, 2020	978-4-7575-6661-3	August 18, 2020 (digital); January 18, 2022 (print)	978-1-9753-1908-3
Spook 61: The School Sleepover Part 2 (宿泊学習 其の二, Shukuhaku Gakushū sono ni); Spook 62: The Elevator (エレベーター, Erebētā); Spook 63: Sacrifice of the Grim Reaper Part 1 (死神の生贄 其の一, Shinigami no Ikenie sono ichi); Spook 64: Sacrifice of the Grim Reaper Part 2 (死神の生贄 其の二, Shinigami no Ikenie sono ni); Spook 65: The School Sleepover Part 3 (宿泊学習 其の三, Shukuhaku Gakushū sono san)
14	November 27, 2020	978-4-7575-6965-2	June 29, 2021 (digital); May 17, 2022 (print)	978-1-9753-3851-0
Spook 66: Sumire Part 1 (スミレ 其の一, Sumire sono ichi); Spook 67: Sumire Part 2 (スミレ 其の二, Sumire sono ni); Spook 68: Sumire Part 3 (スミレ 其の三, Sumire sono san); Spook 69: Aoi and Akane Part 1 (アオイとアカネ 其の一, Aoi to Akane sono ichi); Spook 70: Aoi and Akane Part 2 (アオイとアカネ 其の二, Aoi to Akane sono ni)
15	April 27, 2021	978-4-7575-7224-9; 978-4-7575-7225-6 (SP)	July 27, 2021 (digital); July 19, 2022 (print)	978-1-9753-3853-4
Spook 71: Severance (断絶, Danzetsu); Spook 72: Day Off (休日, Kyūjitsu); Spook 73: At the Minamoto Home (源家にて, Minamoto Ke Mite); Spook 74: Loss (喪失, Sōshitsu); Spook 75: Chance Encounter (遭遇, Sōgū)
16	September 27, 2021	978-4-7575-7495-3	February 22, 2022 (digital); September 20, 2022 (print)	978-1-9753-4734-5
Spook 76: The Red House Part 1 (赤い家, Akai Ie); Spook 77: The Red House Part 2 (赤い家 其の二, Akai Ie sono ni); Spook 78: The Red House Part 3 (赤い家 其の三, Akai Ie sono san); Spook 79: The Red House Part 4 (赤い家 其の四, Akai Ie sono yon); Spook 80: The Red House Part 5 (赤い家 其の五, Akai Ie Sono go)
17	February 26, 2022	978-4-7575-7760-2	June 21, 2022 (digital); February 21, 2023 (print)	978-1-9753-5935-5
Spook 81: The Red House Part 6 (赤い家 其の六, Akai Ie sono Roku); Spook 82: The Red House Part 7 (赤い家 其の七, Akai Ie sono nana); Spook 83: Pizza Party (ピザパーティー, Pizapātī); Spook 84: Far Shore Bound Part 1 (彼岸行, Higan yuki); Spook 85: Far Shore Bound Part 2 (彼岸行 其の二, Higan yuki sono ni)
18	August 26, 2022	978-4-7575-8096-1	July 18, 2023 (print)	978-1-9753-6979-8
Spook 86: Far Shore Bound (Part 3) (彼岸行 其の三, Higan yuki sono san); Spook 87: Brothers (兄弟, Kyoudai); Spook 88: Demon Part 1 (鬼, Oni); Spook 89: Demon Part 2 (鬼 其の二, Oni sono ni); Spook 90: Demon Part 3 (鬼 其の三, Oni sono san); Spook 91: Fixing Mistakes Part 1 (矯正, Kyōsei)
19	February 27, 2023	978-4-7575-8329-0	December 12, 2023 (print)	978-1-9753-7583-6
Spook 92: Fixing Mistakes Part 2 (矯正 其の二, Kyōsei sono ni); Spook 93: Dawn Part 1 (夜明 其の一, Yoake sono ichi); Spook 94: Dawn Part 2 (夜明 其の二, Yoake sono ni); Spook 95: Dawn Part 3 (夜明 其の三, Yoake sono san); Spook 96: Fireworks Party (花火パーティー, Hanabi pātī); Spook 97: Fireworks Party Part 2 (花火パーティー 其の二, Hanabi pātī sono ni)
20	August 25, 2023	978-4-7575-8636-9; 978-4-7575-8637-6 (SP)	September 17, 2024 (print)	979-8-8554-0073-1
Spook 98: The Nightlife (夜遊び 其の一, Yoasobi sono ichi); Spook 99: The Nightlife Part 2 (夜遊び 其の二, Yoasobi sono ni); Spook 100: The Nightlife Part 3 (夜遊び 其の三, Yoasobi sono san); Spook 101: Omen Part 1 (前兆 其の一, Zenchō sono ichi); Spook 102: Omen Part 2 (前兆 其の二, Zenchō sono ni)
21	February 27, 2024	978-4-7575-9065-6	January 21, 2025 (print)	979-8-8554-1019-8
Spook 103: Omen Part 3 (前兆 其の三, Zenchō sono san); Spook 104: School Festival Part 1 (学園祭 其の一, Gakuen-sai sono ichi); Spook 105: School Festival Part 2 (学園祭 其の二, Gakuen-sai sono ni); Spook 106: Mismatched (ちぐはぐ, Chiguhagu); Spook 107: Mismatched Part 2 (ちぐはぐ 其の二, Chiguhagu sono ni)
22	July 26, 2024	978-4-7575-9315-2	July 22, 2025 (print)	979-8-8554-1607-7
Spook 108: The Clock Keepers' Court (時計守裁判, Tokeimori saiban); Spook 109: The Clock Keepers' Court Part 2 (時計守裁判 其の二, Tokeimori saiban sono ni); Spook 110: The Clock Keepers' Court Part 3 (時計守裁判 其の三, Tokeimori saiban sono san); Spook 111: The Clock Keepers' Court Part 4 (時計守裁判 其の四, Tokeimori saiban sono yon); Spook 112: Alteration (改変, Kaihen)
23	December 27, 2024	978-4-7575-9589-7	October 28, 2025 (print)	979-8-8554-2473-7
Spook 113: Alteration Part 2 (改変 其の二, Kaihen sono ni); Spook 114: Alteration Part 3 (改変 其の三, Kaihen sono san); Spook 115: Alteration Part 4 (改変 其の四, Kaihen sono yon); Spook 116: Alteration Part 5 (改変 其の五, Kaihen sono go); Spook 117: Alteration Part 6 (改変其の六, Kaihen sono roku)
24	June 26, 2025	978-4-7575-9919-2	July 28, 2026 (print)	979-8-8554-3536-8
Spook 118: About Our Dreams (夢の話, Yume no hanashi); Spook 119: Happiness (しあわせ, Shiawase); Spook 120: Happiness Part 2 (しあわせ 其の二, Shiawase sono ni); Spook 121: Happiness Part 3 (しあわせ 其の三, Shiawase sono san); Spook 122: Happiness Part 4 (しあわせ 其の四, Shiawase sono yon)
25	October 27, 2025	978-4-7575-9981-9; 978-4-7575-9877-5 (SP)	November 24, 2026 (print)	979-8-8554-4199-4
Spook 123: Cat (猫, Kyatto); Spook 124: A Snowy Town (雪の街, Yuki no Machi); Spook 125: Memories of the Sand (砂の記憶, Suna no Kioku); Spook 126: Again and Again (何度でも, Nandodemo); Spook 127: Back In Time (時間遡行, Jikan sokō)
26	November 27, 2026	978-4-301-00665-7; 978-4-301-00666-4 (SP)		

==== Chapters not yet in tankōbon format ====
- Spook 128: Chance Encounter (邂逅, Kaikou)
- Spook 129: Chance Encounter Part 2 (邂逅其の二, Kaikou sono ni)
- Spook 130: Chance Encounter Part 3 (邂逅其の三, Kaikou sono san)
- Spook 131: Chance Encounter Part 4 (邂逅其の四, Kaikou sono yon)
- Spook 132: Chance Encounter Part 5 (邂逅其の五, Kaikou sono gon)
- Spook 133: Chance Encounter Part 6 (邂逅其の六, Kaikou sono roku)
- Spook 134: Leap (跳躍, Chōyaku)

=== After-School Hanako-kun ===
No.	Original release date	Original ISBN	English release date	English ISBN
1	August 27, 2019	978-4-7575-6262-2	April 27, 2021	978-1-9753-2435-3
Day 1: After-school Hanako-kun (放課後少年花子くん, Hōkago Shōnen Hanako-kun); Day 2: Game of Kings (王様ゲーム, Ōsama gēmu); Day 3: Mokke Be Ambitious (もっけの野望, Mokke no yabō); Day 4: Table-turning (こっくりさん, Kokkuri-san); Day 5: After-school Broadcasting Room (放課後の放送室, Hōkago no hōsō-shitsu); Day 6: After-school Student Union Room (放課後の生徒会室, Hōkago no seitokaishitsu); Day 7: The Summer Demon ~Toilet Bound Girl Hanako-san~ (夏の魔物～地縛少女花子さん～, Natsu no mamono ~Jibaku Shōjo Hanako-san~); Day 8: The Summer Demon ~Reprise~ (夏の魔物〜再来〜, Natsu no mamono ~Sairai~); Day 9: True Of Mokke (トゥルー・オブ・もっけ, Tourū・Obu・Mokke); Day 10: The High School Division's Monster (高等部の怪, Kōtō-bu no kai); Day 11: Supernatural Cold (怪異風邪, Kaii kaze); Day 12: Mitsuba's Epic Friend Operation (ミツバの友達大作戦, Mitsuba no tomodachi dai sakusen); Day 13: Mokke In The House! (もっけが家にやってきた！, Mokke ga ie ni yattekita!); Day 14: After-school Love (放課後の恋心, Hōkago no koigokoro); Day 15: After-school Vacation (放課後のバカンス, Hōkago no bakansu)
2	February 27, 2024	978-4-7575-9066-3	October 27, 2026	979-8-8554-3984-7
Day 16: Nightmare (悪夢, Akumu); Day 17: Convenience Store (コンビニ, Konbini); Day 18: Evil Switch (悪良スイッチ, Aku Ryō Suitchi); Day 19: After-School Cafe (放課後の喫茶店, Hōkago no Kissaten); Day 20: Cooking Class (お料理教室, O Ryōri Kyōshitsu); Day 21: Mokke's Love Advice (もっけの恋愛相談, Mokke no Ren'ai Sōdan); Day 22: Please, Shijima-San! (お願いシジマさん！, Onegai shijima-san!); Day 23: First Errand (はじめてのおつかい, Hajimete nō tsukai); Day 24: Names (名前, Namae); Day 25: After-School Mokke (放課後もっけ, Hōkago mo kke); Day 26: The Cursed Cat Ears (呪いのネコミミ, Noroi no nekomimi); Day 27: Ghost Stories (百物語, Hyakumonogatari)

==== Chapters not yet in tankōbon format ====
- Day 28: Hardware Store (ホームセンター, Hōmusentā)
