= Seikei Zusetsu =

Japanese agricultural encyclopaedia

The Seikei Zusetsu (Japanese: 成形図説) is a Japanese agricultural encyclopedia compiled from 1793 to 1804 at the order of Shimazu Shigehide, the ruler of Satsuma Province (now approximately Kagoshima Prefecture). The aim was to improve agriculture in southern Japan. The authors were the scholars So Senshun, Shirao Kunihashira from the Japanese national Kokugaku school, the Confucian Mukai Tomoaki and Hori Monjuro, who studied Dutch and other Western knowledge in the context of Rangaku. The encyclopedia originally consisted of one hundred richly illustrated volumes. However, because of two major fires, seventy wooden printing blocks were lost, so that in 1804 only thirty parts could be printed. These describe 109 Japanese agricultural crops from 29 plant families around 1800, sometimes with cultivars that no longer exist. The many chapters on farming methods are still current.

A copy of the work was gifted to Philipp Franz von Siebold.

In 2016 research, current crop cultivars were compared to the ones in the Seikei Zusetsu. Matches were found for 50 of the 109 crop species with the other 59 not documented in contemporary databases.

== History ==
The Seikei Zusetsu was commissioned by Shimazu Shigehide, lord of the Satsuma Domain, and compiled by his retainers Sō Senshun and Shirao Kunihashira (白尾国柱). Shigehide also ordered the compilation of many other projects. His goal was to print and distribute the book within his domain, promote agriculture and medicine, and make the rulers aware of the needs of the people.

Originally, the book was intended to be an encyclopedia of 100 volumes, rather than just an agricultural treatise. However, in 1806, the Satsuma domain’s residence in Shiba, Edo, where the encyclopedia was being compiled, caught fire, and although the woodblocks were safe, the project came to a standstill. This, combined with the domain's financial difficulties and political strife, led to the project’s dissolution with only the first 30 volumes completed. Sō Senshun continued the compilation in Edo alone, but in 1829, another fire destroyed the woodblocks and manuscripts of volumes 31 to 40. In 1831, he lamented that the work was still incomplete despite his advanced age. He died three years later.

== Content ==
A total of 30 volumes pertaining to agriculture were published, and multiple editions have survived. Volumes 1 to 14 pertain to agriculture in general, 15 to 20 pertain to grains, and 21 to 30 pertain to vegetables. The same woodblocks were used from the first edition in 1804 until 1868, but it is unknown what happened to them afterwards.

In addition, volumes 31 to 45, which have not been published, have survived in fragments in the form of manuscripts. The manuscripts stored at the Seikadō Bunko contain the contents of the "Fungi Section" (菌部), "Medicinal Herbs Section" (薬草部), "Grass Section" (草部), "Trees Section" (木部), and "Fruit Section" (果部), and the manuscripts stored at the Tokyo National Museum contain the "Birds Section" (鳥部). It is believed that those manuscripts were copied from Sō Senshun’s manuscripts by Shigehide’s retainers for his personal collection, as he had an interest in bird keeping.

The entries are written primarily in Japanese, and in addition to research and explanations based on Japanese and Chinese classics, as well as other works such as Tōga and Shobutsu Ruisan, they also contain many illustrations and comparisons of Japanese, Chinese, and Dutch names.

The illustrations are printed in black and white in general editions, but are printed in color in some special editions. It is presumed that those were presented to the families of powerful feudal lords or the shogunate. Leiden University has a colored copy given to Philipp Franz von Siebold by Katsuragawa Hoken (桂川甫賢).

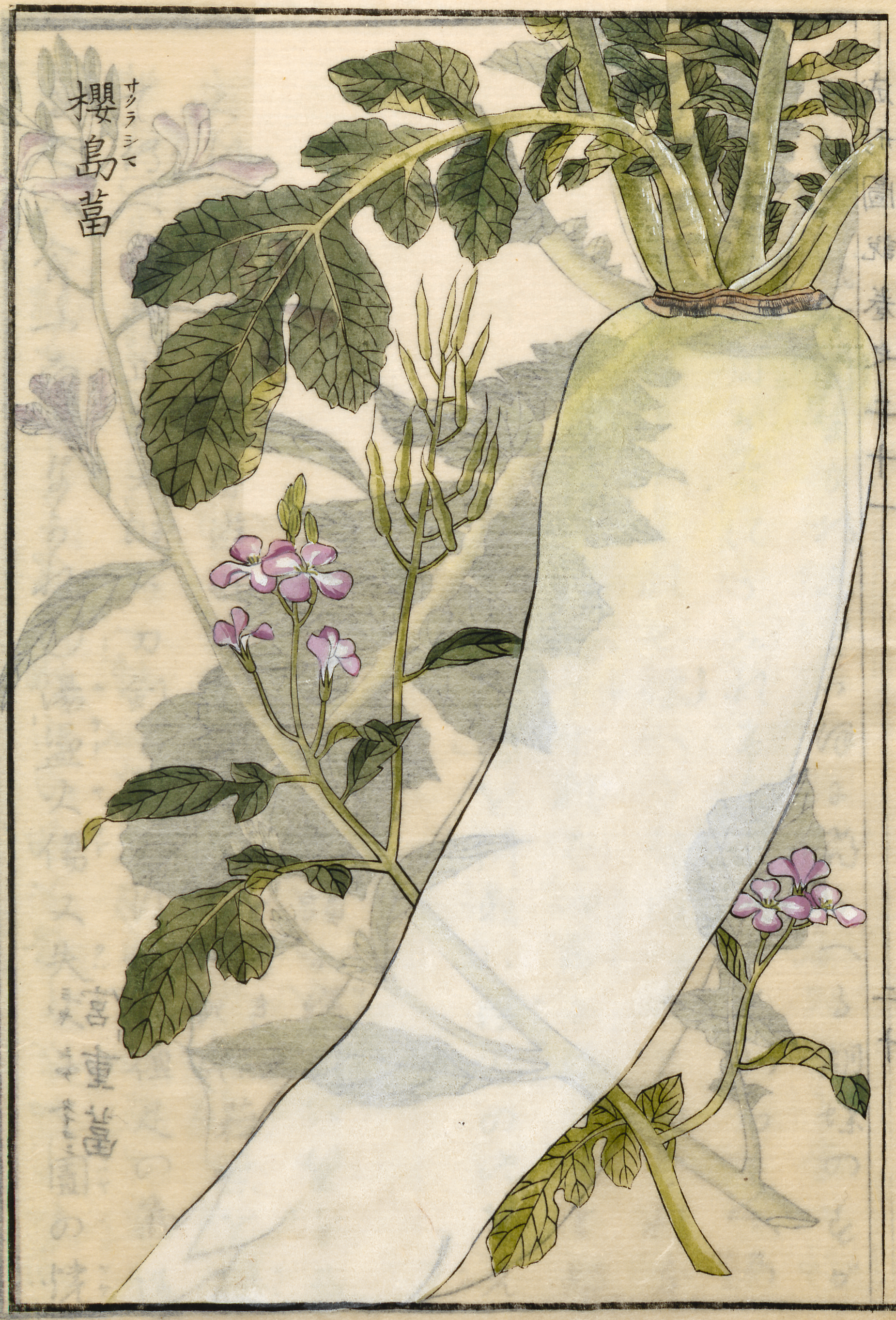
Sakurajima daikon

Volume 2 records the anaichi script, purportedly used during the Age of the Gods.

Volume 21 contains an entry for the Sakurajima daikon, but, for unclear reason, its appearance differs from that of the modern Sakurajima radish.

Volume 21 also contains an entry for the Shinagawa turnip, an Edo-Tokyo vegetable, which contributed to the revival of the variety in Shinagawa in the 2000s.
