= Engaged to the Unidentified =

Japanese manga series

- First tankōbon volume cover, featuring (from left to right) Benio Yonomori, Mashiro Mitsumine and Kobeni Yonomori

未確認で進行形 (Mikakunin de Shinkōkei)
- Genre: Romantic comedy; Supernatural
- Manga
- Written by: Cherry-Arai
- Published by: Ichijinsha
- Magazine: Manga 4-Koma Palette (April 22, 2009 – February 27, 2022); Monthly Comic Rex (April 27, 2022 – March 27, 2024)
- Original run: April 22, 2009 – March 27, 2024
- Volumes: 16
- Anime television series
- Directed by: Yoshiyuki Fujiwara
- Written by: Fumihiko Shimo
- Music by: Jun Ichikawa
- Studio: Doga Kobo
- Licensed by: NA: Sentai Filmworks
- Original network: ABC, AT-X, Tokyo MX, BS11
- Original run: January 8, 2014 – March 26, 2014
- Episodes: 12
- Original video animation
- Directed by: Yoshiyuki Fujiwara
- Written by: Fumihiko Shimo
- Music by: Jun Ichikawa
- Studio: Doga Kobo
- Released: March 19, 2014
- Runtime: 12 minutes
- Original video animation
- Directed by: Yoshiyuki Fujiwara
- Written by: Fumihiko Shimo
- Music by: Jun Ichikawa
- Studio: Doga Kobo
- Released: March 28, 2014
- Runtime: 10 minutes
- icon

Engaged to the Unidentified (Japanese: 未確認で進行形, Hepburn: Mikakunin de Shinkōkei; lit. 'Unconfirmed and In-Progress') is a Japanese four-panel manga series written and illustrated by Cherry-Arai. It was serialized in Ichijinsha's Manga 4-Koma Palette magazine from April 2009 to February 2022, when it was transferred to Monthly Comic Rex upon that magazine ceasing publication, where it ran from April 2022 to March 2024. Its chapters were collected in 16 tankōbon volumes. An anime television series adaptation by Doga Kobo aired between January and March 2014.

== Plot ==
Kobeni Yonomori is a high school girl who lives with her mother and older sister Benio. Upon turning sixteen, Kobeni is shocked to learn that, due to an arrangement by her late grandfather, she is engaged to a boy named Hakuya Mitsumine who, along with his little sister Mashiro, come to live with Kobeni. As Kobeni spends time adjusting to this new family, she learns there is more to Hakuya and Mashiro than meets the eye. Soon, Kobeni's life becomes a bit more interesting between having a fiancé, a new sister-in-law, and a crazy sister.

== Characters ==
Kobeni Yonomori (夜ノ森 小紅, Yonomori Kobeni)
Voiced by: Haruka Terui
A responsible sixteen-year-old who handles cooking and chores well. When she was younger, she fell down a cliff but was saved by Hakuya. The incident left her with a scar and little memory of the event, as she does not remember Hakuya when they meet again. Over time she recalls more of her memories of the incident, later learning she had received half of Hakuya's inhuman power, the side effect of which gives her a fever on occasion. In school she is noted for her cute face, large bust and (as Mashiro puts it) "child-bearing hips" (which she is conscious of). She is also very conscious of the unwanted attention she receives for being the student council president's younger sister. She begins to seriously date Hakuya later on in the series and go out on formal dates, although she is very nervous any time they do.
Benio Yonomori (夜ノ森 紅緒, Yonomori Benio)
Voiced by: Eriko Matsui
Kobeni's older sister, who is the student council president at her school. She is both a siscon and a lolicon, and is incredibly doting on both Kobeni, who has gotten used to it, and Mashiro, who fears her greatly. She is quite popular at school, often putting on a more refined personality than at home. In school, she is called Benio-sama. She is protective of Kobeni as she feels somewhat responsible for what happened.
Mashiro Mitsumine (三峰 真白, Mitsumine Mashiro)
Voiced by: Yu-ri Yoshida
Hakuya's younger sister, who was able to enroll in Kobeni's class despite being nine years old by using a hypnosis-like power to fit into the crowd. She often complains that she is not a child despite being no older than ten, but her true feelings regarding her likes and dislikes can be easily read by the others. She is quite fearful of Benio but is easily swayed by sweet things. She also has a fear of aliens and UMAs but becomes intrigued by the latter when she discovers toy models of them inside some chocolates.
Hakuya Mitsumine (三峰 白夜, Mitsumine Hakuya)
Voiced by: Wataru Hatano
Kobeni's arranged fiancé and Mashiro's older brother. A quiet but kind-hearted boy who silently helps out Kobeni when he can, though is sometimes slow to catch onto things, and is not bothered at all with their arranged marriage, as he truly likes her. When they were younger he saved Kobeni's life after she fell down a cliff and blames himself for failing to prevent it. He injured his right eye in the accident, causing him to lose part of his vision. As a result, he grows his bangs long to cover up the scar. He has a hobby of constructing models of historical buildings from matchsticks, which are often ruined by Mashiro. It is later revealed that he is an Inugami, who gave half of his power to Kobeni to save her life. His usually expressionless face makes him a person hard to read, even to his family. Kobeni, however, seems to be an exception. He begins to seriously date Kobeni later on in the series and go on formal dates out.
Mayura Momouchi (桃内 まゆら, Momouchi Mayura)
Voiced by: Aimi Terakawa
Kobeni's classmate and best friend, whose family runs a big chocolate factory.
Nadeshiko Kashima (鹿島 撫子, Kashima Nadeshiko)
Voiced by: Ayane Sakura
The student council vice-president, who often has to keep Benio's urges in check.
Konoha Suetsugi (末続 このは, Suetsugi Konoha)
Voiced by: Saki Fujita
The student council's secretary, she greatly admires and is fond of Benio just like everyone else at school (with a few exceptions: Mashiro, etc.) and is jealous towards Kobeni and Mashiro because they both live with her. She comes from the same species as Mashiro and Hakuya and seems keen on getting Hakuya to marry her because her mother told her to not miss the chance of claiming a male of their species due to their rarity.
Niko Ōno (大野 仁子, Ōno Niko)
Voiced by: Asuka Kakumoto
Konoha's close friend and a member of the school's newspaper club, who is always on the lookout for a scoop to get herself promoted to the position of editor-in-chief.
Akane Yonomori (夜ノ森 茜, Yonomori Akane)
Voiced by: Yui Watanabe
Kobeni and Benio's mother, who is often busy working.
Shirayuki Mitsumine (三峰 白雪, Mitsumine Shirayuki)
Voiced by: Yuri Komagata
Mashiro and Hakuya's mother, who is petite and looks young for her age. She is easily distracted by sweet things and tends to blurt out important information casually. She is the one who casually lets slip that the Mitsumine clan is not human.
Ui Komagamine (駒ヶ峰 初, Komagamine Ui)
Mashiro and Hakuya's cousin, and Arata's younger sister. Ui has the ability to turn into a cat. And unlike Mashiro, Ui enjoys playing with Benio, even calling her "Benio-tan."
Arata Komagamine (駒ヶ峰 新, Komagamine Arata)
Mashiro and Hakuya's cousin, and Ui's older brother. Arata is a sixth grader. Konoha's mother has arranged an omiai (marriage meeting) between Arata and Konoha.

== Media ==
=== Manga ===
Written and illustrated by Cherry-Arai, Engaged to the Unidentified was published in Ichijinsha's four-panel manga magazine Manga 4-Koma Palette (formerly Manga 4-Koma Kings Palette) from April 22, 2009, to February 27, 2022, when the magazine ceased publication, and the manga was transferred to Monthly Comic Rex starting on April 27 of that same year. The series finished on March 27, 2024. Ichijinsha collected its chapters in 16 tankōbon volumes, released from July 22, 2010, to June 27, 2024. The fourth volume was released simultaneously with a limited edition on December 28, 2013, bundled with a DVD containing an animated music clip of the song Zentaiteki ni Sensation (ぜんたい的にセンセーション), performed by Haruka Terui, Eriko Matsui and Yuri Yoshida.

==== Volumes ====
No.	Japanese release date	Japanese ISBN
1	July 22, 2010	978-4-7580-8088-0
2	October 22, 2011	978-4-7580-8135-1
3	November 22, 2012	978-4-7580-8161-0
4	December 28, 2013	978-4-7580-8194-8; 978-4-7580-8195-5 (LE)
5	March 28, 2014	978-4-7580-8198-6; 978-4-7580-8199-3 (LE)
6	March 20, 2015	978-4-7580-8228-0; 978-4-7580-8229-7 (LE)
7	March 22, 2016	978-4-7580-8260-0; 978-4-7580-8261-7 (LE)
8	May 22, 2017	978-4-7580-8286-0; 978-4-7580-8287-7 (LE)
9	July 21, 2018	978-4-7580-8308-9; 978-4-7580-8309-6 (LE)
10	July 22, 2019	978-4-7580-8323-2; 978-4-7580-8324-9 (LE)
11	July 22, 2020	978-4-7580-8348-5; 978-4-7580-8349-2 (LE)
12	June 22, 2021	978-4-7580-8364-5; 978-4-7580-8365-2 (LE)
13	April 21, 2022	978-4-7580-6971-7; 978-4-7580-6972-4 (LE)
14	February 27, 2023	978-4-7580-8409-3; 978-4-7580-8410-9 (LE)
15	September 27, 2023	978-4-7580-8449-9; 978-4-7580-8450-5 (LE)
16	June 27, 2024	978-4-7580-8545-8; 978-4-7580-8546-5 (LE)

=== Anime ===
An anime television series aired in Japan on ABC channel from January 8 to March 26, 2014. The series was directed by Yoshiyuki Fujiwara at studio Doga Kobo with script by Fumihiko Shimo and character design by Ai Kikuchi, who was also the chief animation director. Besides ABC, the anime also aired on AT-X, Tokyo MX and BS11 and was simulcast with English subtitles by Crunchyroll and through select digital outlets by Sentai Filmworks. The opening and ending themes, "Tomadoi→Recipe" (とまどい→レシピ, Tomadoi Reshipi) and "Masshiro World" (まっしろわーるど, Masshiro Wārudo), respectively, are both performed by Mikakuning! (group formed by voice actresses Eriko Matsui, Haruka Terui, and Yu-ri Yoshida). The series was released in Japan in 6 DVD and Blu-ray Disc volumes between March 19 and August 20, 2014. The first volume contains a 12-minute-long original video animation episode. A 10-minute-long original video animation (OVA) episode was released on March 28, 2014, bundled with the limited edition of the fifth tankōbon volume of the manga.

==== Episodes ====
No.	Title	Original release date
1	"It's Important to Start Off on the Right Foot"; Transliteration: "Nanigoto mo Saisho ga Kanjin desu" (Japanese: 何事も最初が肝心です)	January 9, 2014
Kobeni Yonomori, who has just turned sixteen, is shocked to learn she has a fiancé named Hakuya Mitsumine who, along with his little sister Mashiro, come to live with her and her older sister Benio. As Kobeni struggles to remember just who Hakuya is, Mashiro finds herself at the mercy of the siscon tendencies of Benio. Later, both Hakuya and Mashiro transfer into Kobeni's class, with Mashiro disturbed to find Benio has a completely different personality at school.
2	"It's Not Bad Having a Loli Sister-in-Law"; Transliteration: "Rori Kojūtome tte no mo Warukunai wa" (Japanese: ロリ小姑ってのも悪くないわ)	January 16, 2014
As Mashiro tries to come to grips with Benio's popularity at school, Kobeni continues to try and remember about Hakuya. Later, Mashiro gets spooked at the thought of aliens existing. Meanwhile at school, Mashiro accidentally lets slip to the class that Hakuya is living with Kobeni.
3	"I Can Feel the RomCom Waves"; Transliteration: "Rabukome no Hadō o Kanjiru" (Japanese: ラブコメの波動を感じる)	January 23, 2014
Whilst Benio finally gets Mashiro to come to the student council room for tea, Kobeni goes with Hakuya to buy some ingredients for scones. Curious as to why Hakuya is so thoughtful of her, Kobeni asks Benio why she has not objected to Hakuya becoming Kobeni's fiancé. Benio explains that when Kobeni was younger, Hakuya protected her when she fell down a cliff, leading Kobeni to feel guilty that she could not remember it.
4	"She's Just a Pervert"; Transliteration: "Are wa Tada no Hentai desu" (Japanese: あれはただのへんたいです)	January 30, 2014
The morning after learning about Hakuya, Kobeni ends up with a fever due to her weak body. As Benio informs Mashiro and Hakuya about what she told Kobeni, she blames herself for Kobeni's accident back then, as she had Kobeni take her place alongside Hakuya so she could go and play. The next morning, Kobeni opts to stay at home alone whilst the others go to school, though Mashiro comes back to help her as soon as school ends, where Kobeni shows her the scar she received back then. The next morning, as Kobeni starts feeling a bit better, Hakuya suddenly rushes out of the house when he notices Kobeni struggling to face him properly. Kobeni catches up to him and states that, even though she does not remember anything, she owes him her thanks, becoming awed by his smile. Later that night, Mashiro and Hakuya receive a letter from their family, saying they will be sending someone to check up on them.
5	"This Woman Has Given Birth?"; Transliteration: "Kore ga Keisanpu dato" (Japanese: これが経産婦だと)	February 6, 2014
Kobeni learns about a member of the Mitsumine family coming over, along with the fact that Mashiro is nine years old. Whilst shopping for supplies for her guest, Kobeni comes across a young woman who had gotten lost on her way somewhere and helps her out. This woman turns out to be Mashiro and Hakuya's mother, Shirayuki, who casually lets slip that their family is not human. This causes Kobeni to have another fever as she remembers more things about her past, where Hakuya was allegedly a dog. Shirayuki later tells Kobeni that her constant fevers are the result of Hakuya giving her half of his inhuman power to save her life. Before taking her leave, Shirayuki gives Kobeni her thanks for treating Hakuya well, mentioning how he picked up his habit of stroking her head from her.
6	"I Know! I'll Fill It with a Sister-in-law"; Transliteration: "Sō da, Kojūto de Umeyō" (Japanese: そうだ、小姑でうめよう)	February 13, 2014
Kobeni's mother, Akane, who had always known the Mitsumines were not human, tells Kobeni that she is no less thankful to them for saving her life. The next morning, Kobeni tries to learn more from Hakuya and Mashiro about their other forms, though Hakuya refuses to transform in front of her. As Kobeni turns her attention towards Valentine's Day, she ponders whether she should marry Hakuya or not. On Valentine's Day, Kobeni tries to work up the courage to give Hakuya some chocolate, but has trouble finding the chance. She finally gets the opportunity after her friend, Mayura Momouchi, comes over.
7	"That's One Thing, This is Another"; Transliteration: "Sore wa Sore, Kore wa Kore" (Japanese: それはそれ、これはこれ)	February 20, 2014
Student Council secretary Konoha Suetsugi feels some hostility towards Kobeni and Mashiro because of their closeness to Benio. Newspaper Club member Niko Ōno offers to help get some dirt on them, though her overenthusiasm proves too much for Konoha to keep under control. Konoha becomes more paranoid as Kobeni keeps walking in on her private outbursts. After having a brief argument with her over Benio, Mashiro suspects that Konoha is part of the same species as they are, with Konoha coming to realise the same thing.
8	"Only a Little Sister Can Soothe Sadness Over a Little Sister"; Transliteration: "Imōto no Kanashimi o Iyasu no wa, Imōto" (Japanese: 妹の悲しみをいやすのは、妹)	February 27, 2014
As Kobeni decides to keep Konoha's true identity a secret from Benio, Niko continues to investigate her, despite warnings from Hakuya. Later, Mashiro and Konoha find some time alone to confirm they are from the same species, with Konoha assuming they were trying to get close to Benio. After Mashiro and Hakuya confirm this is not the case, Konoha tells Hakuya that, as a male of the same species, he should marry her, which Kobeni overhears.
9	"How Humiliating, I'm So Embarrassed"; Transliteration: "Kutsujoku desu, Hazukashime o Ukemashita" (Japanese: くつじょくです、はずかしめをうけました)	March 6, 2014
As Mashiro informs Konoha about Kobeni and Hakuya's engagement, Hakuya chases after Kobeni, assuring her that he is already engaged to her. When Niko overhears this and asks if they are dating, Hakuya denies it as he wanted to respect Kobeni's wishes about keeping the engagement a secret. Hearing about this from Niko, Konoha believes she is still in with a chance. As Kobeni asks Konoha to keep her engagement a secret, Konoha suggests that if she is against it, she should just break it off. Kobeni cries upon hearing this, and the conversation is soon interrupted by Benio. Later that night, Kobeni assures Hakuya that she is not against their engagement, which Mashiro interprets as a love confession, encouraging Hakuya to get Kobeni something spectacular for White Day.
10	"I Looked Up the Term "Lovey-Dovey Phase""; Transliteration: "Dere-ki to Iu Tango o Shirabetara" (Japanese: デレ期という単語を調べたら)	March 13, 2014
Benio seems to grow colder towards Hakuya, who seems a bit downhearted when Kobeni denies confessing. Meanwhile, Kobeni clears up the misunderstandings surrounding the engagement with Konoha, who attempts to stave off Niko's interest in Kobeni by giving her a plain article to write about. Later, Mashiro explains to Kobeni that Konoha's interest in marrying Hakuya was only because they are the same species, revealing that Kobeni is also similar to them due to having half of Hakuya's power. The next day, Kobeni decides to buy her and Hakuya matching handkerchieves, also buying some for Benio and Mashiro.
11	"Enjoying the Handkerchief"; Transliteration: "Hankachi o Tanoshinderu no yo" (Japanese: ハンカチを楽しんでるのよ)	March 20, 2014
Hakuya is troubled over what gift he should get for Kobeni to make up for White Day. Meanwhile, Mashiro is almost spotted using her powers by Niko, who becomes determined to investigate the existence of a 'flying humanoid'. Later, Mashiro suggests that Kobeni and Hakuya go on a date, though Kobeni turns it into an outing with Mashiro. On the way home, Kobeni discovers Hakuya has a scar over his right eye, quickly coming to the conclusion that he got it from saving her. The next morning, after Hakuya and Mashiro receive another letter from their clan, Kobeni discovers they have disappeared, along with their belongings.
12	"Do You Understand? I Understand"; Transliteration: "Wakatteru? Wakatteru" (Japanese: わかってる? わかってる)	March 27, 2014
As Kobeni worries about Hakuya and Mashiro, the only clue she has being a text saying they had gone back to the mountains, Mayura encourages her to go to the mountains herself to learn the true story. Taking refuge from the snow, Kobeni is eventually found by Hakuya and Mashiro, who had only returned home to harvest some edible plants that only grow on their mountain. Kobeni comes down with another fever as a snowstorm picks up, with Hakuya heading off to look for help whilst Mashiro uses an opportunity to look for firewood. Delirious from her fever and worried about people leaving her, Kobeni heads off on her own in search for them, with Hakuya managing to save her from falling off a cliff. After Hakuya agrees to be more open with Kobeni, everyone returns home to their everyday lives.

===== OVAs =====
No.	Title	Original release date
OVA–1	"Look. That's the Hot Spring Inn We Stayed At."; Transliteration: "Mite. Are ga Watashi-tachi no Tomatteiru Ryokan yo." (Japanese: 見て。あれが私たちの泊まっている旅館よ。)	March 19, 2014
Kobeni and the others win a trip to a hot spring inn.
OVA–2	"Duck Meat Tastes a Bit Like Green to Me."; Transliteration: "Kamo Nikutte Midori-ppoi Aji ga suru no ne." (Japanese: 鴨肉って緑っぽい味がするのね。)	March 28, 2014
Kobeni recalls her childhood with Benio and Nadeshiko, whilst Mashiro tells her about her time in the mountains with Hakuya.

== See also ==
- Three Leaves, Three Colors, another manga series by Cherry Arai

== Works cited ==
- "Ch." is shortened form for chapter and refers to a chapter number of the Engaged to the Unidentified manga
- "Ep." is shortened form for episode and refers to an episode number of the Engaged to the Unidentified anime
