= Sakurajima =

Stratovolcano in Kagoshima Prefecture, Japan

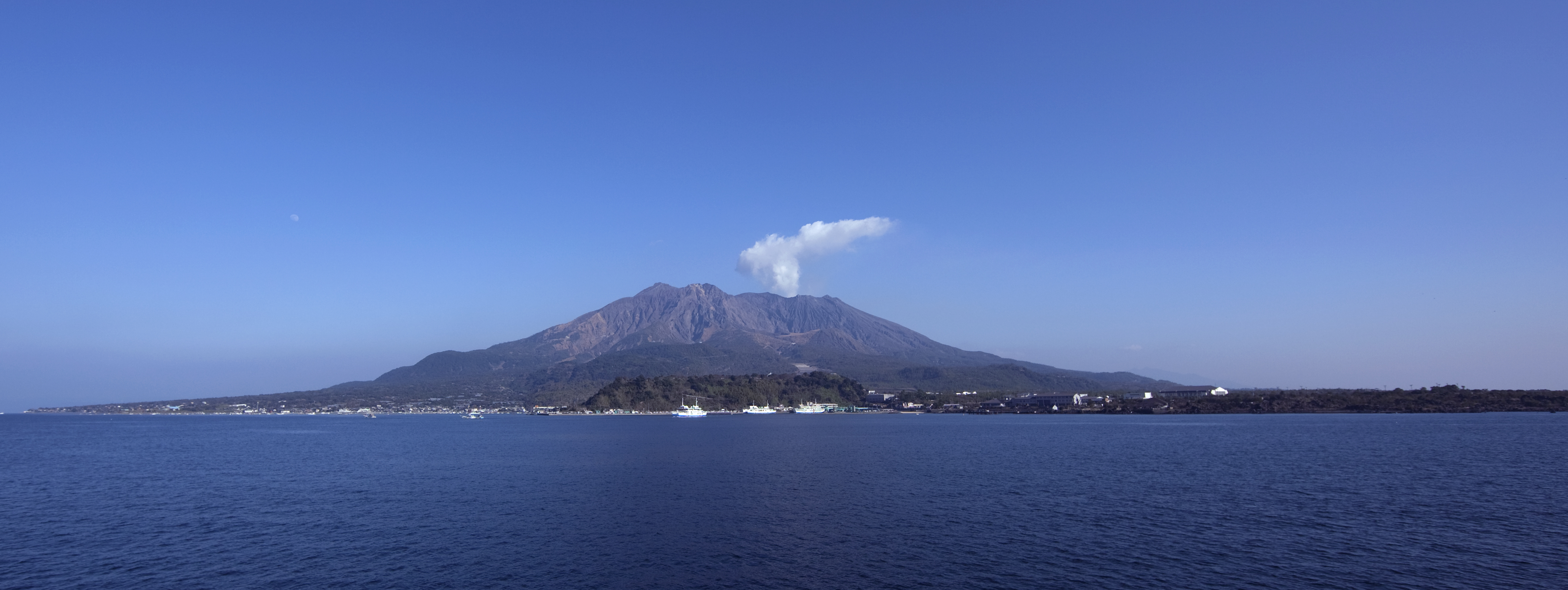
- View of Sakurajima from mainland Kagoshima, 2009

Highest point
- Elevation: 1,117 m (3,665 ft)
- Coordinates: 31°34′50″N 130°39′29″E

Geography
- Location within Japan Location within Kagoshima Prefecture
- Location: Kagoshima Prefecture, Japan

Geology
- Mountain type: Somma-stratovolcano
- Last eruption: 8 May 2026

Sakurajima (Japanese: 桜島, lit. 'Cherry Blossom Island') is an active stratovolcano, formerly an island and now a peninsula, in Kagoshima Prefecture in Kyushu, Japan. It is the most active volcano in Japan.

As of November 2025, the volcanic activity continues, dropping volcanic ash on the surroundings. Earlier eruptions built the white sand highlands in the region. On 13 September 2016, a team of experts from Bristol University and the Sakurajima Volcano Research Centre in Japan suggested that the volcano could have a major eruption within 30 years; since then many eruptions have occurred.

Sakurajima has a population of a few thousand residents, formerly incorporated as Sakurajima town, with a number of schools, shrines, and shops on the island. It is serviced by the Sakurajima Ferry. It is a tourist destination known for its onsen, local pottery made from volcanic ash, and produce such as the Sakurajima daikon radish and Sakurajima komikan orange which grow in the immensely fertile volcanic soil.

Sakurajima has many different natural areas due to its eruptive history and the ecosystems where recent eruptions have taken place have been researched as an example of ecological succession.

== Geography ==
Sakurajima is a stratovolcano. Its summit has three peaks, Kita-dake (northern peak), Naka-dake (central peak) and Minami-dake (southern peak) which has been recently active.

Kita-dake is Sakurajima's highest peak, rising to 1,117 m (3,665 ft) above sea level. The mountain is in a part of Kagoshima Bay known as Kinkō-wan. The lava flows of the 1914 eruption connected it with the Ōsumi Peninsula. The former island is part of the city of Kagoshima which is only 4 km (2.5 mi) across the bay. The surface of this volcanic peninsula is about 77 km^{2} (30 sq mi).

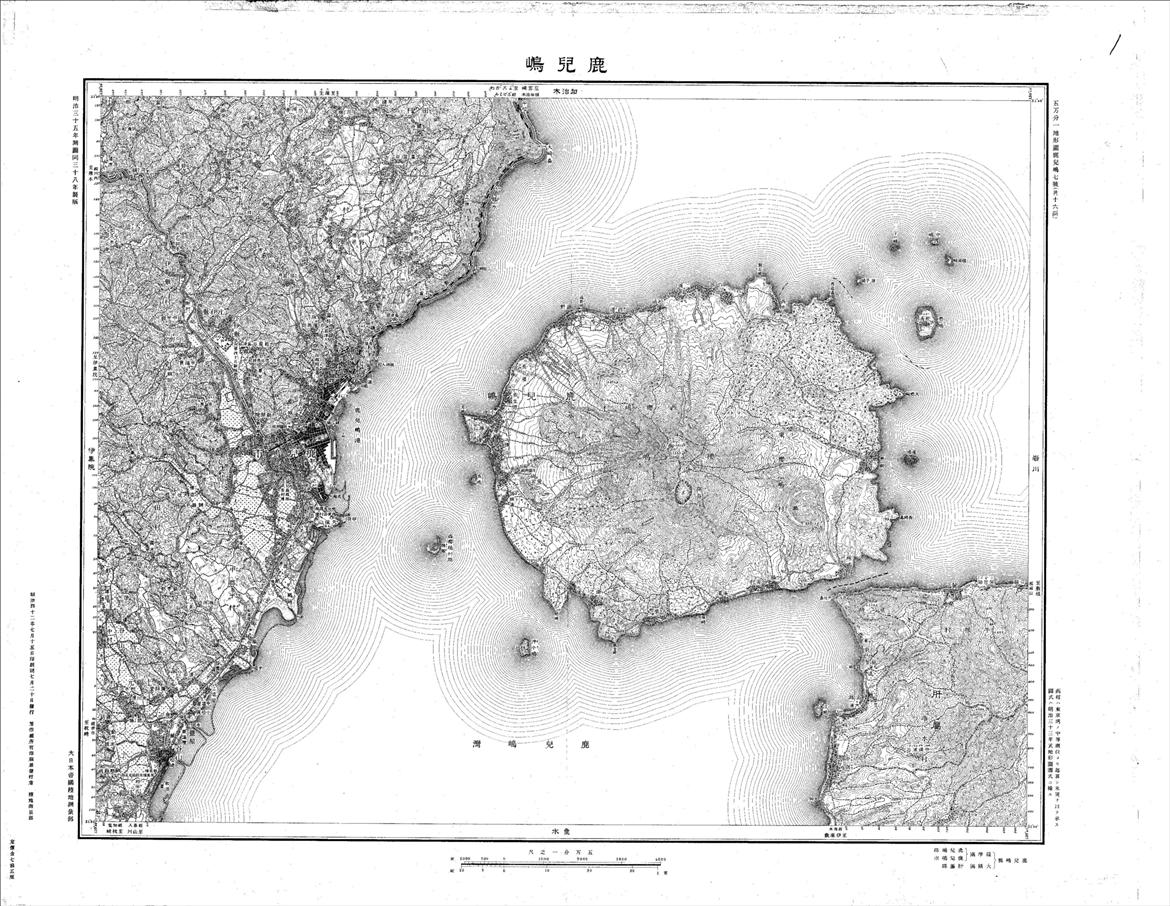
A map of Sakurajima in 1902, showing it as a distinct island.

Sakurajima is part of the Kirishima-Kinkowan National Park, and its lava flows are a major tourist attraction. The area around Sakurajima contains several hot spring resorts. One of the main agricultural products of Sakurajima is a huge basketball-sized white radish (Sakurajima daikon).

== Geology ==
Sakurajima is in the 25 km (16 mi)-wide Aira caldera, which formed in an enormous "blow-out-and-cave-in" eruption around 28,000 years ago. Several hundred cubic kilometres of ash and pumice were ejected, causing the magma chamber underneath the erupting vents to collapse. Tephra fell as far as 1,000 km (620 mi) from the volcano. Sakurajima is an active vent of the same Aira caldera volcano.

Sakurajima was initially formed about 3000 years later and has had 17 large-scale pumice eruptions since. It is about 8 km (5 mi) south of the centre of the caldera, on its rim. Most of the lavas and tephra erupted have an andesitic-dacitic composition but there are some rhyolite composition eruptives.

Volcanic activity at Kita-dake ended around 4,900 years ago: later eruptions. have been centered on Minami-dake. Initially since 2006, activity was centred on Showa crater, to the east of the summit of Minami-dake, but by 2025 had moved to the summit crater.

== History ==
=== Prehistoric eruptions ===
After the volcano formed about 26,000 years ago BP, until recorded history times only the largest eruptions can be identified. Pumice layers P4 to P17 include the P14 vary thick layer from a VEI 6 eruption over 10,000 years ago.

=== Historic eruptions ===
Its first eruption in recorded history was in 963 AD. Most of its eruptions are Strombolian, affecting only the summit areas, but larger Plinian eruptions have occurred in 1471–1476, 1779–1782 and 1914.

==== 1914 eruption ====
1914 Sakurajima eruption
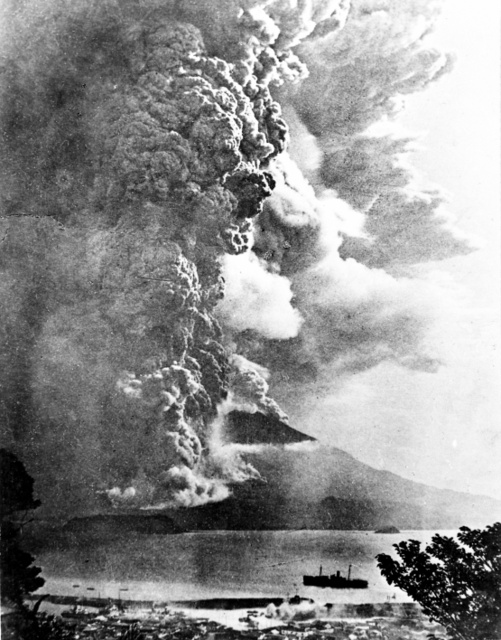
- Sakurajima erupting in 1914
- Start date: 11 January 1914
- Type: Peléan
- VEI: 4
- Impact: Pre-eruption earthquakes killed 35 people and the eruption killed 23 people; caused an evacuation and significant changes to the local topography.

The 1914 eruption (also known as Sakura-Jima eruption or Taisho eruption) began on 11 January and was the most powerful in twentieth-century Japan. The volcano had been dormant for over a century until 1914. Almost all residents had left the island in the previous days; several large earthquakes had warned them that an eruption was imminent.

Initially, the eruption was very explosive, generating eruption columns and pyroclastic flows, but after a very large earthquake on 12 January, and another the day after, it became effusive, generating a large lava flow. Ash fall occurred as far as the north of Honshu. The 12 January earthquake killed 35, and in total, 58 people died. Lava flows filled the narrow strait between the island and the mainland, turning it into a peninsula. It transpired that about 90% of the total magma volume in dense-rock equivalent was lava.

Lava flows are rare in Japan—because the silica content of the magmas is high, explosive eruptions are far more common—but the lava flows at Sakurajima continued for months. The island grew, engulfing several smaller islands nearby, and eventually became connected to the mainland by a narrow isthmus. Parts of Kagoshima Bay became significantly shallower, and it made tides higher.

During the last stages of the eruption, emptying of the underlying magma chamber sank the centre of the Aira Caldera by about 60 cm (24 in). This showed that Sakurajima draws its magma from the same magma reservoir that fed the ancient caldera-forming eruption. The eruption partly inspired a 1914 movie, The Wrath of the Gods, centering on a family curse that ostensibly causes the eruption.

==== Recent activity ====
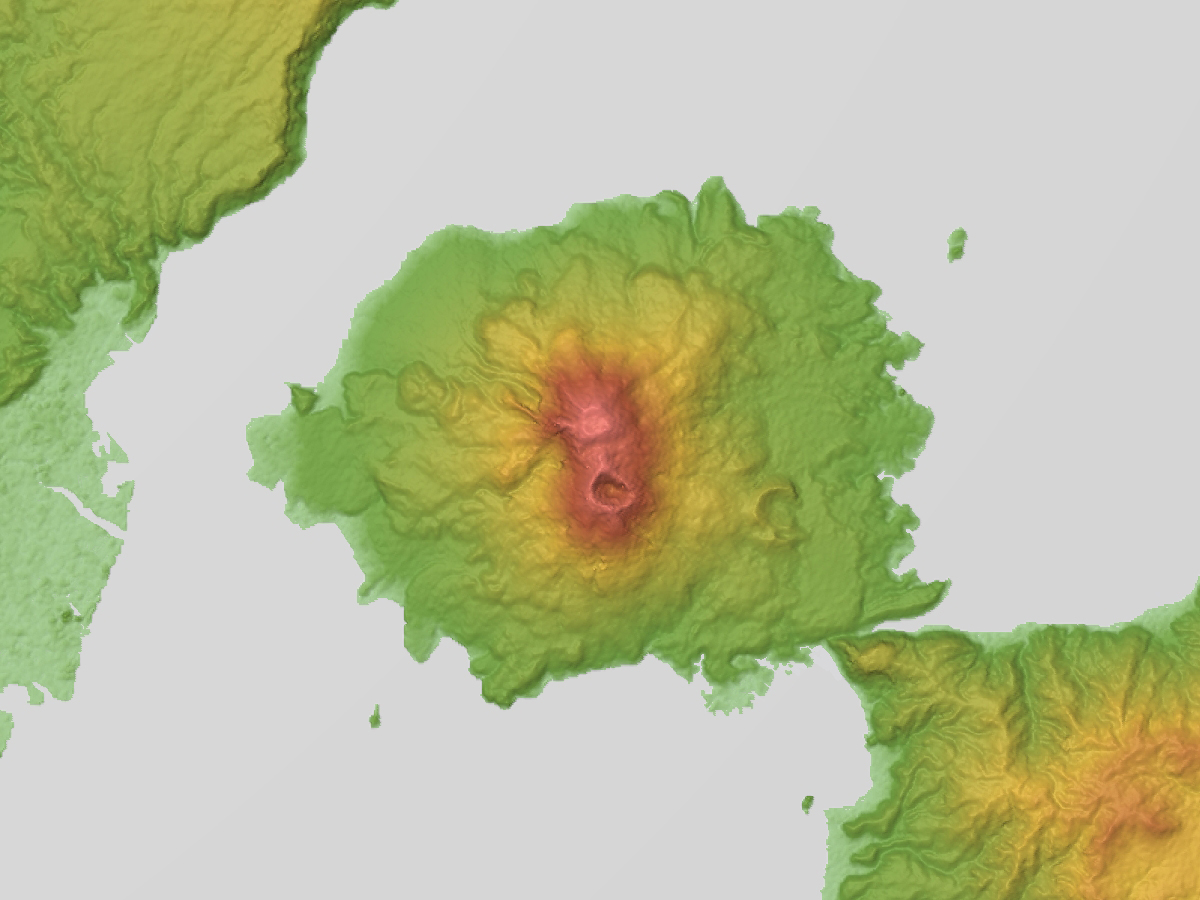
Topographic map of Sakurajima and its surroundings

Sakurajima's activity became more prominent in 1955, and the volcano has been erupting almost constantly ever since. Thousands of small explosions happen each year, throwing ash to heights of up to a few kilometers above the mountain. The Sakurajima Volcano Observatory was set up in 1960 to monitor these eruptions. Between 1955 and 2024, 15,057 eruptions from the Minamidake and the Showa craters were observed.

Monitoring of the volcano and predictions of large eruptions are particularly important because it is in a densely populated area, with the city of Kagoshima's 680,000 residents just a few kilometers from the volcano. The city conducts regular evacuation drills, and a number of shelters have been built where people can take refuge from falling volcanic debris.

In light of the dangers it presents to nearby populations, Sakurajima was designated a Decade Volcano in 1991, identifying it as worthy of particular study as part of the United Nations' International Decade for Natural Disaster Reduction.

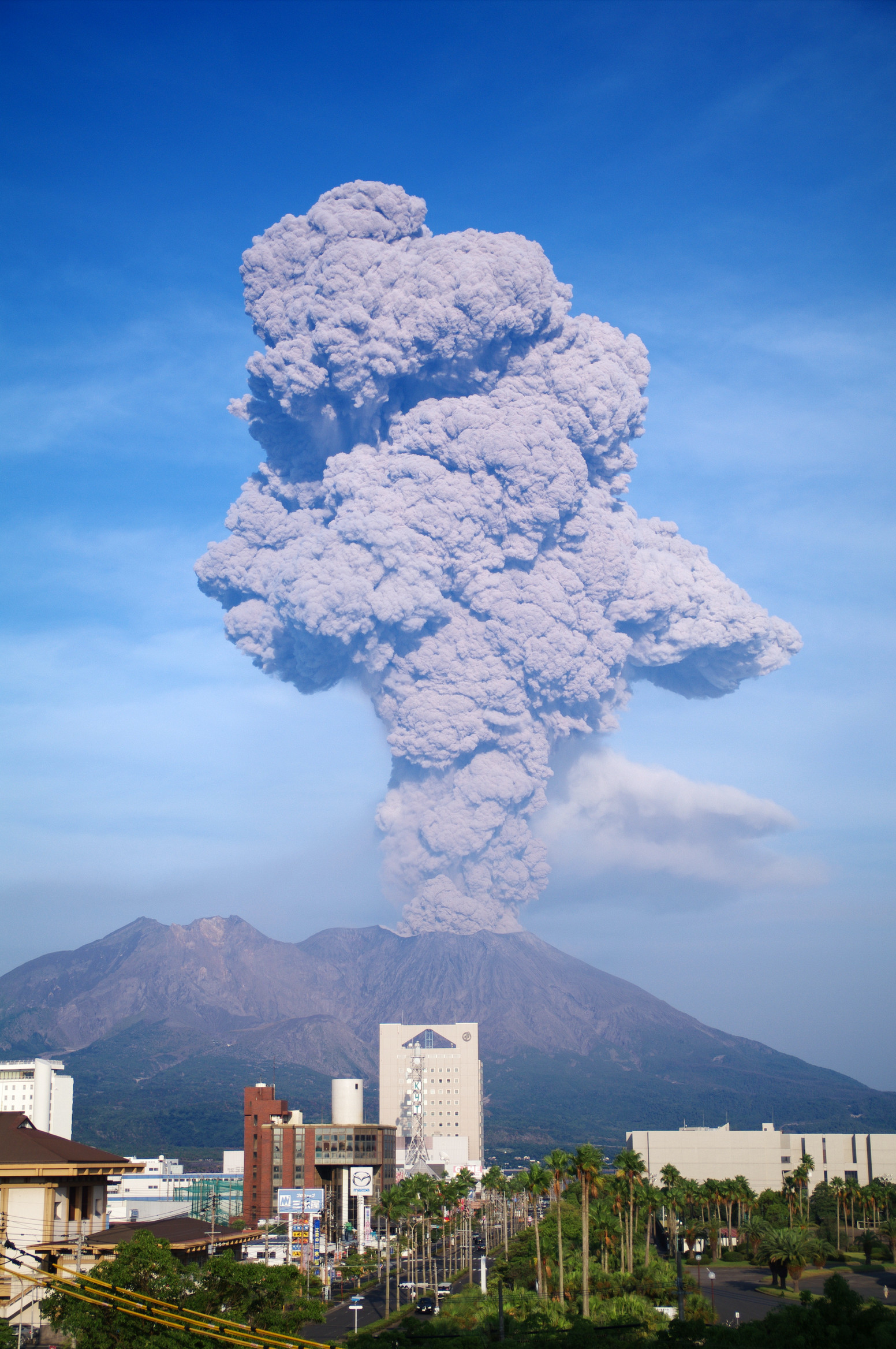
Sakurajima erupting on 10 March 2009

On 10 March 2009, Sakurajima erupted, sending debris up to 2 km (1.2 mi). An eruption had been expected following a series of smaller explosions over the weekend. It is not thought there was any damage caused. An eruption occurred from the Minami-dake summit crater at 5:38 on Sunday, 9 August 2010, sending debris up to 5000 m (16,000 ft). In 2011 and 2012, Sakurajima experienced several significant eruptions; volcanic activity continued into 2013. On 18 August 2013, the volcano erupted from Showa crater and produced its highest recorded plume of ash since 2006, rising 5,000 metres high and causing darkness and significant ash falls on the central part of Kagoshima city. The eruption occurred at 16:31 and was the 500th eruption of the year. In August 2015, Japan's meteorological agency issued a level 4 emergency warning, which urges residents to prepare to evacuate.

Scientists warned that a major eruption could soon take place at the volcano; it eventually did erupt around 20:00 on 5 February 2016. After a long pause of eruptions at the vent, the eruptions abruptly stopped there and returned to the Showa crater, on 4 April 2016, some 8–9 days preceding major earthquakes on the Median Tectonic Line near Kumamoto, Japan. Then, three months later, on 26 July, it spewed volcanic ash 5,000 m (16,000 ft) into the air.

On 3 October 2020, at 07:35 UTC, the volcano erupted once again, this time from the Aira caldera. A volcanic ash advisory for aviation was issued by the Volcanic Ash Advisory Center Tokyo (VAAC) at 07:43 UTC, showing the ash cloud to be stationary and reaching FL100 (10,000 feet). On 24 July 2022, at 20:05 JST, an explosive eruption occurred at the summit crater of the volcano, and cinders scattered up to 2.5 km (1.6 mi) from the crater. Following this eruption, at 20:50 JST, the Japan Meteorological Agency raised the eruption alert level from Level 3 to Level 5, the highest level, and urged maximum precaution and evacuation. This was the first time an eruption alert level 5 has been issued for Sakurajima.

On 9 February 2023, an eruption occurred at the Showa crater on Sakurajima at 10:52 JST. The plumes had risen to 1,000 metres (3,300 feet) at 11:10 JST, according to the Kagoshima Meteorological Office. People in a 2 km (1.2 mi) radius were sent a warning by the local weather observatory against pyroclastic flows and falling rocks. On 14 February 2024, an eruption occurred at the southern peak's Minamidake crater on Sakurajima at 18:33 JST, emitting plumes of over 5 kilometres (3.1 miles) in height and spewing rocks as far as 1.3 km (0.81 mi) away. Minamidake crater again erupted on 18 October 2024, with a plume above 4 km (2.5 mi). Between 15 and 16 May 2025, multiple small eruptions with volcanic plumes up to 3 km (1.9 mi) high occurred disturbing local air travel. On 16 November 2025, Minamidake crater erupted at 00:57 JST with an eruption plume that reached 4,400 m (14,400 ft) high. Volcanic rocks from the eruption reached as far as the fifth station, some 1.2 km (0.75 mi) from the crater and a level 3 alert was issued. On 11 April 2026, another eruption occurred at the Minamidake crater at 12:04 JST. The plume reached a height of 3,400 m (11,200 ft) with large volcanic rocks reaching the volcano's 7th station ejected. Alert level 3 remains in effect. On 8 May 2026, Minamidake crater erupted creating a 3,500-metre (11,500 ft) high eruption column.

==== Summary of eruptive history ====
Summary of known eruptions
Start Date	Years before 1950 (BP)	VEI	Lava volume (km^{3})	Tephra volume (km^{3})	Comment
25 March 2017	–	3	–	–	Explosive with effusive eruption continuing. Minamidake crater M3 phase.
13 October 1955	–	3	–	–	Explosive with effusive eruption continuing until 22 August 2016. Contains Minamidake crater M1 phase until 1971 and M2 phase from 1972, and from 2006 to 2017 eruptions at Showa crater.
16 November 1954 ± 15	–	–	–	–	Uncertain details 16 December 1954± 15.
29 June 1950	0	1	–	–	Explosive with effusive eruption continuing until 9 September 1950.
27 July 1948	2	1	–	–	Explosive with effusive eruption on single day.
January 1946	4	2	0.18	–	Eruption ended November 1946.
1 July 1942	8	1	–	–	Explosive with effusive eruption on single day.
April 1941	9	2	–	–	Explosive with effusive eruption ended 26 August 1941
24 April 1940	10	2	–	–	Explosive with effusive eruption ended 9 July 1940.
26 November 1939	11	2	–	–	Explosive with effusive eruption ended about 12 November 1939.
25 February 1938	12	2	–	–	Explosive with effusive eruption ended 31 March 1938.
20 September 1935	15	1	–	–	Explosive with effusive eruption ended 24 September 1935.
12 January 1914	36	4	1.34	0.5	Explosive (P1 tephra) with effusive eruption of Taisho lava ended in May 1915.
24 September 1899	51	–	–	–	Uncertain details, ended 25 September 1899.
1860	90	1	–	–	Explosive with effusive eruption.
27 March 1799	151	2	–	–	Explosive with effusive eruption.
1797	153	2	–	–	Explosive with effusive eruption.
1794	156	2	–	–	Explosive with effusive eruption
11 September 1791	159	2	–	–	Explosive with effusive eruption.
29 July 1790	160	2	–	–	Explosive with effusive eruption.
20 November 1785	165	2	–	–	Explosive with effusive eruption.
3 September 1783	167	3			Explosive with effusive eruption continuing until 22 August 2016.
18 January 1782	168	2	–	–	Explosive with effusive eruption may have VEI less than 2.
8 November 1779	171	4	1.7	0.22	Explosive (P2 tephra) with effusive eruption of An-ei lava ended in May 1781.
9 September 1756	194	2	–	–	Explosive with effusive eruption.
September 1749	201	2	–	–	Explosive with effusive eruption.
6 April 1742	208	2	–	–	Explosive with effusive eruption possibly less than VEI 2.
January 1706	244	2	–	–	Explosive with effusive eruption possibly less than VEI 2.
1 March 1678	272	2	–	–	Explosive with effusive eruption possibly less than VEI 2.
6 April 1642	308	2	–	–	Explosive with effusive eruption possibly less than VEI 2.
23 September 1478	472	2	–	–	Explosive with effusive eruption possibly less than VEI 2.
3 November 1471	479	5	0.53	0.49	Explosive (P3 tephra) with effusive eruption of Bunmei lava possibly less than VEI 5 ending on or after 8 October 1476.
1468	482	2	–	–	Explosive with effusive eruption.
778	1172	0	–	–	Explosive with effusive eruption.
20 July 766	1184	3			Explosive with effusive eruption.
January 764	1186	4	–	–	Explosive with effusive eruption. First recorded large–scale historical eruption.
716	1234	3			Explosive with effusive eruption continued until 718.
708	1242	3			Explosive with effusive eruption.
650 BCE	2600	–	–	–	Explosive with effusive eruption.
1050 BCE	3000	–	–	–	Explosive with effusive eruption.
2050 BCE	4000	–	–	–	Explosive with effusive eruption
2900 BCE	4850	4	–	0.18	Explosive (P5 tephra) with effusive eruption.
3500 BCE	5450	–	–	–	Explosive with effusive eruption.
4800 BCE	6750	–	–	–	Explosive with effusive eruption, Minami-dak activity.
5400 BCE	7350	–	–	–	Explosive with effusive eruption.
5950 BCE	7900	–	–	–	Explosive with effusive eruption.
6050 BCE	8000	5	–	–	Explosive with effusive eruption.
6350 BCE	8300	–	–	–	Explosive (P11 tephra) with effusive eruption of Gongenyam lava.
7750 BCE	9700	–	–	–	Explosive (P12 tephra) with effusive eruption of Harutayama lava
8050 ± 1000 BCE	10000	6	–	–	P13 tephra and Kitadake lava (Warishizaki lava)

=== Eruptive risk ===
A monitoring system with formalised warnings since 2007 is in place, and evacuation drills have been held in the Sakurajima immediate area since 1970. Since 2024 a predictive model based on local ground inflation has been in place at the local volcanic observatory that may give short term warning of eruption and ash fall distribution from contemporary minor eruptions. An impact assessment of a eruption of the scale of the 1914 eruption predicts the disruption with damage multiple critical infrastructure features, including airports, roads, power networks, and buildings up to a Japanese national level. The volcano is predicted to accumulate sufficient magma in 130 years to allow a repeat of this scale eruption. The ash fall thickness of such an eruption would have about a 5% probability of temporarily closing the six largest airports in Japan and above a 80% probability of closing the major Kyushu airports of Miyazaki and Kagoshima. Road and rail transport disruption would be limited to Kyushu and electricity supply disruption to souther Kyushu. The combination of an eruption and a high rainfall weather event would be particularity problematical due to electrical arc flash events. The ash fall would be most disruptive to local property and people if an eruption occurred in winter or during a has the local ash fall is likely to be heavier then.

== In popular culture ==
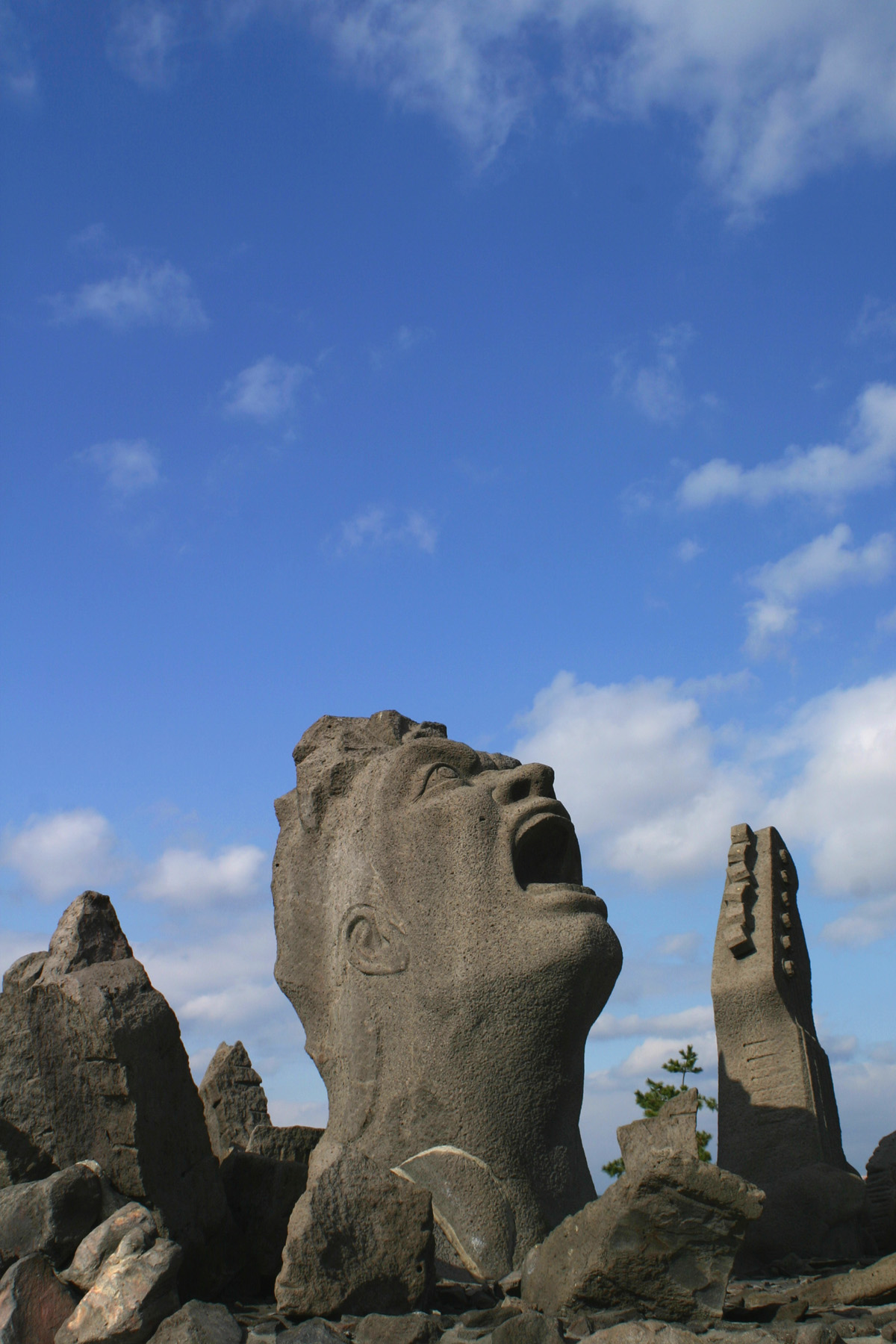
Sculpture of Nagabuchi at the site of the All Night Concert on Sakurajima.

Sakurajima is a novella written in 1946 by the Japanese writer Haruo Umezaki, about a disillusioned Navy officer stationed on the island towards the end of World War II as American planes bomb Japan. The story is one of Umezaki's most famous works. It is based on his own experience; during World War II, he was stationed at a military cipher base in the nearby city of Kagoshima.

"Sakurajima" is also the name of a song by Japanese singer Tsuyoshi Nagabuchi. In 2004, Nagabuchi held an all night concert at a quarry of Sakurajima that attracted an audience of 75,000. Afterwards, a statue showing Nagabuchi screaming with a guitar was installed on the site of the concert.

== See also ==
- List of volcanoes in Japan
- Flag of Kagoshima Prefecture, which features Sakurajima
