= Divine Gate =

Japanese mobile game and anime series

- Divine Gate key visual

ディバインゲート (Dibain Gēto)
- Genre: Action
- Video game
- Developer: GungHo, Acquire
- Publisher: GungHo Online Entertainment
- Genre: Action; Trading card game
- Platform: iOS, Android
- Released: JP: September 30, 2013 (Android)
- Anime television series
- Directed by: Noriyuki Abe
- Produced by: Ryōsuke Hagiwara; Takumi Kohama; Motohiro Oda; Shūichi Fujimura; Masatoshi Hako
- Written by: Natsuko Takahashi
- Music by: Takumi Ozawa
- Studio: Pierrot
- Licensed by: Crunchyroll
- Original network: Tokyo MX, KBS, Sun TV, TVQ, TSC, TV Aichi, BS11, AT-X
- Original run: January 8, 2016 – March 25, 2016
- Episodes: 12

Divine Gate (ディバインゲート, Dibain Gēto) was a 2013 Japanese mobile game developed by Acquire for iOS and Android devices. The game was relaunched as Divine Gate Zero (ディバインゲート零) in September 2017, and its service ended on December 11, 2018. An anime television series adaptation by Pierrot aired from January 8, 2016, to March 25, 2016.

== Plot ==
The living, heavens, and underworld become connected after a Divine Gate is opened, ushering in an era of chaos where desires and conflict intersect. Only when the World Council is formed are peace and order restored and the Divine Gate becomes an urban legend. In that world, boys and girls deemed fit by the World Council are gathered, who aim to reach the gate for their personal objectives. Those who reach the gate can remake the world and even the past or future.

== Characters ==
Akane (アカネ, Akane)
Voiced by: Tetsuya Kakihara (Japanese); Joel McDonald (English)
A fire user. After the train incident, he is one of the adapters who tries to persuade Aoto into joining the academy. He was proud of and cared a lot about his father who is said to have died in an accident during one of his experiments and as a result, hates it when Aoto proclaims that he killed his parents. He does not believe his father died in an accident as he was not the type to make mistakes in his experiments.
Aoto (アオト, Aoto)
Voiced by: Sōma Saitō (Japanese); Chris Burnett (English)
A water user. Thought to be his parents' killer, he secludes himself and makes no friends. After saving a girl from a fire user in a train, Arthur and the other adapters try to recruit him into the academy numerous times since he doesn't fit in at his current school and because of his abilities but he refuses. He later joins the academy.
Midori (ミドリ, Midori)
Voiced by: Kanae Itō (Japanese); Alexis Tipton (English)
An air user and Akane's best friend. After the train incident, she is one of the adapters who try to persuade Aoto into joining the academy. Midori and Elena were friends in their childhood.
Hikari (ヒカリ, Hikari)
Voiced by: Ayana Taketatsu (Japanese); Lindsay Seidel (English)
Yukari (ユカリ, Yukari)
Voiced by: Sora Amamiya (Japanese); Apphia Yu (English)
Ginji (ギンジ, Ginji)
Voiced by: Hiroyuki Yoshino (Japanese); Jarrod Greene (English)
Arthur (アーサー, Āsā)
Voiced by: Yuichi Nakamura (Japanese); J. Michael Tatum (English)
Chairman of the academy. Has an extreme interest in Aoto and his friends. Tries multiple times to recruit Aoto.
Boy K (少年K, Shōnen K)
Voiced by: Rie Kugimiya (Japanese); Mikaela Krantz (English)
The Key Spirit of the Divine Gate. Boy K has been following Aoto since childhood and appears frequently in front of him. Aoto is the only one who is able to see him, because he is the only character who is able to open the Divine Gate but refuses to do so.
Ifrit (イフリート, Ifurīto)
Voiced by: Ami Koshimizu (Japanese); Rachel Robinson (English)
A fire spirit who is a teacher at the Academy.
Undine (ウンディーネ, Undīne)
Voiced by: Mai Fuchigami (Japanese); Sarah Wiedenheft (English)
A water spirit who is a teacher at the Academy. In charge of recruiting Aoto into the academy by Arthur's order.
Sylph (シルフ, Shirufu)
Voiced by: Kana Asumi (Japanese); Natalie Hoover (English)
A wind spirit who is a teacher at the Academy.
Metabon (めたぼん, Metabon)
Voiced by: Yu-ri Yoshida (Japanese); Monica Rial (English)
Lancelot (ランスロット, Ransurotto)
Voiced by: Kōsuke Toriumi (Japanese); Ricco Fajardo (English)
Oz (オズ, Ozu)
Voiced by: Akira Ishida (Japanese); Austin Tindle (English)
A wizard Arthur invited to watch him reach the gate and change the world.
Loki (ロキ, Roki)
Voiced by: Kōji Yusa (Japanese); Chuck Huber (English)
A mischievous god with hidden agendas.
Ywain (ユーウェイン, Yūwein)
Voiced by: Kenn (Japanese); Ian Sinclair (English)
Bedivere (ベディヴィア, Bedivia)
Voiced by: Azusa Tadokoro (Japanese); Megan Shipman (English)
Breunor (ブルーノ, Burūno)
Voiced by: Ayumu Murase (Japanese); Justin Briner (English)
A knight of the Round who believes that Aoto killed his father.
Tristan (トリスタン, Torisutan)
Voiced by: Natsue Sasamoto (Japanese); Jamie Marchi (English)
Gareth (ガレス, Garesu)
Voiced by: Binbin Takaoka (Japanese); Kent Williams (English)
Kay (ケイ, Kei)
Voiced by: Arisa Kiyoto (Japanese); Michelle Rojas (English)
Lamorak (ラモラック, Ramorakku)
Voiced by: Chihiro Ikki (Japanese); Jeannie Tirado (English)
Percival (パーシヴァル, Pāshivaru)
Voiced by: Yusuke Shirai (Japanese); Aaron Dismuke (English)
Mordred (モルドレッド, Morudoreddo)
Voiced by: Rie Suegara (Japanese); Heather Walker (English)
Palamedes (パロミデス, Paromidesu)
Voiced by: Kenji Nomura (Japanese); Christopher R. Sabat (English)
Gawain (ガウェイン, Gawein)
Voiced by: Yūki Kuwahara (Japanese); Lara Woodhull (English)
Pavlov (パブロフ, Paburofu)
Voiced by: Tomoyuki Shimura (Japanese); Mike McFarland (English)
Akane's father.
Ariton (アリトン, Ariton)
Voiced by: Natsuki Hanae (Japanese); Clifford Chapin (English)
Aoto's younger brother who went missing.
Dorothy (ドロシー, Doroshī)/Elena (エレナ, Erena)
Voiced by: Aoi Yūki (Japanese); Tia Ballard (English)
Midori's childhood friend who went missing.
Santa Claus (サンタクローズ, Santakurōzu)
Voiced by: Takahiro Sakurai (Japanese); Z. Charles Bolton (English)
Arthur's childhood friend.
Schrödinger (シュレディンガー, Shuredingā)
Voiced by: Hiroki Takahashi
Shakespeare (シェイクスピア, Sheikusupia)
Voiced by: Inori Minase (Japanese); Jill Harris (English)
Macbeth (マクベス, Makubesu)
Voiced by: Yō Taichi (Japanese); Amber Lee Connors (English)
Hamlet (ハムレット, Hamuretto)
Voiced by: Yūji Kameyama (Japanese); Aaron Roberts (English)
Othello (オセロ, Osero)
Voiced by: Shō Sudō (Japanese); Alex Organ (English)
Surtr (スルト, Suruto)
Voiced by: Yūsuke Shirai (Japanese); Micah Solusod (English)
Surtr (スルト, Suruto)
Voiced by: Ayumu Murase (Japanese); Kyle Phillips (English)
Höðr (ヘズ, Hezu)
Voiced by: Ayaka Imamura (Japanese); Kristin Sutton (English)
Odin (オーディン, Ōdin)
Voiced by: Yūki Kuwahara (Japanese); Kristi Kang (English)
Hǫgni (ヘグニ, Heguni)
Voiced by: Azusa Tadokoro (Japanese); Felecia Angelle (English)
Hervor (ヘルヴォル, Heruvuoru)
Voiced by: Shizuka Ishigami (Japanese); Ryan Reynolds (English)
Samidare (サミダレ, Samidare)
Voiced by: Hisako Tōjō (Japanese); Marissa Lenti (English)
Ruri (ルリ, Ruri)
Voiced by: Maria Naganawa (Japanese); Jad Saxton (English)

== Media ==
=== Anime ===
An anime television series adaptation by Pierrot aired from January 8 to March 25, 2016. The opening theme is "One Me Two Hearts" by Hitorie, and the ending theme is "Contrast" by vistlip. The series is licensed in North America and the British Isles by Funimation. Anime Limited is releasing the series for Funimation in the United Kingdom and Ireland.

==== Episodes ====
No.	Official English title (Note: All English titles are taken from Funimation.) Original Japanese title	Original release date
1	"Endless Rain"; Transliteration: "Yamanai Ame" (Japanese: 止まない雨)	January 8, 2016
On one rainy day, an Adapter attacks the passengers on a tram. Luckily, Aoto, another Adapter who was at the scene, stops him with his ability. Akane and Midori are ordered by the Academy to recruit Aoto, but they hear a disturbing rumor about him.
2	"Inextinguishable Flame"; Transliteration: "Kesenai Honō" (Japanese: 消せない炎)	January 15, 2016
For Akane, his father meant the world, so he cannot understand why Aoto would kill his own parents. However, Aoto does not share his story either. The colliding two run into each other later, when a patrol Driver suddenly starts to malfunction.
3	"Where the Wind Went"; Transliteration: "Kaze no Yukue" (Japanese: 風の行方)	January 22, 2016
The memory of her and her friend is the reason why Midori pursues the Divine Gate. When Arthur announced that they will start the search of the Divine Gate, Midori has mixed feelings; She wants to find the answer to her question, but she is also afraid.
4	"Blue Memory"; Transliteration: "Aoi Kioku" (Japanese: 蒼い記憶)	January 29, 2016
Concerned about Aoto's emotional disconnect, Akane and Midori look him up on the academy server, but his information were classified. Determined, the two steal Undine's access pass and finds out that Aoto is a suspect of the Blue Christmas massacre.
5	"Disobedient People"; Transliteration: "Matsuro Wanu Min" (Japanese: まつろわぬ民)	February 5, 2016
Akane and the team go to an abandoned section for special training. During the latter part of their training, they meet a group called "The Defiers." Hybrid of human and animals, they have super strengths, and begins attacking Akane and the team.
6	"More Important Than Yourself"; Transliteration: "Jibun yori Taisetsu na Mono" (Japanese: 自分より大切なもの)	February 12, 2016
Arthur finally decides to go find the Divine Gate. He asks the members of the Knights of Rounds as well as the select few from the Academy to join him on this expedition. However, Loki and Oz set out on their own mission as well in response.
7	"Where It Began"; Transliteration: "Hajimari no ji" (Japanese: はじまりの地)	February 19, 2016
Led by Arthur, the Knights of Round and the Adapters from the Academy head for the Divine Gate. Arthur explains that his wish is to destroy the Gate and return the world to its original state. However, Loki and Oz stand in their way to stop them.
8	"Two Paths"; Transliteration: "Futatsunomichi" (Japanese: 二つの道)	February 26, 2016
Akane and the team were able to escape the collapsing Divine Gate, but Arthur has gone missing and the World Council has imposed a martial law to find everyone. Meanwhile, Loki joins the Geniuses of Divine and has something else up his sleeve.
9	"The Divine Play"; Transliteration: "Hijiri geki no gikyoku" (Japanese: 聖劇の戯曲)	March 4, 2016
Akane, Midori, and Aoto are separated from their advisers and magically find themselves acting in a play, conspired by Loki and Shakespeare. As they are forced to play their part, they each meet someone who they've been looking for...
10	"The Key to the Gate"; Transliteration: "Tobira no kagi" (Japanese: 扉の鍵)	March 11, 2016
After escaping Shakespeare's divine play, Akane, Midori, and Aoto find themselves inside the zone. Aoto already holds the key to the Gate, but Akane and Midori do not. Unfortunately, Loki already has that figured out, and great tragedy awaits the two.
11	"Your Name…"; Transliteration: "Kimi no na wa…" (Japanese: 君の名は…)	March 18, 2016
With "despair" being the key to the Divine Gate, both Akane and Midori's loss of their significant person tragically gives them access to the Gate as well. However, Aoto is up for more despair as he faces his twin brother, Ariton.
12	"Beyond the Gate"; Transliteration: "Tobira no saki e" (Japanese: 扉の先へ)	March 25, 2016
Led by the spirit of the key, Akane, Midori, and Aoto reaches the front of the Gate. There, the Key gives them the option to choose their own fate. However, they quickly learn that the Divine Gate is much more than just something that grants wishes...
