= Showa crater =

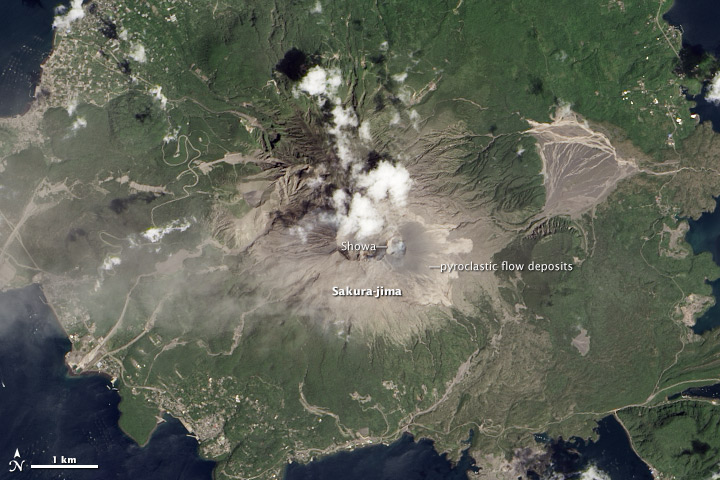
Sakura-jima eruption as seen on August 18, 2013

Showa crater is a feature on Sakurajima mountain volcano, in southern Japan. On 18 August 2013, the volcano erupted from Showa crater and produced its highest recorded plume of ash since 2006, rising 5,000 metres (16,000 ft) high and causing darkness and significant ash falls on the central part of Kagoshima city. The eruption occurred at 16:31 and was the 500th eruption of the year. Showa crater is monitored with infrared video and regular video cameras.

Showa crater is located on the eastern flank of Minami-dake (Southern Peak) of Sakurajima volcano.

Showa crater appeared in 1939 after one month of eruptions that year, at an elevation of 800 feet.

It continued to have intermittent eruptions for the next, almost a decade. There was a large lava flow out of Showa crater in 1946, which destroyed the village of Kurokami. In July 1948 Showa stopped erupting and remained quiet for 58 years. The dormancy ended in 2006, when eruptions out the crater resumed.

Examples of events at Showa crater (see also Sakurajima volcano)

- 1939-1948 misc. eruptions
- 2006 eruption
- 2013 eruption
- In July 2016 a 5 km high column of ash erupted out of Showa crater.
