= One Me Two Hearts =

"One-Me-Two-Hearts"

Single by Hitorie

from the album Deeper
- Language: Japanese
- English title: One-Me-Two-Hearts
- Published: CD single, Digital download
- Released: January 27, 2016
- Recorded: 2015
- Genre: Post-punk revival, Math rock, J-pop
- Length: 3:42
- Label: Hinichijou Records (Sony Music Associated)
- Songwriter: wowaka
- Producer: wowaka

Hitorie singles chronology
"Shutter Doll" (2015)	"One-Me-Two-Hearts" (2016)	"Polaris" (2018)

"One Me Two Hearts" (styled as One-Me-Two-Hearts, Japanese: ワンミーツハー, Hepburn: Wan Mītsu Hā) is a song by Japanese rock band Hitorie. It was released on January 27, 2016, through Hinichijou Records, an imprint of Sony Music Associated Records, as the band's third major-label single. The song served as the opening theme for the anime series Divine Gate and was later included as a lead track for the band's second studio album, Deeper (2016).

== Background and release ==
The single was announced on November 18, 2015, during a Niconico Live broadcast for the Divine Gate anime. The release followed a period of high activity for the band, occurring shortly after their second single "Shutter Doll" and the reissue of their indie discography. Prior to the physical release, the song was featured in the second promotional video for the anime. On December 17, 2015, a trailer video was released on YouTube, providing previews of the title track, the DVD "play movies," and the acoustic version.

The single was released in two formats, available as limited-time productions until March 2016:

- Period Limited Edition A (CD+DVD): Features a monochromatic cover art centered on a colored anatomical heart model. The CD includes "minus-one" tracks for each instrument, while the DVD features "play movies" of each member's performance captured in a single, non-cut long take from three different angles.
- Period Limited Edition B (CD): Features a Digipak with line-art character designs from the anime. This version includes a "TV edit" and the band's first acoustic version of a title track.

== Anime tie-in ==
The song was used as the opening theme for the 2016 anime adaptation of the smartphone game Divine Gate, which premiered on January 8, 2016, on Tokyo MX and other networks. The series was directed by Noriyuki Abe and produced by Studio Pierrot. Frontman wowaka stated that the lyrics and title, meaning "one-Me two-Hearts," refer to the theme of opening an "unknown door" within oneself, which correlates with the adolescent themes of the series.

== Promotion and live performances ==
Hitorie promoted the single through a series of "bAnd" two-man live events, performing with Mo'some Tonebender and The Band Apart. This was followed by a 14-date nationwide tour, "one-Me Tour 'DEEP/SEEK'", from March 9 to April 29, 2016. Live footage of the song from the tour's final show at Shinkiba Studio Coast was captured using 30 cameras and released on their first live video album in August 2016.

== Composition and music video ==
Written and composed by frontman wowaka, the song is a high-speed rock track with technical instrumentation. The music video, directed by Hidenobu Tanabe, was released on January 6, 2016. It features a high-contrast red and blue color palette and an anatomical heart motif, matching the artwork of the Limited Edition A cover.

== Track listing ==
All tracks are written and composed by wowaka.

Period Limited Edition A

No.	Title	Length
1.	"One-Me-Two-Hearts"	3:42
2.	"One-Me-Two-Hearts (Instrumental)"	3:42
3.	"One-Me-Two-Hearts (non-wowaka)"	3:42
4.	"One-Me-Two-Hearts (non-shinoda)"	3:42
5.	"One-Me-Two-Hearts (non-ygarshy)"	3:42
6.	"One-Me-Two-Hearts (non-yumao)"	3:42

Period Limited Edition B

No.	Title	Length
1.	"One-Me-Two-Hearts"	3:42
2.	"One-Me-Two-Hearts (TV edit)"	1:30
3.	"One-Me-Two-Hearts (acoustic ver.)"	4:00

== Personnel ==
- wowaka – lead vocals, guitar
- Shinoda (シノダ) – guitar, backing vocals
- Ygarshy (イガラシ) – bass
- Yumao (ゆーまお) – drums
