= Yu-ri Yoshida =

Japanese voice actress and singer

- 吉田 有里
- Born: 18 August
- Occupation: Voice actress
- Years active: 2012–present
- Employer: Sigma Seven
- Notable work: Engaged to the Unidentified as Mashiro Mitsumine; Brave Beats as Adrienne; Hinako Note as Ruriko Kuroyanagi; BanG Dream! as Hagumi Kitazawa; FLCL Alternative as Tomomi Heta/Pets; Cardfight!! Vanguard Gaiden if as Shuka

Yu-ri Yoshida (吉田 有里, Yoshida Yūri; born 18 August) is a Japanese voice actress from Saga Prefecture, affiliated with Sigma Seven. She is known for starring as Mashiro Mitsumine in Engaged to the Unidentified, Chiranosuke in Punch Line, Adrienne in Brave Beats, Ruriko Kuroyanagi in Hinako Note, Kuruha Amō in Idol Incidents, Hagumi Kitazawa in BanG Dream!, Tomomi Heta/Pets in FLCL Alternative, and Shuka in Cardfight!! Vanguard Gaiden if.

== Biography ==
Yu-ri Yoshida, a native of Saga Prefecture, was born on 18 August. In 2012, she made her career debut with the CD release Denpa Song Tsūshin-bu: Dengeki Sakusen Tornado, which she performed with Rei Matsuzaki and Shiori Mikami.

In 2014, it was announced that Yoshida would make her anime debut as Mashiro Mitsumine, a main character in Engaged to the Unidentified; she reprised her role in the 2015 crossover game Miracle Girls Festival. She later starred as Chiranosuke in Punch Line, Adrienne in Brave Beats, and Ruriko Kuroyanagi in Hinako Note. She was part of the Idol Incidents multimedia project, portraying Kuruha Amō in the tie-in unit Smile X, and she starred in their 2017 anime.

in 2017, Yoshida joined Bushiroad's BanG Dream! franchise as the voice of Hagumi Kitazawa, the bass player of the Hello, Happy World! in-universe band. She has voiced the character in the franchise's game BanG Dream! Girls Band Party! and titular anime television series. She has also voiced the character in the chibi short anime spinoff BanG Dream! Girls Band Party! Pico and in the animated concert film spin-off Film Live.

In 2018, Yoshida starred as Tomomi Heta/Pets in FLCL Alternative. In 2020, she starred as Shuka in Cardfight!! Vanguard Gaiden if and Lactic Acid Bacteria/Kuro in Hataraku Saibō!!: Saikyō no Teki, Futatabi. Karada no Naka wa "Chō" Ōsawagi!. She was one of the four singers of "Koi! Koi Koi", the ending theme of the 2023 Toilet-Bound Hanako-kun shorts spinoff After-School Hanako-kun. She switched affiliation from Sigma Seven E to Sigma Seven on 1 July 2023.

Yoshida is a certified Sauna and Spa Health Advisor. She is a fan of Japanese football international Atsuto Uchida.

== Filmography ==
=== Animated television ===
Year	Title	Role	Ref.
2014	Cardfight!! Vanguard G	Vangarō	
2014	Engaged to the Unidentified	Mashiro Mitsumine	
2014	Makimaki! Kinoi-kun	Kinoi-kun	
2014	Tribe Cool Crew	Momiji Ōgarasu	
2015	Brave Beats	Adrienne	
2015	Punch Line	Chiranosuke	
2016	Divine Gate	Metabon	
2017	Hinako Note	Ruriko Kuroyanagi	
2017	Idol Incidents	Kuruha Amō	
2017	Urahara	Shirako	
2018–2022	BanG Dream! Girls Band Party! Pico	Hagumi Kitazawa	
2018	FLCL Alternative	Tomomi Heta/Pets	
2018	Magical Girl Ore	Demon	
2018	Zombie Land Saga		
2019	African Office Worker	Karasu	
2019–2020	BanG Dream!	Hagumi Kitazawa	
2019	Märchen Mädchen	Alice	
2019	Wasteful Days of High School Girls	Otomo	
2020	Cardfight!! Vanguard Gaiden if	Shuka	
2020	Mewkledreamy	Fairy	
2020	Toilet-Bound Hanako-kun	Mokke A	
2020	Zozozo Zombie-kun	Woman	
2021	Cells at Work!	Lactic Acid Bacteria/Kuro	

=== Animated film ===
Year	Title	Role	Ref.
2017	Kirakira Pretty Cure a la Mode the Movie: Crisply! The Memory of Mille-feuille!	Kyodai Sweets	
2019	BanG Dream! Film Live	Hagumi Kitazawa	
2020	Hataraku Saibō!!: Saikyō no Teki, Futatabi. Karada no Naka wa "Chō" Ōsawagi!	Lactic Acid Bacteria/Kuro	
2021	BanG Dream! Film Live 2nd Stage	Hagumi Kitazawa	

=== Original net animation ===
Year	Title	Role	Ref.
2018	Monster Strike	Hamushiru	
2019	Arthur Kishiō no Kakusei	Hamsel	

=== Video games ===
Year	Title	Role	Ref.
2015	Miracle Girls Festival	Mashiro Mitsumine	
2015	Sangokushi Puzzle Taisen	Zhangmu	
2017	BanG Dream! Girls Band Party!	Hagumi Kitazawa	
2017	Quiz RPG: The World of Mystic Wiz	Story Hist	
2018	Onsen Musume	Konpira Momoe	
2018	Plecatus no Tenbin	Sania Eitley	
2019	Epic Seven	Arkasus	
2019	Shōjo to Dragon: Genjuu Keiyaku Cryptract	Lelui, Melina	
2019	Tenka Hyakken: Zan	Mōri Tōshirō	
