= Brave Beats =

Japanese anime television series

- Poster of Brave Beats, showcasing the main characters

ブレイブビーツ (Bureibu Bītsu)
- Genre: Dance, superhero
- Created by: BN Pictures
- Anime television series
- Directed by: Yūta Murano
- Produced by: Chieko Kusunoki (Mētele); Akiko Hirayama (Asatsu-DK); Isao Minegishi (BN Pictures)
- Written by: Atsuhiro Tomioka
- Music by: avex proworks; A-bee
- Studio: BN Pictures
- Original network: ANN (Nagoya TV, TV Asahi)
- Original run: October 11, 2015 – March 27, 2016
- Episodes: 22

Brave Beats (ブレイブビーツ, Bureibu Bītsu) is a Japanese anime television series produced by BN Pictures. It aired on Nagoya TV and other affiliates of the ANN network from October 11, 2015, to March 27, 2016, when it was replaced by Mobile Suit Gundam Unicorn RE:0096 the week after.

== Plot ==
One day, sixth grade student Hibiki Kazaguruma meets a small robot named Breakin. He discovers Breakin can talk, and Breakin tells him that he was banished from the Dance World, and to return, he must collect the Dance Stones, which are scattered all around the planet. Hibiki fuses with Breakin and becomes the dancing superhero Flash Beat. Flash Beat will collect the Dance Stones, but he is not the only one who wants them...

== Characters ==
=== Brave Beats ===
Hibiki Kazaguruma (風車 響, Kazaguruma Hibiki)
Voiced by: Meguru Takahashi
Breakin (ブレイキン, Bureikin)
Voiced by: Toru Sakurai
Flash Beat (フラッシュビート, Furasshu Bīto)
Voiced by: Kōdai Sakai
Kotone Amamiya (天宮 琴音, Amamiya Kotone) / Wink Beat (ウィンクビート, Winku Bīto)
Voiced by: Shiho Kokido
Adeline (アドリーヌ, Adorīnu)
Voiced by: Yu-ri Yoshida
Charlie Tsubasa Kaneyama (鐘山・チャーリー・翼, Kaneyama Chārī Tsubasa) / Air Beat (エアビート, Ea Bīto)
Voiced by: Yuri Yamaoka (Tsubasa), Satoshi Hino (Air Beat)
Air Step Owl (エアステップアウル, Ea Suteppu Auru)
Voiced by: Wataru Yokojima

=== Villains ===
Mink (ミンク, Minku)
Tank (タンク, Tanku)
Maito Kamiya (神谷 舞人, Kamiya Maito) / Choreo (コレオ, Koreo)
Bunga Banga (ブンガバンガ, Bungabanga)

=== Others ===
Yaharta (ヤハータ, Yahāta) / Dance King (ダンス王, Dansu ō)

== Media ==
=== Anime ===
The anime is produced by BN Pictures and aired from October 11, 2015, to March 27, 2016, with the same production team who made the 2014 dance anime series Tribe Cool Crew. The opening theme is "pop that!!" performed by lol, and the ending theme is "Hana Hiraku Toki" performed by Shion Miyawaki. This is the first of TV Asahi's anime in the 21st century to have an ending theme.

== Episode list ==
| No. | Title | Original release date |
|---|---|---|
| 1 | "The Dancing Hero?! Fall in Love with My Dance!!"; Transliteration: "Odoru Hīrō!? Ore no Dansu ni aretemina!!" (Japanese: 踊るヒーロー！？俺のダンスに惚れてみな！！) | October 11, 2015 |
The Dancerian, Breakin, challenges the King of Dance and loses, getting his Dance Stones scattered across Earth. He must collect them all in order to fight the King again, but he needs the help of an Earthling, Hibiki, to do so.
| 2 | "Dancing Dinosaur's Attack!!!" (Japanese: 踊る恐竜大進撃！！) | October 18, 2015 |
Hibiki and Breakin are arguing and Breakin leaves home! Later there is a new Dance Stone on display in a museum and new villains have come to take it, but when they have a hard time getting out, they give the stone to a fake dinosaur ! The dinosaur is now as real as you and me and it is now dancing! Will Hibiki forgive Breakin and turn into Flash Beat to get the stone?!
| 3 | "Dancing Heroine!! Super Fluffy!"; Transliteration: "Odoru Hiroin!! Chō Mofurū!" (Japanese: 踊るヒロイン！！超モフる～!) | October 25, 2015 |
Kotone is thinking about how Flash Beat always saves her and wants to repay him when a bunny falls into the room from the sky, named Adeline who claims to be a Dancerian! Adeline promises to help Kotone find him, but when they finally find him at a bazaar, he is in a pinch. And in order to save him she becomes Wink Beat!
| 4 | "Fidgety Dancing?! The Fingertip Dance!"; Transliteration: "Ijīji odore?! Yubisaki Dansu!" (Japanese: イジイジ踊れ？！指先ダンス！) | November 8, 2015 |
| 5 | "Rival Appears! Dance Brave!!"; Transliteration: "Raibaru Awararu! Dansu Bureibu!!" (Japanese: 強敵（ライバル）現る！ダンスブレイブ！！) | November 15, 2015 |
| 6 | "Terror! Hell's Dancer"; Transliteration: "Kyōfu! Jigoku no Odoriko" (Japanese: 恐怖！ 地獄の踊り子) | November 22, 2015 |
| 7 | "Precision Dancing! Hibiki and Maito!"; Transliteration: "Pitatto Odore! Hibiki to Maito" (Japanese: ピタッと踊れ！響と舞人) | November 29, 2015 |
| 8 | "The Dancing President is in Elementary School!"; Transliteration: "Odoru Shacho wa Shogakusei!" (Japanese: 踊る社長は小学生！！) | December 6, 2015 |
| 9 | "The Dancing Intersection!!!!"; Transliteration: "Odoru Daikōsaten!!!!" (Japanese: オドる大交差点！！！！) | December 13, 2015 |
| 10 | "Santa Claus is In a Hurry?"; Transliteration: "Santakurōsu wa Awatembō?" (Japanese: サンタクロースは慌てんぼう？) | December 20, 2015 |
| 11 | "A Clash? Our First Errand"; Transliteration: "Gekitō!? Hajimete no Otsukai" (Japanese: 激闘!? はじめてのおつかい) | December 27, 2015 |
| 12 | "A Heart for Love and Dancing? Mink and Tank's Holiday"; Transliteration: "Odoru Koigokoro!? Minku Tanku no Kyūjitsu" (Japanese: 踊る恋心!? ミンク・タンクの休日) | January 17, 2016 |
| 13 | "Let's Chicken! Kotone's Weakness!"; Transliteration: "Rettsu Chikin! Kotone no Jakuten!" (Japanese: レッツチキン! 琴音の弱点!) | January 24, 2016 |
| 14 | "Time Travel! The Cause Was a Pants Stone?!"; Transliteration: "Taimu Surippu! Kikkake wa Pantsu Stōn?" (Japanese: タイムスリップ! きっかけはパンツストーン?) | January 31, 2016 |
| 15 | "The Dancing Prince Looks Just Like Me?!"; Transliteration: "Odoru Ōji wa Sokkuri-san!?" (Japanese: 踊る王子はそっくりさん!?) | February 7, 2016 |
| 16 | "The Dancing Woman Ninja! My Mother's Secret!?"; Transliteration: "Odoru Kunoichi! Kāsan no Himitsu!?" (Japanese: 踊るくの一！母さんのヒミツ！？) | February 14, 2016 |
| 17 | "Hustle, Tsubasa! The Dancing Birthday Party!"; Transliteration: "Hassuru Tsubasa! Odoru Tanjōbikai! !" (Japanese: ハッスル翼！踊る誕生日会！！) | February 21, 2016 |
| 18 | "Scattering Sweat! The Dancing King of Dance!"; Transliteration: "Dobichiru Ase!!! Odoru Dansu Ō" (Japanese: どびちる汗！！！踊るダンス王) | February 28, 2016 |
| 19 | "I Saw It! Maito's Heart is a Mystery!"; Transliteration: "Ore wa Mita! Maito no Kokoro wa Misuterī" (Japanese: 俺は見た!舞人の心はミステリー) | March 6, 2016 |
| 20 | "Hibiki and Maito"; Transliteration: "Hibiki to Maito" (Japanese: 響と舞人) | March 14, 2016 |
| 21 | "Stand Up, Hibiki! The Decisive Battle in Danceworld!"; Transliteration: "Tachiagare Hibiki! Kessen Dansu Wārudo!" (Japanese: 立ち上がれ響! 決戦ダンスワールド!!) | March 20, 2016 |
| 22 | "Step On! Fall in Love With Our Dance!!"; Transliteration: "Suteppuon! Oretachi no dansu ni horete mina!!" (Japanese: ステップオン! 俺達のダンスに惚れてみな!!) | March 27, 2016 |
The Brave Beats have their final battle with Choreo. When the battle is over it's time for the Brave Beat Dancers to say goodbye to their beloved Vice Step beats
