= Toilet-Bound Hanako-kun =

Japanese manga series and its franchise

- First tankōbon volume cover, featuring Hanako

地縛少年花子くん (Jibaku Shōnen Hanako-kun)
- Genre: Comedy; Supernatural
- Manga
- Written by: AidaIro
- Published by: Square Enix
- English publisher: NA: Yen Press
- Magazine: Monthly GFantasy
- Original run: June 18, 2014 – present
- Volumes: 25 + 1
- Manga

After-School Hanako-kun
- Written by: AidaIro
- Published by: Square Enix
- English publisher: NA: Yen Press
- Magazine: pixiv Comic (PFantapy)
- Original run: February 22, 2018 – present
- Volumes: 2
- Anime television series
- Directed by: Masaomi Andō (S1); Yōhei Fukui (S2)
- Written by: Yasuhiro Nakanishi
- Music by: Hiroshi Takaki
- Studio: Lerche
- Licensed by: Crunchyroll
- Original network: TBS, CBC, BS-TBS, SUN (S1); JNN (TBS) (S2)
- English network: SEA: Animax Asia
- Original run: January 10, 2020 – September 21, 2025
- Episodes: 36
- Anime television series

After-School Hanako-kun
- Directed by: Masaki Kitamura
- Written by: Kazuma Nagatomo
- Music by: Hiroshi Takaki
- Studio: Lerche
- Licensed by: Crunchyroll
- Original network: TBS
- Original run: October 13, 2023 – October 28, 2024
- Episodes: 8
- icon

Toilet-Bound Hanako-kun (Japanese: 地縛少年花子くん, Hepburn: Jibaku Shōnen Hanako-kun; lit. 'Earthbound Spirit Boy Hanako-kun') is a Japanese manga series written by Iro and illustrated by Aida, which results in their conjoined name 'AidaIro'. It has been serialized in Square Enix's magazine Monthly GFantasy since 2014. It has been collected in 25 tankōbon volumes as of October 2025. The story follows Nene Yashiro, a first-year high school student fond of occult stories, who ardently desires a boyfriend. For this, she tries to invoke Hanako-san from the toilet.

The manga is licensed in North America by Yen Press. An anime television series adaptation produced by Lerche aired from January to March 2020. A new anime project was announced in December 2022, and was subsequently described as a "restart" of the series. The "first installment" of the project, an adaptation of After-School Hanako-kun, aired from October to November 2023; a four-episode sequel aired in October 2024. A second season of the original anime aired from January to March 2025, and the second cours aired from July to September of the same year.

By February 2024, Toilet-Bound Hanako-kun had over 10 million copies in circulation.

== Plot ==
Kamome Academy is famous for its rumors regarding its Seven Wonders and supernatural occurrences. Nene Yashiro, a first-year high-school student who wishes for a boyfriend, summons the Seventh and most famous Wonder, "Hanako-san of the Toilet", the spirit of a girl who allegedly haunts the bathroom and can grant wishes for the right price. Upon summoning her, Nene discovers that "Hanako-san" is nothing like the rumors say; Hanako-san is a boy. With a turn of events, she is spiritually bound to Hanako and becomes his assistant, helping him destroy evil supernaturals and change rumors in order to maintain the balance between the spirit world and the human world. Along the way, Nene learns about her connection to the spirit world and the dark secrets regarding Hanako and his past.

== Characters ==
=== Main characters ===
Hanako (花子くん)
Voiced by: Megumi Ogata (Japanese); Justin Briner (English)
The most famous rumor in the school, Hanako-kun is the Seventh Wonder of Kamome Academy Seven Wonders. According to his rumor, Hanako can be summoned if one knocks on the third stall of the third floor of the girls' bathroom in the old school building; he is able to grant wishes to those who summon him in exchange for a suitable price. The strongest and the leader of the Seven Wonders, Hanako fights with a kitchen knife and his two haku-joudai, spirit orbs that assist him in keeping watch on others and summon to him a cloak that grants immunity to exorcism lightning. His duty is to monitor all of the supernaturals in the school and maintain the balance between them and the humans. Something curious with him is that he has a melodious tone of voice when he speaks, giving the impression that he is always singing.^{[ch. 20]}
Despite being childish and mischievous, Hanako puts up a front to mask his true emotions and is rather serious beneath the surface. He takes his duties seriously, having been promised by God that he would be absolved of his past sins if he fulfilled his duties.^{[ch. 3]} He is secretive about his past life. Previously, his name was Amane Yugi (柚木 普, Yugi Amane) and he also attended Kamome Academy. A second-year middle school student in 1968, he often came to school with bruises and cuts, having been repeatedly abused by someone he refused to reveal the identity of. He harbored a deep passion for astronomy and had dreams of becoming an astronaut and going to the Moon. According to Tsuchigomori, the Fifth Wonder and his homeroom teacher at the time, Hanako was destined to become a science teacher, until his fate changed for unknown reasons. He killed his younger twin brother, Tsukasa Yugi, and died young. Hanako is the only known person to have ever altered his fate.^{[ch. 14]}
By inflicting the Mermaid's Curse on himself, he bound his and Yashiro's souls together. Although he calls her his assistant, deep down, since Hanako-kun met her, he considers her his friend and cares a lot about her. Even more so when he finds out that she only has one year left to live. He wants to give her a long future; he protects her fiercely even though on the surface he teases her and annoys her a lot, he often hugs her and doesn't care getting closer to her whenever he can, and he tends to flirt a lot but when Yashiro takes the first step, he feels embarrassed.
Nene Yashiro (八尋 寧々, Yashiro Nene)
Voiced by: Akari Kitō (Japanese); Tia Ballard (English)
Nene Yashiro is a first-year high school student at Kamome Academy. She summons Hanako and wishes for her crush, Teru Minamoto, to return her feelings. A turn of events occurs, and Yashiro swallows a mermaid's scale, inflicting the Mermaid's Curse on her and turning her into a fish. To grant her new wish of becoming human again, Hanako swallows a scale from the same mermaid to her curse on himself and spread its effects, permitting Yashiro to remain a human child unless she is immersed in water. Having bound their souls together through the curse, he has Yashiro become his human assistant as payment. Yashiro works with Hanako to change and spread new rumors of supernaturals in the school to keep them under control. She is capable of destroying a School Wonder's yorishiro, their source of power; upon doing so, she falls asleep and views the memory associated with the yorishiro.
Yashiro wears two hair clips resembling magatama and a skull brooch on her school uniform. Yashiro is a very positive, beautiful, sensitive, and caring girl. She is deeply insecure and genuinely fears that no one will ever love her back; after receiving the curse, she confesses to Hanako that she had realized what her true wish had been: she wanted someone, anyone, to return her feelings, not Teru specifically.^{[ch. 1]} Yashiro is insecure about her large ankles, often being compared to daikons as a running gag in the series. Her best friend is Aoi Akane, who loves to tell her new rumors.
Despite repeatedly claiming Hanako is not her type and Hanako's relentless teasing, she cares immensely for Hanako and after learning about his past, wants to be able to protect him.^{[ch. 21]} She is intuitive and sensitive to changes in his personality and is deeply affected whenever she learns new information about his past life.
Kou Minamoto (源 光, Minamoto Kō)
Voiced by: Shōya Chiba (Japanese); Tyson Rinehart (English)
Kou Minamoto is a third-year at Kamome Academy's middle school division and the second eldest son of the Minamoto clan, a family of strong exorcists that believe all supernaturals are inherently evil. He uses a trident-like staff called the Raiteijou, a weapon passed down in the Minamoto family that transforms the wielder's spiritual power into lightning that exorcises supernaturals. Tasked by his older brother, Teru, to exorcise all Seven Wonders, Kou attempts to exorcise Hanako but does not possess enough spiritual power to do so. Not giving up, he tags Hanako and Yashiro around the school for a while and comes to the realization that Hanako did not seem to be an 'evil' supernatural. As a result, Kou vows to learn more about him and other supernaturals (like Mitsuba) before blindly exorcising them, much to the dissatisfaction of his brother.^{[ch. 10]}
When Kou finds Mitsuba haunting the lockers, he offers to spend the day with him in attempt to fulfill his final regrets so he can pass on peacefully. The two were in the same homeroom class in the first year and Kou feels guilty for not noticing him back then. After Tsukasa turns Mitsuba into a violent supernatural against his will, Kou watches Hanako destroy Mitsuba and is devastated by the loss of his friend. Enraged and upset, he vows to get stronger to destroy evil supernaturals like Tsukasa.^{[ch. 20]}
Kou is a seeker of justice with a brave and kind personality, though he often finds himself in trouble due to his inexperience and low spiritual power. He is protective of Yashiro when he interprets Hanako as being mean or perverted. A running gag in the series is his earring on his right ear, an omamori that says '交通' (traffic).
Sōsuke Mitsuba (三葉 惣助, Mitsuba Sōsuke)
Voiced by: Daiki Kobayashi (Japanese); Kyle Igneczi (English)
Mitsuba was Kou's middle school classmate in their first year who was killed in a car accident. He became a ghost and haunted the middle school lockers, calling out to students and hoping someone would remember him. Kou sees him after hearing about his rumor and though he doesn't recognize him from school, decides to help him fulfill whatever regret was keeping him at the school in order to help him pass on.
Mitsuba was bullied in elementary school for being rude and cocky, which lead him to repress his personality in middle school in an attempt to be more palatable and polite. However, this simply lead to him going unnoticed by his classmates and making no friends, being forgotten by everyone. He regrets having no friends while he was alive, and in his wish to Tsukasa, said he wanted everyone to recognize and remember him. Because Tsukasa believed his initial wish was too vague, he decides to grant Mitsuba's wish in a way he feels fit. He changes Mitsuba's rumor, turning him into a violent and grotesque supernatural against his will. Tsukasa attempts to have Mitsuba kill Kou and fulfill his wish of being with his friend forever (through death), but Hanako arrives and destroys Mitsuba before he can do so. However, in turning Mitsuba into a supernatural, Tsukasa saved a part of his soul and recreates a new Mitsuba with it, attaching it to a body formed of low-level spirits he had killed. After killing No. 3, Tsukasa forces the new Mitsuba to eat No. 3's heart to become the new Third Mystery. Despite not being the same as the original and having no memories, the new Mitsuba has the same personality and dreams of the original Mitsuba, still desiring friendship and now wishing to become a real human.
Mitsuba was a talented and awarded photographer in the school's photography club, taking photos during his first meeting with Kou. Mitsuba makes up insulting nicknames for people; he calls Kou 'lame-ass traffic safety earring boy', Yashiro 'daikon-senpai', and Hanako 'crazy knife'.^{[ch. 35]} However, underneath his rudeness, Mitsuba is desperate to have friends and truly cares about the people around him. Contrary to popular belief, Mitsuba is not always rude, and mostly just when he is defensive, stressed, or teasing.

=== The Seven Wonders ===
The Seven Wonders of Kamome Academy are the seven most famous supernatural rumors in the school, and their corresponding supernatural serve to maintain the students' safety from murderous supernatural. Leading them is Hanako, who is the Seventh and most famous school Wonder. Each one has their own Boundary, a divine yorishiro, and an aspect of the school that they control. Their Boundary is a section of the school where their power is the strongest. Boundaries are the 'sea' between the Near Shore, where the living reside, and the Far Shore, where other apparitions exist and thus contain a small amount of water on the ground. A divine yorishiro is an item they cherish that acts as the source of their power. When a yorishiro is destroyed (by removing its seal), the Wonder's designated seat as a School Wonder and their power is removed. Thus, they are usually kept in the deepest region of the Boundary or safeguarded by the wonder themselves.

No. 1 – The Three Clock Keepers (三人の時計守, Sannin no Tokeimori)
Voiced by: Hōchū Ōtsuka (Kako), Shun'ichi Toki (Akane), Rie Kugimiya (Mirai) (Japanese); Mac McGee (Kako), Alex Mai (Akane), Kelly Greenshield (Mirai) (English)

Representatives: Kako, Akane Aoi, and Mirai
Aspect: Time

The Three Clock Keepers guard the clock tower of Kamome Academy and control time. Kako controls the past and can rewind time. One of Yashiro's classmates, Akane Aoi (蒼井 茜, Aoi Akane), is a human who is secretly a Clock Keeper; he controls the present and can stop time for five minutes each day. Mirai controls the future and can fast-forward time for someone by touching them. According to the manga, The Clock Keepers punish past-tampering by trapping offenders in the boundary and sealing a fragment of their soul inside a mechanical doll.
No. 2 – The Misaki Stairs (ミサキ階段, Misaki Kaidan)
Voiced by: Yukana (Japanese); Alexis Tipton (English)

Representative: Yako (ヤコ)
Aspect: Space

The Misaki Stairs is a staircase in front of the art room. Anyone who steps on the fourth step is rumored to be transported to the spirit world, shredded to death by "Misaki", and have their blood splattered on the staircase the following day. Yako, the kitsune spirit of a school inari statue, is the current No. 2. She fell in love with Misaki, a Kamome Academy school teacher who could see her, taught her how to read and write, and included her in his class photo. She never saw him again after he was rumored to have died in an accident on the school stairs. As her rumors changed, Yako was forced to shred those who entered her boundary and use their limbs to recreate Misaki. Her yorishiro is a pair of cutting shears, a gift from Misaki.
No. 3 – The Hell of Mirrors (カガミジゴク, Kagami Jigoku)

Representative: Mitsuba (ミツバ)

The Hell of Mirrors is a boundary once controlled by a bird-like supernatural monster. The Mirrors reveal one's deepest fears and insecurities, gaining power based on how much fear the person has. Tsukasa killed the previous representative, and his heart is ingested by Mitsuba, who became the new No. 3.
The current representative can communicate with the 'real world' through mirrors, as well as other reflective materials like window glass (as shown by Mitsuba in the Picture Perfect arc).
No. 4 – Shijima-san of the Art Room (美術室のシジマさん, Bijutsushitsu no Shijima-san)
Voiced by: Kana Hanazawa (Japanese); Hannah Alyea (English)

Representative: Shijima Mei (シジマメイ)

Shijima Mei was a third-year art student rumored to have committed suicide because her parents did not approve of her choice to pursue art professionally; in reality, Mei had been gravely ill and died before she could graduate. While working on an art assignment in the hospital, Mei imagined a fictional world where her alternate, healthy self could draw happily in a tower, wishing for her alternate to draw in her place after she dies. Unknowingly, Mei creates the supernatural Shijima, her alternate, ideal self, who watched over her for the remainder of her life and vowed to protect her. After the human Mei dies, her art is showcased in the art room and sparks the false rumors, which deeply angers Shijima because they tarnish Mei's reputation. Her Boundary is the tower within Mei's painting. She has the power to paint and create fictional worlds where people can live based on their deepest wishes. Her yorishiro is her sketchbook.
No. 5 – The 4 O'clock Library (十六時の書庫, Jūroku-ji no Shoko)
Voiced by: Kenjiro Tsuda (Japanese); Ian Sinclair (English)

Representative: Ryuujirou Tsuchigomori (土籠)
Aspect: Records

The 4 pm Bookstacks is a mysterious room filled with books about every student's past, present and future, whose door is only accessible at 4 pm. The books come in three colors; white books record the living, black books record the dead, and red books contain the future and are forbidden to read. The curator of the Bookstacks is Tsuchigomori, a spider-like supernatural who lives as a human teacher at Kamome Academy. He is currently Kou's homeroom teacher and was previously Hanako's homeroom teacher before he died. As his teacher, he cared for Hanako and was deeply affected when he died. Before his death, Hanako asked Tsuchigomori to keep his most cherished possession, a rock he believed to have fallen from the Moon. The rock becomes Tsuchigomori's yorishiro after Amane Yugi dies.

No. 6 – The Reaper

Voiced by: Jun Fukuyama (Japanese); Derick Snow (English)

Representative: Hakubo

On the night of tsukimi, the Reaper is rumored to steal the lives of those who fall asleep while waiting to view the moon and can be heard playing a melody on the flute by individuals who will die soon. As a result, people weave baskets all night to stay awake and protect those who can hear the melody. The current No. 6 is Shinigami-sama, the God of Death. His Boundary, which lies below the school, is the closest one to the Far Shore. His yorishiro is a girl named Sumire, an ancestor of Aoi who he guarded until she was sacrificed, being a symbol of Hakubo's regret for having not saved her from her sacrifice.
No. 7 – Hanako-san of the Toilet (トイレのはなこさん, Toire no Hanako-san)

Representative: Yugi Amane

The most famous school mystery and leader of Kamome Academy's Seven Wonders. Hanako is referred to as a female, but Hanako is actually a male. He has the power to grant wishes to the living but as compensation, he must take something dear to them in return. To summon him it's only necessary to head to the third stall of the girls bathroom, knock on the door three times, and ask "Hanako-san, Hanako-san, are you there?"

=== Kamome Academy Supernaturals ===
Apart from the Seven Mysteries, there are other, less powerful supernaturals that roam the school. They rely on student rumors to gain power, unlike the Mysteries who already have theirs so popular and widespread among the student body.

Mokke (もっけ, Mokke)
Voiced by: Yu-ri Yoshida, Chitose Morinaga, Mai Kanazawa (Japanese); Lindsay Seidel, Madeleine Morris, Dani Chambers (English)
Known as "Yousei-San", the Mokke are in fact, sweets-loving rabbit-like supernaturals. They have a slight case of kleptomania, enjoy committing small, random acts of theft. Due to their timidness and weak appearance, the Mokke tend to merge together to create large, horrifying creatures to fight off enemies, which scares the student population.
Kodama (木魅, Kodama)
Voiced by: Ryōtarō Okiayu (Japanese); Larry Brantley (English)
Known as "The Confession Tree (告白の木, Kokuhaku no ki)". It was known to be planted by 'The God of Love'. Kodama is actually a spirit in the form of a tree determined to spread love among the students but can be too meddlesome and forceful with its methods. After it is defeated by Hanako, it turns to the size of a broccoli, having been greatly weakened. It slowly grows again after that, but it still rather small.

=== Antagonists ===
Tsukasa Yugi (柚木 つかさ, Yugi Tsukasa)
Voiced by: Megumi Ogata (Japanese); Austin Tindle (English)
Tsukasa is Hanako's younger identical twin brother who was killed by Hanako supposedly at the age of thirteen. He is cheerful and overwhelmingly childish, but his personality switches quickly to show a disturbing and deranged side. He mainly acts on whims, but contrary to common belief, he does have long term goals, specifically concerning Amane and Sakura. The twins have opposing beliefs; while Hanako believes in the importance of maintaining a peaceful balance between humans and supernaturals, Tsukasa believes that the two should behave how they desire, even if it means wreaking tremendous havoc. While Hanako grants wishes to the living, Tsukasa grants wish to the dead. He wears a black short-sleeved kimono with a grey hakama and a white button-up underneath. Opposite of Hanako, he has a black yorishiro seal on his right cheek and uses black koku-joudai willow wisps. Tsukasa works with his assistant, Sakura, to change the rumors of supernaturals in the school.
Sakura Nanamine (七峰 桜, Nanamine Sakura)
Voiced by: Chika Anzai (Japanese); Kara Edwards (English)
A beautiful third-year high school student at Kamome Academy. Similar to Yashiro, she became Tsukasa's assistant after he promised to grant her wish to leave the school. She is the president of the Broadcasting Club and helps him broadcast altered rumors of supernaturals. Sakura is usually stoic and gets annoyed with both Natsuhiko and Tsukasa, resorting to imagining Tsukasa as a cat rather than a boy, making his actions more palatable.
Natsuhiko Hyūga (日向 夏彦, Hyūga Natsuhiko)
Voiced by: Takahiro Mizushima (Japanese); Aaron Dismuke (English)
A second-year student at Kamome Academy and a member of the Broadcasting Club. He is often seen trying to win Sakura's affection but to no avail. Though not bound to Tsukasa, Natsuhiko helps in Tsukasa's schemes. In chapter 104 of the manga it is revealed that the blood flowing through his veins is extremely toxic to supernatural beings.

=== Others ===
Teru Minamoto (源 輝, Minamoto Teru)
Voiced by: Yuma Uchida (Japanese); David Matranga (English)
A second-year high school student, the student body president, and the most popular male student in the school. He is Kou's older brother and the eldest son of the Minamoto Clan. A prodigious exorcist, he was trained by his family elders since he was young to exorcise supernaturals and instilled with the family sentiment that all supernaturals are inherently evil. While he seems to only have a black and white view on supernaturals, he lets the Mokke and Tsuchigomori live, but if a supernatural can cause harm, he says you have to kill it without a second thought. Despite his calm and gentle appearance, he is ruthless and frighteningly perceptive. He harbors a slightly sadistic streak, frequently doing things to Akane-kun. He dotes on his younger siblings and wants Kou to exorcise the Seven Mysteries so he can get stronger. Teru often spends his nights exorcising supernaturals, forcing him to only sleep after school.
Aoi Akane (赤根 葵, Akane Aoi)
Voiced by: Minako Sato (Japanese); Emily Neves (English)
A first-year high school student and Yashiro's best friend. The school's prettiest and most popular girl. She enjoys rumors about the Seven Mysteries and recounting their stories to Yashiro. All the rumors she tells comes true, but this is only because all rumors in general come true, and as the popular girl, people listen to her. Aoi and Yashiro are both in the Gardening Club. Akane Aoi is her neighbor and childhood friend. Aoi is a Kannagi, and distantly related to Sumire.
Lemon Yamabuki (山吹 檸檬, Yamabuki Remon)
Voiced by: Genki Okawa (Japanese); Aaron Campbell (English)
A first-year student at Kamome Academy and Akane's best friend. He acts nonchalant and is often seen on his phone.
Shun Yokoo & Yomogi Satou (横尾瞬 & 佐藤蓬, Yokoo Shun & Satou Yomogi)
Voiced by: Shoutarou Uzawa (Yokoo), Teppei Uenishi (Satou) (Japanese); Kyle Phillips (Yokoo), Stephen Fu (Satou) (English)
Two third-year middle school students at Kamome Academy and Kou's best friends. Yokoo enjoys sports is usually relaxed and cheerful. Satou enjoys baking and sweets, he usually has a stern and serious personality.

== Media ==
=== Manga ===
Toilet-Bound Hanako-kun is written by Iro and illustrated by Aida, resulting in their conjoined names 'AidaIro'. The series started in the July 2014 issue of Square Enix's Monthly GFantasy, published on June 18, 2014. Square Enix has compiled its chapters into individual tankōbon volumes. The first volume was published on May 22, 2015. A volume 0 was released on December 27, 2019. As of October 27, 2025, 25 volumes have been published. In October 2025, it was announced that the manga would go on an indefinite hiatus due to Aida's medical treatment for an undisclosed illness. In the meantime, the magazine republished previous chapters and would announce the return date of the manga as soon as it was decided. The series is set to resume on August 18, 2026.

In North America, Yen Press announced in July 2017 that they would publish the manga digitally. In July 2019, Yen Press announced the print release of the series.

A spin-off manga series titled Hōkago Shōnen Hanako-kun launched online on February 22, 2018. It was licensed by Yen Press under the title After-School Hanako-kun; and released in April 2021.

=== Anime ===
An anime television series adaptation was announced in the April issue of Monthly GFantasy magazine on March 18, 2019. It is animated by Studio Hibari's subsidiary Lerche and directed by Masaomi Andō, with Yasuhiro Nakanishi handling series composition, Mayuka Itou designing the characters, and Hiroshi Takaki composing the music. The series aired from January 10 to March 27, 2020, on TBS, SUN, CBC, and BS-TBS. (Note: TBS lists the series premiere on January 9 at 25:58, which is effectively January 10 at 1:58 a.m. JST.) The opening theme song is "No.7", performed by Jibaku Shōnen Band, while the ending theme song is "Tiny Light", performed by Akari Kitō. Funimation licensed the series for a SimulDub, which following Sony's acquisition of the namesake platform thereafter, it was moved to Crunchyroll.

In December 2022, a new anime project was announced, and was subsequently described as a "restart" of the series. In August 2023, a short anime television series adaptation of After-School Hanako-kun was announced, and is labeled as the "first installment" of the project. It is produced by Lerche and directed by Masaki Kitamura, with scripts written by Kazuma Nagatomo, character designs handled by Aya Higami, who also served as chief animation director, and music composed by Hiroshi Takaki. The series aired from October 13 to November 3, 2023, and is composed of 10-minute episodes. (Note: TBS lists the series premiere on October 12 at 25:58, which is effectively October 13 at 1:58 a.m. JST.) Akari Kitō, Yu-ri Yoshida, Chitose Morinaga, and Mai Kanazawa performed the ending theme song "Koi! Koi Koi" (来い！濃い恋; "Come to Me, Deep Love!"). Crunchyroll licensed the series.

In November 2023, a four-episode sequel to After-School Hanako-kun was announced, and aired from October 7 to 28, 2024. It was also revealed that a second season of the original anime had been greenlit, which aired from January 12 to March 30, 2025, on all JNN affiliates, including TBS. For the first cours, the opening theme song is "L'oN", performed by Masayoshi Ōishi, while the ending theme song is "With a Wish", performed by Akari Kitō. Following the finale of the second season, a second cours was announced, and aired from July 6 to September 21, 2025. For the second cours, the opening theme song is "Kagome Kagome", performed by the same artist, while the ending theme song is "mo∞ent", also performed by the same artist.

=== Musical ===
A stage musical adaptation produced by Polygon Magic ran in the Cool Japan Park Osaka TT Hall from January 22 to 24, 2021 and at the Tokyo Dome City Theater G-Rosso from January 28 to 31, 2021. It was directed by Kо̄tarо̄ Yoshitani, with Sayaka Asai writing the screenplay and lyrics, tak composing the music, Rika Mizuno as the music director and singing instructor, and Mamoru as the choreographer. The musical starred Eito Konishi as Hanako, Akari Takaishi as Nene Yashiro, Riki Tanimizu as Kou Minamoto, Ginga Shitara as Tsukasa Yugi, Daiki Mihara as Mitsuba, Fuyuna Asakura as Aoi Akane, Karen Sakura as Yako, Yūna Sekine as Sakura Nanamine, Hiromu Kuroda as Natsuhiko Hyūga, and Yūya Asato as Ryuujirou Tsuchigomori.

== Reception ==
By February 2024, Toilet-Bound Hanako-kun had over 10 million copies in circulation.

The series ranked fifth on AnimeJapan's "Most Wanted Anime Adaptation" poll in 2019.

In a review of the anime series for NEO, Jones Alex praised the series and characters for being engaging, as well as the unique visuals, comparing Hanako-kun to a comic book brought to life, utilizing thick outlines, vibrant colors and distinct character proportions.

In 2024, the series' first box set published by Yen Press was nominated for the Eisner Awards in the "Best Publication Design" category.

By the end of the summer anime season in 2025 after season 2 part 2 aired the Toilet Bound Hanako-Kun anime was ranked seventh on the Anitrend top ten most popular anime list. It had previously spent 11 weeks ranked on the list with its record highest rank being third most popular.
