= Sakurajima radish =

Japanese radish cultivar

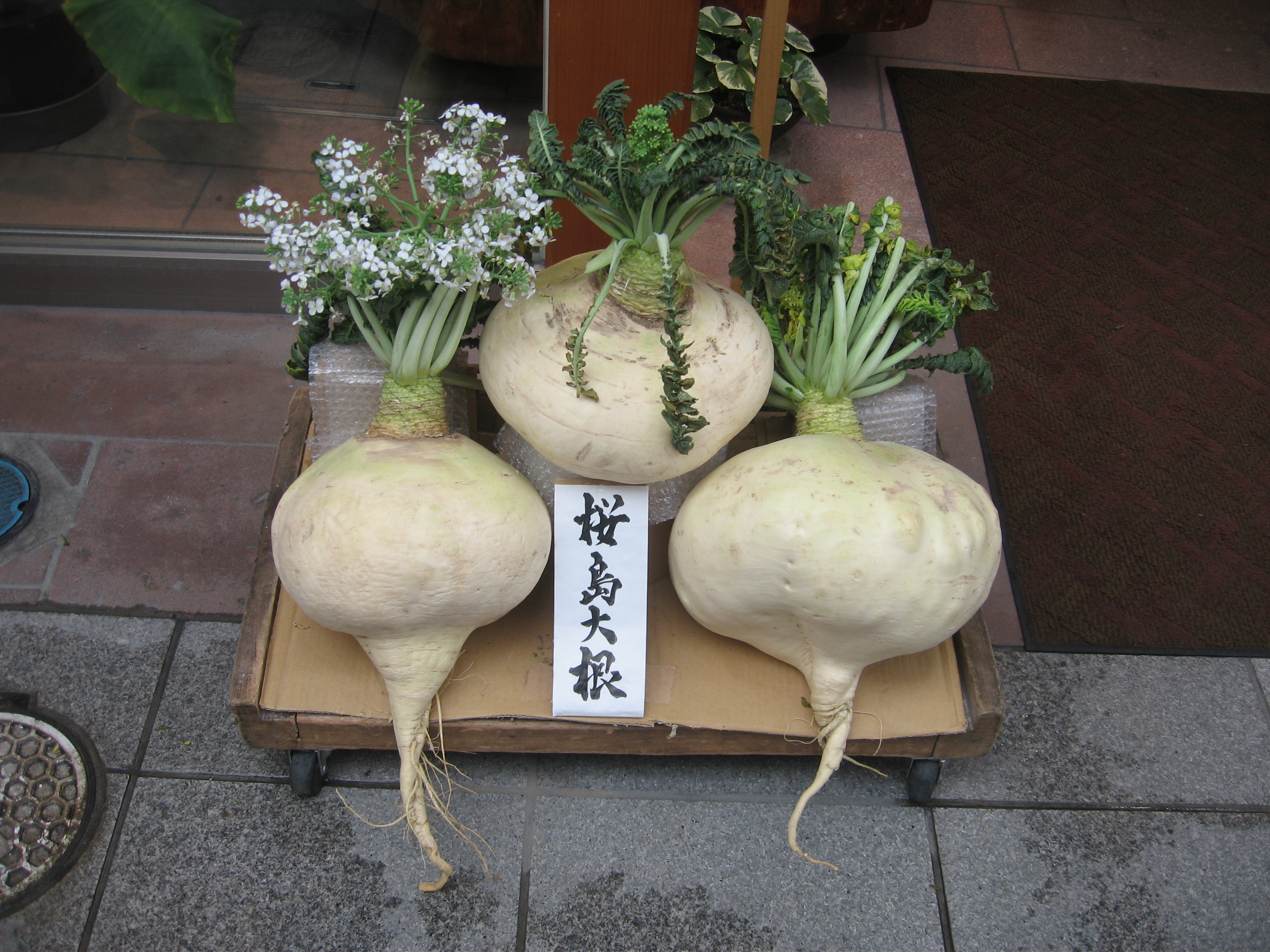
- A selection of Sakurajima radishes
- Genus: Raphanus
- Species: Raphanus sativus (syn. Raphanus raphanistrum subsp. sativus)
- Variety: See text.
- Cultivar group: Sakurajima radishes
- Origin: Japan

The Sakurajima radish or Sakurajima daikon (Japanese: 桜島大根, Sakurajima daikon) is a special cultivar of the Japanese radish named for its original place of cultivation, the former island of Sakurajima in Japan's Kagoshima Prefecture. It is the largest radish variety in the world. Its regular weight is about 6 kilograms (13 lb), although large ones can be as much as 27 kg (60 lb). It can grow as large as 50 cm (20 in) in diameter. It is also sometimes known in Japanese as shimadekon (しまでこん, "island daikon").

The three varieties are early, middle, and late, but the most commonly encountered form is the late. The seeding period is from last August to first September and the harvest season is from December to February. To reach full size, special care needs to be taken with the region's volcanic-ash soil.

== Taxonomy ==
Various scientific names have been given to cultivated radishes. Sources may use Raphanus sativus or Raphanus raphanistrum subsp. sativus. The species may then be divided into one or more varieties, e.g. var. acanthiformis Nakai, var. hortensis Backer, or var. longipinnatus L.H. Bailey.

== Names ==
In English, the Sakurajima radish is also sometimes known as the Sakurajima island giant radish, giant daikon, or jumbo daikon.

== Uses ==
Sakurajima radish has a fine texture and is low in fiber. It is sweeter than other varieties of Japanese radish. In Japanese cuisine, it is typically prepared by simmering to produce dishes such as furofuki daikon. Kiriboshi daikon and tsukemono are popular prepared foods which also employ the radish. The large size of tsukemono, senmaizuke, is sold in souvenir shops in Kagoshima.

== History ==
Three theories are given about its development:

1. An origin from an original wild daikon in Sakurajima
2. An origin from hōryō daikon in Aichi Prefecture
3. An origin from kokubu daikon (hamanoichi daikon)

An 1804 mention of Kagoshima in reference to the giant Sakurajima radish shows it was cultured before then at least. The main production was north-west of Sakurajima, but it was moved to the north later. About 1200 farm houses had about 200 hectares (490 acres) of growing area in total in the high season. Sakurajima radish is one of the most precious local commercial crops. Also, in every harvest season, the toikae (Kagoshima dialect for "market") was held in Kajiki (now part of Aira District) and people traded Sakurajima radishes with straw. However, the main crop was shifted to satsuma (mikan) from Sakurajima radishes, because the area of Sakurajima suffered so much damage from a 1914 eruption of the nearby volcano, decreasing the growing area to about 30 hectares (74 acres) by 1955. Furthermore, its growing area was decreased to about 1.5 hectares (3.7 acres) owing to ashfall between then and 2001.

The main growing districts of now are the suburbs of Kagoshima city and Kirishima city. Because of fewer eruptions recently, the growing area has been extended.
