= Japanese radish =

Japanese vegetable

Japanese radish (true daikon)
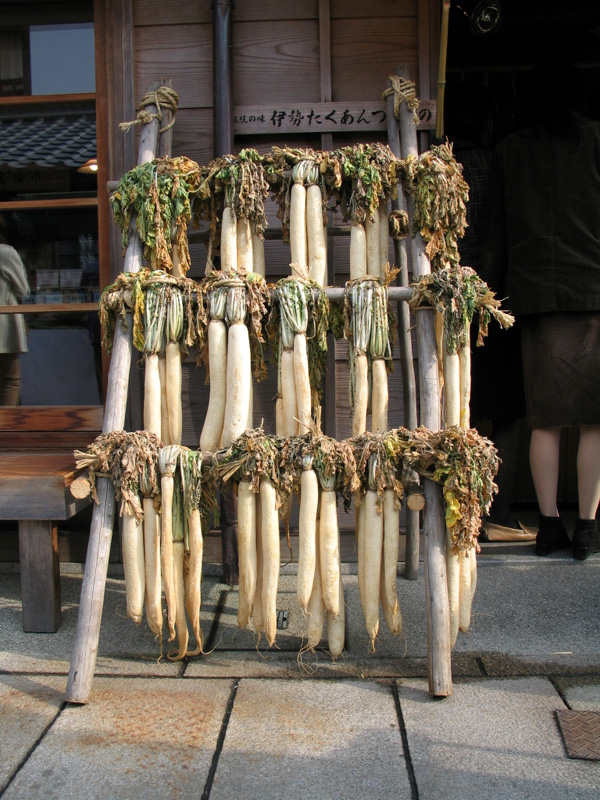
- Radishes in Okage Yoko-chō, Japan

Chinese name
- Traditional Chinese: 日本蘿蔔
- Simplified Chinese: 日本萝卜
- Literal meaning: "Japanese radish"
Transcriptions
Standard Mandarin
- Hanyu Pinyin: rìběn luóbo
- Wade–Giles: jih-pên luo-po

Korean name
- Hangul: 왜무
- Literal meaning: Wae radish
Transcriptions
- Revised Romanization: waemu
- McCune–Reischauer: waemu

Japanese name
- Kanji: 大根
- Kana: だいこん
Transcriptions
- Romanization: daikon

Daikon (大根; lit. 'great root') is a generic term for radish in Japanese language. For example, European radish is called hatsukadaikon (廿日大根) in Japan. In the West, the word daikon sometimes refers to long white Asian radish varieties and sometimes Japanese radish varieties. When it is necessary to distinguish the usual Japanese form from others, it is sometimes known as Japanese radish or "true daikon".

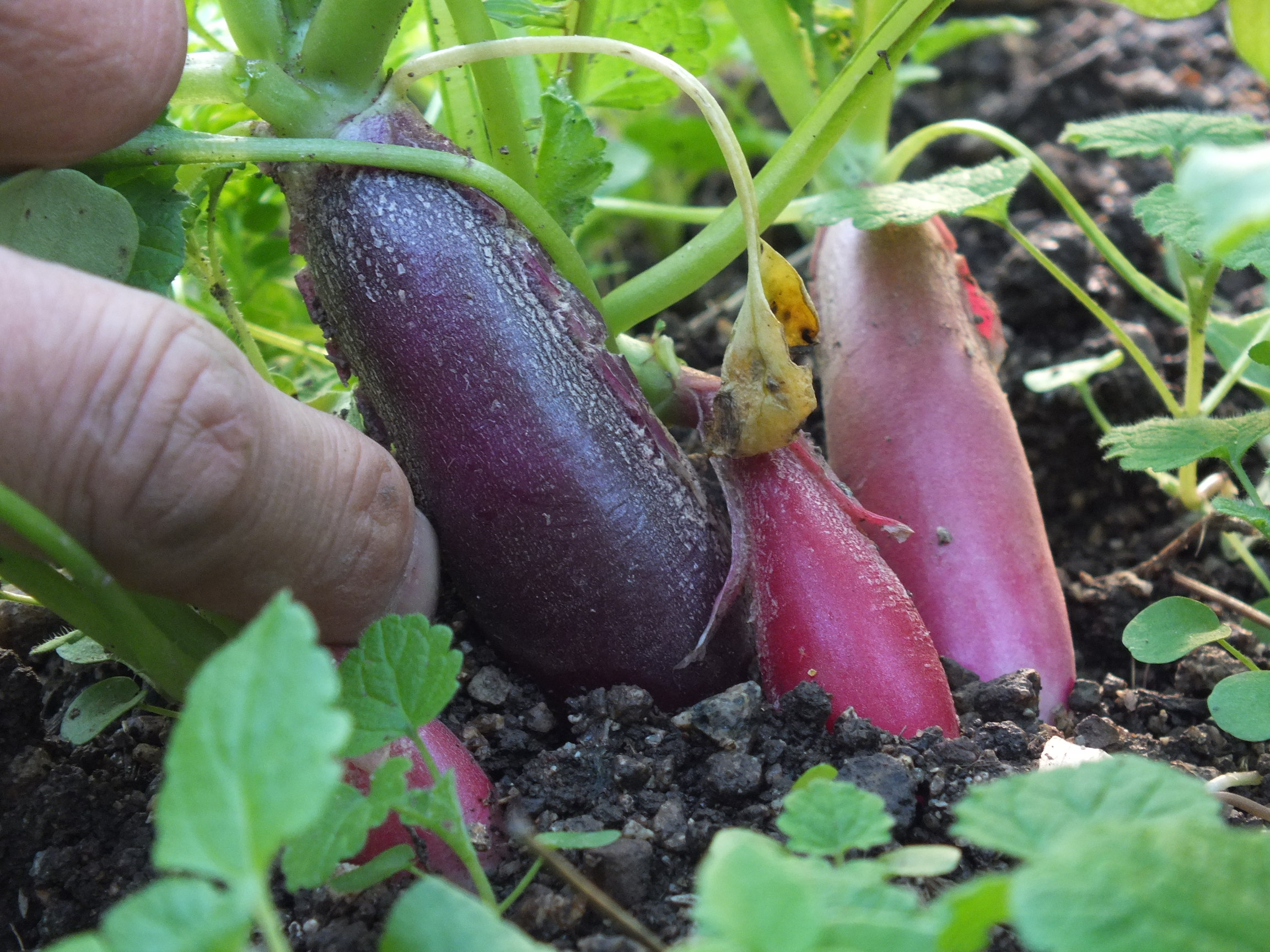
Hatsukadaikon (廿日大根)

== Varieties ==
The most common variety in Japan (aokubi-daikon) produces an elongated root in the shape of a giant white carrot about 20 to 35 cm (8 to 14 in) long and 5 to 10 cm (2 to 4 in) in diameter. Most Chinese and Indian forms are roughly similar.

The turnip-shaped giant white radish or Sakurajima radish is cultivated around Kagoshima in Japan and grows as large as 50 cm (20 in) in diameter and 45 kg (100 lb) in mass.
