= Asazuke =

Japanese pickling method

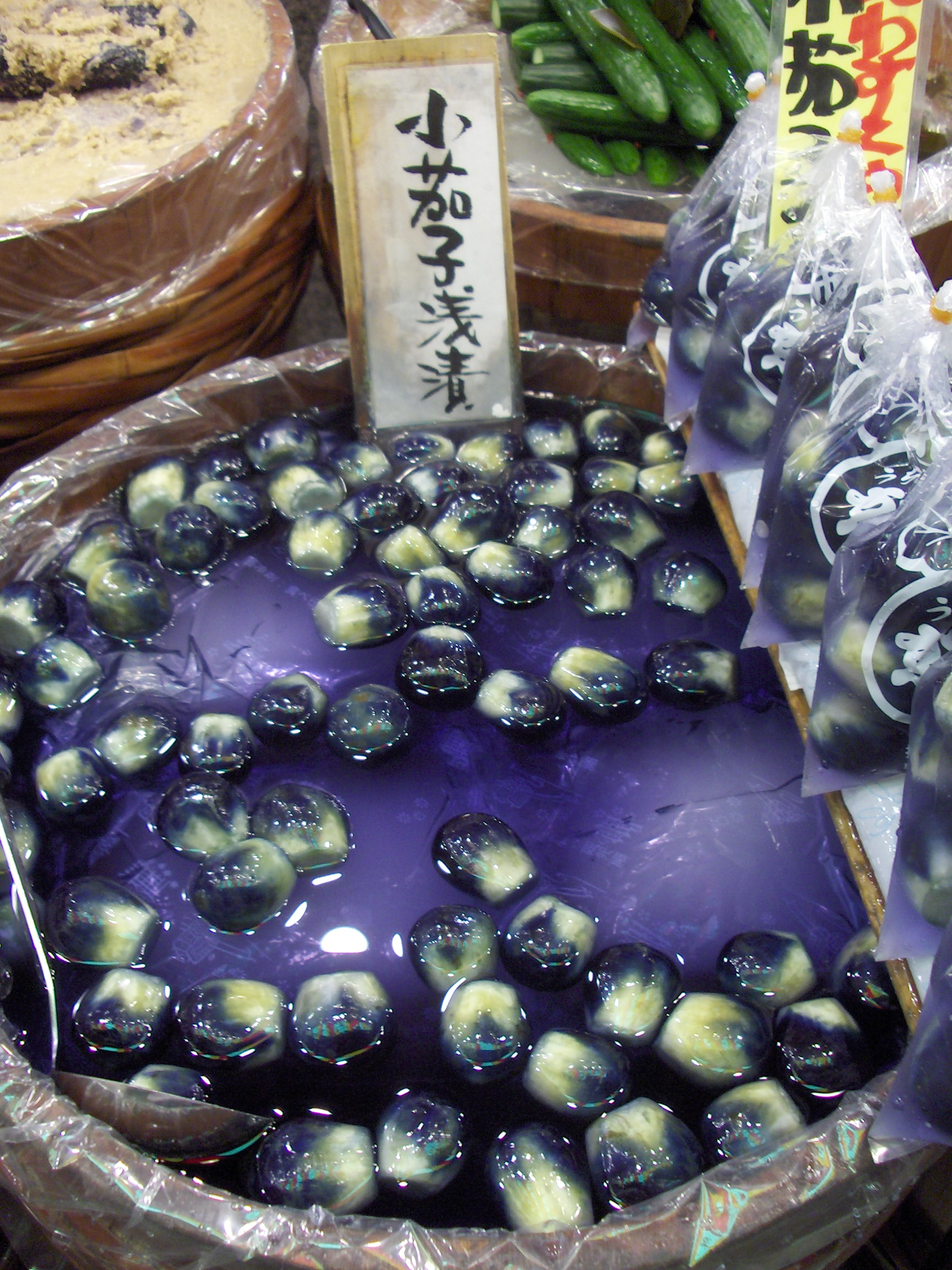
- Baby eggplant asazuke
- Type: Tsukemono
- Place of origin: Japan
- Associated cuisine: Japanese cuisine
- Main ingredients: Vegetables, vinegar, salt

Asazuke (浅漬け) (literally: shallow pickle) is a Japanese pickling method characterized by its short preparation time. The name implies a food pickled in the morning and ready by the evening. The word asazuke can also refer to the items pickled in this manner. Asazuke is a sub-category of tsukemono, which includes all types of pickles. Asazuke has become a very popular method of pickling in Japanese households due to its ease of preparation.

== Preparation ==
Because of its short preparation time, asazuke generally lacks the pungency created by other, more lengthy pickling methods but retains more of the fresh taste of the vegetable. Commonly used vegetables include daikon, hakusai, cucumbers, or eggplant. Kimuchi, much like the similarly named Korean kimchi, is a cabbage asazuke but milder in flavor.

Asazuke is usually prepared by rubbing the cut vegetables with salt and placing in a sealed bag or other sealed container along with such items as sliced kombu or chili peppers. Instead of salt, asazuke can also be prepared with vinegar, nuka, or a pickling solution that is sold in stores. Sufficient pickling times range anywhere from 30 minutes to several hours.

== Gallery ==
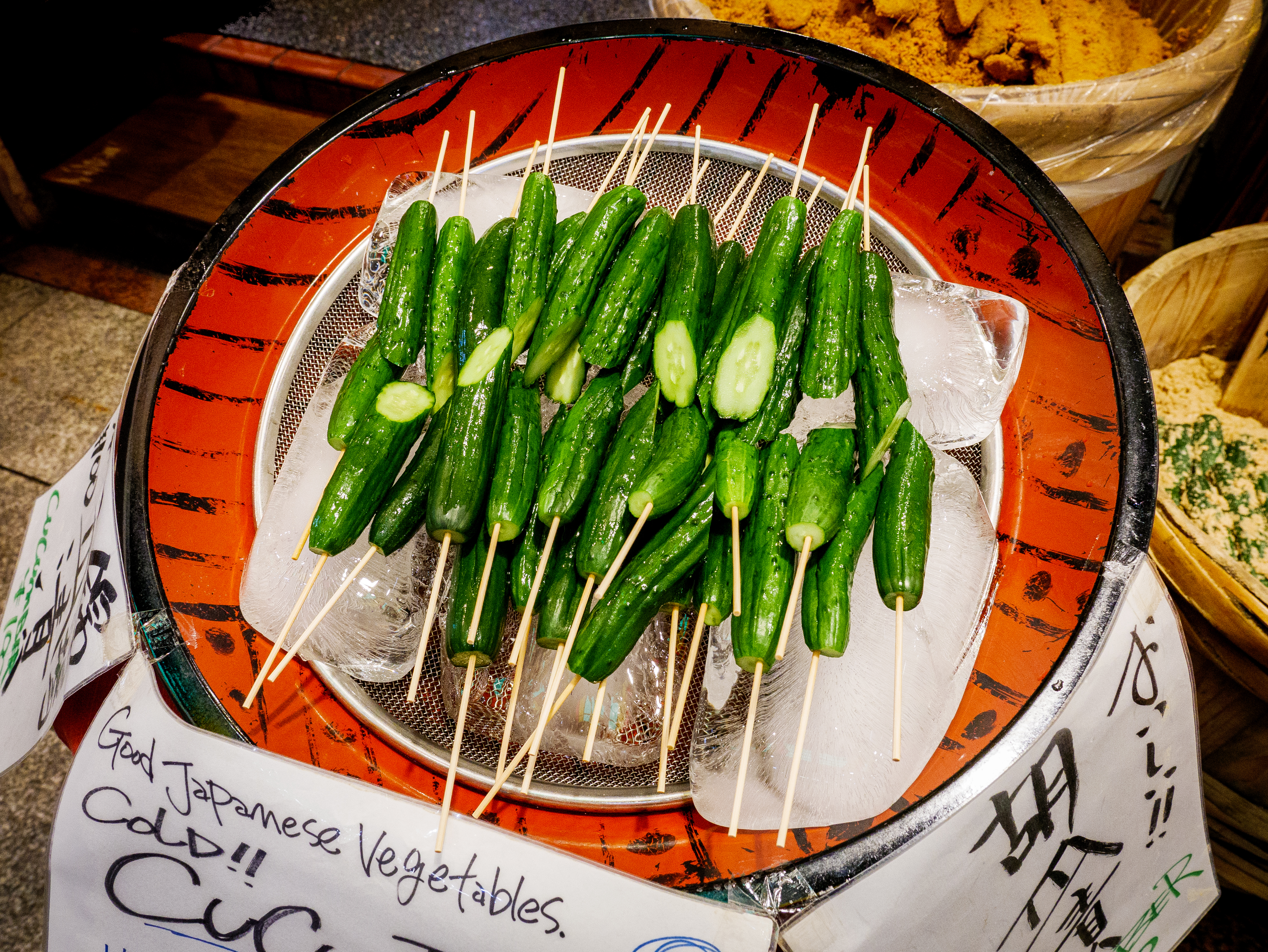
Cucumber pickles on skewers

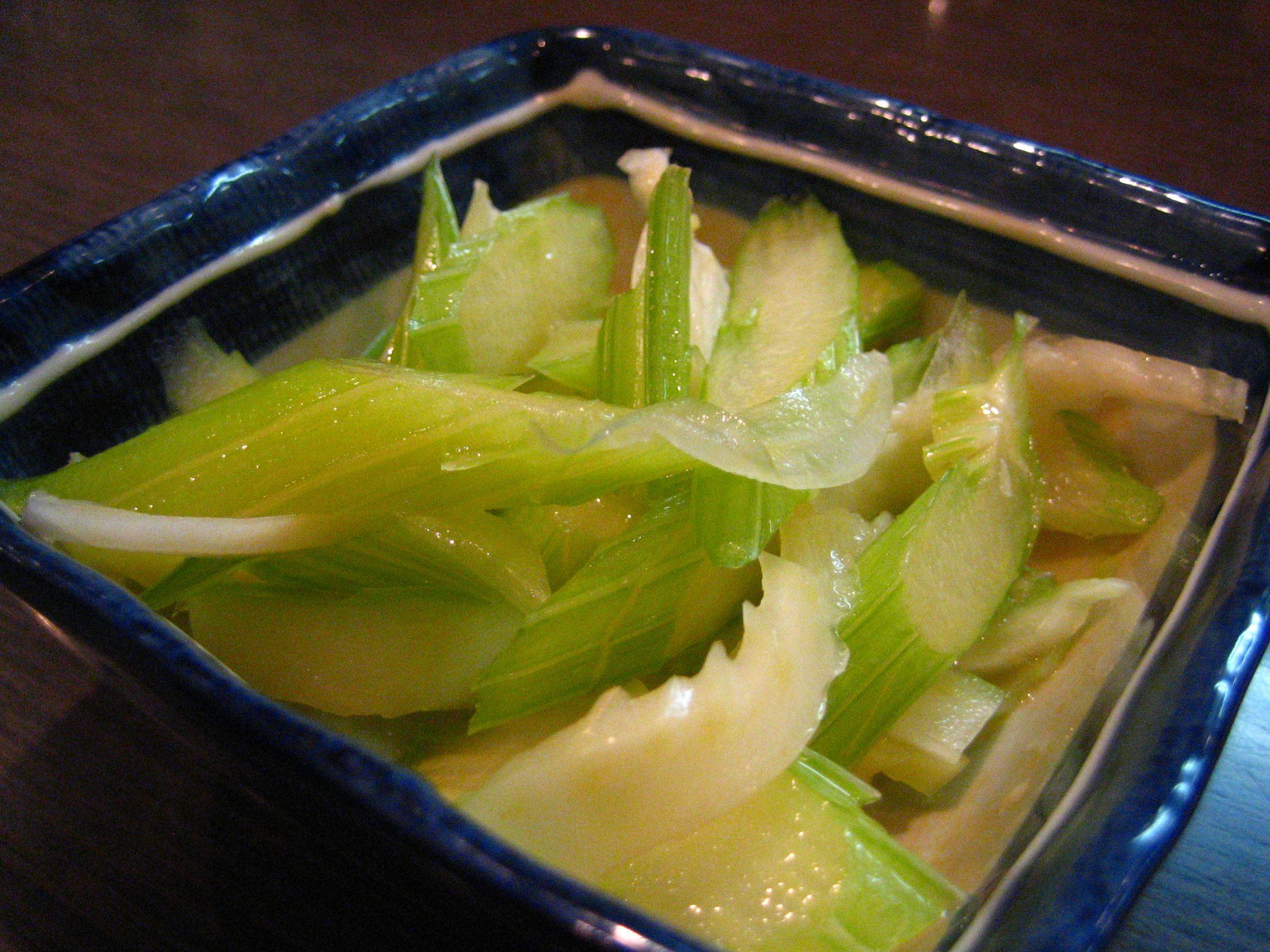
Celery pickles

== See also ==
- Japanese cuisine
