= Bettarazuke =

Type of pickled daikon popular in Tokyo

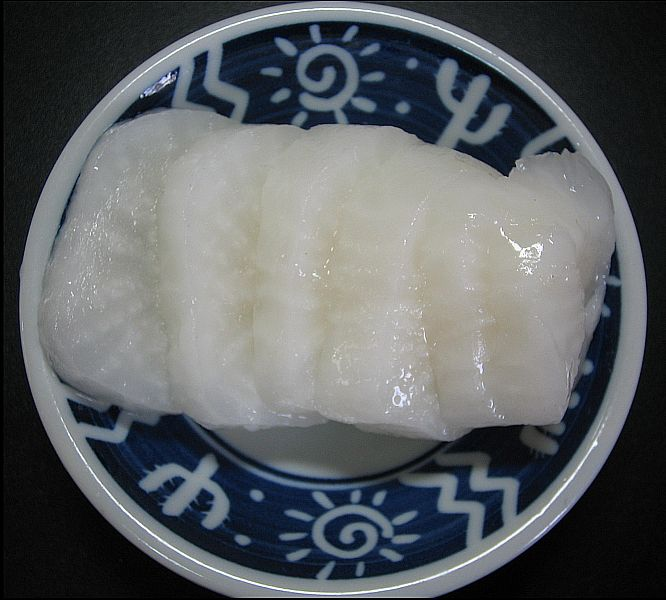
- Sliced bettarazuke
- Place of origin: Japan
- Serving temperature: Side dish
- Main ingredients: Daikon

Bettarazuke (べったら漬) is a type of pickled daikon popular in Tokyo, a sort of tsukemono. It is made by pickling daikon with sugar, salt, and sake without filtering koji. The name bettarazuke is taken from the stickiness of koji left over from the pickling process. Bettarazuke has a crisp sweet taste. Bettarazuke has similar figure to takuan, but bettarazuke contains a lot of moisture because it doesn't need sun-drying process.

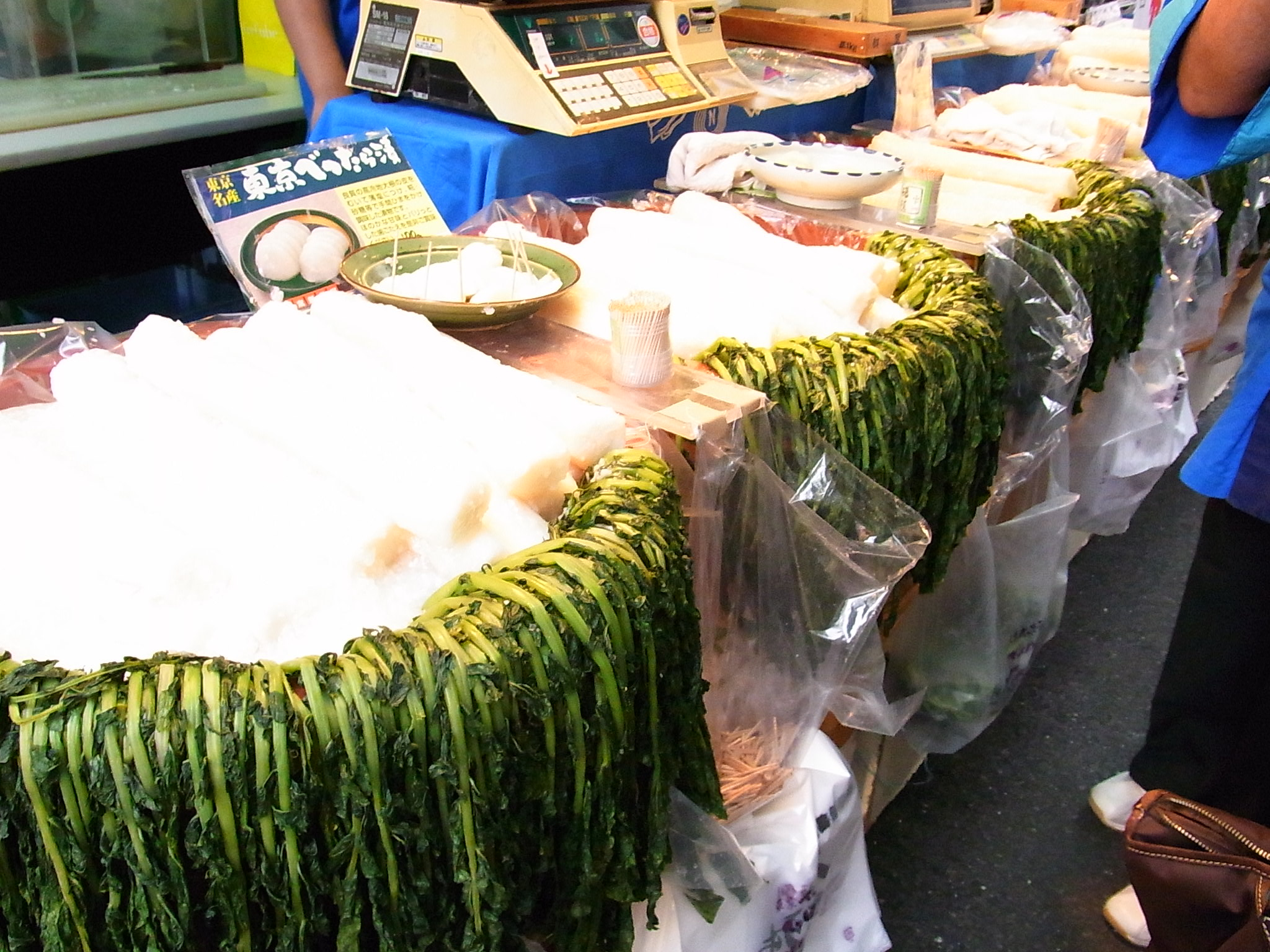
Daikon radishes being pickled

On the night of every October 19 in the area around Takarada Ebisu shrine, Bettara Ichi (literally, "bettara fair") is held to sell the year's freshly pickled bettarazuke.
