= Nerima daikon =

Nerima daikon (練馬大根) is a variety of daikon that originated in Nerima Ward, Tokyo, and is a designated specialty product of the area. The local Kanto loam soil is particularly suitable for its cultivation.

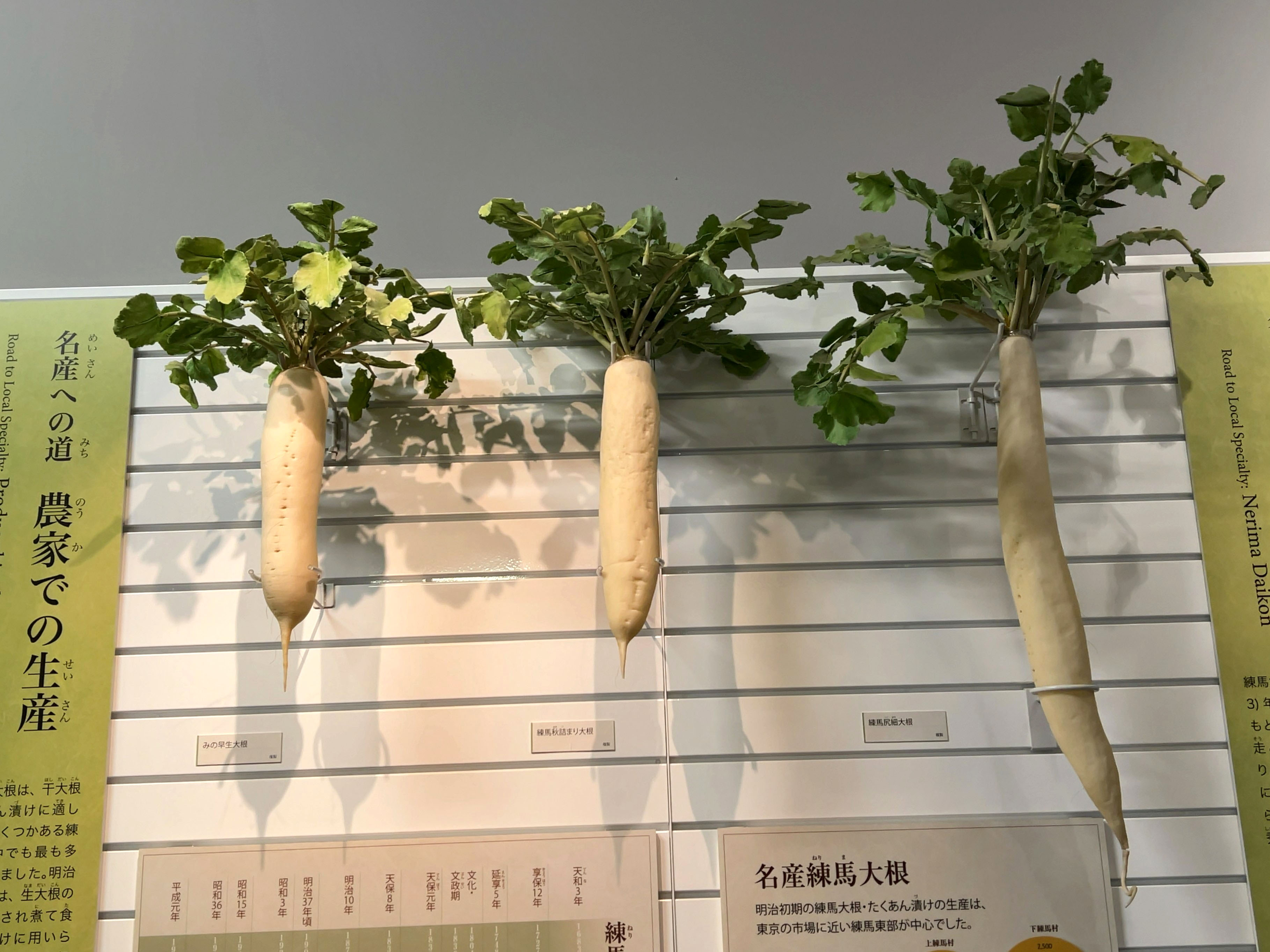
Nerima daikon replica.

Due to its shape, the Nerima daikon is famously difficult to pull from the ground. This characteristic is the basis for the Nerima Daikon Pulling Contest, organized by JA Tokyo Aoba, where participants compete in the number and length of daikons harvested. Some of the crop grown under contract with the ward is processed into takuan (pickled radish) and sold under the name Nerima Honboshi Takuan. As part of local production and consumption initiatives, elementary schools in Nerima Ward serve Nerima Spaghetti, a school lunch menu featuring a grated Nerima daikon topping.

== History ==
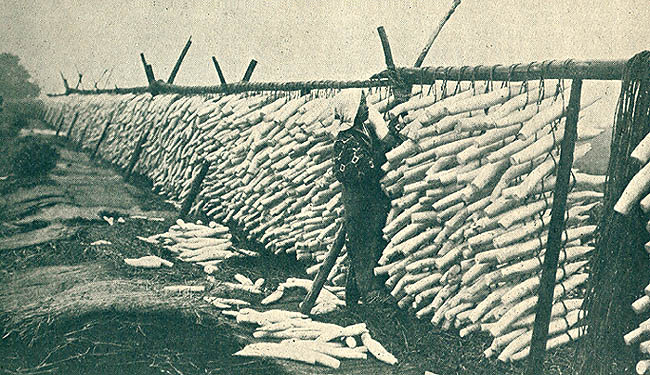
Farmer cultivating Nerima daikon in Tokyo City (Winter, c. 1935)

The earliest documented reference of Nerima daikon is from the 1683 geography book Murasaki-no-Hitomoto (『紫の一本』) edited by Toda Mosui. One of the legends about its origin is related to Tokugawa Tsunayoshi, the 5th shogun of the Edo shogunate, who built a villa in the village of Shimo-Nerima before becoming shogun, and brought seeds of Miyashige daikon from Owari Domain to a vacant lot within the villa and cultivated them. Another legend is that the area became the leading daikon producing area thanks to the efforts of Mataroku, a diligent farmer in Kami-Nerima.

In the Honchō Shokukagami, published in 1697, daikons are listed in "Volume 3, Vegetable Section, Nineteen Kinds of Pungent Vegetables," and it states, "Many of the finest radishes are grown in the rural areas near Edo. Among them, those from Neri, Itabashi, and Urawa are the best."
