= Tsukemono =

Japanese preserved vegetables

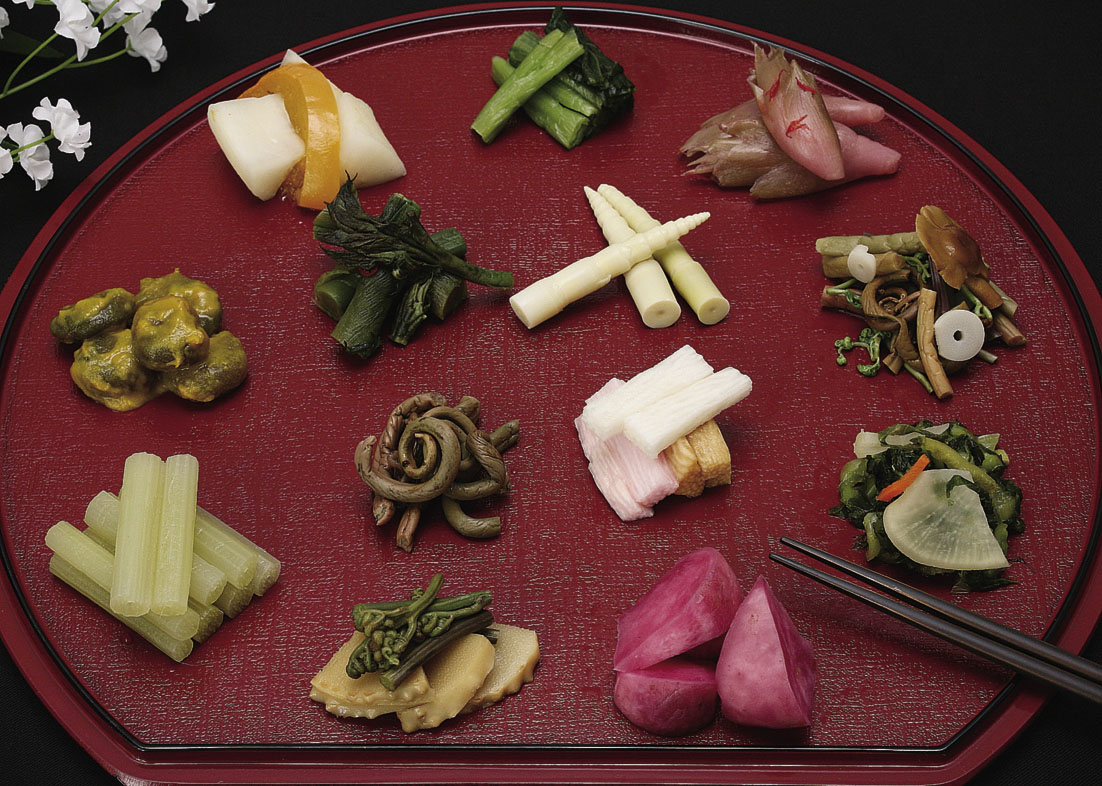
An assortment of tsukemono

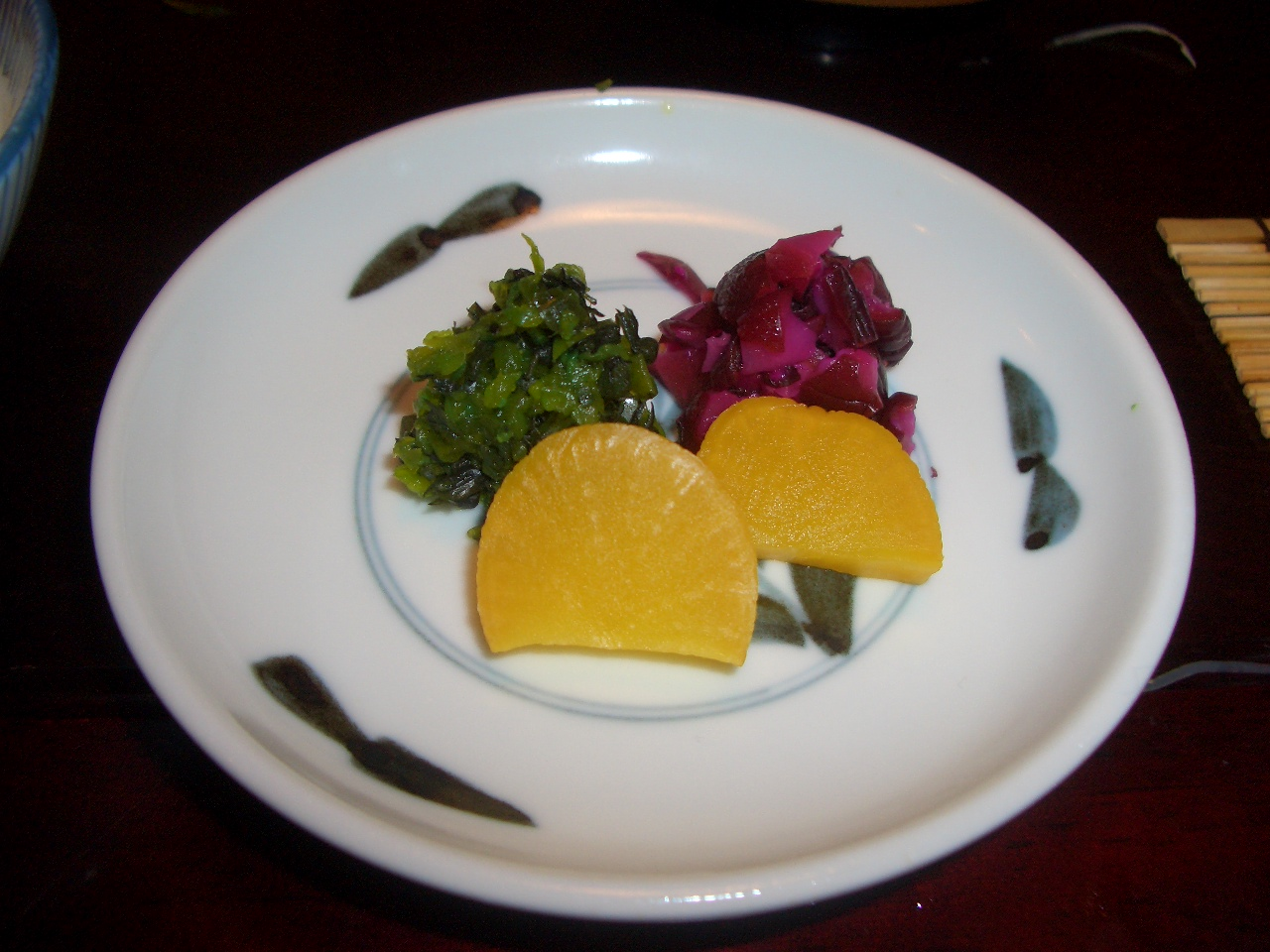
Assorted tsukemono

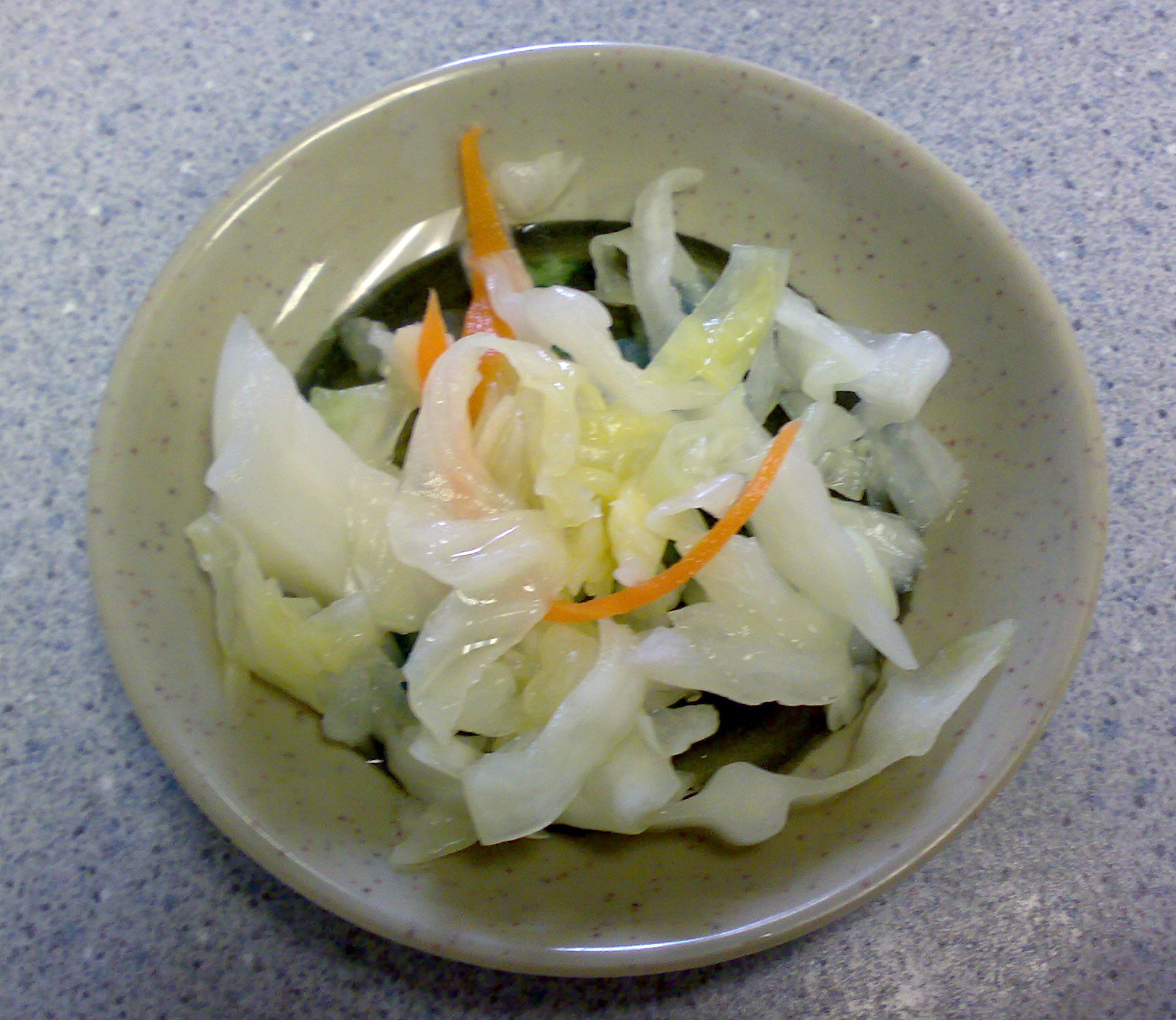
A dish of tsukemono

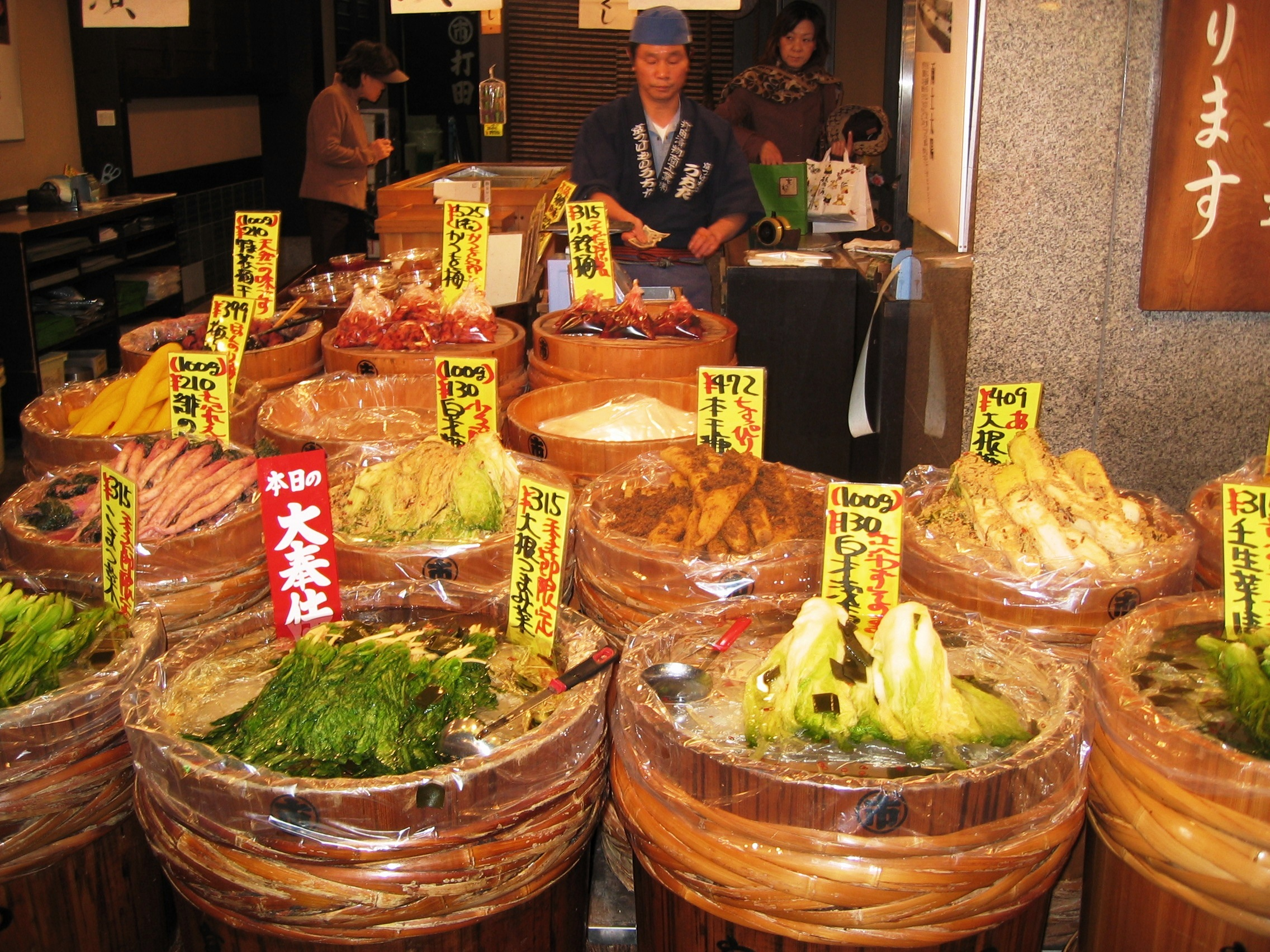
Tsukemono shop in Nishiki Ichiba, Kyoto

Tsukemono, oshinko or konomono (漬物; "pickled things") are Japanese preserved vegetables (usually pickled in salt, brine, or a bed of rice bran). They are served with rice as an okazu (side dish), with drinks as an otsumami (snack), as an accompaniment to or garnish for meals, and as a course in the kaiseki portion of a Japanese tea ceremony.

== Alternative names ==
Tsukemono are also referred to as konomono (香の物), oshinko (御新香), or okōkō (御香々), all carrying the meaning of "fragrant dish" in Japanese. The ko or kō (香) portion in these names means "fragrant", and the term was used as a nyōbō kotoba or "woman's word" for miso in reference to the smell. Over time, this term was also applied to pickles, again for the smell. Oshinko ("fresh fragrance") more specifically referred to vegetables that had been only lightly pickled and that had not yet changed color very much. The term is now also used more broadly to refer to pickles in general.

== Making tsukemono ==
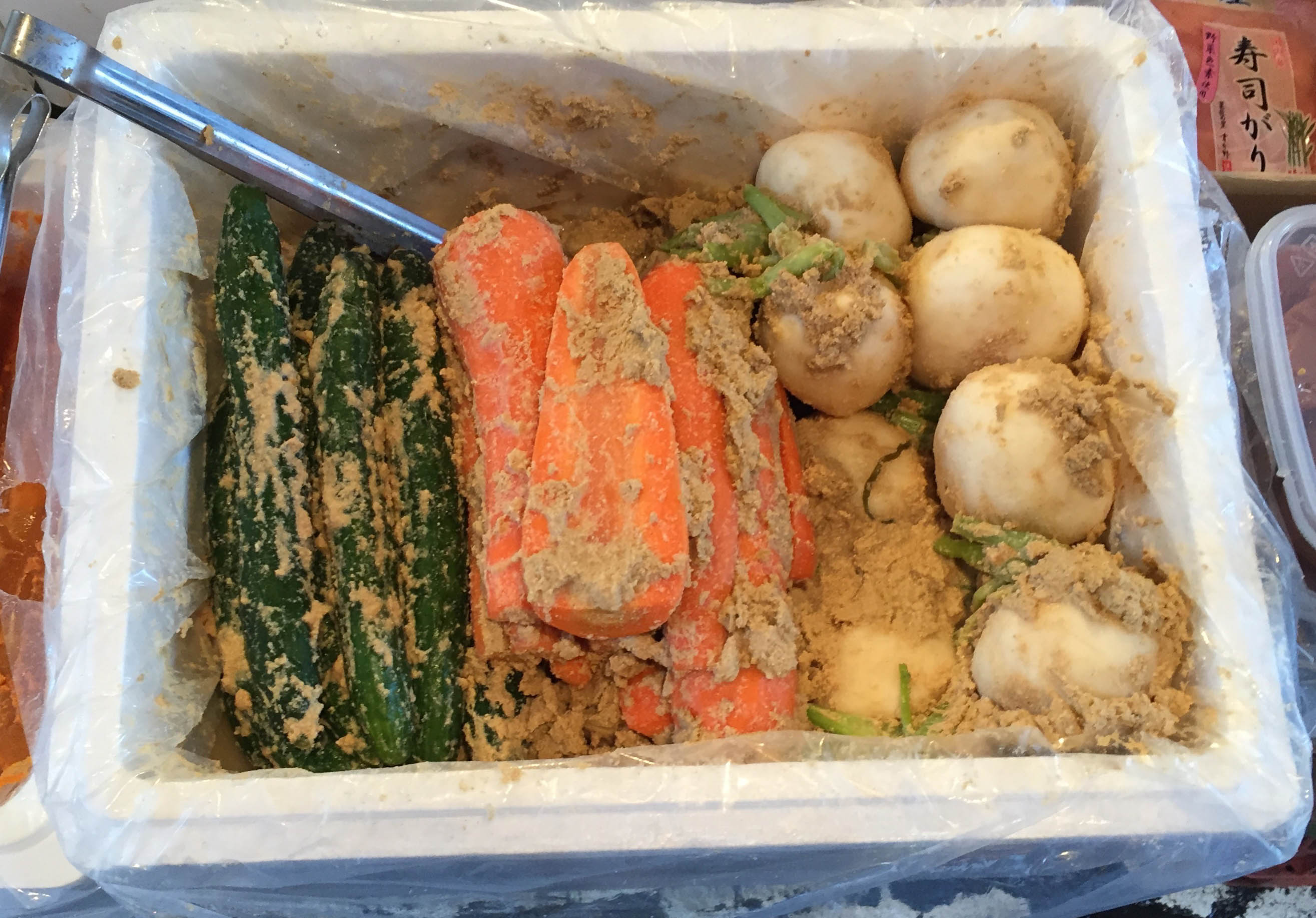
Tsukemono fermenting in rice bran

To make tsukemono, one needs a container, salt, and something to apply downward pressure on top of the pickles.

A tsukemonoki (漬物器) ("pickling container") is a Japanese pickle press. The pressure is generated by heavy stones called tsukemono ishi (漬物石) ("pickle stone") with a weight of one to two kilograms, sometimes more. This type of pickle press is still in use, and can be made from a variety of materials, such as plastic, wood, glass, or ceramic. Before tsukemono ishi came into use, the pressure was applied by driving a wedge between the handle of the container and its lid.

The weights are either stone or metal, with a handle on top and often covered with a layer of food-neutral plastic. Another modern type of pickle press is usually made from plastic, and the necessary pressure is generated by turning a screw and clamping down onto the pickles.

Asazuke is a pickling method characterized by its short preparation time.

Tsukemono types
Type	Kanji	Pickling ingredient
Shiozuke	塩漬け	salt
Suzuke	酢漬け	vinegar
Amasuzuke	甘酢漬け	sugar and vinegar
Misozuke	味噌漬け	miso
Shoyuzuke	醤油漬け	soy sauce
Kasuzuke	粕漬け	sake kasu (sake lees)
Kojizuke	麹漬け	mold-cultured rice
Nukazuke	糠漬け	rice bran
Karashizuke	からし漬け	hot mustard
Satozuke	砂糖漬け	sugar

== Tsukemono types ==
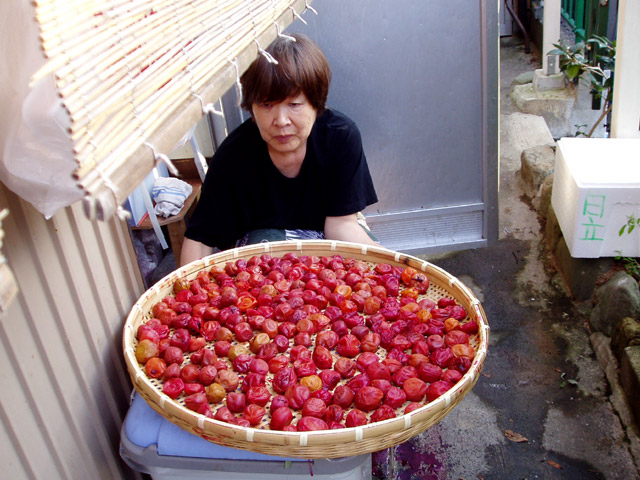
Umeboshi drying in the sun for home preparation

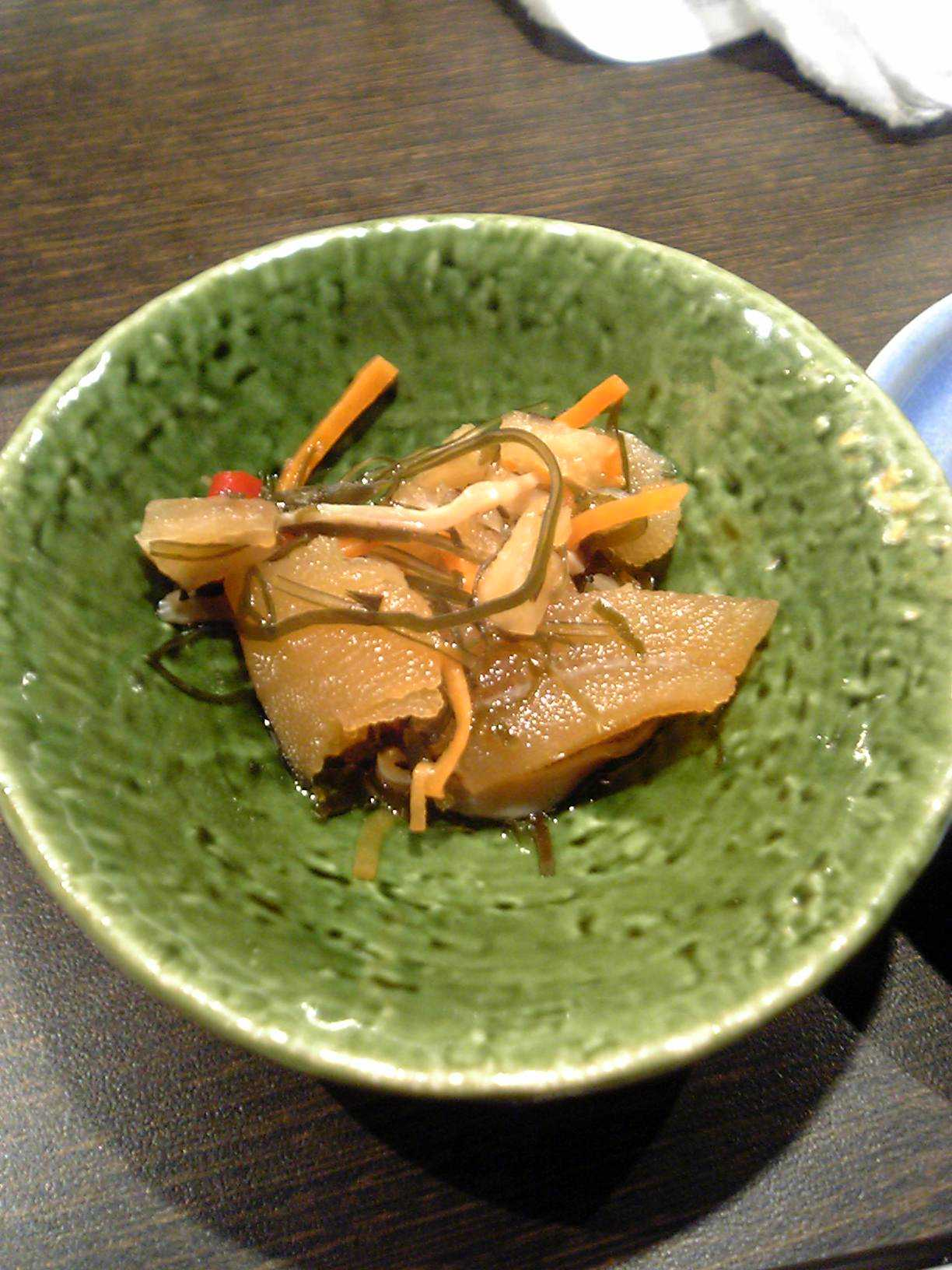
Matsumaezuke

Takuan (daikon), umeboshi (ume plum), turnip, cucumber, and Chinese cabbage are among the favorites to be eaten with rice as an accompaniment to a meal.

Beni shōga (red ginger pickled in umeboshi brine) is used as a garnish on okonomiyaki, takoyaki and yakisoba.

Gari (thinly sliced young ginger that has been marinated in a solution of sugar and vinegar) is used between dishes of sushi to cleanse the palate.

Rakkyōzuke (pickled rakkyō, a type of onion) is often served with Japanese curry. Rakkyōzuke is slightly acid and sweet, with a mild and "fresh" taste, due to being preserved in vinegar and mirin, which also remove its bitterness. It is used to balance the stronger flavors of some other components in a meal.

Fukujinzuke is a mixture of daikon, eggplant, lotus root and cucumber which is pickled and flavored with soy sauce.

Bettarazuke is a kind of pickled daikon popular in Tokyo.

Matsumaezuke is a pickled dish (native to Matsumae, Hokkaidō) made from surume (dried squid), konbu, kazunoko (herring roe), carrot and ginger with a mixture of sake, soy sauce and mirin.

Nozawana is a pickled leaf vegetable typical of Nagano Prefecture.

== Tsukemono tariffs ==
According to EU and US trade code definitions, tsukemono are classified as 'preserved vegetables' rather than 'pickles' because they are not primarily preserved in acetic acid or distilled vinegar. They have a different tax rate than Western pickles.

== See also ==
- List of Japanese cooking utensils
- Menma – Japanese condiment made from fermented bamboo shoots
- List of pickled foods
- Takuan – Pickled preparation of daikon radish
- Jangajji – Korean pickled vegetable dish
