= Nukazuke =

Japanese pickle made by fermenting vegetables in rice bran

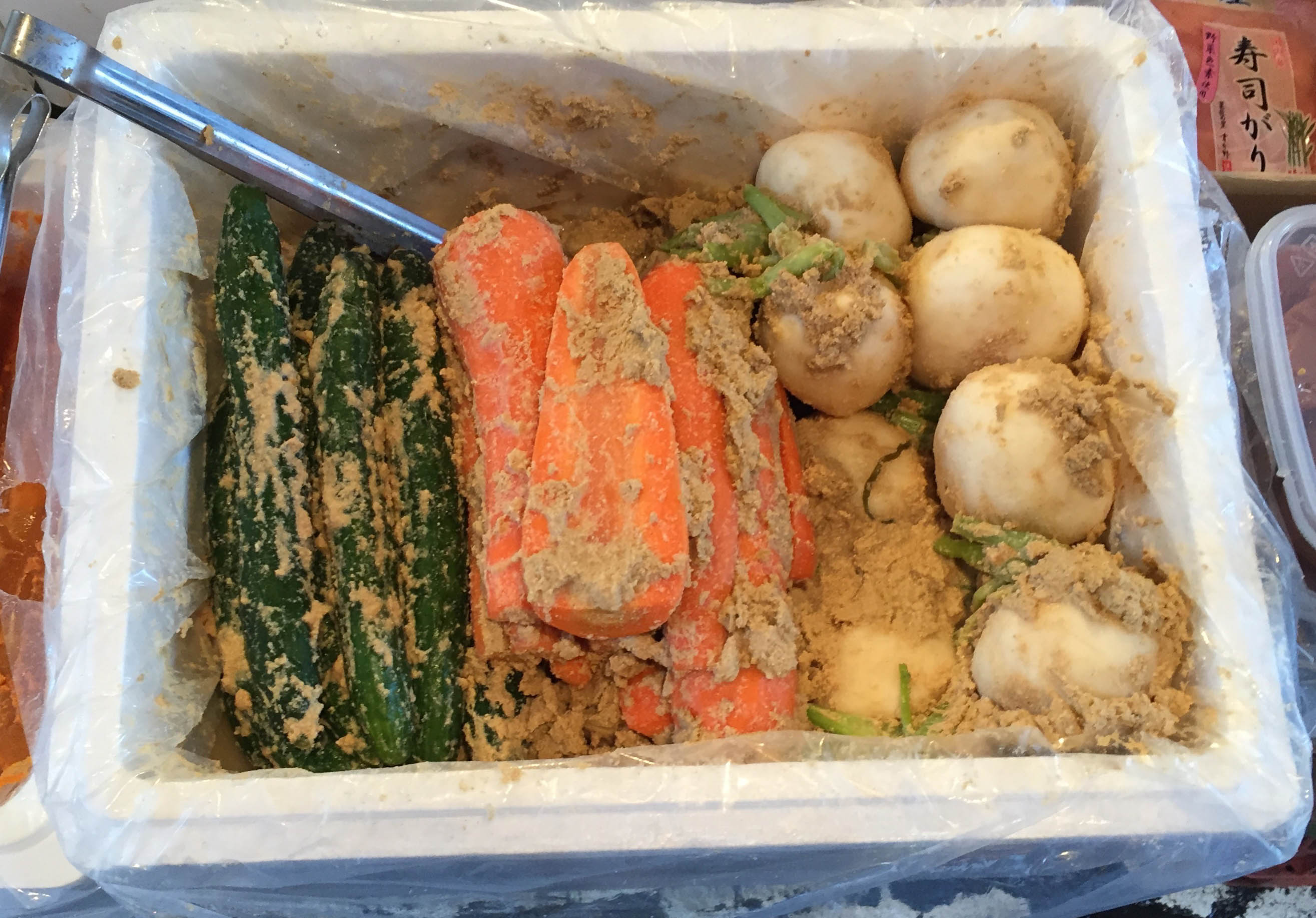
Nukazuke

Nukazuke (糠漬け) is a type of traditional Japanese preserved food, made by fermenting vegetables in rice bran (nuka), developed in the 17th century.

Almost any vegetable may be preserved using this technique, although some common varieties include celery, eggplants, daikon, cabbage, carrots, and cucumbers. The taste of nukazuke can vary from pleasantly tangy to very sour, salty and pungent, depending on the methods and recipe used or region, usually with a crispy, crunchy texture. Less common are fish nukazuke, found in the north part of Japan, using sardine, mackerel, puffer fish roe, or Japanese horse mackerel.

Pickles are an important part of Japanese diet, often eaten at the end of a meal and are said to aid in digestion. The lactic acid bacteria in nukazuke are probiotics that aid the intestinal flora. These bacteria are also responsible for producing folate and vitamin B_{12} in nukazuke. Further, since nukazuke absorb nutrients from the rice bran, they are high in vitamin B_{1}, which helped prevent beri-beri in 17th century Edo (present-day Tokyo).

Traditionally, Japanese cedar tubs (oke) were used for fermenting pickles; today, ceramic or plastic containers are more common.

== Preparation ==
Nukazuke involves a traditional style of pickling using a mash made of dry rice bran and brine. Vegetables that are often used are cucumbers, daikon, eggplant, carrot and turnips. These are completely buried in the mash and can be left for one day (for a quick pickle) or for five or more days to enrich the flavor, although the mash and vegetables must be turned every day. Traditionally, this is done with the bare hands.

Rice bran is first mixed in a crock with salt, kombu seaweed, and water. Additional ingredients—like ginger, beer, sake, chiles, garlic, persimmon or apple peels, or powdered mustard seed—may be added as well. These ingredients contribute to the unique flavor of the nukazuke, but also help start fermentation and prevent the growth of unwanted microorganisms.

The resultant mash, called nukamiso or nukadoko, has a consistency comparable to wet sand or cooked grits. Unless an established nuka sample is used to seed a fresh batch, the ubiquitous lactic acid-producing colonies crucial to the fermentation process must come from sources such as the skin of the starter vegetables or from human hands. Vegetable scraps, apple peels, or persimmon peels are added to the nuka-bed every day for at least a few days until a fermenting culture has been established. At this point, nuka-bed is ‘live,’ meaning that it contains a culture of active single-celled organisms, mostly lactobacilli and yeast. Although nukazuke can be made from scratch, a bit of well seasoned nuka from an older batch is often used to ‘seed’ a fresh batch.

When rice bran cannot be found, alternatives such as wheat bran or even cornflakes have been reported to work well.

The nuka-bed must be stirred well daily to keep it from becoming putrescent, moldy or infested with vermin. The acidity, salt content and oxygenation provided by daily stirring keeps toxic microbes from growing in the bed. It is universally recommended that this daily stirring be done with clean bare hands. Depending on the size of the container used, the nuka-bed could be stored temporarily in the fridge for up to two weeks, when daily stirring is not possible.

Once the fermenting cultures have been established, the nuka-bed usually develops a complex unique aroma that may be described as anything from "yeasty" to "earthy". At this point the starter vegetables (scraps, peels, etc.) are discarded and pickling vegetables are buried in the bed for as little as a few hours to as long as several months for very strong flavor. Some sources recommend a maximum pickling time of one month. Others suggest that pickles can be left for years in a well-kept nuka-bed. Unpleasant smells such as a "sour" or "stinky" aroma may indicate a problem with the nuka-bed.

Additional amounts of rice bran and salt are added from time to time, and some recommend discarding portions of the old nuka to make way for the new. Water is usually provided by the vegetables buried in the bed. With proper maintenance, nuka-beds can be kept indefinitely and are often passed down from generation to generation. Old nuka-beds are valued for their nuanced flavor.

Because the process depends on colonies of live organisms, flavors and smells can vary considerably from day to day and the fermenting process slows in colder weather.

When ready, nukazuke pickles are removed from the bed, washed in cool clean water, sliced and served as a side to savory meals.

Sometimes weights made of metal, stone or jugs of water are used the keep the nuka-bed under pressure, drawing water from the vegetables and speeding fermentation.

Nuka-beds are known to acquire subtle flavors from the surrounding environment and thus should not be stored in musty areas.

Takuan (pickled daikon) is also one variation of nukazuke. Traditional takuan uses sun-dried daikon, however, mass production takuan are often prepared with sugar to cut pickling time.

== See also ==
- Takuan – Pickled preparation of daikon radish
- Pickled radish – Radish dish served with Korean fried chicken
