= Takuan =

Pickled preparation of daikon radish

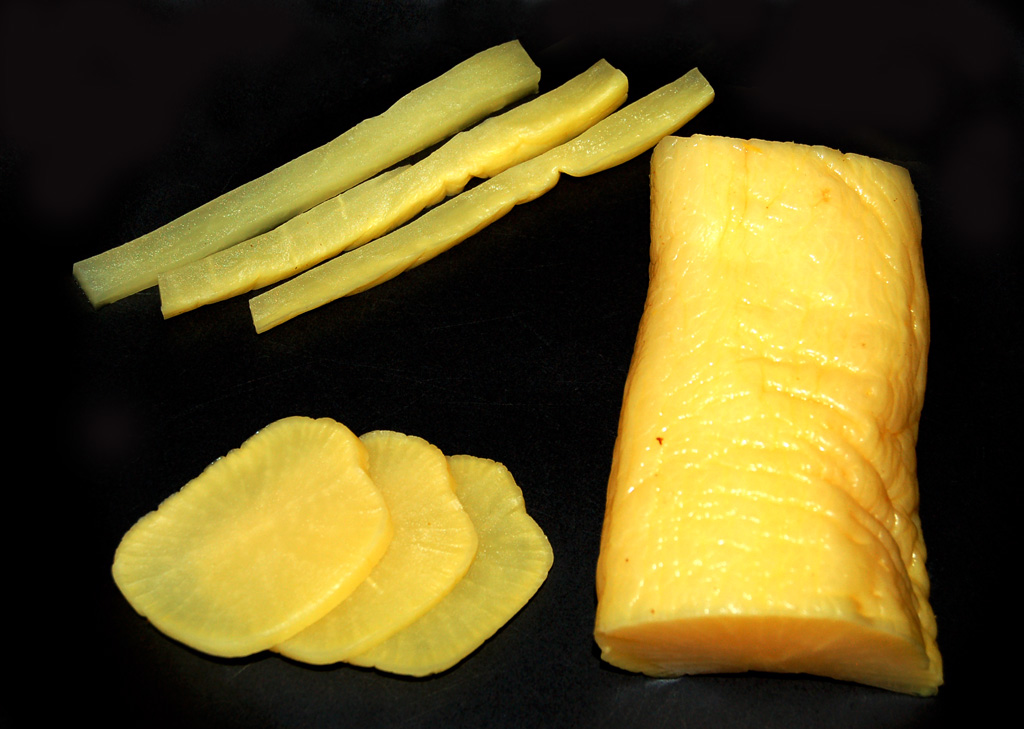
- Traditional takuan showing sliced preparation
- Type: Side dish
- Place of origin: Japan
- Serving temperature: Cold
- Main ingredients: Daikon

Takuan (Japanese: 沢庵; also spelled takuwan), or takuan-zuke (沢庵漬け; 'pickled takuan'), known as danmuji (단무지) in the context of Korean cuisine, is a pickled preparation of daikon radish. As a popular part of traditional Japanese cuisine, takuan is often served uncooked alongside other types of tsukemono ('pickled things'). It is also enjoyed at the end of meals to aid digestion.

== History ==
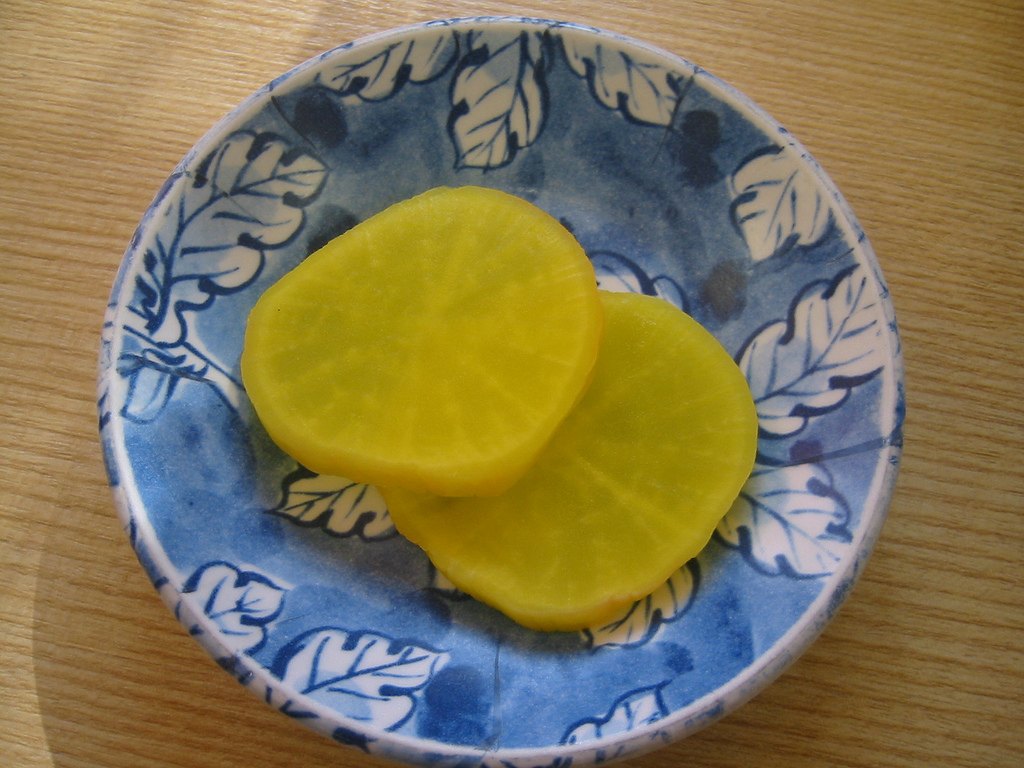
Takuan slices

In Japan, famous Buddhist monk Takuan Sōhō (1573–1645) is popularly credited with creating this yellow pickle, which now bears his name.

== Usage ==
Usually, takuan is washed with water to remove excess brine and then sliced thinly before serving. It is eaten as a side dish during meals, and eaten as a snack at teatime. Strip-cut takuan is often used for Japanese bento. Traditional takuan—using daikon radish that has been sun-dried and then pickled in a rice bran bed—is sometimes stir-fried or braised when getting older and sour. Some sushi rolls use strip-cut takuan for ingredients, e.g. shinkomaki (takuan only) and torotaku-maki (maguro [fatty tuna] and takuan).

=== In Korea ===
Takuan was brought to Korea during Japanese occupation and was initially known as dakkwang (다꽝), a phonetic rendering of takuan. After the end of the occupation, it was renamed as danmuji (단무지), meaning "sweet radish pickle".

Danmuji is a common banchan (side dish) served with bunsik (light meal or snack), as well as with Korean Chinese dishes. It is usually sweeter and crunchier than the Japanese original.

== Production ==
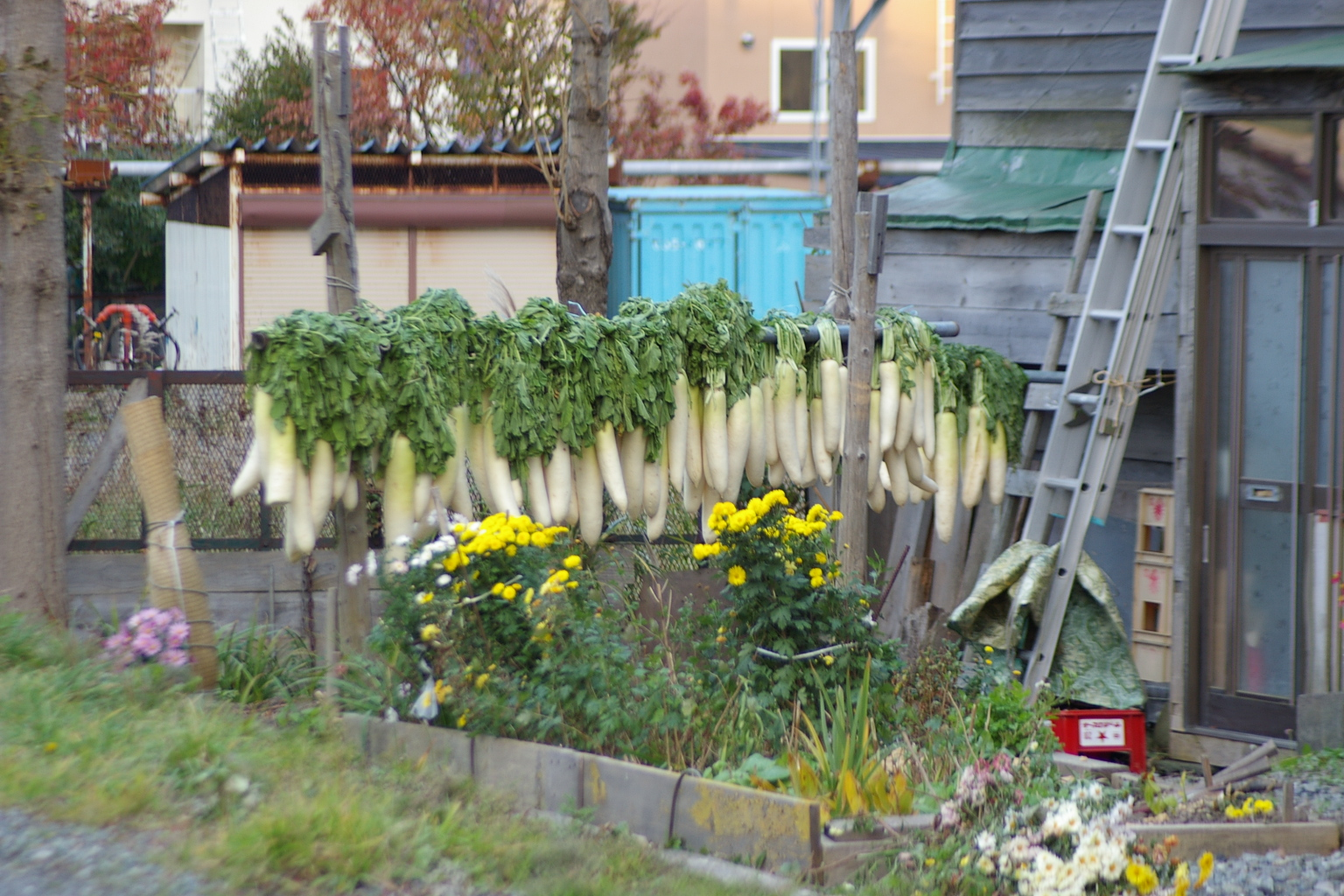
Drying radish on a farm in Japan

In the traditional process of making takuan, the first step is to hang a daikon radish in the sun for a few weeks by the leaves until it becomes dehydrated and flexible. Next, the daikon is placed in a pickling crock and covered with a mixture of salt, rice bran, optionally sugar, daikon greens, kombu, and perhaps chilli pepper and/or dried persimmon peels. A weight is then placed on top of the crock, and the daikon is allowed to pickle for several months. The finished takuan is usually yellow in color and quite pungent.

Most mass-produced takuan uses salt or syrup to reduce the dehydration time, and artificial color to enhance the appearance.

Iburi-gakko (いぶりがっこ), also known as iburizuke (いぶり漬け; lit. 'smoked pickle'), is a specialty of Akita Prefecture. It is smoked rather than sun-dried before pickling, originally above the hearth of the house. The pickle was granted geographical indication status in Japan in 2019.

== Gallery ==
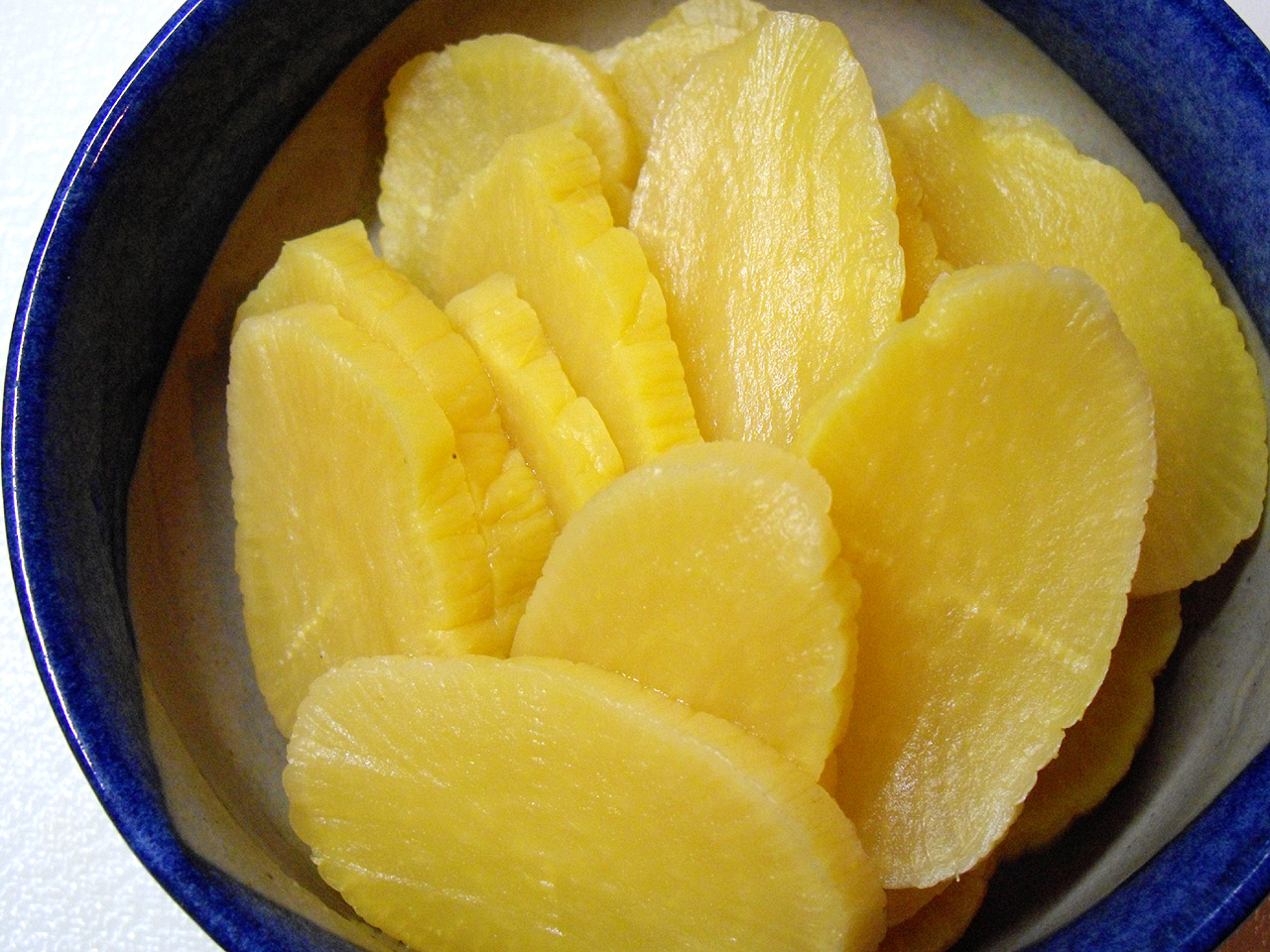
Sliced

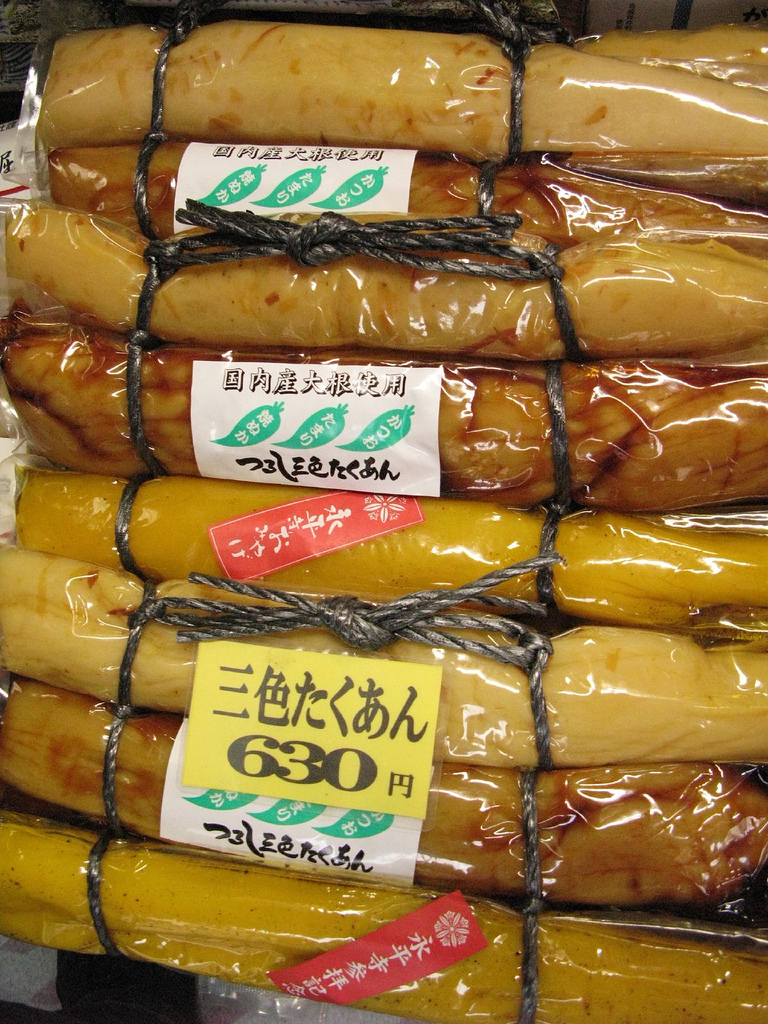
Whole

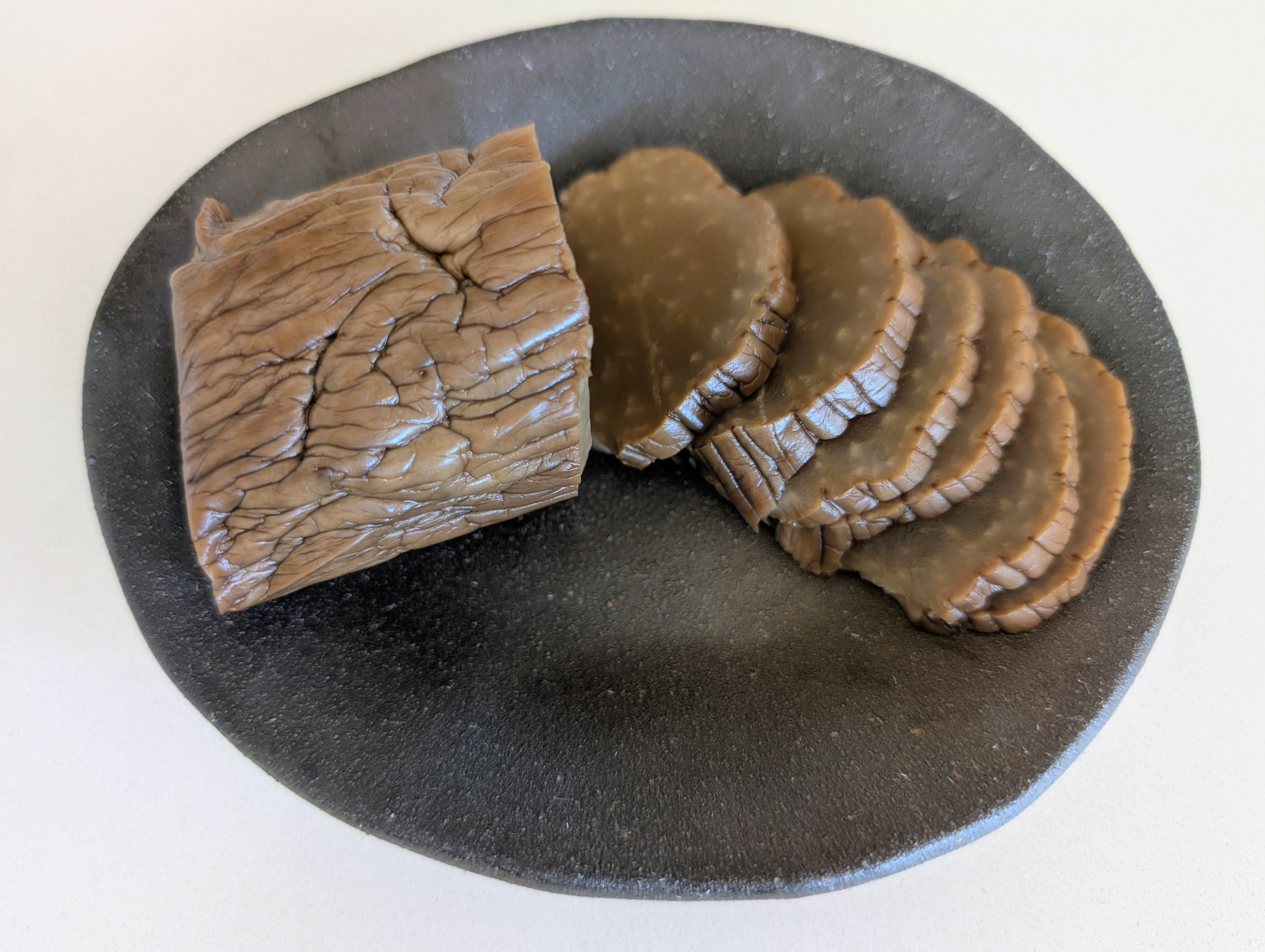
Slices of iburigakko, a smoked variety of takuan from Akita prefecture

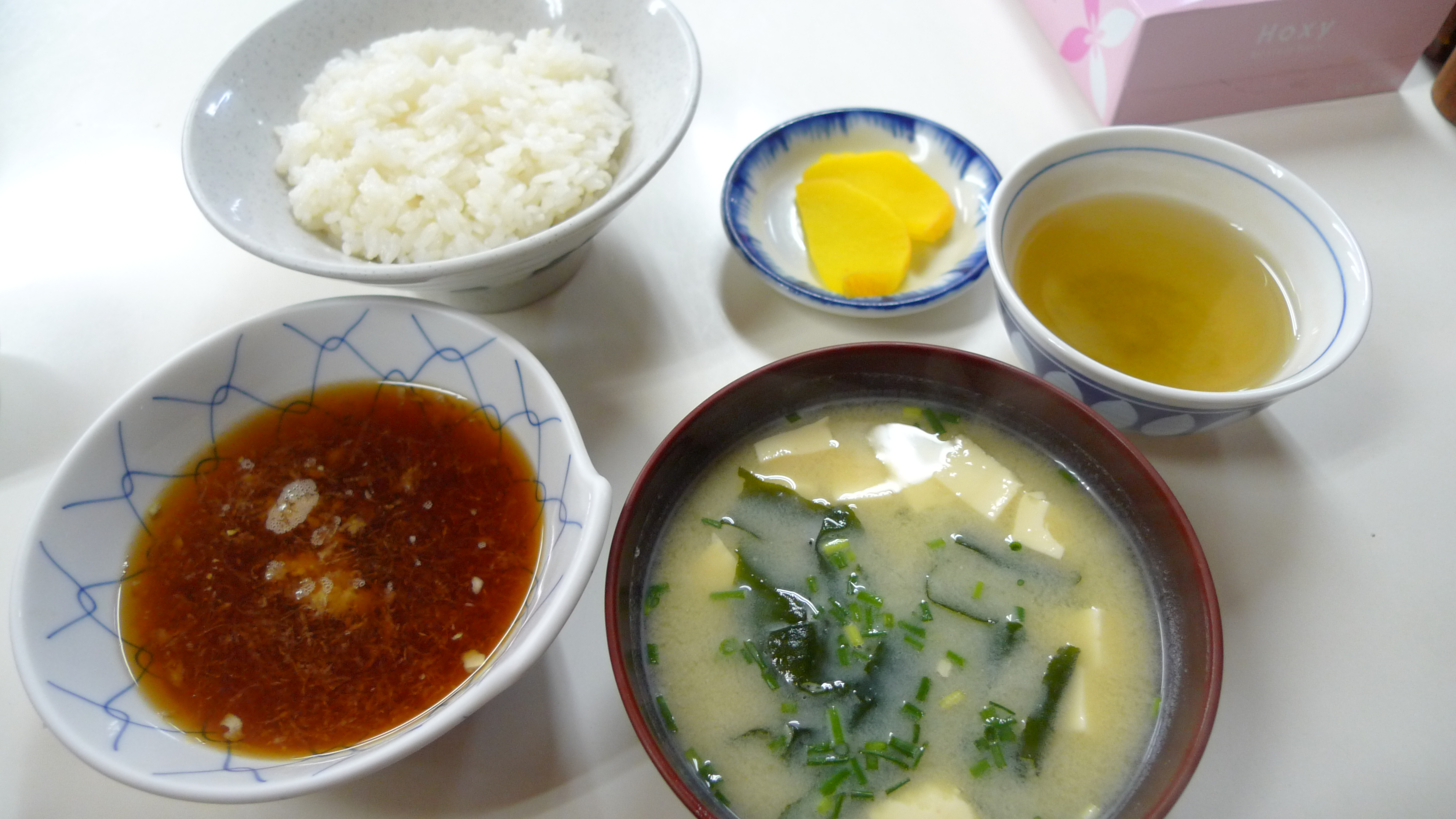
Rice and miso soup with takuan

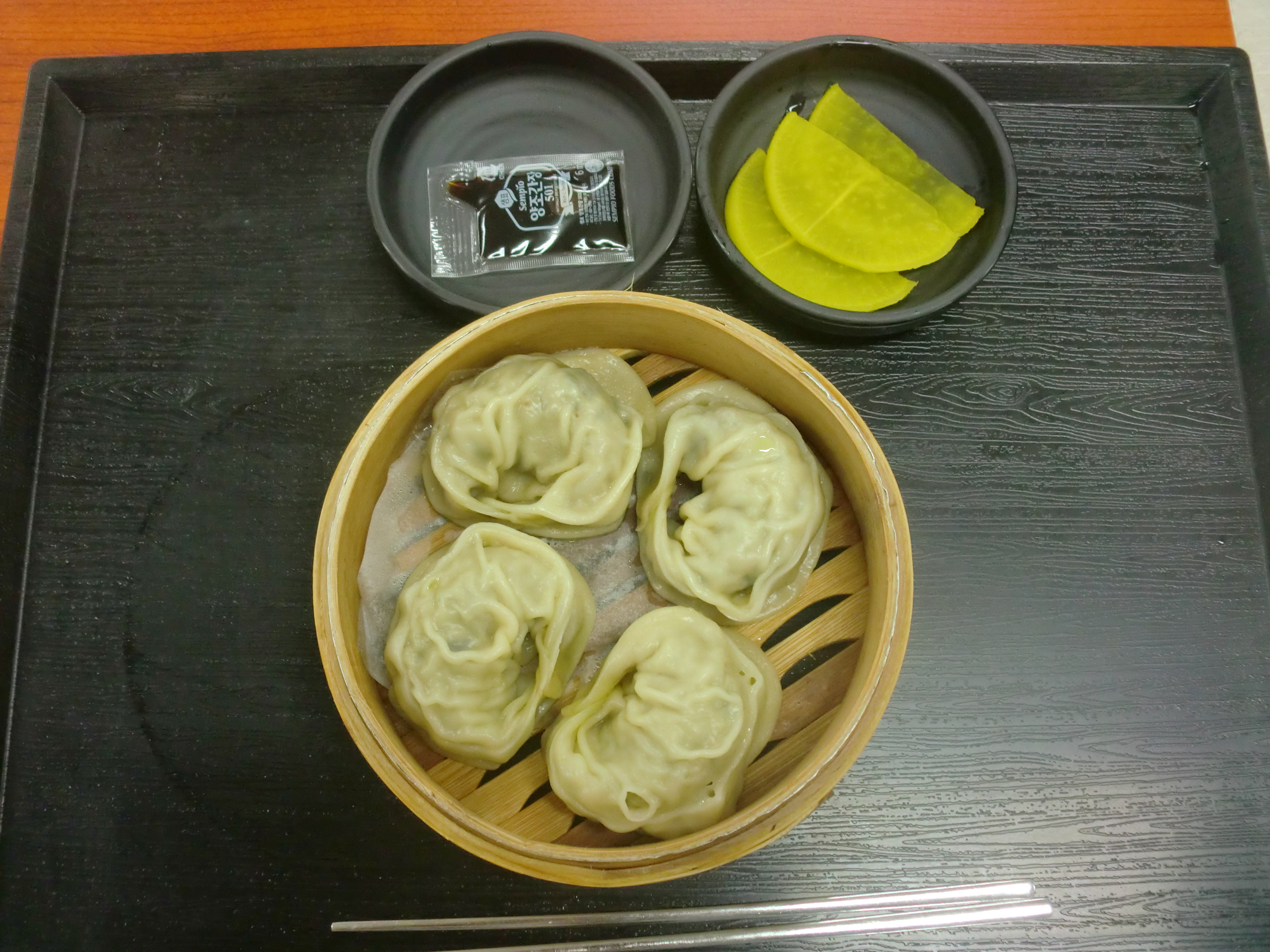
Korean dumplings with danmuji

== See also ==
- Nukazuke – Japanese pickle made by fermenting vegetables in rice bran
- Pickled radish – Radish dish served with Korean fried chicken
- List of foods named after people
- List of pickled foods
