= Daikon =

Subspecies of plant

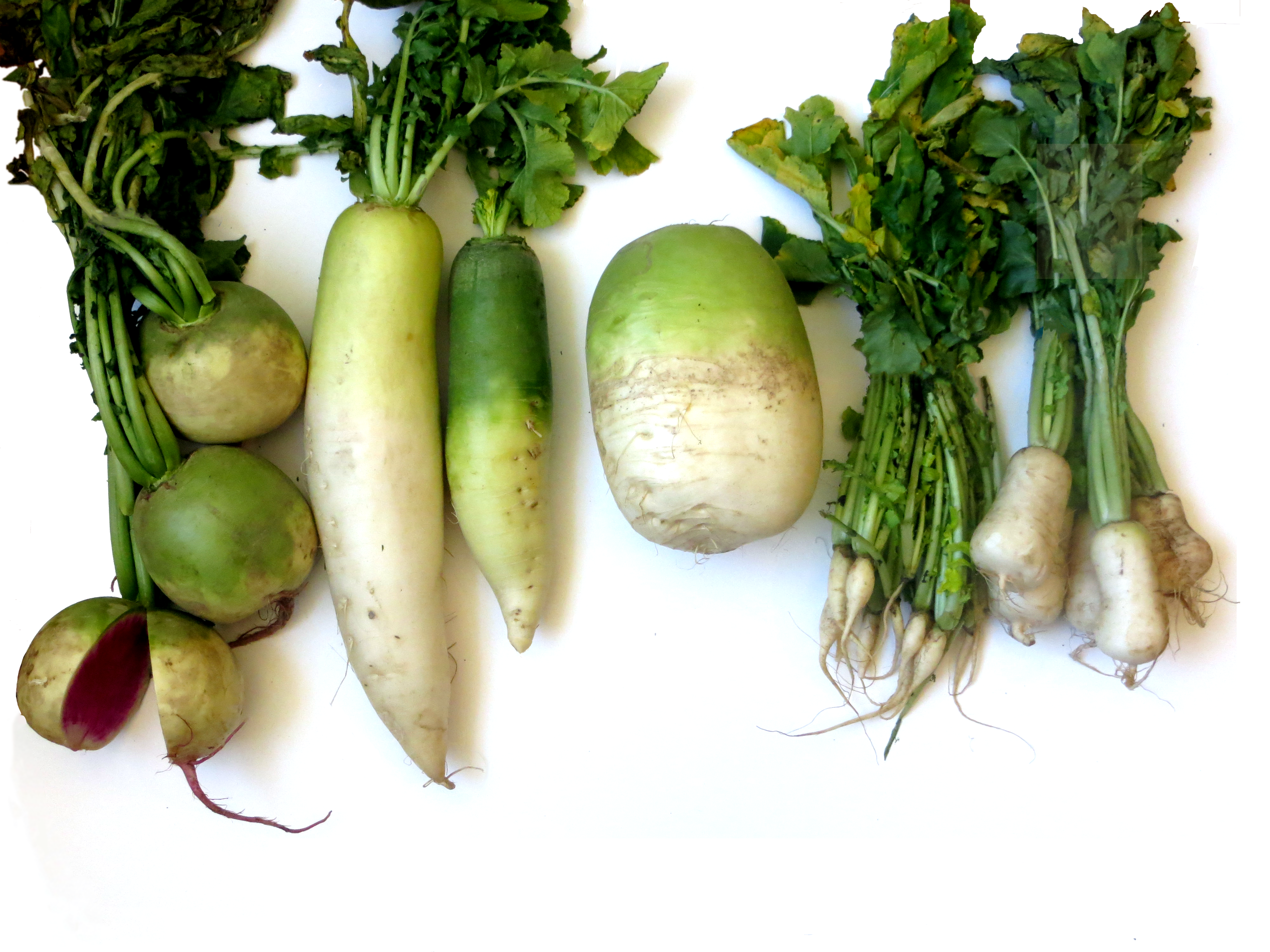
- From left to right: watermelon radish, daikon, bái luóbo, waemu, yeolmu, and ponytail radish
- Genus: Raphanus
- Species: Raphanus sativus
- Subspecies: R. sativus subsp. longipinnatus
- Cultivar group: White radish
- Origin: North China

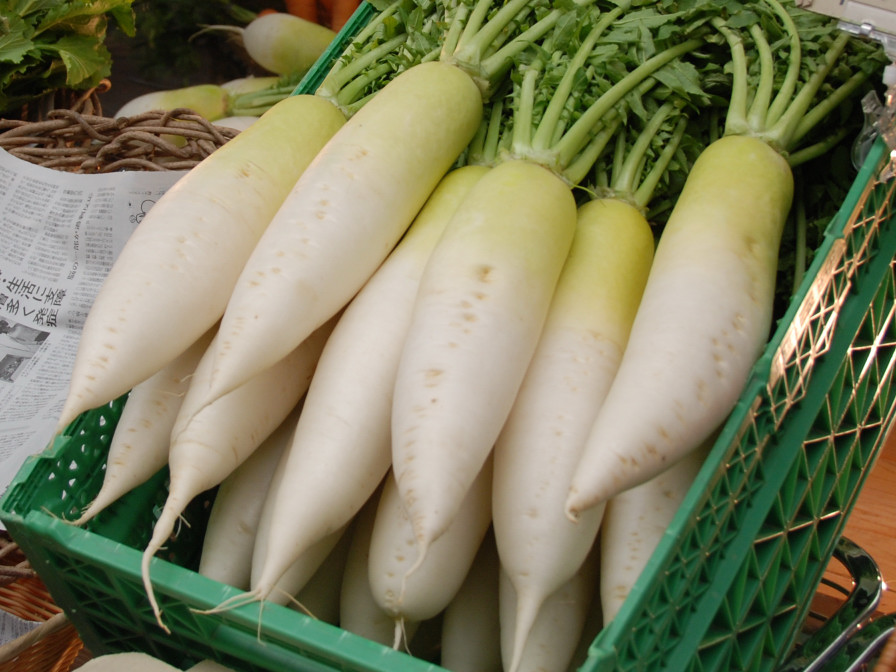
- Daikon sold in Nara, Japan

Chinese name
- Traditional Chinese: 白蘿蔔
- Simplified Chinese: 白萝卜
- Literal meaning: “white radish”
Transcriptions
Standard Mandarin
- Hanyu Pinyin: báiluóbo
- Wade–Giles: pai^{2}-lo^{2}-po^{5}
Wu
- Wugniu: baq^{8} lu^{2} boq^{8}, baq^{8} lau^{2} boq^{8}
- IPA: Shanghainese: [baʔ˩ lɔ˨ boʔ˨˧] Suzhounese: [bɑʔ˨ læ˧ boʔ] Ningbonese: [bɐʔ˨ ləu˥ boʔ˨˩]
Yue: Cantonese
- Jyutping: baak^{6} lo^{4} baak^{6}
- IPA: [pak̚˨.lɔ˩.pak̚˨]

Alternative Chinese name
- Traditional Chinese: 菜頭
- Simplified Chinese: 菜头
- Literal meaning: “vegetable head”
Transcriptions
Standard Mandarin
- Hanyu Pinyin: càitóu
Southern Min
- Hokkien POJ: chhài-thâu

Korean name
- Hangul: 왜무
- Literal meaning: Wae radish
Transcriptions
- Revised Romanization: waemu
- McCune–Reischauer: waemu

Japanese name
- Kanji: 大根
- Kana: だいこん
Transcriptions
- Romanization: daikon

Daikon or mooli (Raphanus sativus var. longipinnatus) is a mild-flavored winter radish usually characterized by fast-growing leaves and a long, white, napiform root. Native to continental East Asia, daikon and its cultivars are now harvested and consumed globally. In some locations, daikon is left unharvested to loosen compacted soils and recover nutrients.

== Names ==
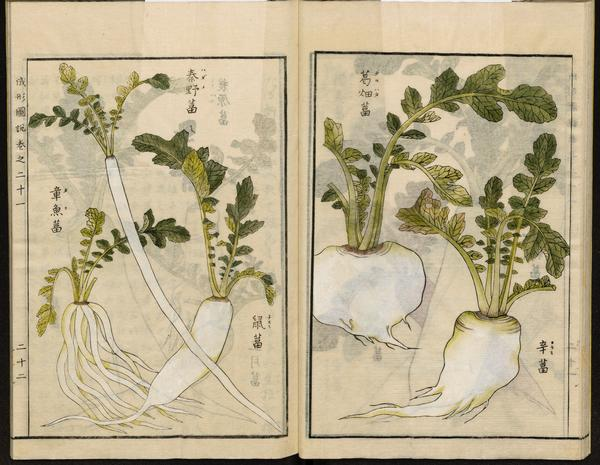
Varieties of Raphanus raphanistrum subsp. sativus from the Seikei Zusetsu agricultural encyclopedia, 1804

In culinary context, daikon (Japanese: 大根, lit. 'big root') or daikon radish is most common. Historical ties to South Asia give it the name mooli (Hindi: मूली, romanized: mūlī) in certain cultures. (Note: The Oxford English Dictionary, for instance, provides an entry for mooli, and only mentions daikon as its synonym in Japanese contexts.) Other terms include white radish, winter radish, Oriental radish, (Note: Larkcom and Douglass divide the term "oriental radish" into two categories, which they label "white mooli types" and "coloured types.") and long white radish, while still other names can be used. Other synonyms usually vary by region or describe regional varieties of the vegetable. When it is necessary to distinguish the usual Japanese form from others, it is sometimes known as Japanese radish.

The vegetable's Chinese names are still uncommon in English. In most forms of Chinese cuisine, it is usually known as white radish (simplified Chinese: 白萝卜; traditional Chinese: 白蘿蔔; pinyin: báiluóbo) or simply radish (萝卜; 蘿蔔; luóbo; lo^{4} baak^{6} in Cantonese). Although in Cantonese and Malaysian cuisine, it is encountered as lobak or lo pak, which are Cantonese pronunciations of the general Chinese term for "radish". In the cuisines of Min Chinese-speaking areas communities as Hokkien and Teochew speakers in Singapore, Thailand, and Taiwan, as well as Wenzhounese-speaking areas, it is also known as chai tow or chai tau (菜头; 菜頭). In English-speaking countries, it is also sometimes marketed as icicle radish. Other regional names for the vegetable include Taiwanese Hakka "little radish" (萝卜仔; 蘿蔔仔), Dongguanese and Zhongshan Min "radish-vegetable" (萝卜菜; 蘿蔔菜), among others.

Several more terms loaned from Chinese appear in East Asian Englishes. In Singapore, the calque white carrot or misnomer carrot is sometimes used, owing to the similarity of the vegetables' names in Mandarin and Hokkien (in Mandarin Chinese, carrot is called 胡萝卜; 胡蘿蔔, which is literally "occidental radish"). This variant inspired the title for a popular guidebook on Singaporean street food, There's No Carrot in Carrot Cake, which refers to chai tow kway, a kind of cake made with daikon. Similarly but interestingly, in Hong Kong, the misnomer turnip is also used. This name lends its name to the dish "turnip cake", which is actually chai tow kway with a different name.

In North America, it is primarily grown not for food but as a fallow crop, with the roots left unharvested to prevent soil compaction; the leaves (if harvested) are used as animal fodder. The official general name used by the United States Department of Agriculture is oilseed radish, but this is only used in non-culinary contexts. Other English terms employed when daikon is used as animal feed or as a soil ripper are "forage radish", "fodder radish", and "tillage radish".

== Varieties ==
Several nonwhite varieties occur. The Cantonese lobak, lo pak, etc., sometimes refer to the usual Chinese form but is also applied to a form of daikon with a light green coloration of the top area of the root around the leaves. The Korean radish, also called mu (Korean: 무; lit. 'radish'), has a similar pale green shade halfway down from the top and are generally shorter, stouter, and sturdier, with denser flesh and softer leaves. Both are often spicier than the long white radishes

The watermelon radish is a Chinese heirloom variety of daikon with a dull green exterior but a bright rose or fuchsia-colored center. Its Chinese name is sometimes irregularly romanized as the shinrimei radish (traditional Chinese: 心裡美蘿蔔; simplified Chinese: 心里美萝卜; pinyin: xīnlǐměi luóbó) and sometimes translated as the "beauty heart," "beautiful heart inside," or "roseheart" radish.

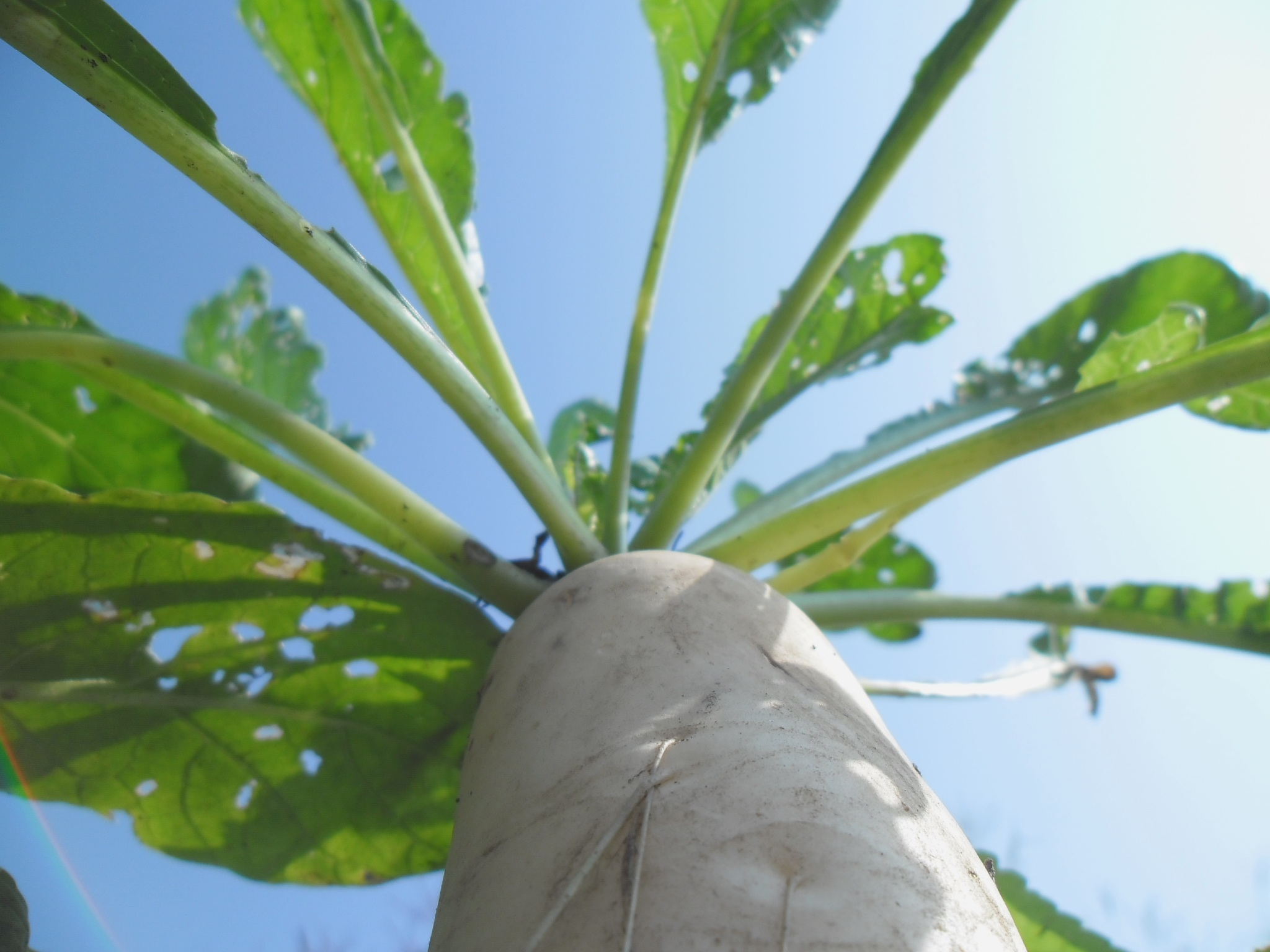
A radish growing in China

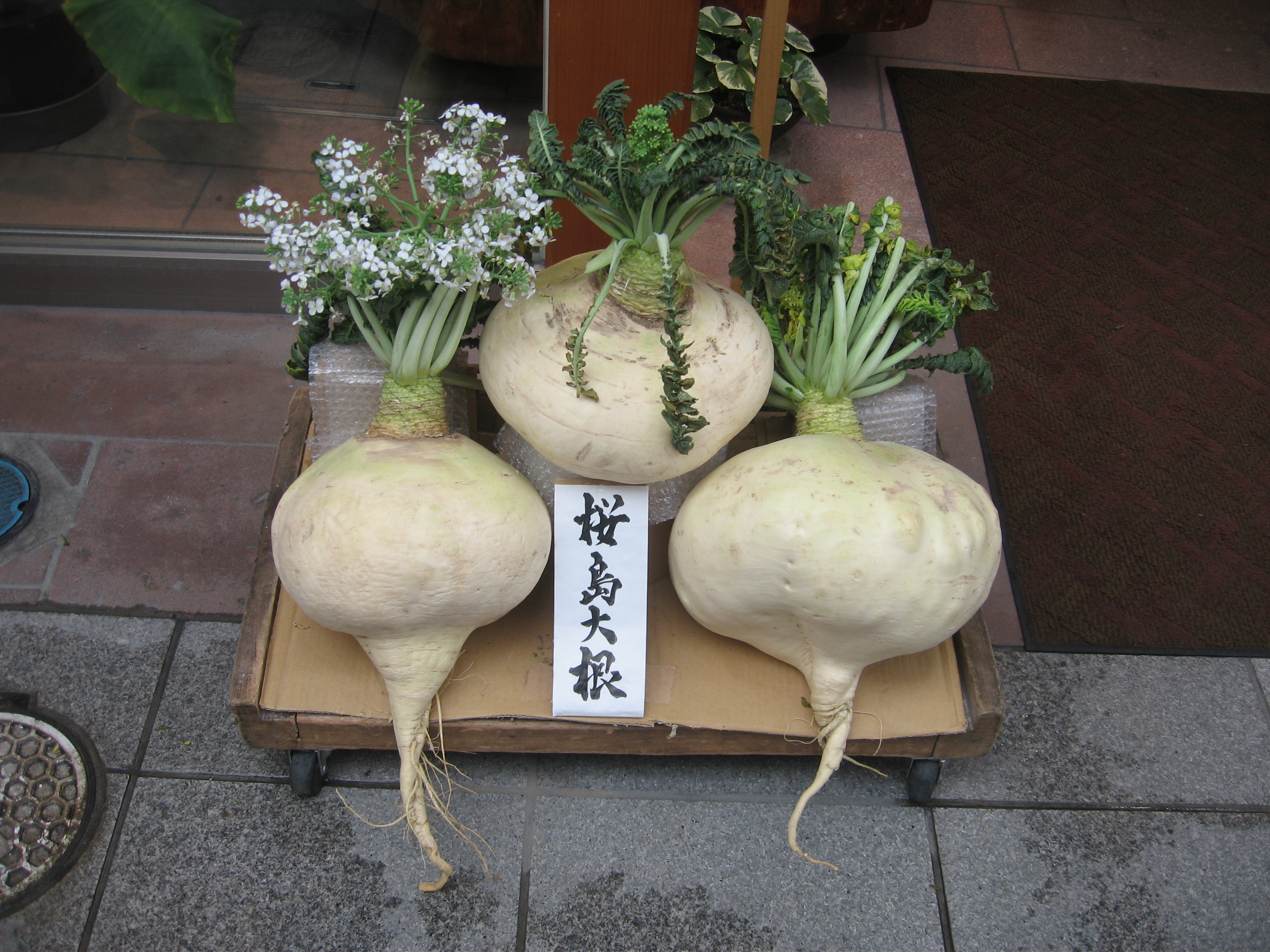
Sakurajima radishes

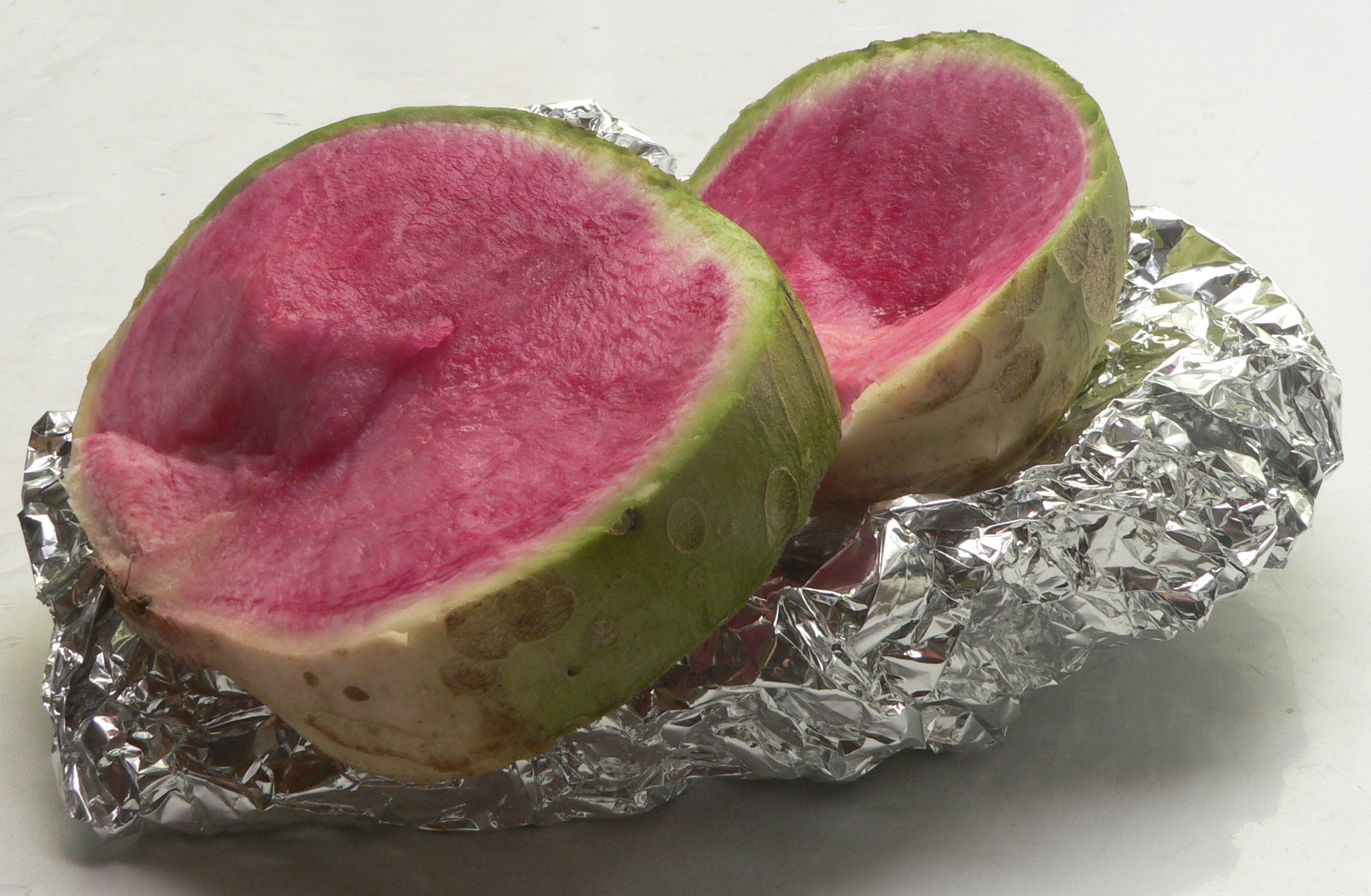
Sliced watermelon radish

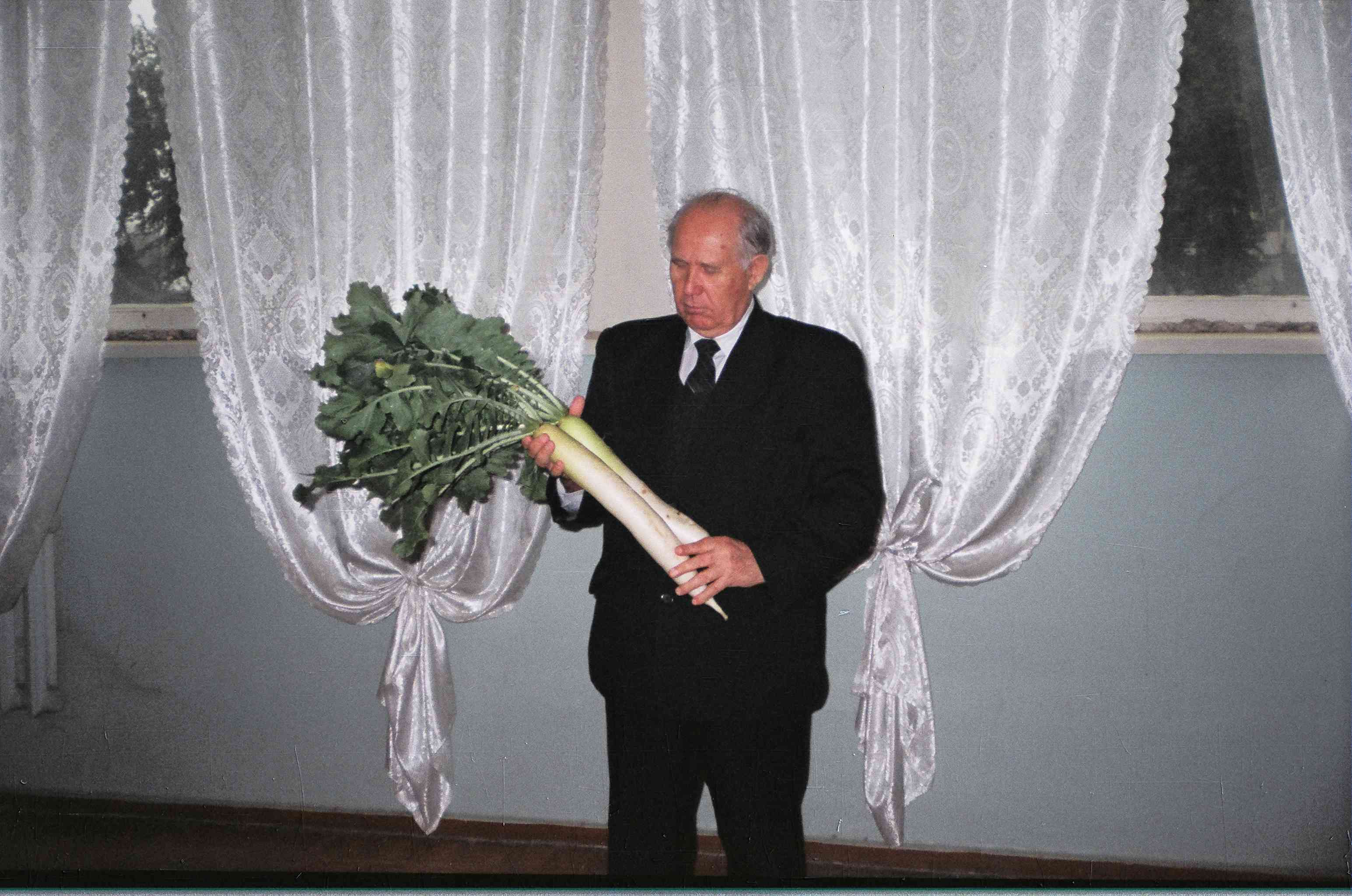
Professor Vladimir Zuev displays a new daikon variety Kuz hadyasi in Uzbekistan

== Cultivation ==
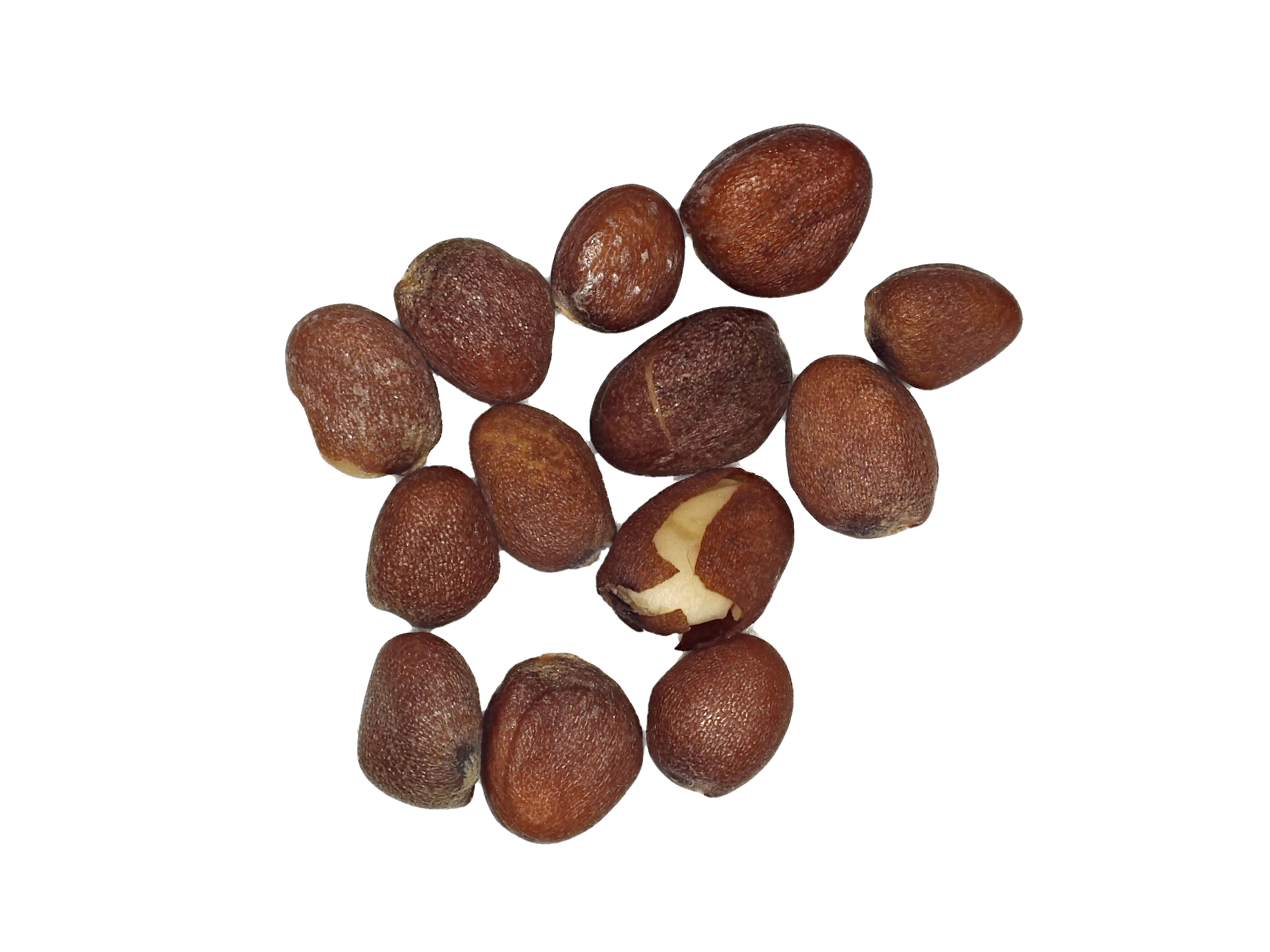
White radish seeds

The Chinese and Indian varieties tolerate higher temperatures than the Japanese. These varieties also grow well at lower elevations in East Africa. If moisture is abundant it can grow quickly, otherwise the flesh becomes tough and pungent. The variety Long White Icicle is available as seed in Britain and will grow very successfully in southern England, producing roots resembling a parsnip by midsummer in good garden soil in an average year.

The roots can be stored for weeks without the leaves if lifted and kept in a cool, dry place. If left in the ground, the texture tends to become woody, but the storage life of whole untreated roots 2-4 weeks.

Certain varieties of daikon can be grown as a winter cover crop and green manure. These varieties are often named "tillage radish" because the plant grows a huge, penetrating root that effectively performs deep cultivation. The roots bring nutrients lower in the soil profile up into the higher reaches and are good nutrient scavengers, so they are good partners with legumes instead of grasses; in harsh winters the root will decompose while in the soil, releasing early nitrogen stores in the spring.

== Culinary uses ==
=== Bangladesh ===
In Bangladesh, fresh daikon is often finely grated and mixed with fresh chili, coriander, flaked steamed fish, lime juice, and salt. This light, refreshing preparation served alongside meals is known as mulo bhorta.

=== China ===
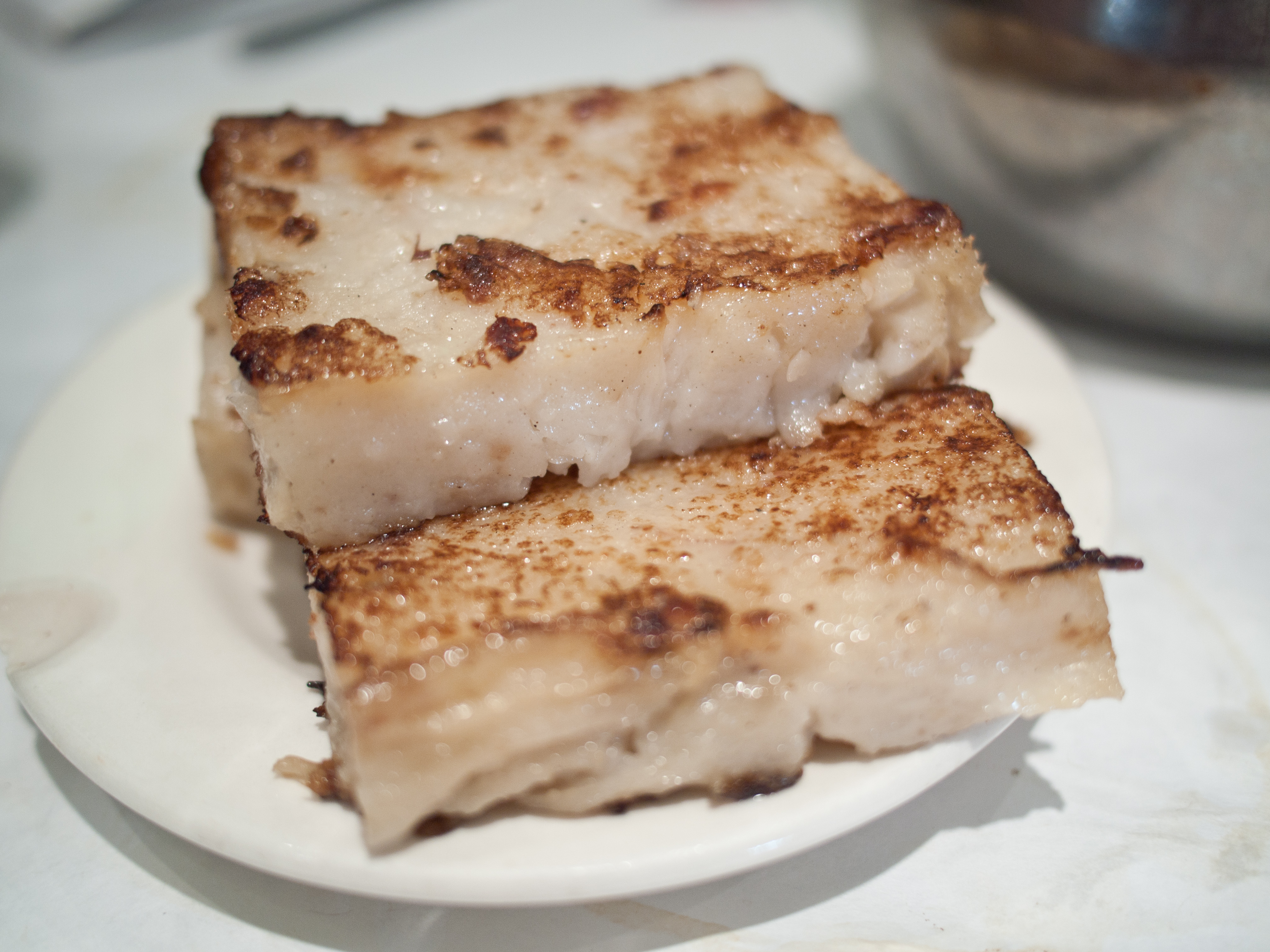
Chinese turnip cakes are made with radish, despite its name

In Chinese cuisine, turnip cake and chai tow kway are made with daikon. The variety called mooli has a high water content, and some cookbooks recommend salting (or sweetening, depending on the region and context) and draining it before it is cooked. Sometimes, mooli is used as a medium for elaborately carved garnishes. More commonly, daikon is referred as bailuobo (白蘿蔔) in Mandarin or lobak in Cantonese. Bailuobo is used in various dishes for its unique and mild flavour after being boiled and cooked. For soups, bailuobo can be seen in daikon and pork rib soup (白蘿蔔排骨湯), daikon and tomato soup (白蘿蔔番茄湯), daikon and tofu soup (白蘿蔔豆腐湯), etc. Delicacies such as "shredded daikon" (白蘿蔔絲) and "cut daikon" (白蘿蔔塊) are popular domestic dishes too. Similar to Japanese cuisine, there are many types of pickles (in Mandarin Chinese: 咸菜 xiáncài / 榨菜 zhàcài) made with daikon, for example, "sour-sweet cut daikon" (酸甜白蘿蔔塊), "spicy daikon" (麻辣白蘿蔔), daikon zhacai (白蘿蔔榨菜), etc.

=== India ===
In North India, daikon is a popular ingredient used to make sabzi, stuffed paranthas, pakodas, salads, pickles, and as garnish. The plant's leaves are used to make dal and kadhi, among other dishes. In South India, daikon is the principal ingredient in a variety of sambar, in which seeds of the radish are boiled with onions, tamarind pulp, lentils, and a special spice powder. When cooked, it can release a very strong odor. This soup, called mullangi sambar (Tamil: முள்ளங்கி சாம்பார், Kannada: ಮುಲ್ಲಂಗಿ ಸಾಂಬಾರ್; literally, "radish sambar") is very popular and is often mixed with rice.

=== Japan ===
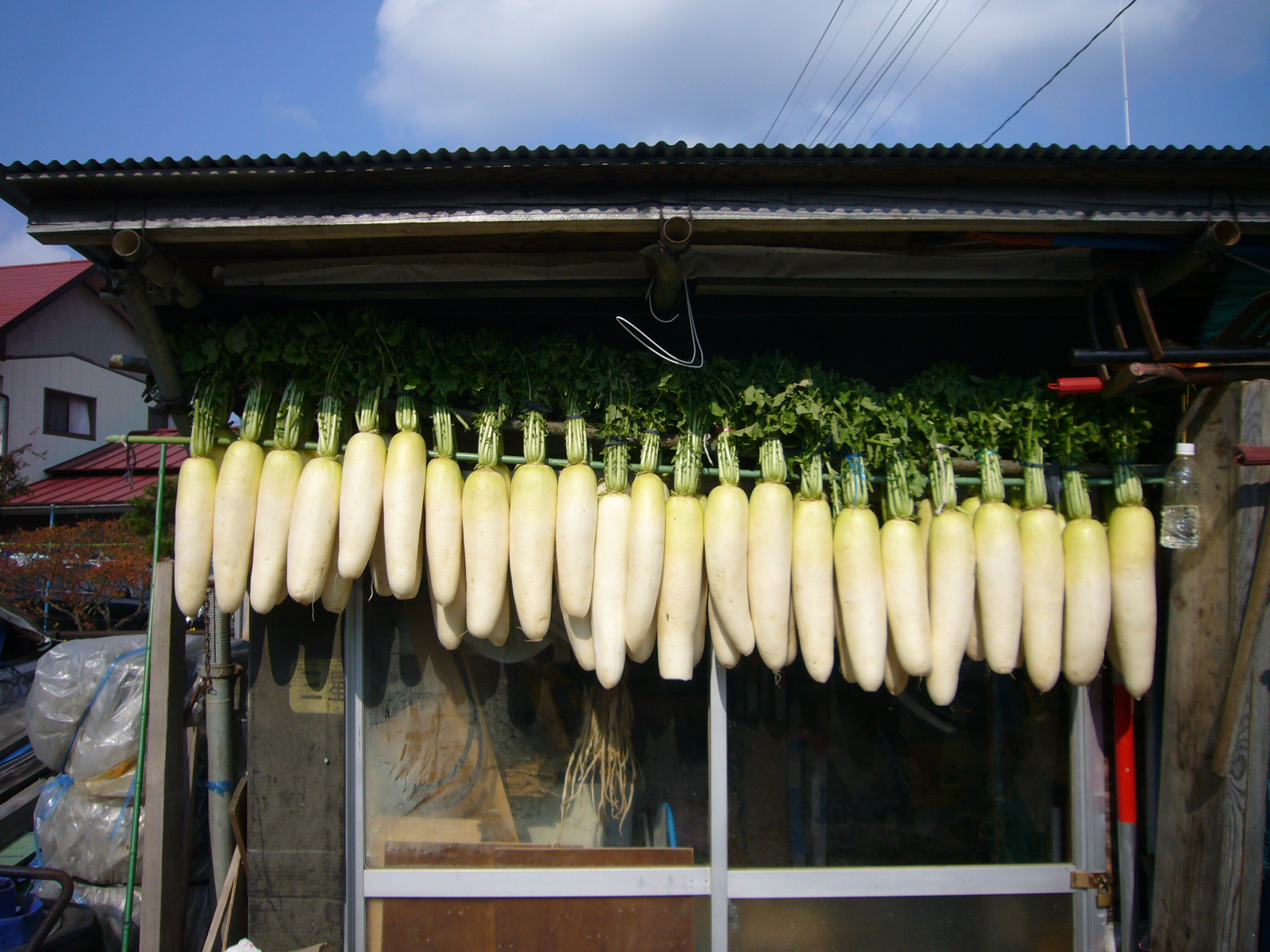

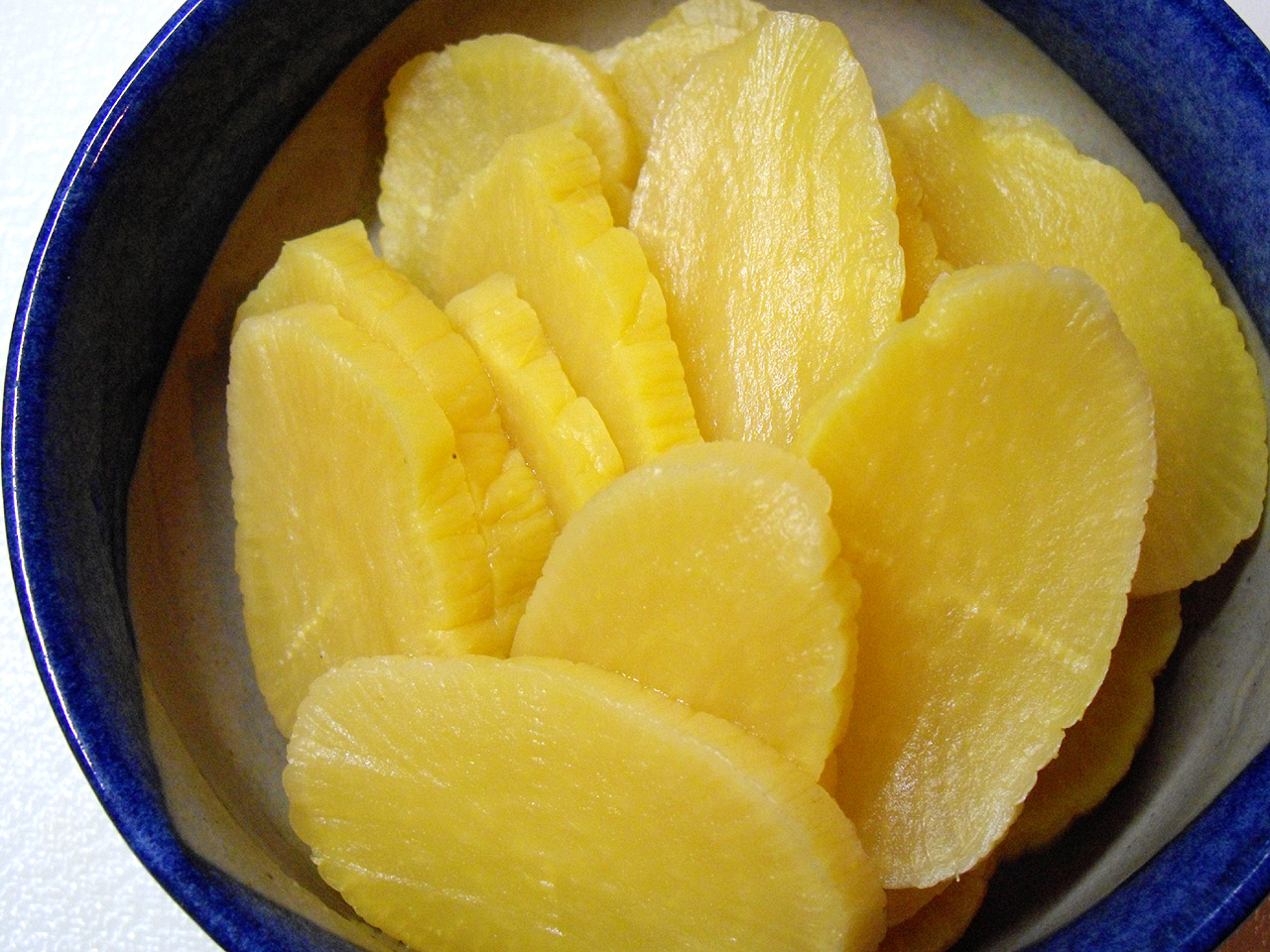
Takuan, pickled daikon radish

In Japan, many types of pickles are made with daikon roots, including takuan and bettarazuke. Daikon roots can be served raw, in salads, or as sashimi's tsuma (つま, accompaniment), which is prepared by meticulous katsura-muki (桂剥き, katsura peeling (etymology disputed)). Daikon-oroshi (大根おろし, grated daikon) is frequently used as a garnish, often mixed into various dippings such as ponzu, a soy sauce and citrus juice condiment. The pink spicy momiji-oroshi (もみじおろし, literally "autumn-leaf-red grated [daikon]") is daikon grated with chili pepper. Simmered dishes are also popular such as oden. Daikon that has been shredded and dried (a common method of preserving food in Japan) is called kiriboshi-daikon (切干大根, "cut-dried daikon").

Daikon radish sprouts (kaiware-daikon (貝割れ大根, literally "open-clam-like daikon")) are used raw for salad or garnishing sashimi.

Daikon leaves are frequently eaten as a green vegetable. They are thorny when raw, so softening methods such as pickling and stir frying are common. The daikon leaf is one of the nanakusa (春の七草, literally "seven spring herbs") eaten at the Festival of Seven Herbs (jinjitsu), where it is called suzushiro.

==== Nerima daikon ====
Nerima daikon refers to a variety of radish that originated in Nerima Ward, Tokyo, and is a designated specialty product of the area. The local Kanto loam soil is particularly suitable for its cultivation. Due to its shape, the Nerima daikon is famously difficult to pull from the ground. This characteristic is the basis for the Nerima Daikon Pulling Contest, organized by JA Tokyo Aoba, where participants compete in the number and length of daikons harvested. Some of the crop grown under contract with the ward is processed into takuan (pickled radish) and sold under the name Nerima Honboshi Takuan. As part of local production and consumption initiatives, elementary schools in Nerima Ward serve Nerima Spaghetti, a school lunch menu featuring a grated Nerima daikon topping.

=== Pakistan ===
In Pakistani cuisine, the young leaves of the daikon plant are boiled and flash-fried with a mixture of heated oil, garlic, ginger, red chili, and various spices. The radish is eaten as a fresh salad, often seasoned with either salt and pepper or chaat masala. In Punjab province, daikon is used to stuff pan-fried breads known as paratha. Daikon's seed pods called moongray in local languages, are also eaten as a stir-fried dish across the country.

=== Philippines ===
In the Philippines, the sour stew sinigang may include daikon. Daikon is known locally as labanos.

=== South Korea ===
In South Korea, daikon radish is often eaten as kkakdugi, a variety of kimchi, the traditional Korean fermented dish. Kimchi is most commonly eaten as a side dish with rice, among other dishes. It is most commonly made with daikon radish, carrots, scallions, and other easily fermented vegetables.

=== Taiwan ===
In Taiwanese cuisine, both the root and the stems/leaves of the daikon are consumed.

=== Vietnam ===
In Vietnamese cuisine, sweet and sour pickled daikon and carrots (củ cải cà rốt chua or đồ chua) are a common condiment in bánh mì sandwiches.

=== Gallery ===
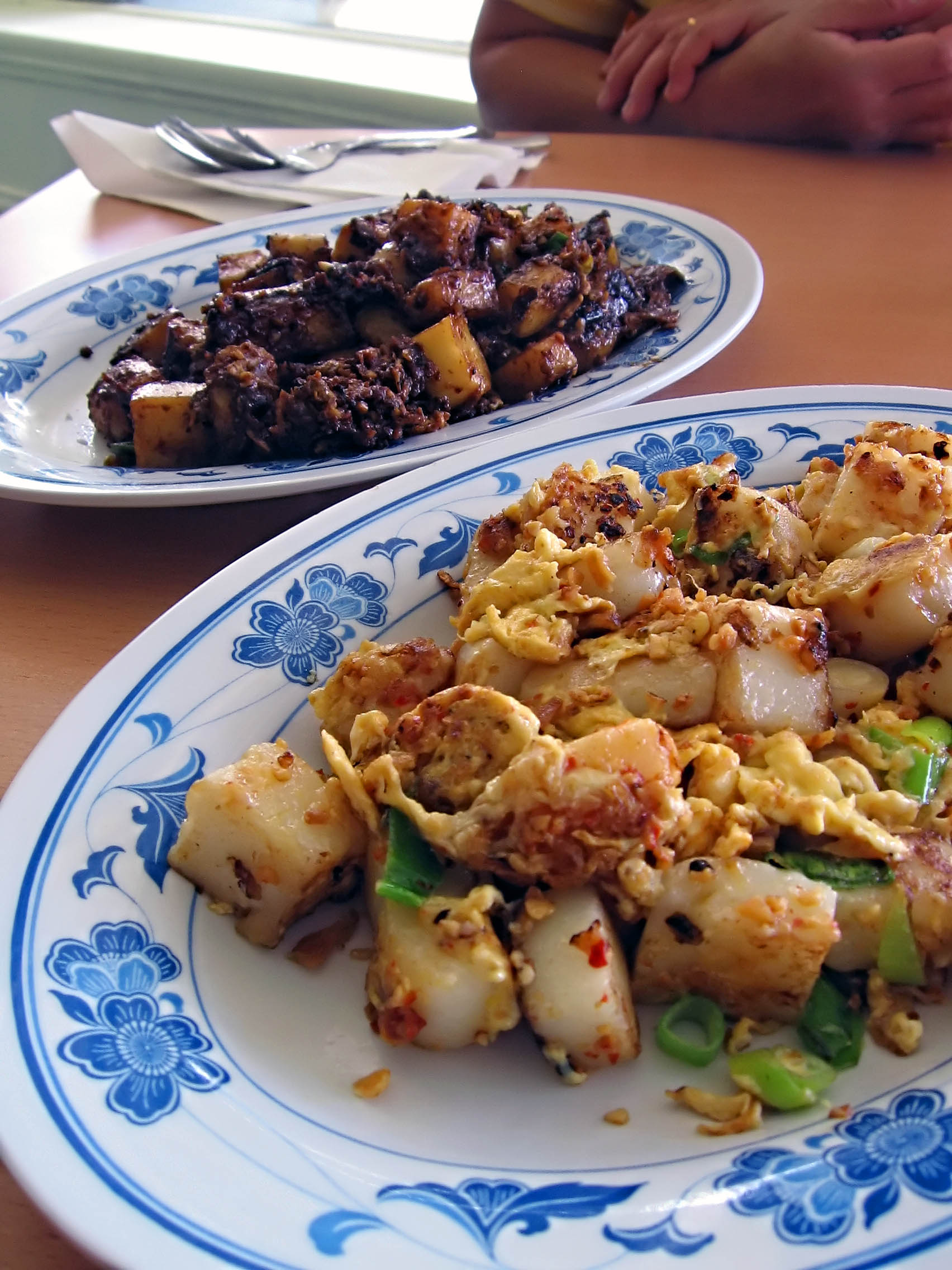
Chai tow kway, stir-fried cubes of radish cake

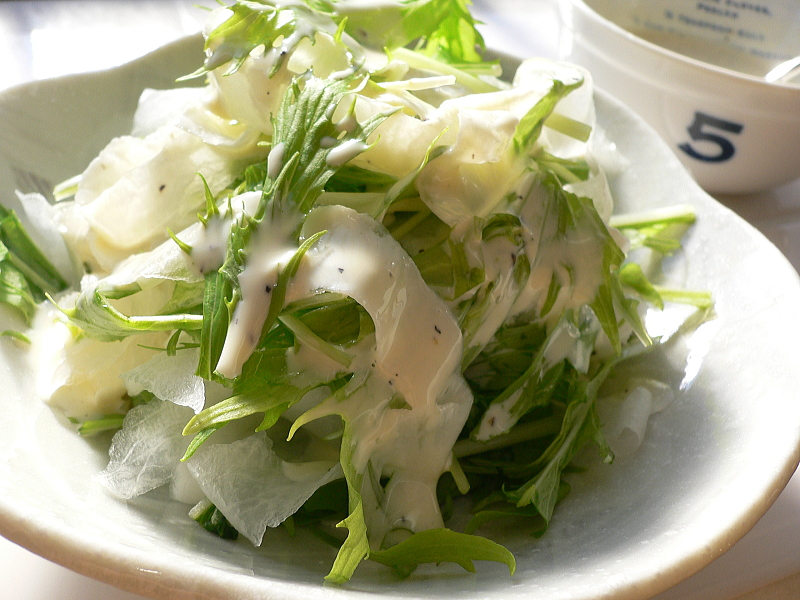
Japanese mizuna and daikon salad

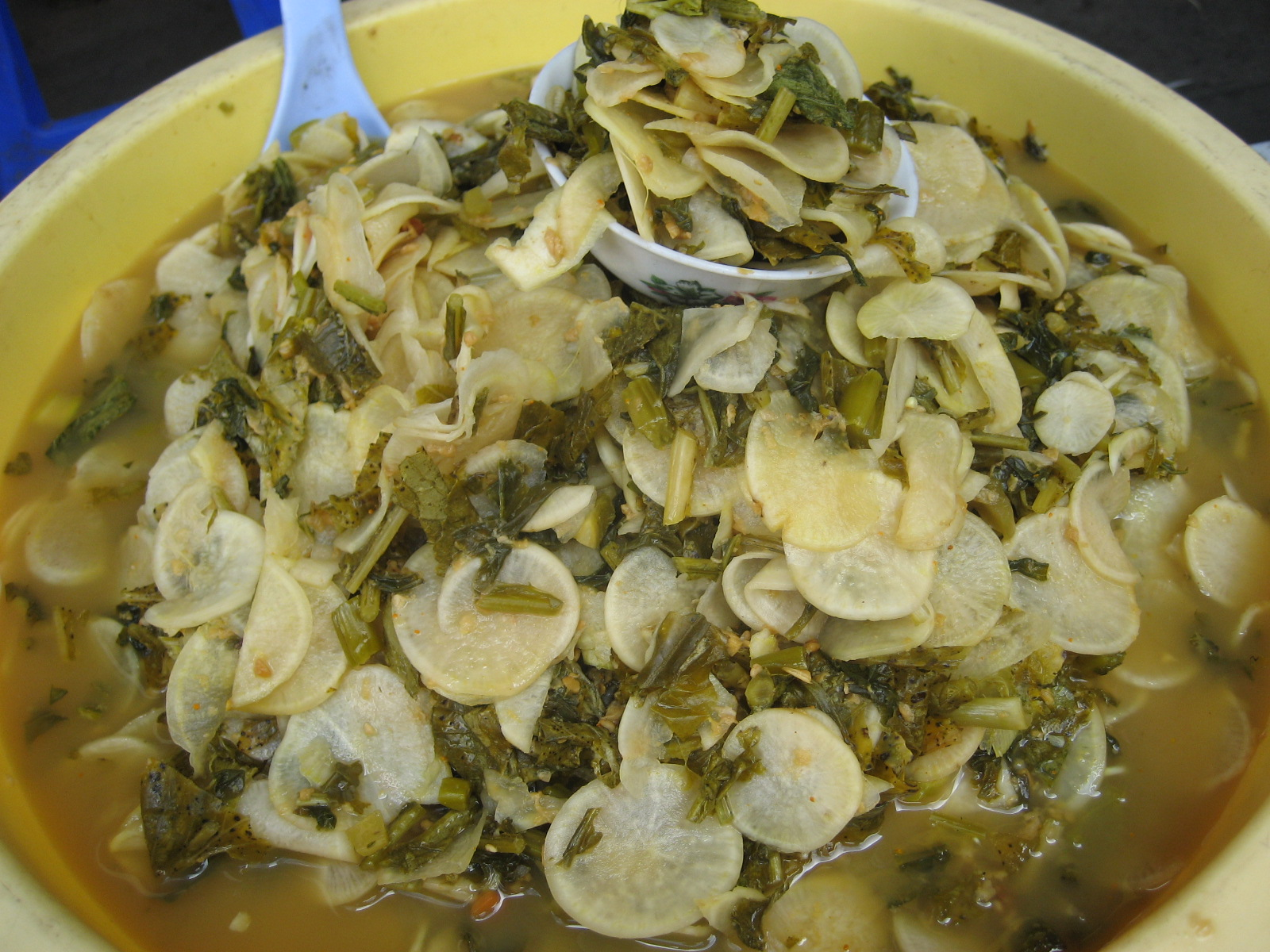
Mohn la jin, Burmese pickled radish

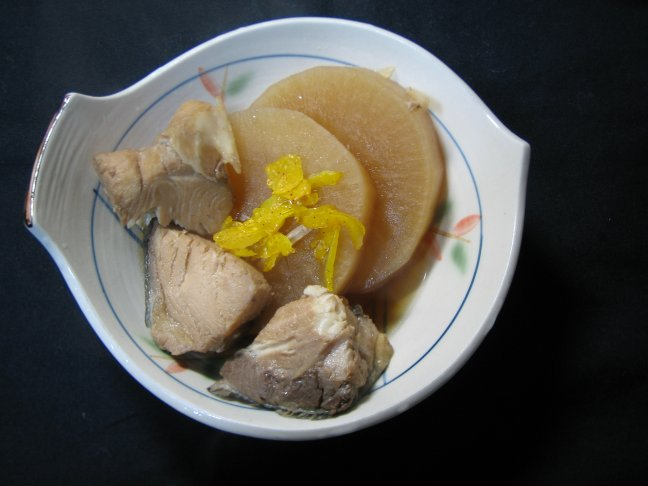
Buri daikon, Japan

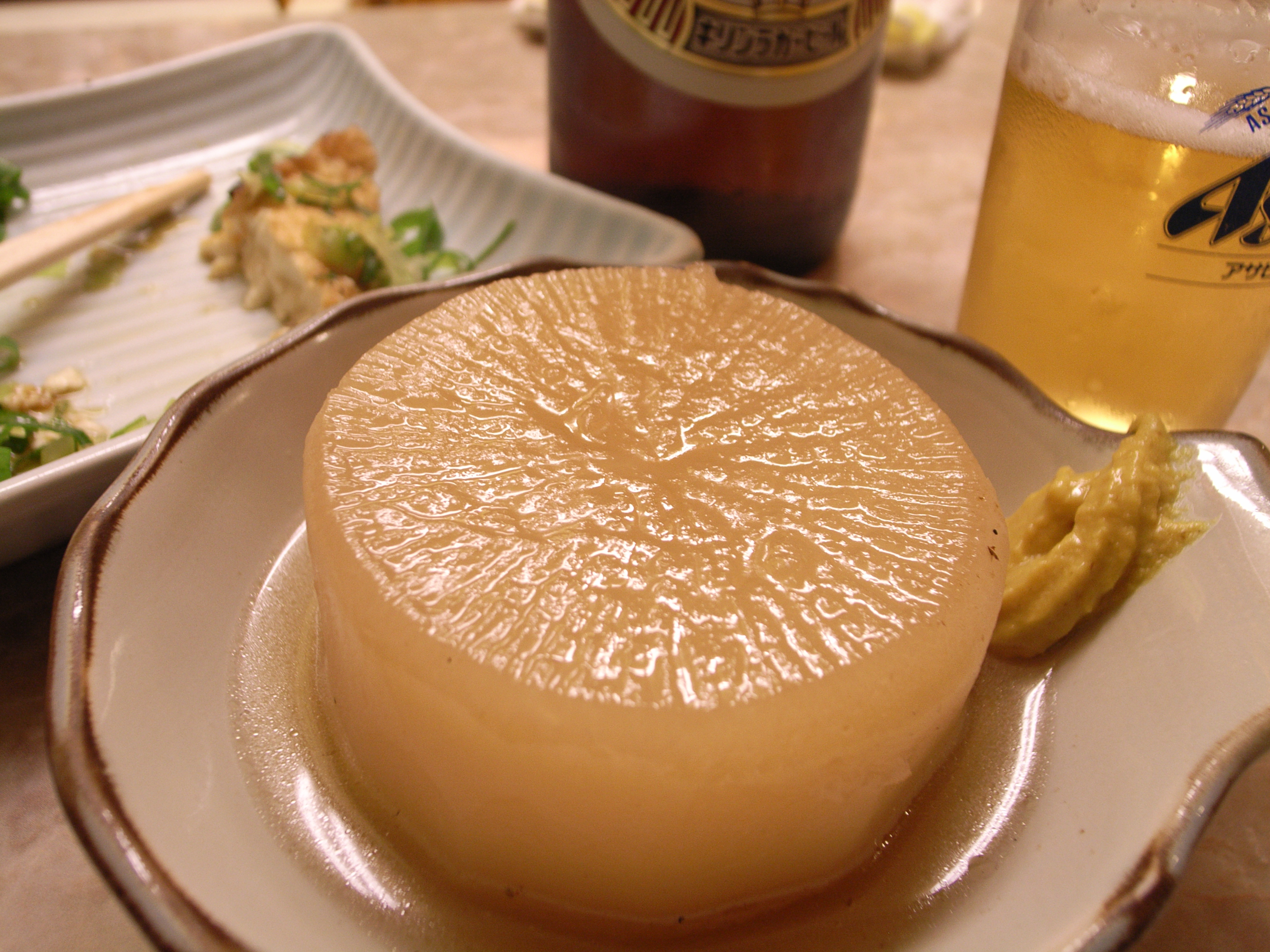
Daikon oden in Kyoto, Japan

=== Nutrition ===
Radishes, Oriental, raw
Nutritional value per 100 g (3.5 oz)
- Energy: 76 kJ (18 kcal)
- Carbohydrates: 4.1 g
- Sugars: 2.5
- Dietary fiber: 1.6 g
- Fat: 0.1 g
- Protein: 0.6 g
Vitamins and minerals
Vitamins	Quantity %DV^{†}
Thiamine (B1)	2% 0.02 mg
Riboflavin (B2)	2% 0.02 mg
Niacin (B3)	1% 0.2 mg
Pantothenic acid (B5)	3% 0.138 mg
Vitamin B6	3% 0.046 mg
Folate (B9)	7% 28 μg
Vitamin C	24% 22 mg
Minerals	Quantity %DV^{†}
Calcium	2% 27 mg
Iron	2% 0.4 mg
Magnesium	4% 16 mg
Manganese	2% 0.038 mg
Phosphorus	2% 23 mg
Potassium	8% 227 mg
Sodium	1% 21 mg
Zinc	1% 0.15 mg
- Other constituents: Quantity
- Water: 94.6 g
- Link to USDA Database entry
- ^{†}Percentages estimated using US recommendations for adults, except for potassium, which is estimated based on expert recommendation from the National Academies.

Raw daikon is 95% water, 4% carbohydrates, and less than 1% each of protein and fat (table). In a reference amount of 100 grams (3.5 oz), raw daikon supplies 18 calories and is a rich source (20% or more of the Daily Value, DV) of vitamin C (24% DV), with no other micronutrients in significant content (table).

== Agricultural use ==
Tillage radish leaves behind a cavity in the soil when the large taproot decays, making it easier for the following year's crops, such as potatoes, to bore deeper into the soil. Potatoes grown in a rotation with tillage radish do not experience growth restrictions associated with having a shallow hardpan soil, as the tillage radish can break the hardpan, making the transfer of water and other important nutrients much easier for the root system.

Nutrient retention is another important feature of tillage radish. The large taproot is used to retain macro- and micro-nutrients that would otherwise have the potential to be lost to leaching during the time when the field would otherwise be left empty. The nutrients from the root become readily available for the following year's crop upon the decay of the radish, which can boost yields and reduce fertilizer costs.

Daikons are also used as a forage worldwide. As a forage, they also have the side benefit of weed suppression. Although used elsewhere for much longer, daikon as a forage is a recent introduction in Massachusetts field practice.

== Other use ==
Daikon is used in preparing metal surfaces for chemical patination, for example, under the Rokushō process.

== See also ==
- Chonggak radish
- Gegeol radish
