= Erucin =

Molecule

Names
- IUPAC name 1-Isothiocyanato-4-methylsulfanylbutane
- Other names 4-Methylthiobutyl isothiocyanate

Identifiers
CAS Number	4430-36-8
3D model (JSmol)	Interactive image
ChEBI	CHEBI:180130
ChEMBL	ChEMBL2151143
ChemSpider	70536
ECHA InfoCard	100.158.918
EC Number	630-604-5
PubChem CID	78160
UNII	CTE370DL3U
CompTox Dashboard (EPA)	DTXSID80196117
- InChI: InChI=1S/C6H11NS2/c1-9-5-3-2-4-7-6-8/h2-5H2,1H3 Key: IHQDGXUYTSZGOG-UHFFFAOYSA-N
- SMILES: CSCCCCN=C=S

Properties
Chemical formula	C_{6}H_{11}NS_{2}
Molar mass	161.28 g·mol^{−1}

Hazards
- GHS labelling
Pictograms	(GHS05: Corrosive)
Signal word	Danger
Hazard statements	H314
Precautionary statements	P260, P264, P264+P265, P280, P301+P330+P331, P302+P361+P354, P304+P340, P305+P354+P338, P316, P317, P321, P363, P405, P501
- Except where otherwise noted, data are given for materials in their standard state (at 25 °C [77 °F], 100 kPa). Infobox references

Erucin (4-methylthiobutyl isothiocyanate) is a dietary isothiocyanate present in cruciferous vegetables that is considered a potential cancer chemopreventive nutraceutical.

== Characteristics ==
Erucin is produced by the enzymatic hydrolysis of the glucosinolate glucoerucin present in Eruca sativa Mill. seeds (Brassicaceae or Cruciferae). Erucin has structural analogies with sulforaphane (SFN), an isothiocyanate derived from glucoraphanin, a glucosinolate present in some edible crucifers, and known in the literature for its chemopreventive properties. Different isothiocyanates exert anticancer properties on many tumor types (liver, breast, bladder, lung, and pancreatic), and in particular, SFN is employed in a pilot randomized controlled clinical trial in advanced pancreatic cancer.
