= Broccoli sprouts =

Edible young broccoli plants

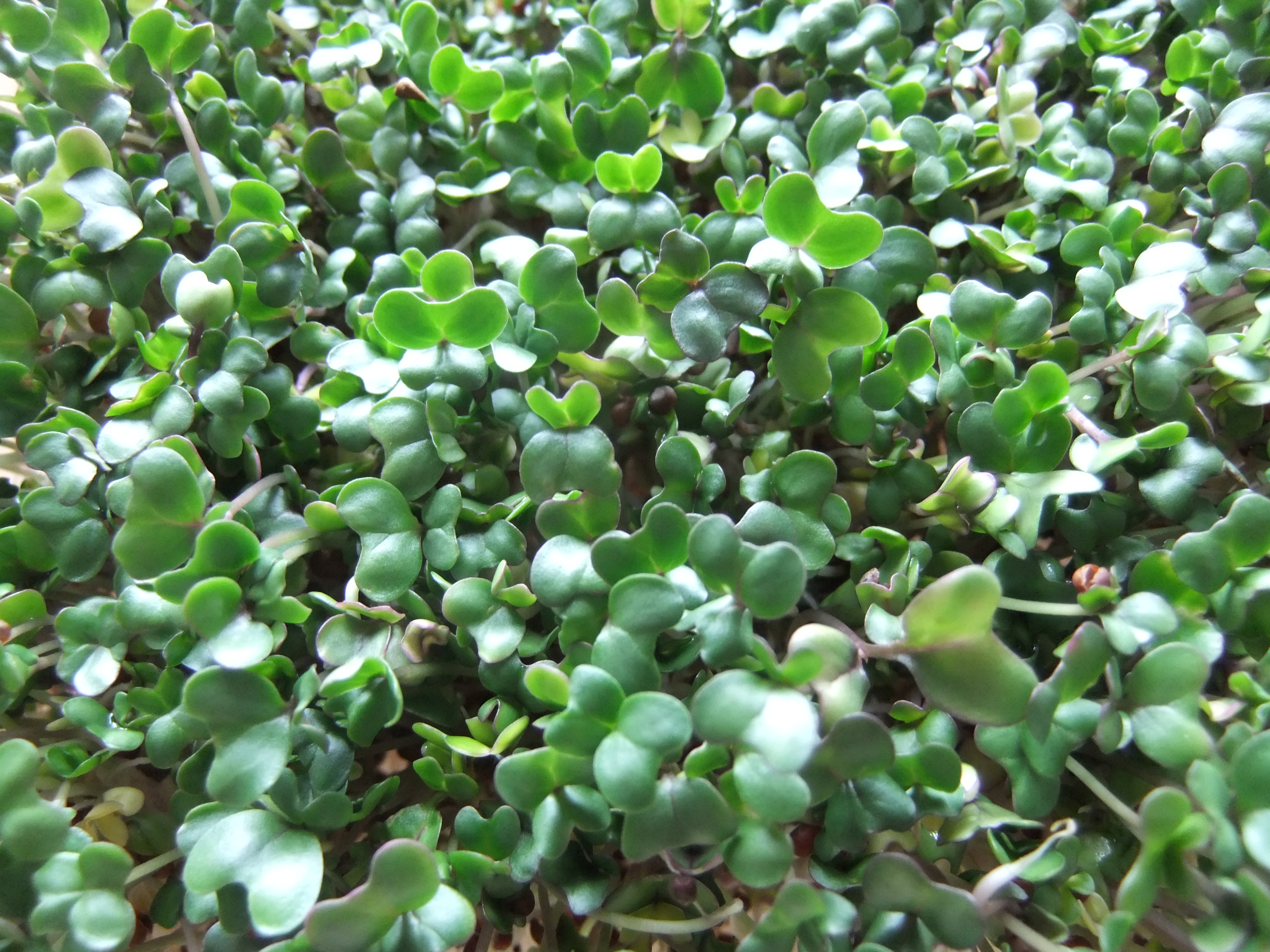
Broccoli sprouts – five days old

Broccoli sprouts are three- to four-day-old broccoli plants that look like alfalfa sprouts, but taste like radishes.

== History ==
While health-conscious people in the 1970s embraced raw sprouts as a dietary staple, it was not until the 1990s that broccoli sprouts entered the mainstream. A 1997 discovery about high levels of glucoraphanin in broccoli sprouts was written about in a New York Times article, and created a global shortage of broccoli seed that could not meet the sudden high demand.

== Glucosinolate and sulforaphane ==
Broccoli sprouts are rich in sulforaphane. Although there has been some basic research on how sulforaphane might exert beneficial effects in vivo, there is no high-quality evidence for its efficacy against human diseases.

Broccoli sprouts also contain a particular glucosinolate compound, glucoraphanin, which is found in vacuoles within the cytoplasm of the plant cell.

== Availability and types ==
Broccoli sprouts are available in health foods stores and some grocery stores in most of the developed world and other countries. Broccoli seeds are available for home growing. One can sprout broccoli seeds using a jar or a commercial sprouting kit. Broccoli sprout powders and capsules are also available. However, many of these products are produced from myrosinase-inactive sprout or seed extracts. It is difficult, if not impossible, for the consumer to identify which products contain both the essential precursor glucoraphanin as well as the active myrosinase enzyme. With a myrosinase-inactive product, an individual may not convert any of the glucoraphanin to sulforaphane. Because so little is known about the role of human gut microflora at this stage, reliance on the gut microflora with its wide variability could pose a significant limitation on the achievement of a biochemical response.

== Sprout safety ==
The U.S. Food and Drug Administration (FDA) issued suggested protocols recommending commercially grown sprout seeds be soaked and sterilized with 20,000 PPM calcium hypochlorite prior to sprouting.

A study published in Nutrition Journal quantifies the effectiveness of sprout safety programs.
