= Raphanin =

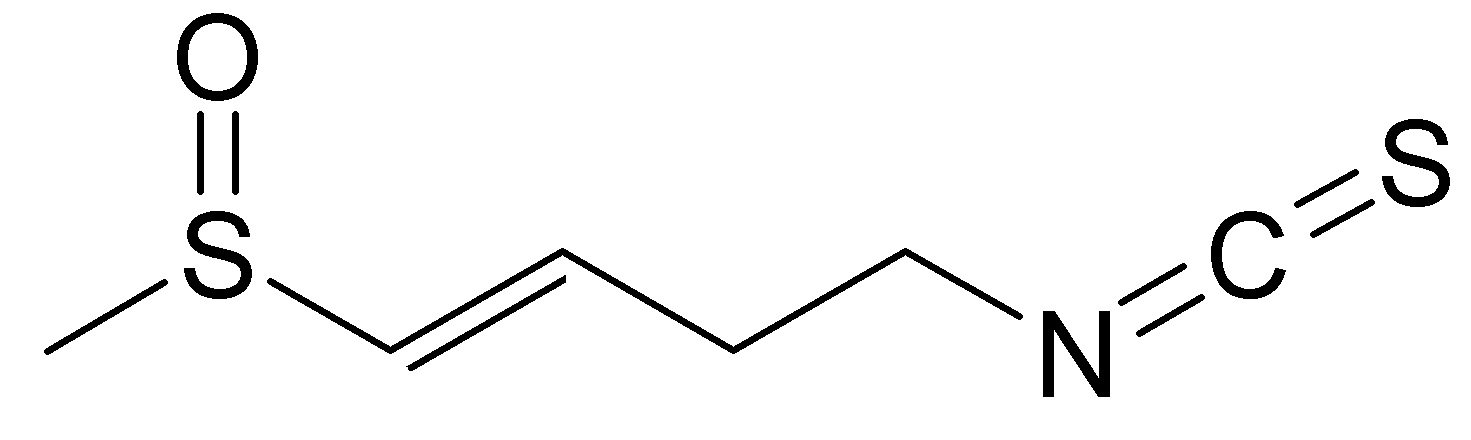

Names
- Preferred IUPAC name (1E)-4-Isothiocyanato-1-(methanesulfinyl)but-1-ene
- Other names Sulforaphen; Sulforaphene; Sativin

Identifiers
CAS Number	592-95-0
3D model (JSmol)	Interactive image
ChemSpider	16736047
PubChem CID	6433206
UNII	NCO9MC39IO
- InChI: InChI=1S/C6H9NOS2/c1-10(8)5-3-2-4-7-6-9/h3,5H,2,4H2,1H3 Key: QKGJFQMGPDVOQE-UHFFFAOYSA-N; InChI=1/C6H9NOS2/c1-10(8)5-3-2-4-7-6-9/h3,5H,2,4H2,1H3 Key: QKGJFQMGPDVOQE-UHFFFAOYAU
- SMILES: S=C=N/CC\C=C\S(=O)C

Properties
Chemical formula	C_{6}H_{9}NOS_{2}
Molar mass	175.26 g·mol^{−1}
- Except where otherwise noted, data are given for materials in their standard state (at 25 °C [77 °F], 100 kPa). Infobox references

Raphanin is the main sulfur component found in radish seeds of Raphanus sativus and is also found in broccoli and red cabbage. It was first described in 1947.

== Basic research ==
In vitro, raphanin inhibits some fungi and various bacteria including Staphylococcus, Streptococcus, Pneumococcus and Escherichia coli.

Minimum inhibitory concentration of raphanin
Bacteria	MIC (mg/mL)
Staphylococcus	0.04
Shigella dysenteriae	0.125
Salmonella typhi	0.125
Escherichia coli	0.2

== See also ==
- Raffinose
- Sulforaphane
