= Black radish =

Species of flowering plant

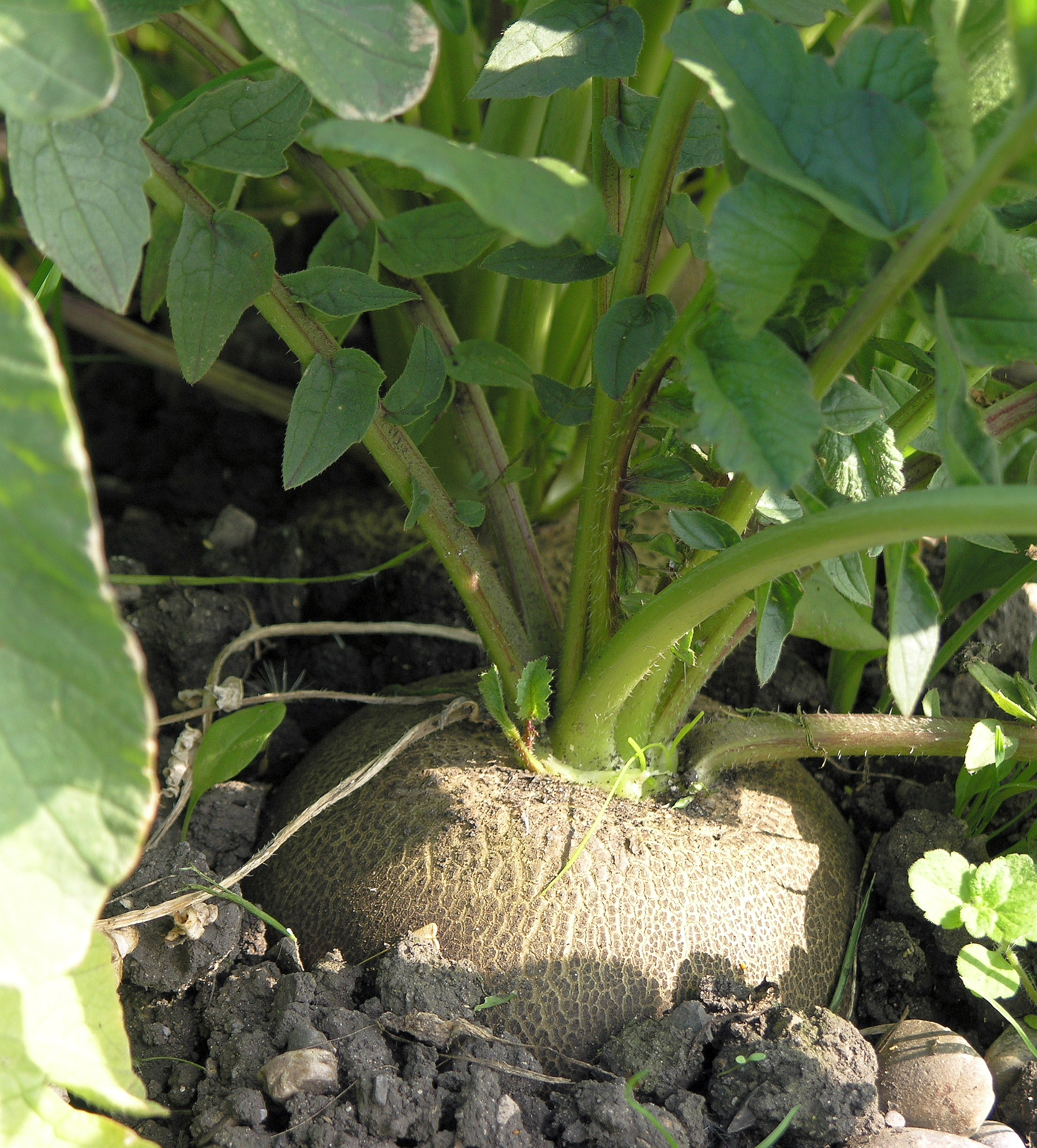
- Black radish, round variety
- Genus: Raphanus
- Species: Raphanus raphanistrum
- Subspecies: Raphanus raphanistrum subsp. sativus
- Cultivar: several, including 'Black Spanish Round'

The black radish, a cultivated variety of the radish, is a root vegetable of the family Brassicaceae and is a variety of winter radish. It is also called black Spanish radish or Erfurter radish.

The edible root has a tough black skin and white flesh. There are round and elongated varieties. Like other radishes, black radish has a sharp flavor due to various chemical compounds that the plant primarily uses as pest defense. Some of these phytochemicals are produced in high concentrations.

== History ==
The domestication and early history of radishes is not completely solved. Black radish likely originated from Raphanus maritimus while spring radish varieties originated from Raphanus landra. Cultivation can be traced back to Ancient Egypt, where illustrations in tombs show extensive use of a long variety of radish. The region of today's Syria is likely the geographical origin of black radish. It was first mentioned in Europe in 1548. At that time, it was one of the most common radish varieties. It lost its importance with the introduction of new radish-varieties but was still widely cultivated until the early 20th century. In the second half of the 20th century it had to give way to spring radish varieties and got "forgotten" in European cuisine. It is now considered an “old variety” and enjoys renewed popularity as health-food through mentions in lifestyle and food blogs and magazines.

== Description ==
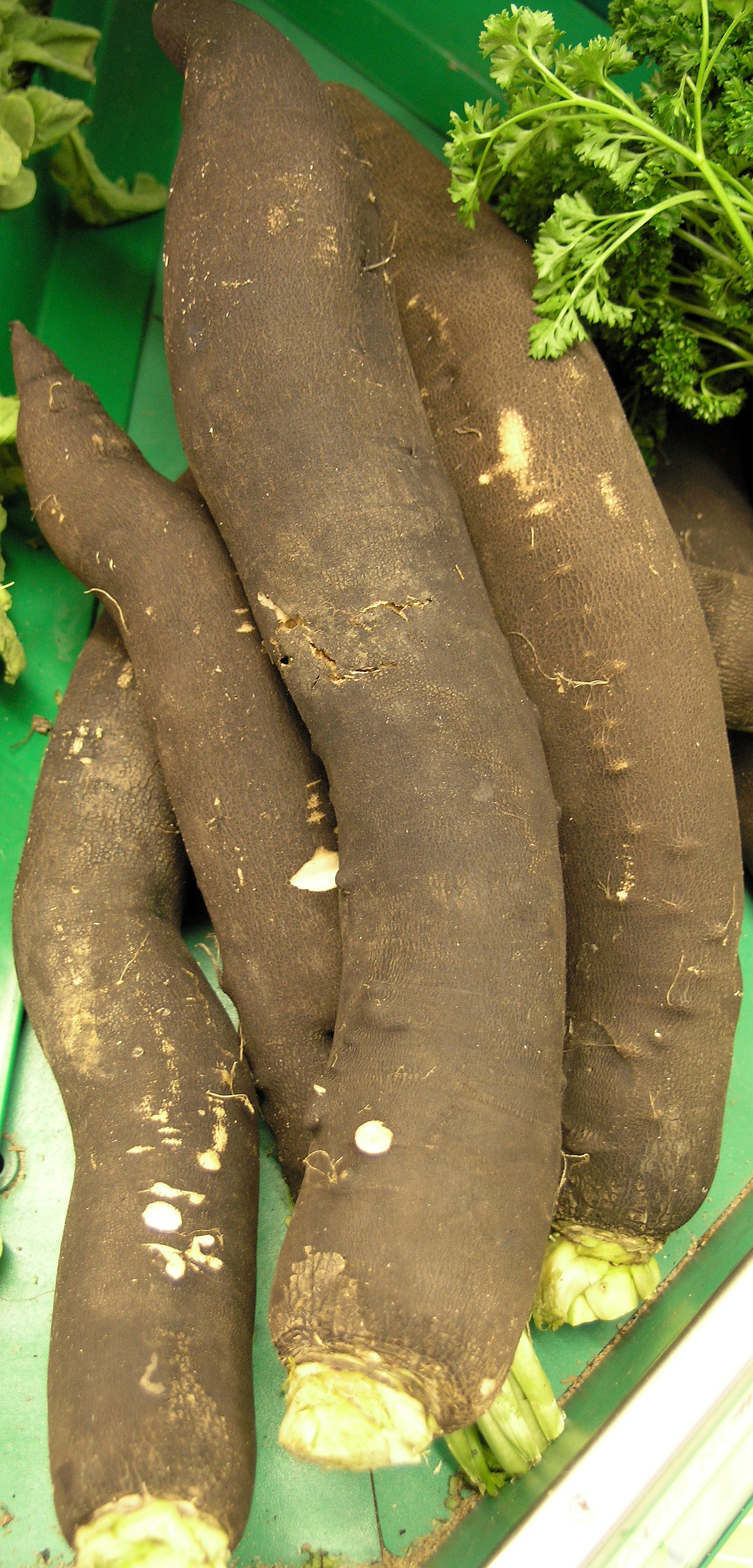
Black radish, long variety

Black radish is an annual plant whose root is encased in a black or dull brown skin and with a white flesh. Generally, black radish is bigger than spring radish varieties and grows around seven to ten centimeters in diameter or length. The plants can grow up to a height of 0.5 m (20 in). Depending on the variety, the radishes are round, cylindrical or elongated.

== Cultivation ==
Black radish takes 35 days to 55 days or longer to mature. It can be sown in mid summer to autumn, depending on the climate and be harvested in autumn or winter. Too high temperatures during growth should be avoided because the radishes get woody and spongy at such a climate. Sowing can happen directly in the field or indoors and the plants can later be transferred to the field. The plants should be spaced 5–10 cm (2–4 in) to each other or even more, if bigger radishes are desired. The seeds should be sown in a depth of 0.6–1.2 cm (1/4–1/2 in). Black radish requires a well-drained, loamy, soil with a pH of 5.9 to 6.8. The plants should get around six to eight hours of sun. Harvest should take place once the top portion is poking above the soil. Known pests are cabbage root maggots, cutworms and flea beetles.

For storage the mature plants can be kept in the ground if temperatures are low. The radish can also be kept for months in a root cellar or be stored in the fridge for up to three weeks at 0–5 °C (32–41 °F).

== Food ==
Black radish can be eaten raw as salad or cooked in soups or stews. As long as the black skin seems fresh and does not smell moldy, it can be consumed as well. The strong taste of the root can be reduced by adding salt to the raw root.

== Traditional medicine ==
Black raddish juice has been used since antiquity for its purported stimulation of bile function. Black radish has been used for many centuries in some regions of Asia, Africa, and Mexico. Black radish juice contains glucosinolates. Glucoraphasatin and glucoraphanin are the most abundant. Black radish has been studied for its potential use in the prevention of cholesterol gallstones.
