= Dadish =

Video game series

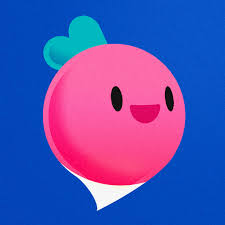
- Image of the app logo for Dadish
- Genres: 2D platformer, 3D platformer
- Developers: Thomas K Young, CatCup Games
- Publishers: Thomas K Young, CatCup Games
- Platforms: Nintendo Switch, PlayStation 4, PlayStation 5, Android, Xbox One, Microsoft Windows, iOS
- First release: Dadish; February 11, 2020
- Latest release: DIY Dadish; September 3, 2026
- Spin-offs: Dadish Dadish 2 Dadish 3 Daily Dadish; Dadish 3D; Dadish Collection; Dadish 4 DIY Dadish

Dadish release timeline
2020	Dadish
2021	Dadish 2
2022	Dadish 3
2023	Daily Dadish
2024	Dadish 3D, Dadish Collection
2025	Dadish 4
2026	DIY Dadish

Dadish is a video game series developed and published by Thomas K. Young and CatCup Games. The series follows a talking radish who is trying to find all of his radish children who have gone missing while encountering other food-inspired enemies trying to stop him. There are 8 games in the series, almost all being available to play on Nintendo Switch, PlayStation 4, PlayStation 5, Xbox One, Microsoft Windows, iOS, and Android. One of these games, Daily Dadish, is not available on PlayStation 4 and Xbox One.

== Dadish ==
Dadish is the first installment of the series. It was initially released on iOS on February 11, 2020, later on Android on February 22, 2020, Nintendo Switch and Poki Games on October 14, 2020, Microsoft Windows on February 22, 2021, PlayStation 4 on September 27, 2021, and Xbox One on October 26, 2021. The Nintendo Switch, Microsoft Windows, PlayStation 4, and Xbox One versions of the game had an exclusive extra world with 10 levels, Fungo Cave, but it was later added to mobile as well.

There are 50 levels spread across 5 worlds, including a boss level at the end of each world. The player plays as a talking radish dad who lost his kids due to a balloon distracting them while Dadish was asleep. Dadish navigates through the five different worlds of the game: Abaro Woods, Strando Beach, Monto Mountain, Fungo Cave, and Kastelo Fortress. Fungo Cave is only made available to mobile versions. The gameplay involves jumping across platforms and avoiding food-themed enemies. At the end of each world, Dadish fights a boss character. The final boss is Lord Durnak. Collecting all the stars unlocks play as an opossum, which does not alter any gameplay.

Game reviews
Reviewer	Rating
Metacritic	8.6/10

== Dadish 2 ==
Dadish 2 is the second installment of the series. Its initial release was on January 17, 2021, for iOS and Android. A day later, on January 18, it was added to Nintendo Switch and Poki Games. It was later added to PlayStation 4 on August 27, 2021, then to the Xbox One on October 27, 2021. The gameplay is the same as Dadish, except for a few new autoscroll levels instead of the regular 2D platforming.

Dadish 2 follows the same radish dad saving his children after bringing them to "Bring Your Kids To Work Day" goes wrong. The game consists of fifty levels spread across five worlds: Enuiga Corp, Herbejo Meadow, Koto Swamp, Fantomo Temple, and Soleca Station. Dadish reunites with Burgurgular, an ex-villain from the first game, and he is on a mission to find his lost hat. They face various fast-food themed enemies and bosses. The final boss is a showdown against Space Durnak, the final boss from the previous game. Upon collecting all the stars, the character Fowlst from CatCup Games' sister series Super Fowlst becomes playable. With this mode equipped, players are able to fly around in a Flappy Bird-like fashion.

Game reviews
Reviewer	Rating
Metacritic	8.3/10
The XBox Hub	3.5/5

== Dadish 3 ==
Dadish 3 is the third installment of the series. Its initial releases were on June 14, 2022, for all platforms.

Dadish 3 follows the same talking radish dad trying to save his radish children from a shady school field trip. The game consists of fifty levels across five worlds: Gangalo Jungle, Polvujo Desert, Rubo Sewer, Haveno Port, and Marfundo Sea. He encounters numerous food-themed enemies, including ice creams and cupcake snakes. He also reunites with his ex-wife, Momato—a tomato character who provides assistance during certain levels by giving Dadish piggyback rides. Dadish then befriends a dolphin, whose name is The Dolphin The Dolphin, who helps him navigate through water-based levels. They then meet with the final boss, Lord Kanrud, who is not related to the previous boss, Lord Durnak, but Lord Kanrud is only an alias for The Dolphin The Dolphin, who is the final boss of the game. Collecting all the stars unlocks the ability to play as Panic the Possum, a character with a much faster playstyle. You don Sonic-like shoes and collect baby possums.

Game reviews
Reviewer	Rating
Metacritic	8.6/10

== Daily Dadish ==
Daily Dadish is the fourth installment of the series. Its initial release was on January 9, 2023, for iOS and Android. It was later released on Microsoft Windows on February 7, 2023, and Nintendo Switch on August 2, 2023. Daily Dadish is meant to be played daily; every day, a level out of the 366 levels (including February 29 for leap year) will become playable for that day only. Daily Dadish follows Dadish trying to find his kids.

== Dadish 3D ==
Dadish 3D is the fifth installment of the series. Its initial release was on April 4, 2024, for iOS and Android. It was later released on Microsoft Windows and Poki on April 22, 2024, Nintendo Switch on April 23, 2024, Xbox One on August 20, 2024, and PlayStation 4 and 5 on September 2, 2024. Dadish 3D is the only 3D platformer game in the series.

Much like in the previous Dadish games, the player controls Dadish on a mission to rescue his radish kids who have disappeared. This time, they got tricked into following a fake real-life pop-up ad that told them they had won a prize. The game consists of fifty levels across five worlds: Arbareto Thicket, Kokoso Cove, Toksa Park, Pinto Peak, and Eterna Internet. A few levels have you riding on Burgugular akin to Dadish 2. Dadish faces a variety of food-theme enemies, and the final boss is Cyber Durnak, the previous boss of Dadish and Dadish 2. Upon collecting all the stars, the player unlocks the ability to play as Panic the Possum.

Game reviews
Reviewer	Rating
Metacritic	8/10

== Dadish Collection ==
Dadish Collection is the sixth installment in the series. Its initial release was on August 15, 2024, for Microsoft Windows, Nintendo Switch, iOS, and Android. Dadish Collection is a collection of Dadish, Dadish 2, and Dadish 3, combining all three games in one.

== Dadish 4 ==
Dadish 4 is the seventh installment of the series. Its initial release was on December 18, 2025, for Android, iOS, Microsoft Windows, and on Nintendo Switch. You play as Dadish's son, DJ on a mission to save Dadish, who's been kidnapped by the Homeowner's Association Eventually, Momato joins the attack against the HOA, rideable just like in Dadish 3. Burgugular levels also make a comeback, although this time he has a jetpack. The game consists of fifty levels across five worlds: Disfalanta Ruins, Ferrubejo Yard, Korodita Factory, Senfina Sky, and Brulado Pit. The final boss is Duke Curry, the president of the Homeowner's Association. Upon collecting all the stars, the player unlocks the ability to play as Dadish.

== DIY Dadish ==
DIY Dadish is the eighth and most recent game in the Franchise. It lets users create and share their own levels. It released on September 3rd for iOS and Android, with the Steam and Nintendo Switch versions coming later this month.
