= Red cabbage =

Cabbage cultivar

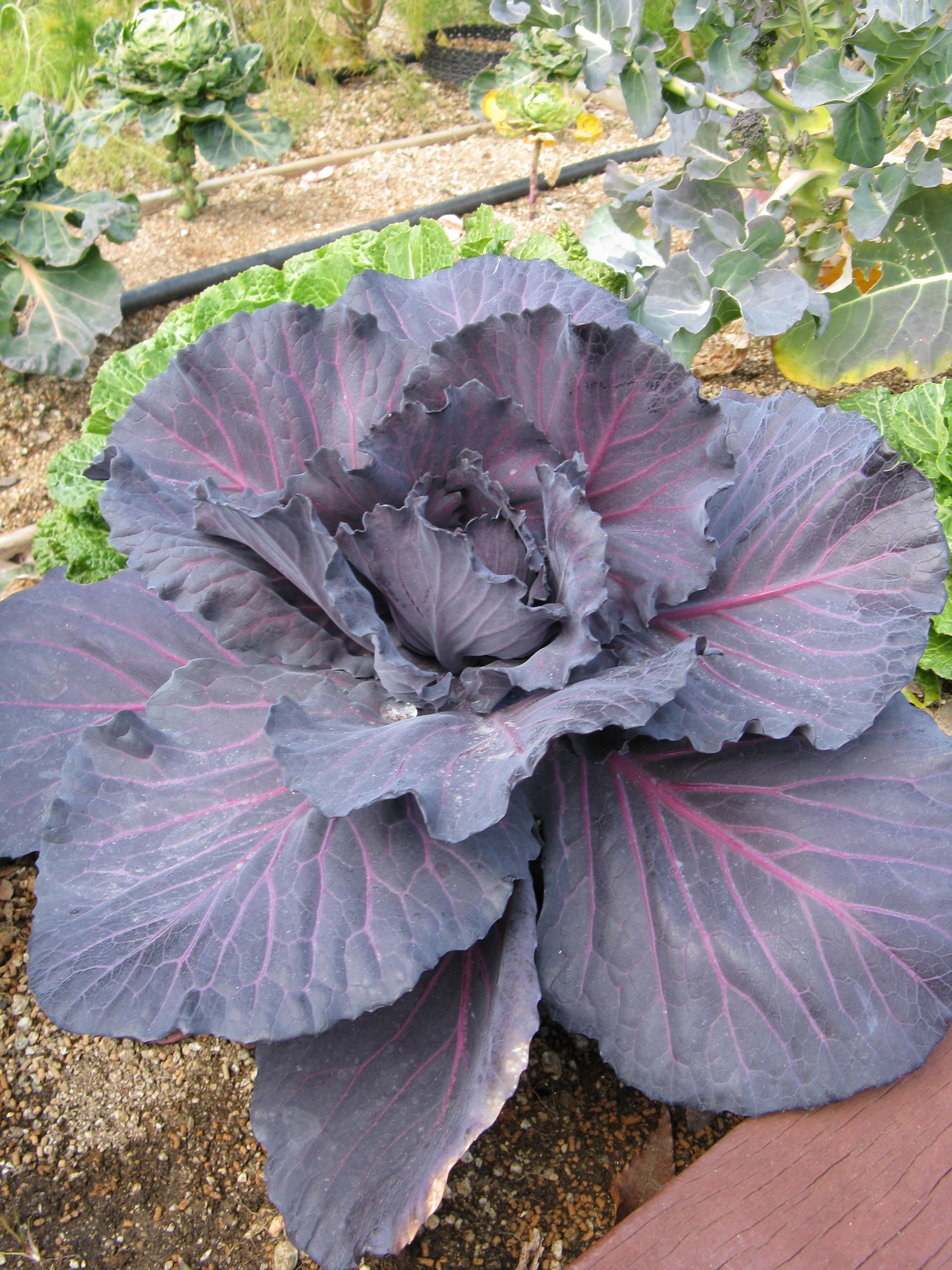
- Red cabbage plant
- Species: Brassica oleracea
- Cultivar group: Capitata Group

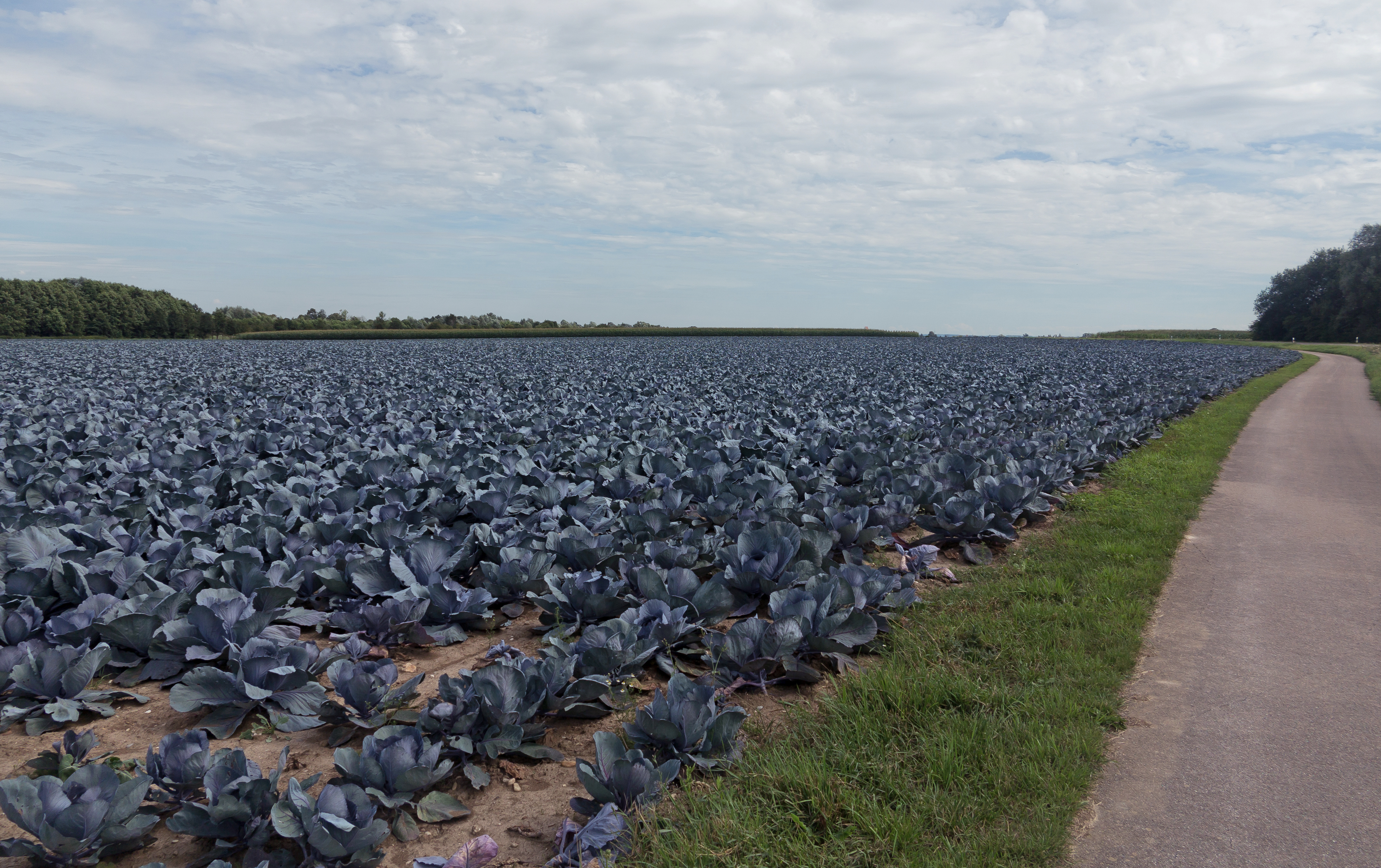
Red cabbage in panorama between Finningen and Mörslingen, Germany

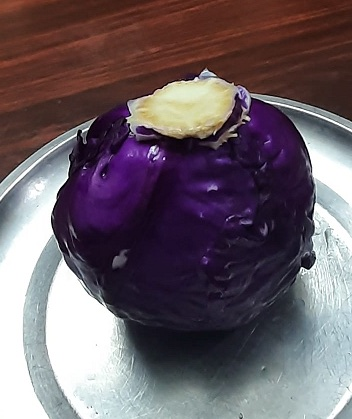
Red cabbage

Red cabbage, cooked, boiled, drained, without salt
Nutritional value per 100 g (3.5 oz)
- Energy: 122 kJ (29 kcal)
- Carbohydrates: 6.94 g
- Sugars: 3.32 g
- Dietary fibre: 2.6 g
- Fat: 0.09 g
- Protein: 1.51 g
Vitamins and minerals
Vitamins	Quantity %DV^{†}
Vitamin A equiv. beta-Carotene	0% 2 μg 0% 20 μg
Thiamine (B1)	6% 0.071 mg
Riboflavin (B2)	5% 0.06 mg
Niacin (B3)	2% 0.382 mg
Pantothenic acid (B5)	3% 0.154 mg
Vitamin B6	13% 0.225 mg
Folate (B9)	6% 24 μg
Vitamin C	38% 34.4 mg
Vitamin K	40% 47.6 μg
Minerals	Quantity %DV^{†}
Calcium	3% 42 mg
Iron	4% 0.66 mg
Magnesium	4% 17 mg
Phosphorus	3% 33 mg
Potassium	9% 262 mg
Zinc	2% 0.25 mg
- Other constituents: Quantity
- Water: 91 g
- Link to USDA Database entry
- ^{†}Percentages estimated using US recommendations for adults, except for potassium, which is estimated based on expert recommendation from the National Academies.

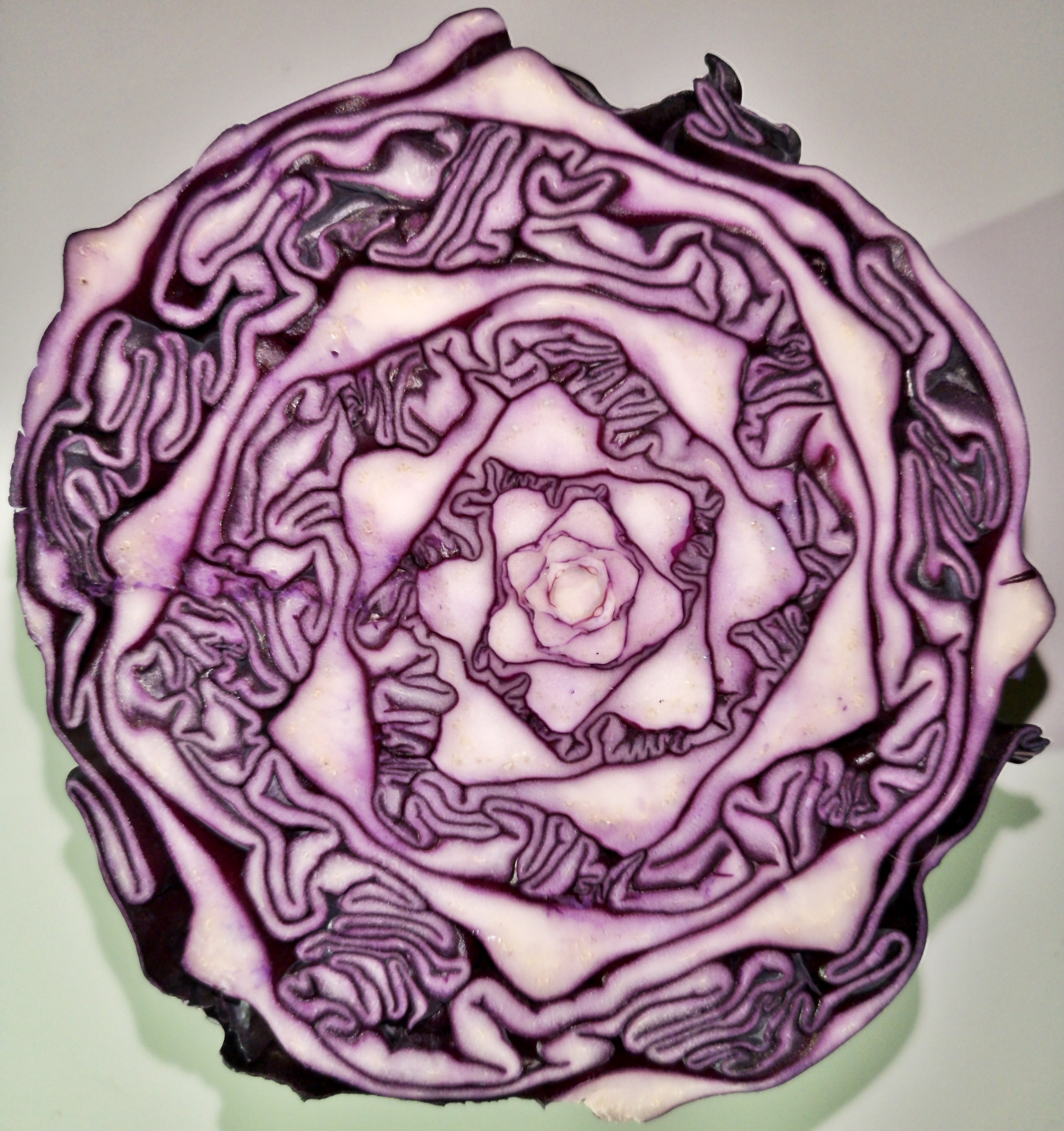
Spiral arrangement of cabbage leaf stalks, horizontal section half

The red cabbage (purple-leaved varieties of Brassica oleracea Capitata Group) is a kind of cabbage, also known as Blaukraut after preparation. Its leaves are coloured dark red/purple. However, the plant changes its colour according to the pH value of the soil due to a pigment belonging to anthocyanins.

In acidic soils, the leaves grow more reddish; in neutral soils, they will grow more purple, while an alkaline soil will produce rather greenish-yellow coloured cabbages. This explains the fact that the same plant is known by different colours in various regions. It can be found in all of Europe, throughout the Americas, in China, and especially in Africa.

The juice of red cabbage can be used as a homemade pH indicator, turning red in acid and green/yellow in basic solutions. When cooking, red cabbage will normally turn blue; adding vinegar or acidic fruit to the pot is necessary to retain the cabbage's red colour.

Red cabbage needs well-fertilized soil and sufficient humidity to grow. It is a seasonal plant that is seeded in spring and harvested in late autumn. Red cabbage is a better keeper than its "white" relatives and does not need to be converted to sauerkraut to last the winter.

== Composition ==
=== Nutrition ===
Cooked red cabbage is 91% water, 7% carbohydrates, 1% protein, and contains negligible fat (table). It has a high content of vitamin C and vitamin K, containing 44% and 72%, respectively, of the Daily Value (DV) per 100-gram amount, and is a moderate source of vitamin B6 (17% DV) (table).

=== Phytochemicals ===
Red cabbage phytochemicals include sulforaphane and other glucosinolates.

== Uses ==
=== Culinary ===
Red cabbage is often used raw for salads and coleslaw. This vegetable can be eaten cooked. It is the traditional accompanying side dish paired with many German meals, notably meat dishes like Sauerbraten or Döner. At Christmas, it can be spiced, braised, and served as an accompaniment to seasonal roast goose or turkey. Apples and a little vinegar are often added to give it a sweet and sour taste.

=== pH indicator ===
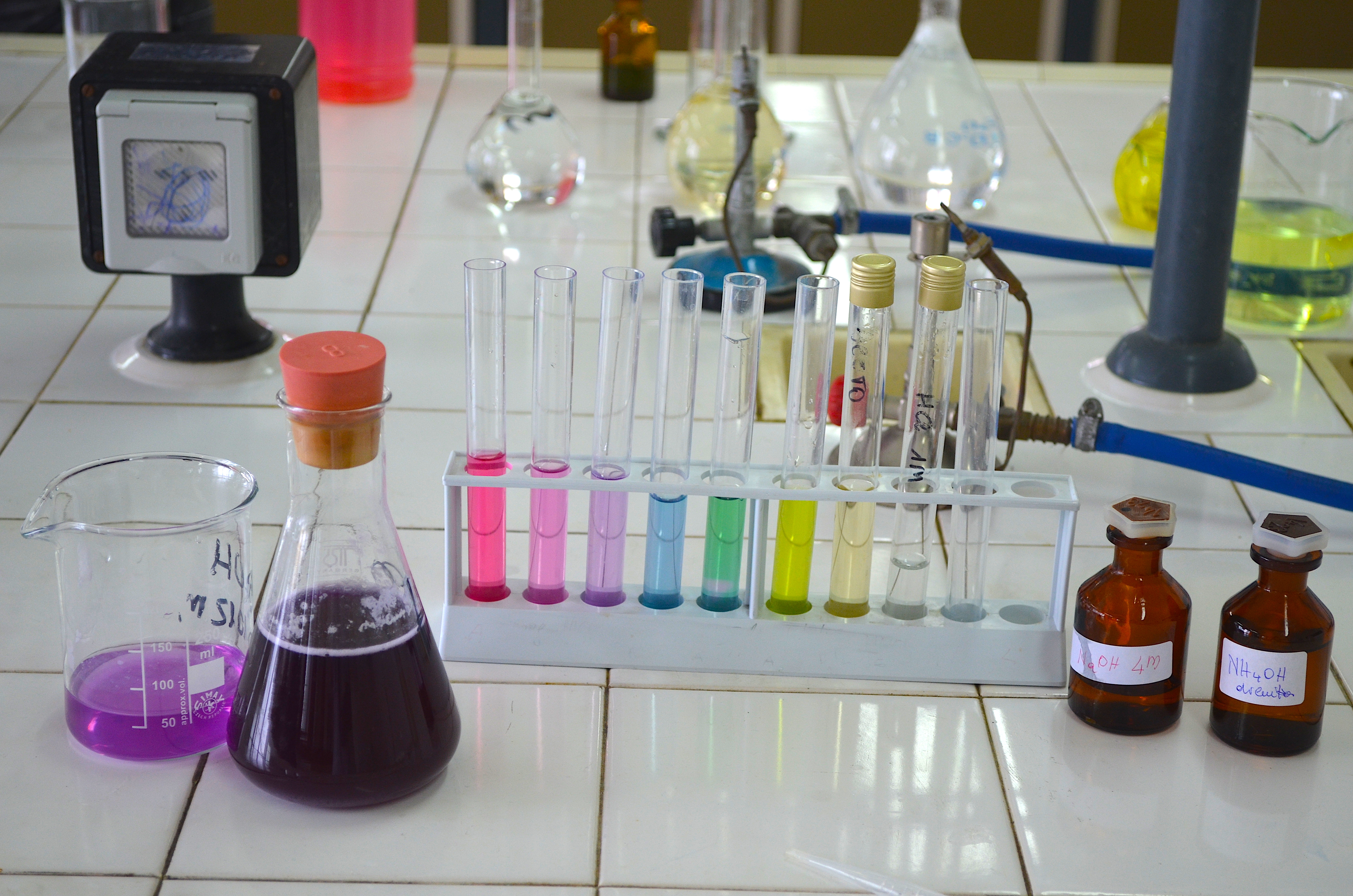
A gradient of red cabbage extract pH indicator from acidic solution on the left to basic on the right

Red cabbage contains an anthocyanin-based dye that can be used as a pH indicator. It is red, pink, or magenta in acids (pH < 7), purple in neutral solutions (pH ≈7), and ranges from blue to green to yellow in alkaline solutions (pH > 7).

== Cultivation ==
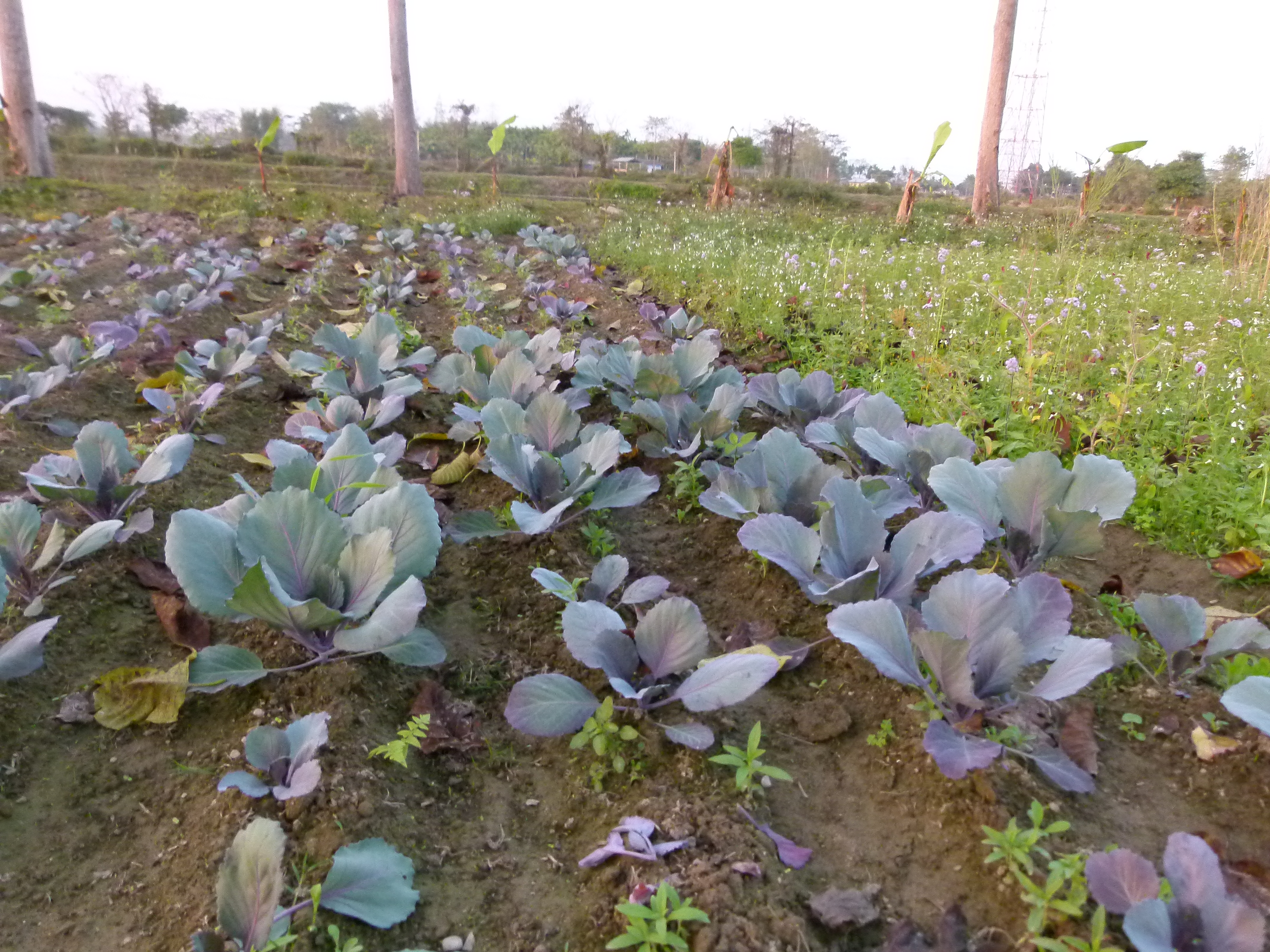
Red cabbage plantation on a farm

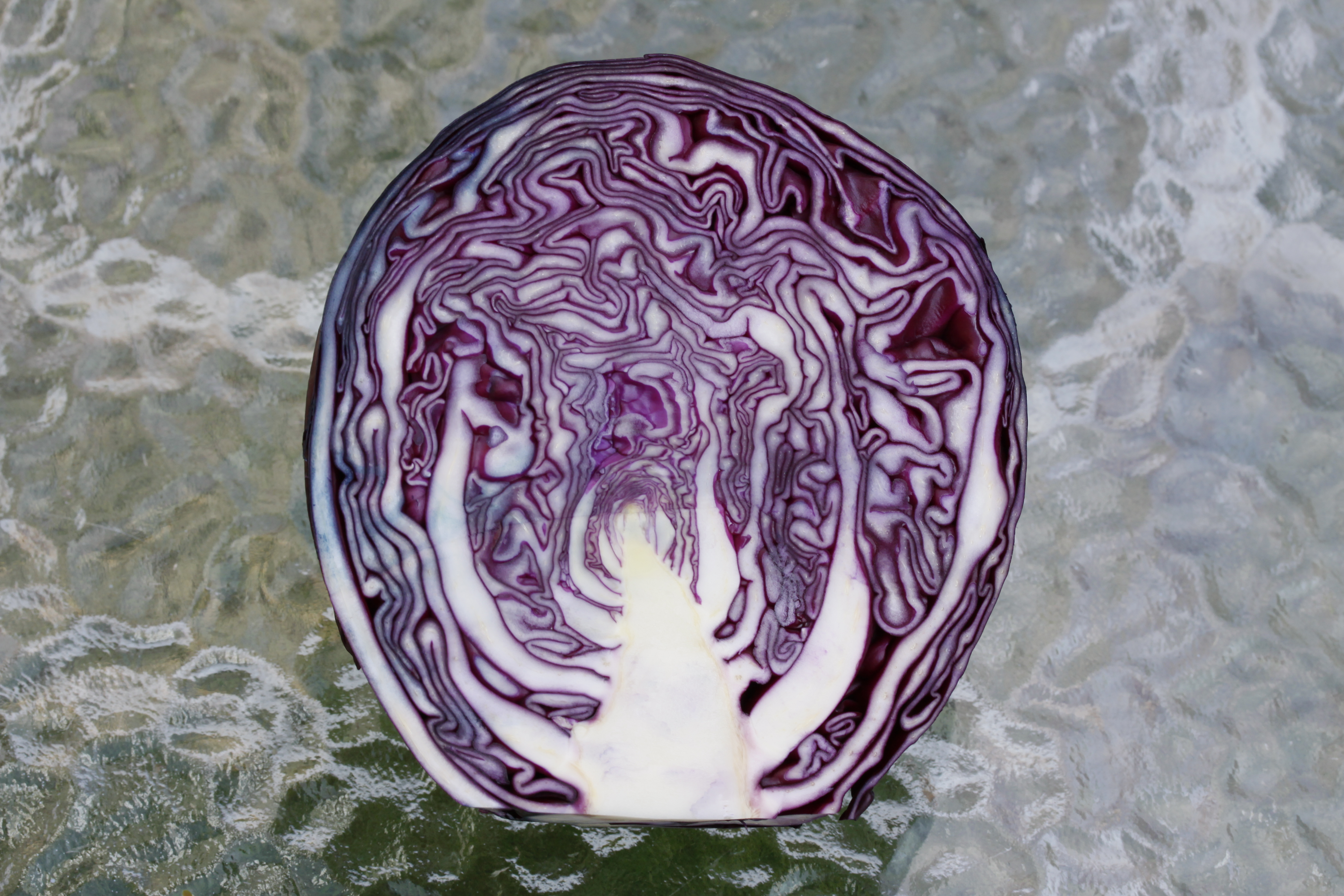
A cut red cabbage

It is recommended to start red cabbage seeds indoors four weeks before the last frost. Sow in containers that allow for the movement of water through the bottom of a cell. Popular seedling starting containers are peat pots, egg cartons, plug trays, or milk cartons. Once the seedlings grow to about 5 centimetres (2 inches) tall and have developed their first leaves, they can be hardened off and moved outside for transplanting.

Red cabbage prefers climates that remain moist and cool for most of its vegetative growth stage, so it can be placed in the ground shortly after the last frost while the spring is still cool. The cabbage plants can be spaced about 30–65 cm (12–26 in) from one another. They will need watering often but are otherwise low-maintenance plants.
