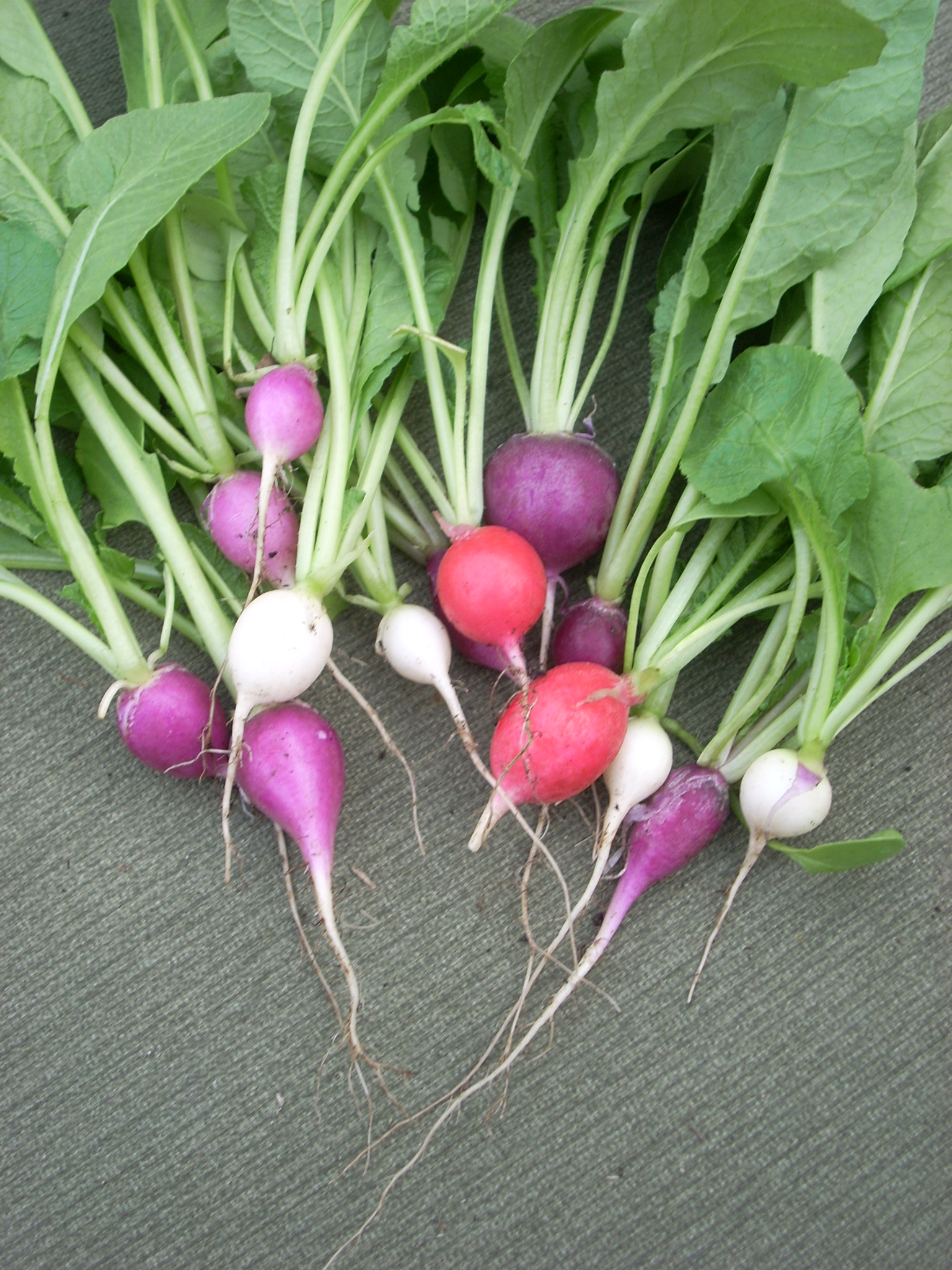

Scientific classification
- Kingdom: Plantae
- Clade: Tracheophytes
- Clade: Angiosperms
- Clade: Eudicots
- Clade: Rosids
- Order: Brassicales
- Family: Brassicaceae
- Genus: Raphanus
- Species: R. sativus

Binomial name
- Raphanus sativus L.

Synonyms
- Raphanus raphanistrum subsp. sativus L.

= Radish =

Root vegetable of the Brassicaceae family

The radish (Raphanus sativus or Raphanus raphanistrum subsp. sativus) is a flowering plant in the mustard family, Brassicaceae. Its large taproot is commonly used as a root vegetable, although the entire plant is edible and its leaves are sometimes used as a leaf vegetable. Domesticated in Asia, radishes are grown and consumed globally. The radish is sometimes considered to form a species complex with the wild radish and instead treated as the subspecies Raphanus raphanistrum subsp. sativus.

Radishes are often used raw as a crunchy salad vegetable with a pungent, slightly spicy flavor, varying in intensity depending on its growing environment. There are numerous varieties varying in size, flavor, color and length of time they take to mature. Radishes owe their sharp flavor to the various chemical compounds produced by the plants, including glucosinolate, myrosinase, and isothiocyanate. They are sometimes grown as companion plants and suffer from few pests and diseases. They germinate quickly and grow rapidly, common smaller varieties being ready for consumption within a month, while larger daikon varieties take several weeks. Being relatively easy to grow and quick to harvest, radishes are often planted by novice gardeners. Another use of radish is as a cover or catch crop in winter or as a forage crop. Some radishes are grown for their seeds; others, such as daikon, may be grown for oil production. Others are used for sprouting.

== Description ==
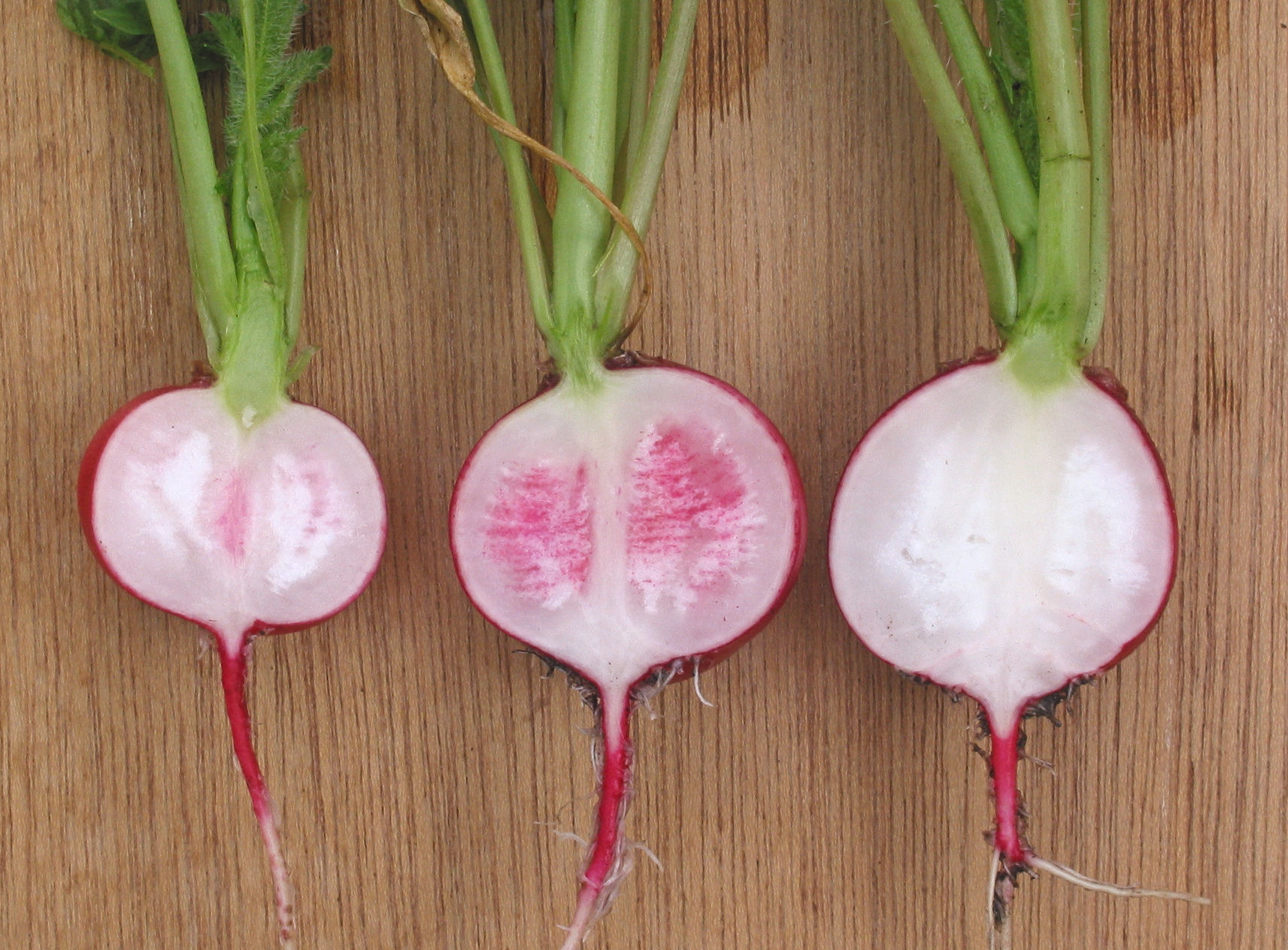
Section through red globe radishes

Radishes are annual or biennial brassicaceous crops grown for their swollen tap roots which can be globular, tapering, or cylindrical. The root skin colour ranges from white through pink, red, purple, yellow, and green to black, but the flesh is usually white. The roots obtain their color from anthocyanins. Red varieties use the anthocyanin pelargonidin as a pigment, and purple cultivars obtain their color from cyanidin. Smaller types have a few leaves about 13 centimetres (5 inches) long with round roots up to 2.5 cm (1 in) in diameter or more slender, long roots up to 7 cm (3 in) long. Both of these are normally eaten raw in salads. A longer root form, including oriental radishes, daikon or mooli, and winter radishes, grows up to 60 cm (24 in) long with foliage about 60 cm (24 in) high with a spread of 45 cm (18 in).

Radishes harvested at the proper time are crisp and mild but become bitter and tough if left in the ground too long. Leaves are arranged in a rosette. They have a lyrate shape, meaning they are divided pinnately with an enlarged terminal lobe and smaller lateral lobes. The white flowers are borne on a racemose inflorescence. The fruits are small pods which can be eaten when young.

The radish is a diploid species, and has 18 chromosomes (2n=18). It is estimated that the radish genome contains between 526 and 574 Mb.

=== Varieties ===
Cultivar	Image	Name
Red radish		Raphanus sativus var. sativus
Green radish		Raphanus sativus var. caudatus
Daikon		Raphanus sativus var. longipinnatus
Black radish		Raphanus sativus var. niger
Oilseed radish		Raphanus sativus var. oleiformis
Wild radish		Raphanus sativus var. raphanistroides

== Origins ==
Varieties of radish are now broadly distributed globally, but almost no archaeological records are available to help determine their early history and domestication. However, scientists have tentatively located the origin of Raphanus sativus in Southeast Asia, as this is the only region where truly wild forms have been discovered. South Asia, Central China, and Central Asia appear to have been secondary centers where differing forms were developed. Radishes enter the historical record in third century BC.

Greek and Roman agriculturalists of the first century AD gave details of small, large, round, long, mild, and sharp varieties. The radish seems to have been one of the first European crops introduced to the Americas. A German botanist reported radishes of 45 kilograms (100 pounds) and roughly 90 cm (3 feet) in length in 1544, although the only variety of that size today is the Japanese Sakurajima radish. The large, mild, and white East Asian form was developed in China, though it is mostly associated in the West with the Japanese daikon, owing to Japanese agricultural development and larger exports.

== Cultivation ==
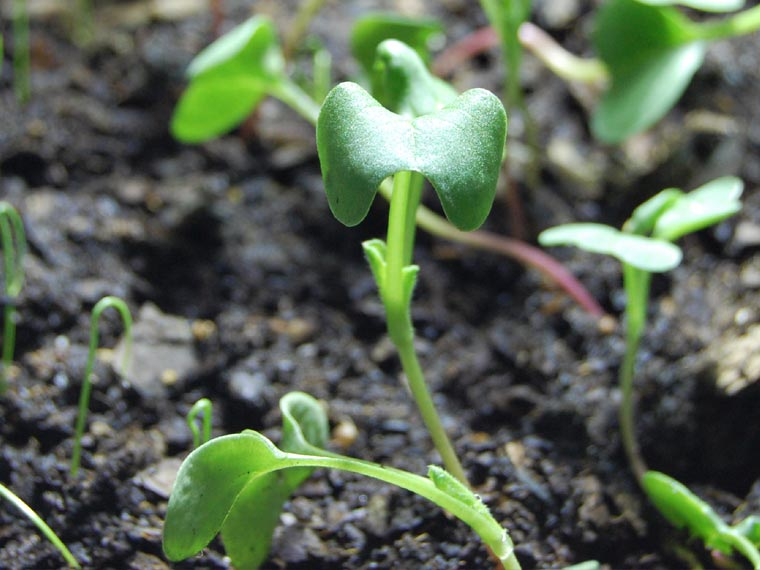
Newly germinated radishes at 10 days old

Radishes are a fast-growing, annual, cool-season crop. The seed germinates in three to four days in moist conditions with soil temperatures between 18 and 29 °C (65 and 85 °F). Best quality roots are obtained under moderate day lengths with air temperatures in the range 10 to 18 °C (50 to 65 °F). Under average conditions, the crop matures in 3–4 weeks, but in colder weather, 6–7 weeks may be required. Homegrown varieties can be significantly sharper.

Radishes grow best in full sun in light, sandy loams, with a soil pH 6.5 to 7.0, but for late-season crops, a clayey-loam is ideal. Soils that bake dry and form a crust in dry weather are unsuitable and can impair germination. Harvesting periods can be extended by making repeat plantings, spaced a week or two apart. In warmer climates, radishes are normally planted in the autumn. The depth at which seeds are planted affects the size of the root, from 1 cm (1/2 in) deep recommended for small radishes to 4 cm (1 1/2 in) for large radishes. During the growing period, the crop needs to be thinned and weeds controlled, and irrigation may be required.

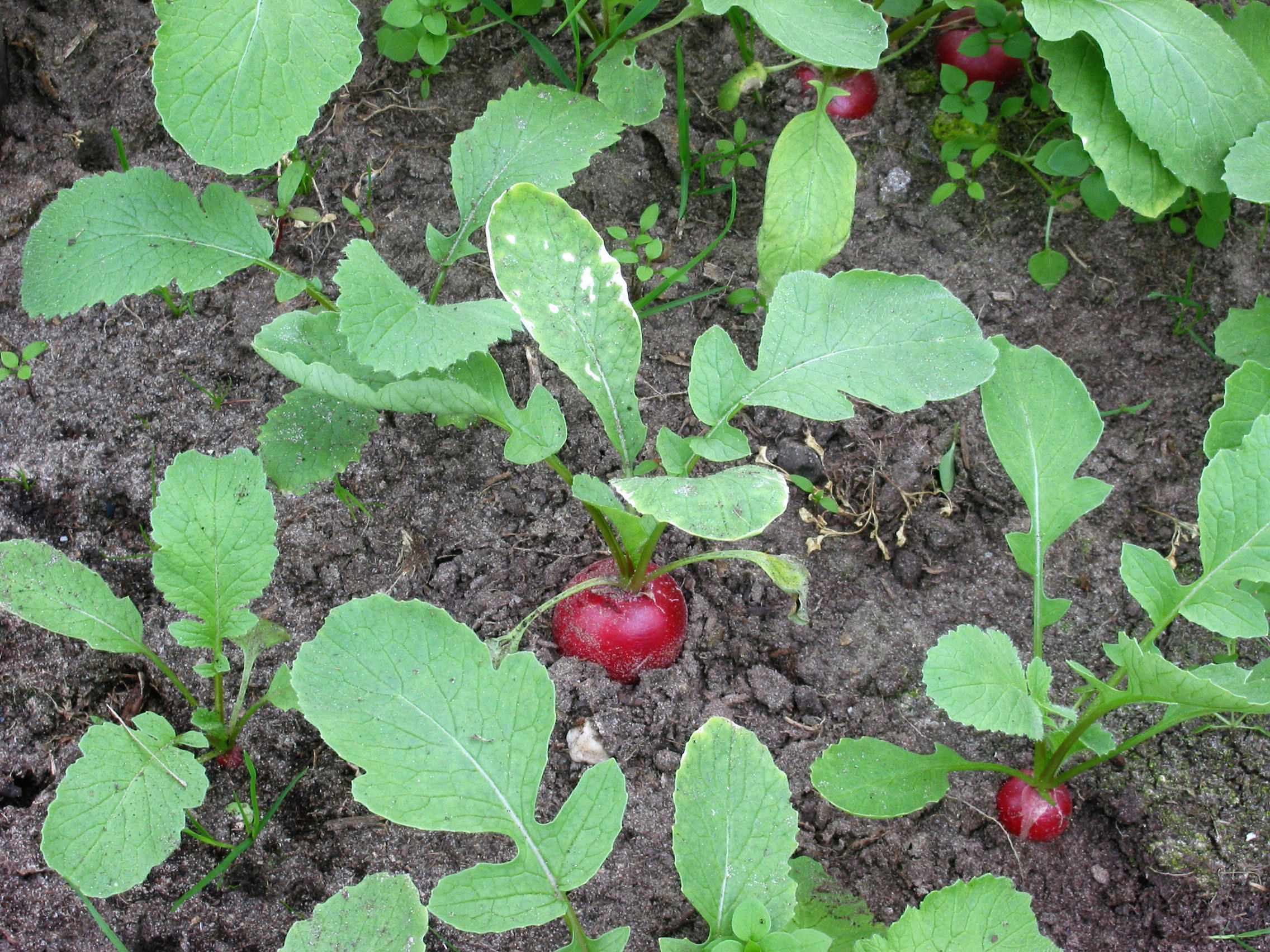
Growing radish plants

Radishes are a common garden crop in many parts of the world, and the fast harvest cycle makes them particularly suitable for children's gardens. After harvesting, radishes can be stored without loss of quality for two or three days at room temperature, and about two months at 0 °C (32 °F) with a relative humidity of 90–95%.

=== Companion plant ===
Radishes can be useful as companion plants for many other crops, probably because their pungent odour deters such insect pests as aphids, cucumber beetles, tomato hornworms, squash bugs, and ants. They can also function as a trap crop, luring insect pests away from the main crop. Cucumbers and radishes seem to thrive when grown in close association with each other, and radishes also grow well with chervil, lettuce, peas, and nasturtiums. However, they react adversely to growing in close association with hyssop.

=== Pests ===
As a fast-growing plant, diseases are not generally a problem with radishes, but some insect pests can be a nuisance. The larvae of flea beetles live in the soil, but the adult beetles cause damage to the crop, biting small "shot holes" in the leaves, especially of seedlings. The swede midge (Contarinia nasturtii) attacks the foliage and growing tip of the plant and causes distortion, multiple (or no) growing tips, and swollen or crinkled leaves and stems. The larvae of the cabbage root fly sometimes attack the roots. The foliage droops and becomes discoloured, and small, white maggots tunnel through the root, making it unattractive or inedible.

=== Varieties and cultivars ===
Radishes can be categorized into four main types according to the seasons when they are grown and a variety of shapes, lengths, colors, and sizes, such as red, pink, white, gray-black, or yellow radishes, with round or elongated roots that can grow longer than a parsnip.

==== Spring or summer radishes ====
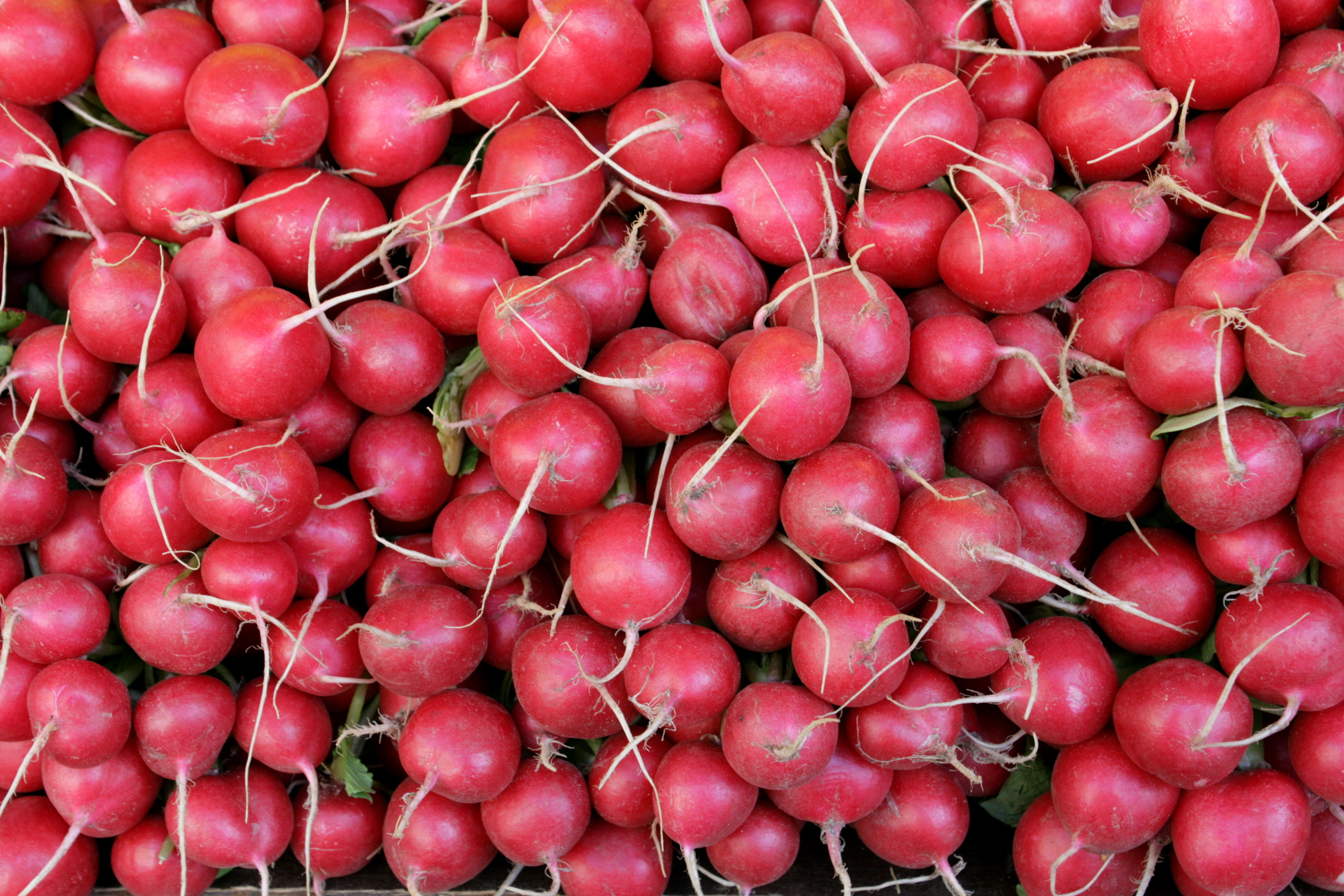
European radishes (Raphanus sativus)

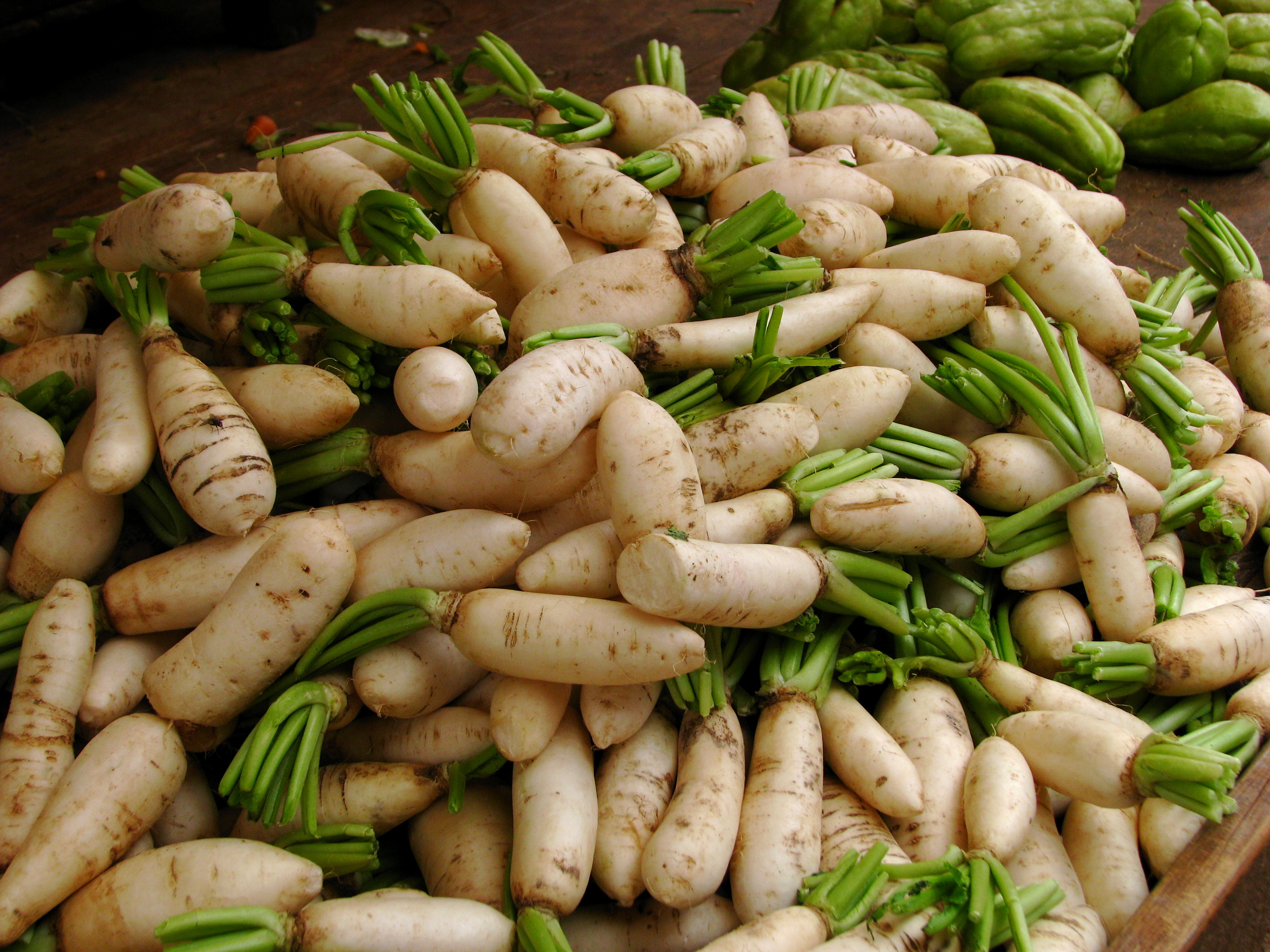
Daikon (or bai luobo)—a large East Asian white radish—for sale in India

Sometimes referred to as European radishes or spring radishes if they are planted in cooler weather, summer radishes are generally small and have a relatively short three- to four-week cultivation time.

- The 'April Cross' is a giant white radish hybrid that bolts very slowly.
- 'Bunny Tail' is an heirloom variety from Italy, where it is known as Rosso Tondo A Piccola Punta Bianca. It is slightly oblong, mostly red, with a white tip.
- 'Cherry Belle' is a bright red-skinned round variety with a white interior. It is familiar in North American supermarkets.
- 'Champion' is round and red-skinned like the 'Cherry Belle', but with slightly larger roots, up to 5 cm (2 in), and a milder flavor.
- 'Red King' has a mild flavor, with good resistance to club root, a problem that can arise from poor drainage.
- 'Sicily Giant' is a large heirloom variety from Sicily. It can reach up to 5 cm (2 in) in diameter.
- 'Snow Belle' is an all-white variety of radish, similar in shape to the 'Cherry Belle'.
- 'White Icicle' or 'Icicle' is a white carrot-shaped variety, around 10–12 cm (4–5 in) long, dating back to the 16th century. It slices easily and has better than average resistance to pithiness.
- 'French Breakfast' is an elongated, red-skinned radish with a white splash at the root end. It is typically slightly milder than other summer varieties but is among the quickest to turn pithy.
- 'Plum Purple', a purple-fuchsia radish, tends to stay crisp longer than average.
- 'Gala' and 'Roodbol' are two varieties popular in the Netherlands in a breakfast dish, thinly sliced on buttered bread.
- 'Easter Egg' is not an actual variety, but a mix of varieties with different skin colors, typically including white, pink, red, and purple radishes. Sold in markets or seed packets under the name, the seed mixes can extend harvesting duration from a single planting, as different varieties may mature at different times.

==== Winter varieties ====
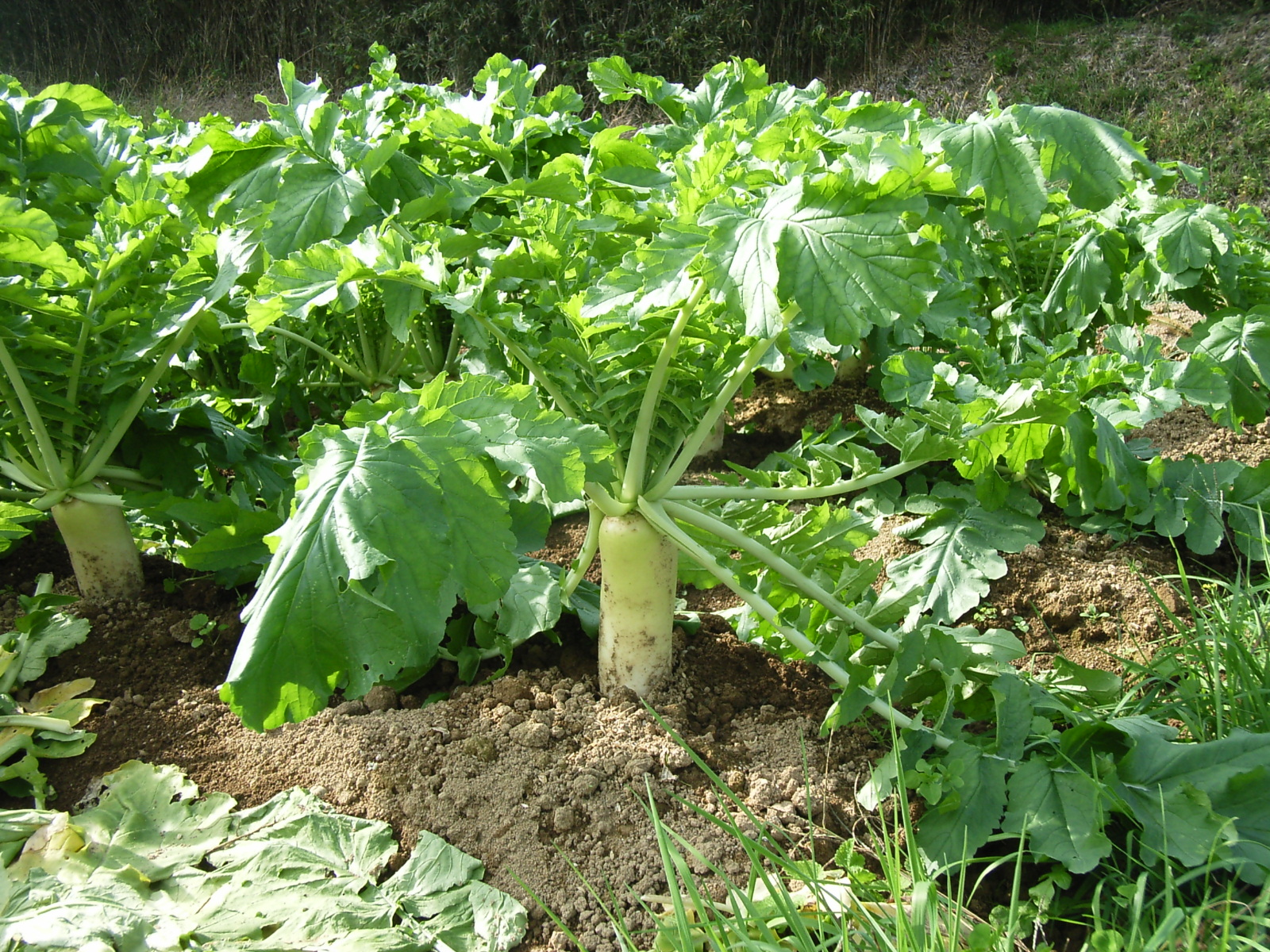
Daikon

'Black Spanish' or 'Black Spanish Round' occur in both round and elongated forms, and are sometimes simply called the black radish (Raphanus sativus L. var. niger (M.) S.K. or L. ssp. niger (M.). D.C. var. albus D.C) or known by the French name Gros Noir d'Hiver. It dates in Europe to 1548, and was a common garden variety in England and France during the early 19th century. It has a rough, black skin with hot-flavored, white flesh, is round or irregularly pear shaped, and grows to around 10 cm (4 in) in diameter.

Daikon refers to a wide variety of winter oilseed radishes from Asia. While the Japanese name daikon has been adopted in English, it is also sometimes called the Japanese radish, Chinese radish, Oriental radish, or mooli (in India and South Asia, or UK) Daikons commonly have elongated white roots, although many varieties of daikon exist. One well-known variety is 'April Cross', with smooth white roots. The New York Times describes 'Masato Red' and 'Masato Green' varieties as extremely long, well-suited for fall planting and winter storage. The Sakurajima radish is a hot-flavored variety which is typically grown to around 10 kg (22 lb), but which can grow to 30 kg (66 lb) when left in the ground.

Korean radish, also called mu (무), is a variety of white radish with firm crunchy texture. Although mu is also a generic term for radishes in Korean (as daikon is a generic term for radishes in Japanese), the word is usually used in its narrow sense, referring to Joseon radish(조선무, Joseonmu). In Korean cuisine context, the word Joseon is often used in contrast to Wae, to distinguish Korean varieties from Japanese ones. The longer, thinner, and waterier Japanese daikon cultivated mainly for danmuji is referred to as Wae radish(왜무, Waemu) in Korea. Korean radishes are generally shorter, stouter, and sturdier than daikon, and have pale green shade halfway down from the top. They also have stronger flavour, denser flesh, and softer leaves. The greens of Korean radishes are called mucheong(무청) and used as vegetable in various dishes.

==== Seed pod varieties ====
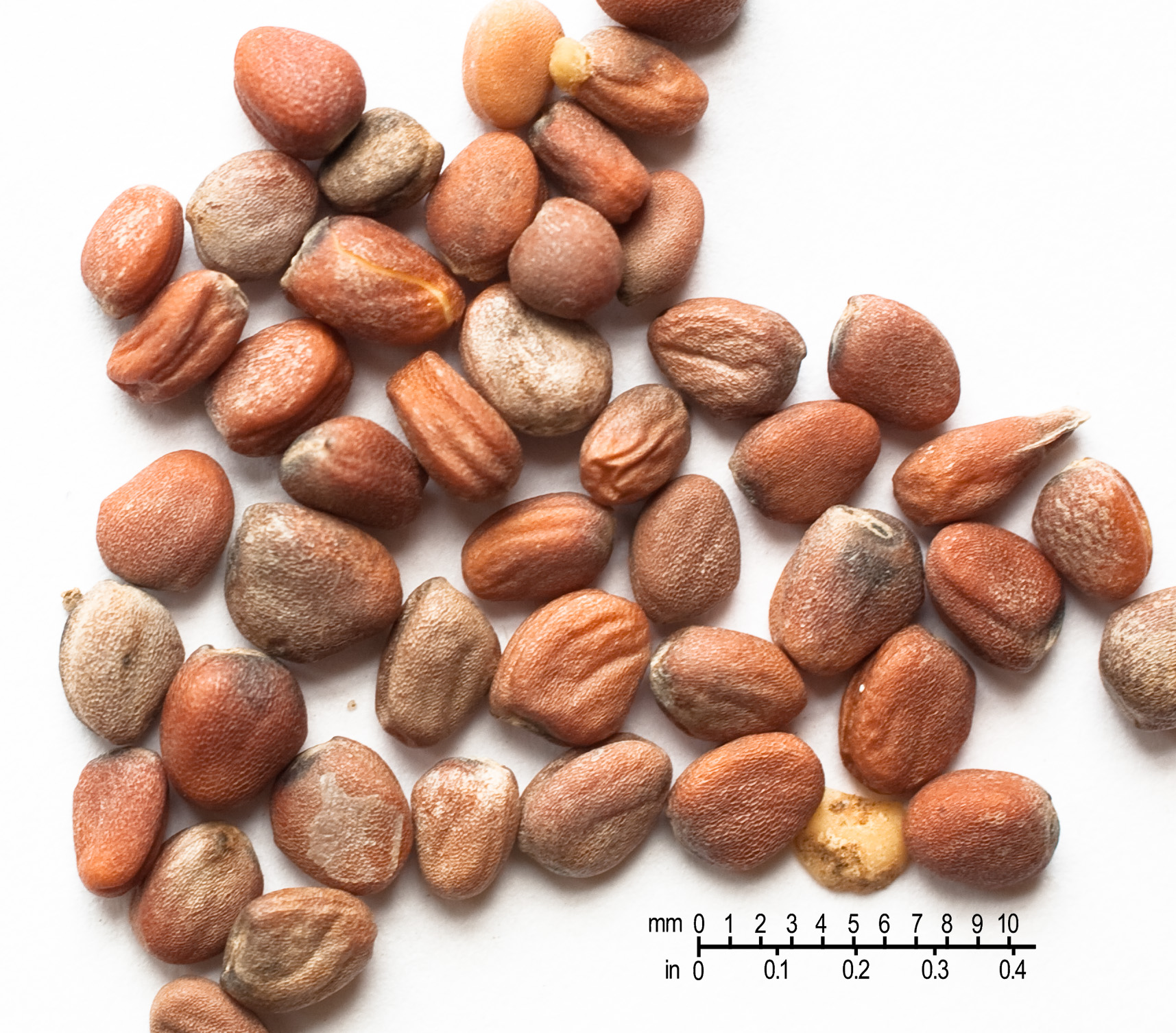
Radish seeds

The seeds of radishes grow in siliques (widely referred to as "pods"), following flowering that happens when left to grow past their normal harvesting period. The seeds are edible and are sometimes used as a crunchy, sharp addition to salads. Some varieties are grown specifically for their seeds or seed pods, rather than their roots. The rat-tailed radish, an old European variety thought to have originated from East Asia centuries ago, has long, thin, curly pods that can exceed 20 cm (8 in) in length. In the 17th century, the pods were often pickled and served with meat. The 'München Bier' variety supplies seed pods that are sometimes served raw as an accompaniment to beer in Germany.

=== Production ===
Using 2003–2004 data, several sources report annual world production of radishes to be about 7 million tonnes, produced mainly by China, Japan, and South Korea, and representing roughly 2% of global vegetable production.

== Uses ==
=== Nutrition ===
Radishes, raw
Nutritional value per 100 g (3.5 oz)
- Energy: 66 kJ (16 kcal)
- Carbohydrates: 3.4 g
- Sugars: 1.86 g
- Dietary fiber: 1.6 g
- Fat: 0.1 g
- Protein: 0.68 g
Vitamins and minerals
Vitamins	Quantity %DV^{†}
Thiamine (B1)	1% 0.012 mg
Riboflavin (B2)	3% 0.039 mg
Niacin (B3)	2% 0.254 mg
Pantothenic acid (B5)	3% 0.165 mg
Vitamin B6	4% 0.071 mg
Folate (B9)	6% 25 μg
Vitamin C	16% 14.8 mg
Minerals	Quantity %DV^{†}
Calcium	2% 25 mg
Iron	2% 0.34 mg
Magnesium	2% 10 mg
Manganese	3% 0.069 mg
Phosphorus	2% 20 mg
Potassium	8% 233 mg
Zinc	3% 0.28 mg
- Other constituents: Quantity
- Water: 95.3 g
- Full Link to USDA Database entry
- ^{†}Percentages estimated using US recommendations for adults, except for potassium, which is estimated based on expert recommendation from the National Academies.

In a 100-gram (3 1/2-ounce) reference serving, raw radishes provide 66 kilojoules (16 kilocalories) of food energy and have a moderate amount of vitamin C (18% of Daily Value), with other essential nutrients in low content. A raw radish is 95% water, 3% carbohydrates, 1% protein, and has negligible fat.

=== Culinary ===
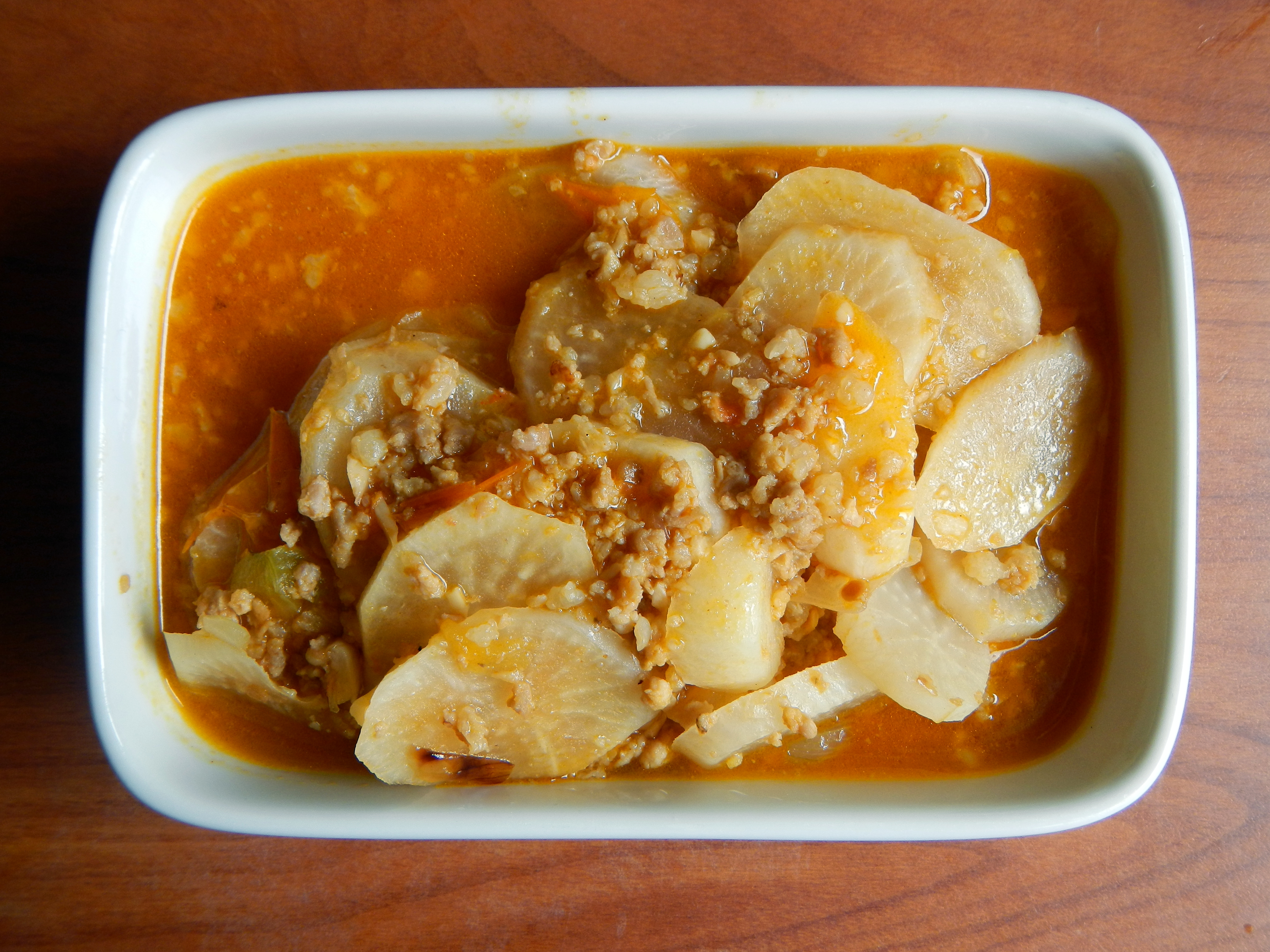
Filipino dish, Ginisang Labanos with ground beef

The most commonly eaten portion is the napiform or fusiform taproot, although the entire plant is edible and the tops can be used as a leaf vegetable. The seed can also be sprouted and eaten raw in a similar way to a mung bean.

The root of the radish is usually eaten raw, although tougher specimens can be steamed or roasted. The raw flesh has a crisp texture and a pungent, peppery flavor, caused by glucosinolates and the enzyme myrosinase, which combine when chewed to form allyl isothiocyanates, also present in mustard, horseradish, and wasabi.

Radishes are mostly used in salads but also appear in many European dishes. They are also paired with butter as an appetizer, which is often accompanied by salt and bread or crackers. In Mexican cuisine, sliced radishes are used in combination with shredded lettuce as garnish for traditional dishes such as tostadas, sopes, enchiladas and pozole.

Radish greens are usually discarded, but are edible and nutritious, and can be prepared in several ways. The leaves are sometimes used in recipes, like potato soup or as a sauteed side dish. They are also found blended with fruit juices in some recipes.

In Indian cuisine the seed pods are called "moongra" or "mogri" and can be used in many dishes.

=== Other uses ===
The seeds of radishes can be pressed to extract radish seed oil. Wild radish seeds contain up to 48% oil, which is not suitable for human consumption but is a potential source of biofuel. The daikon grows well in cool climates and, apart from its industrial use, can be used as a cover crop, grown to increase soil fertility, to scavenge nutrients, suppress weeds, help alleviate soil compaction, and prevent winter erosion of the soil.

"Radi", a spiral-cut radish, served with salt and occasionally chives, is traditionally served with beer at the Bavarian Oktoberfest.

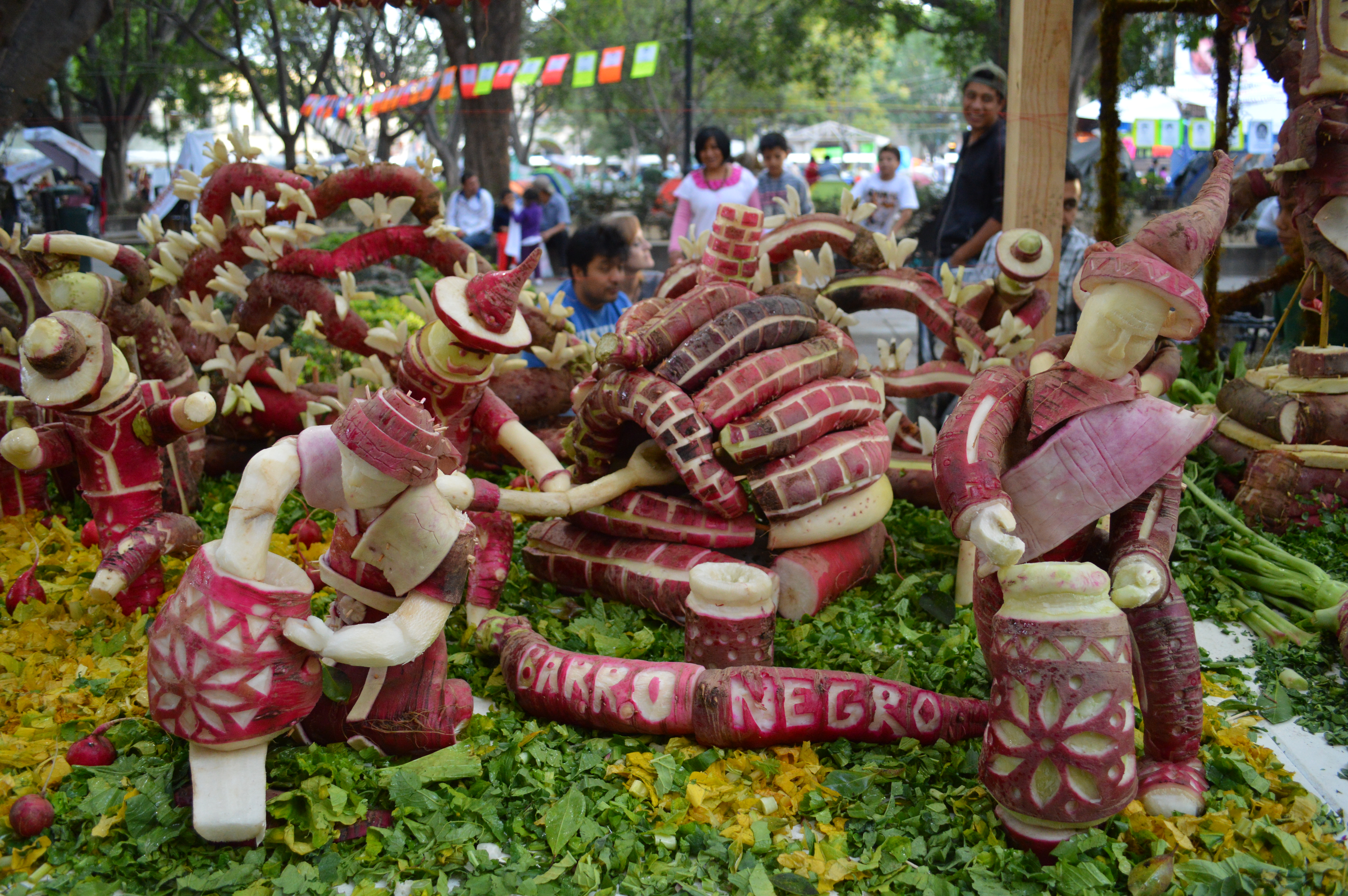
"Arte y Cultura de Oaxaca" by Jose Maria Ramirez Vasquez at the 2014 Night of the Radishes, with radishes sculptures depicting artisans creating barro negro pottery

== In culture ==
Asaph the Jew noted that the radish, particularly its leaves, may be useful in traditional medicine to increase mucus. During the Middle Ages, Ibn Wahshiyya considered it a component of poison antidotes, while Maimonides highlighted its possible uses as a treatment. Ibn Sayyar al-Warraq's 10th-century cookbook includes radish as a side dish for ostrich meat and an ingredient in a chicken dish called kardanāj.

The daikon varieties of radish are important parts of East, Southeast, and South Asian cuisine. In Japan and Korea, radish dolls are sometimes made as children's toys. Daikon is also one of the plants that make up the Japanese Festival of Seven Herbs (Nanakusa no sekku) on the seventh day after the new year.

Citizens of Oaxaca, Mexico, celebrate the Night of the Radishes (Noche de los rábanos) on December 23 as a part of Christmas celebrations. This folk art competition uses a large type of radish up to 50 cm (20 in) long and weighing up to 3 kg (7 lb). Great skill and ingenuity are used to carve these into religious and popular figures, buildings, and other objects, and they are displayed in the town square.

== Gallery ==
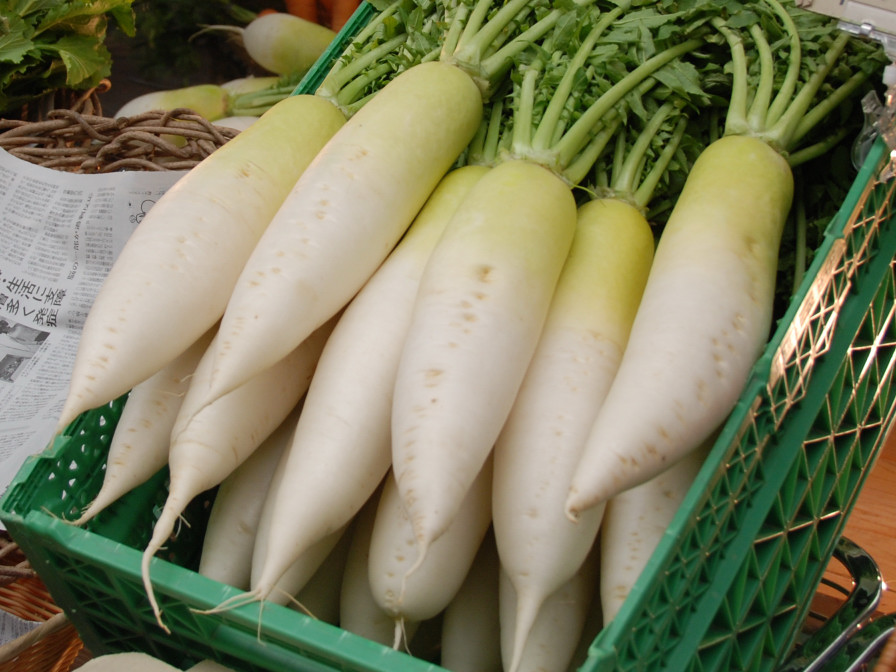
Daikon

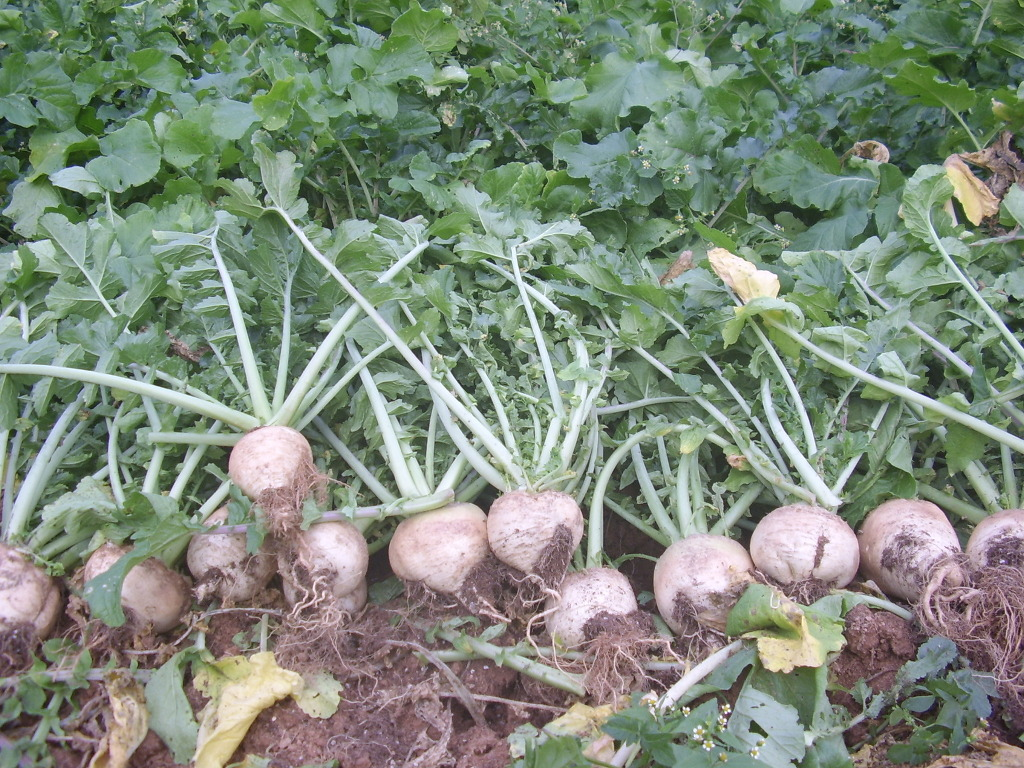
Gegeol radish

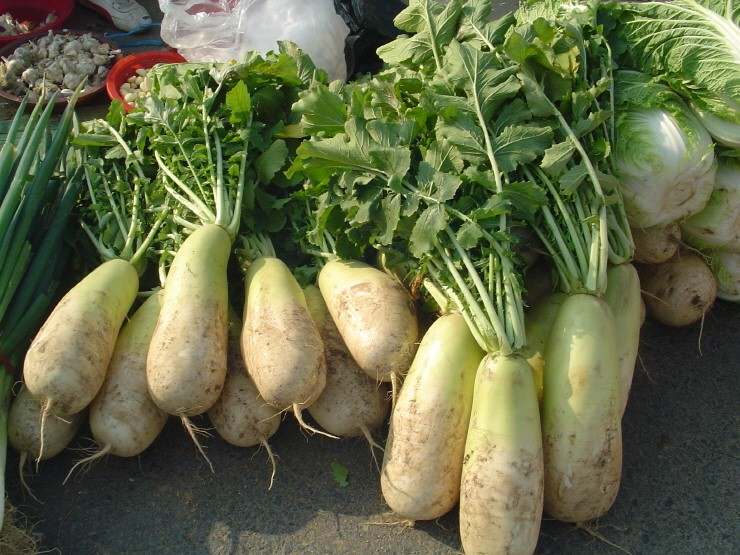
Korean radish

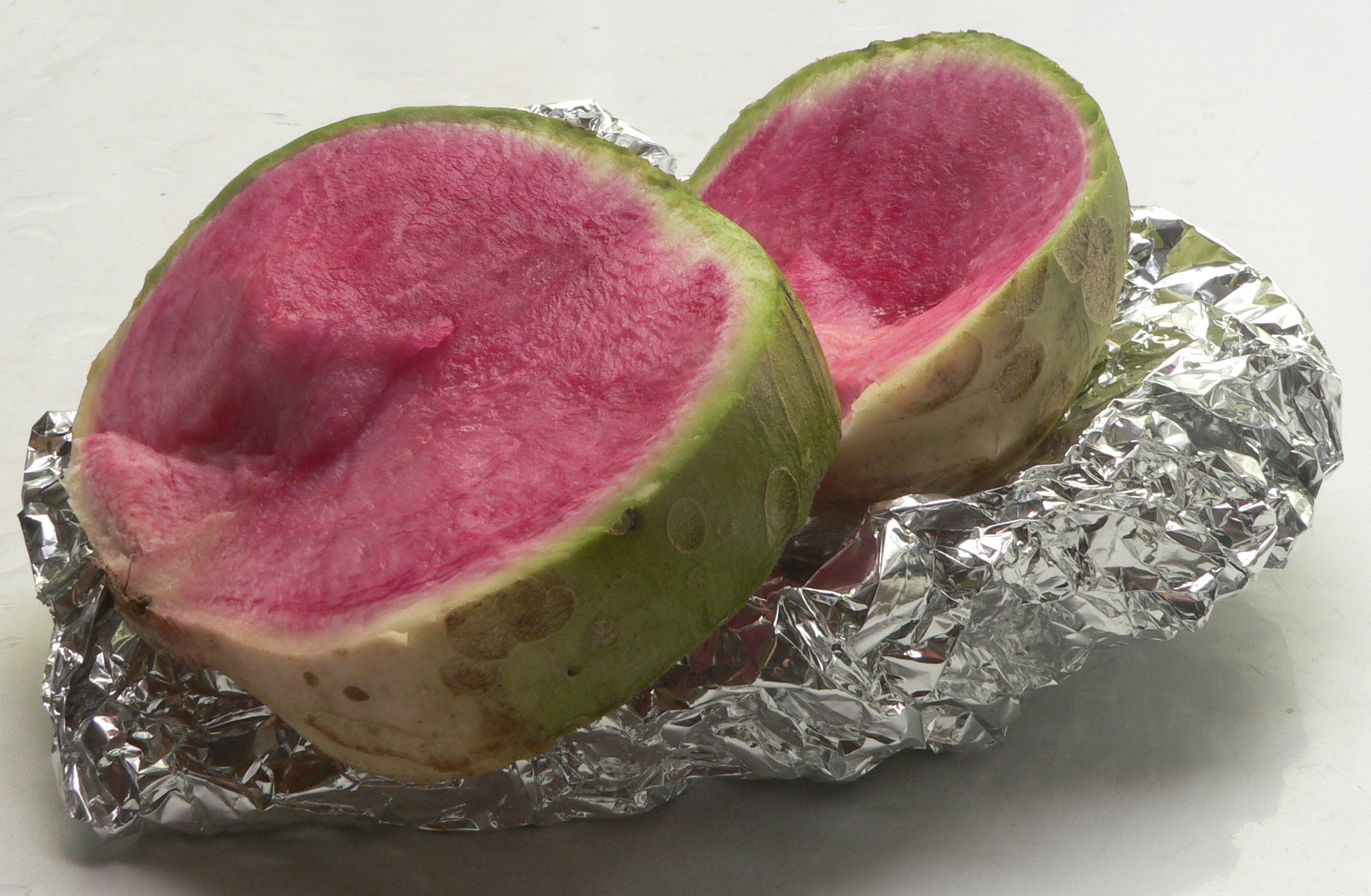
Watermelon radish

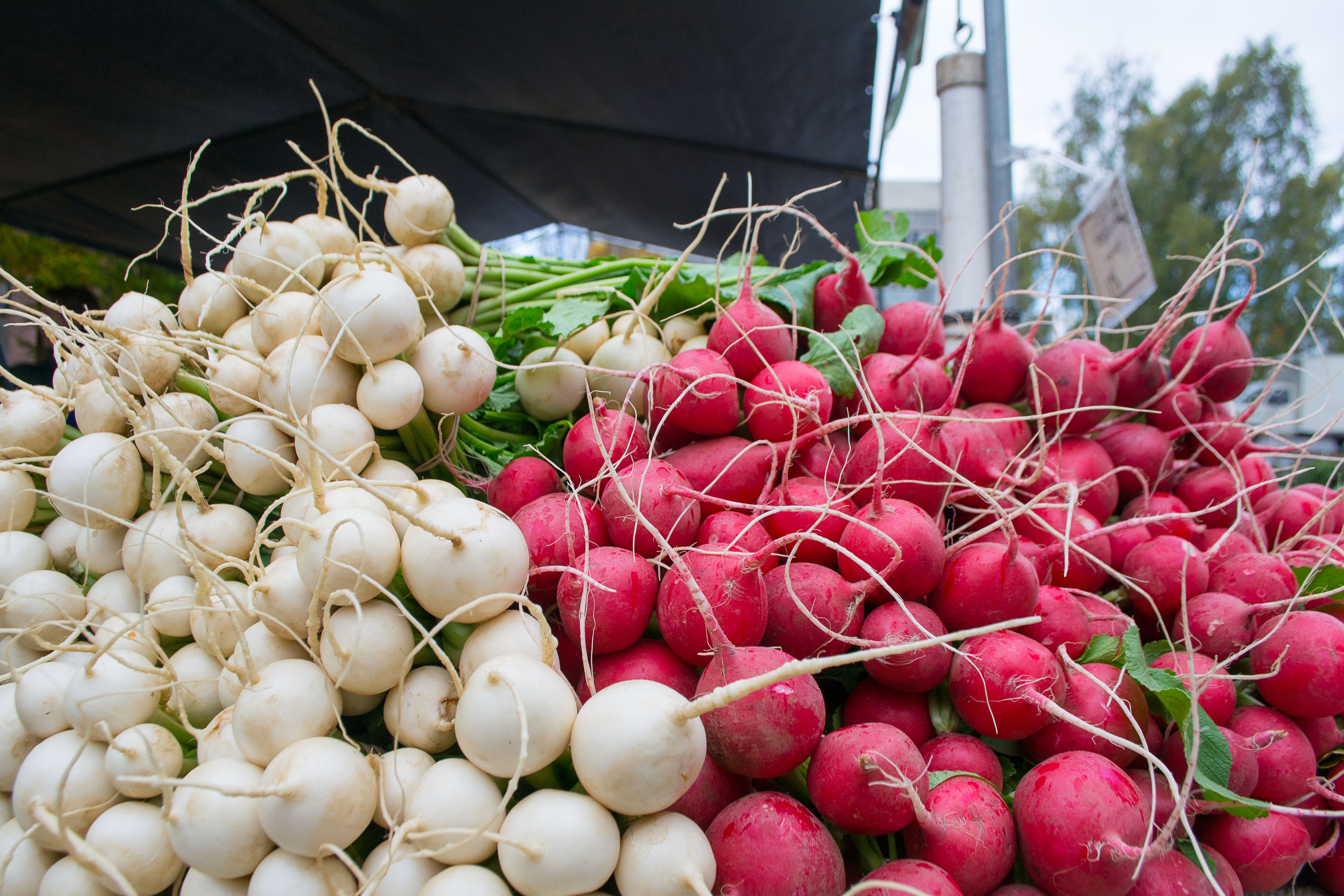
White and red

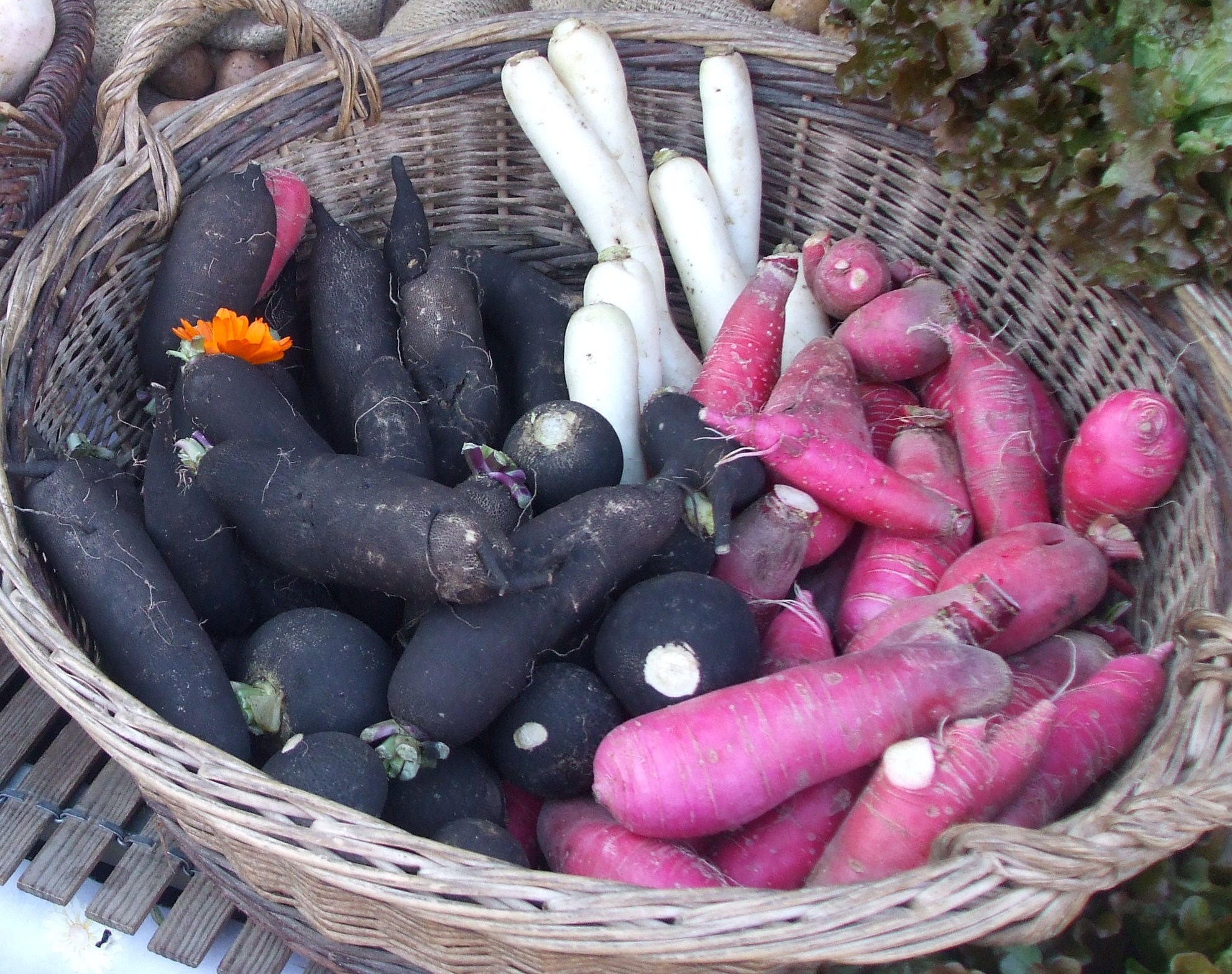
Black, white and red

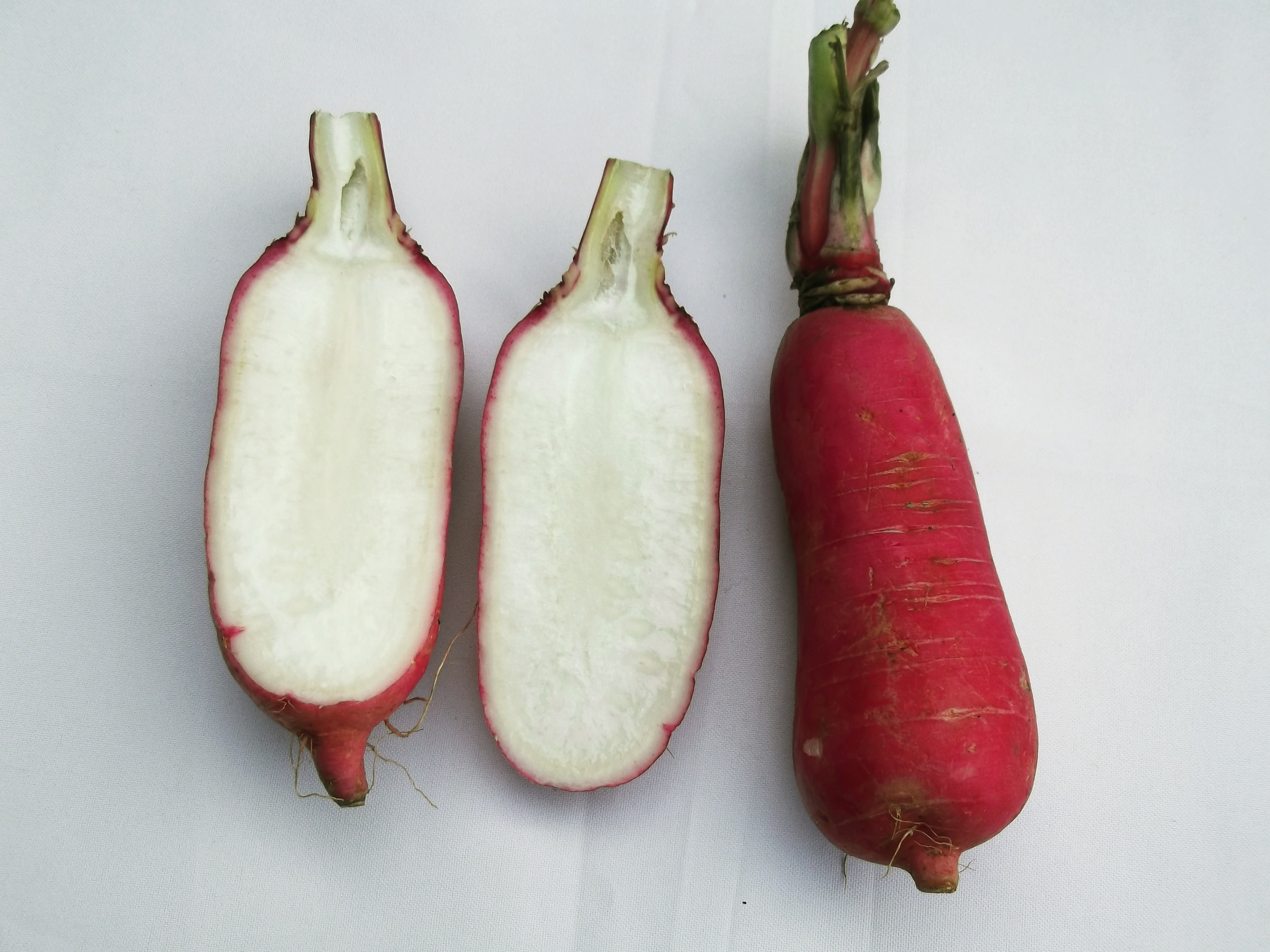
Sliced red

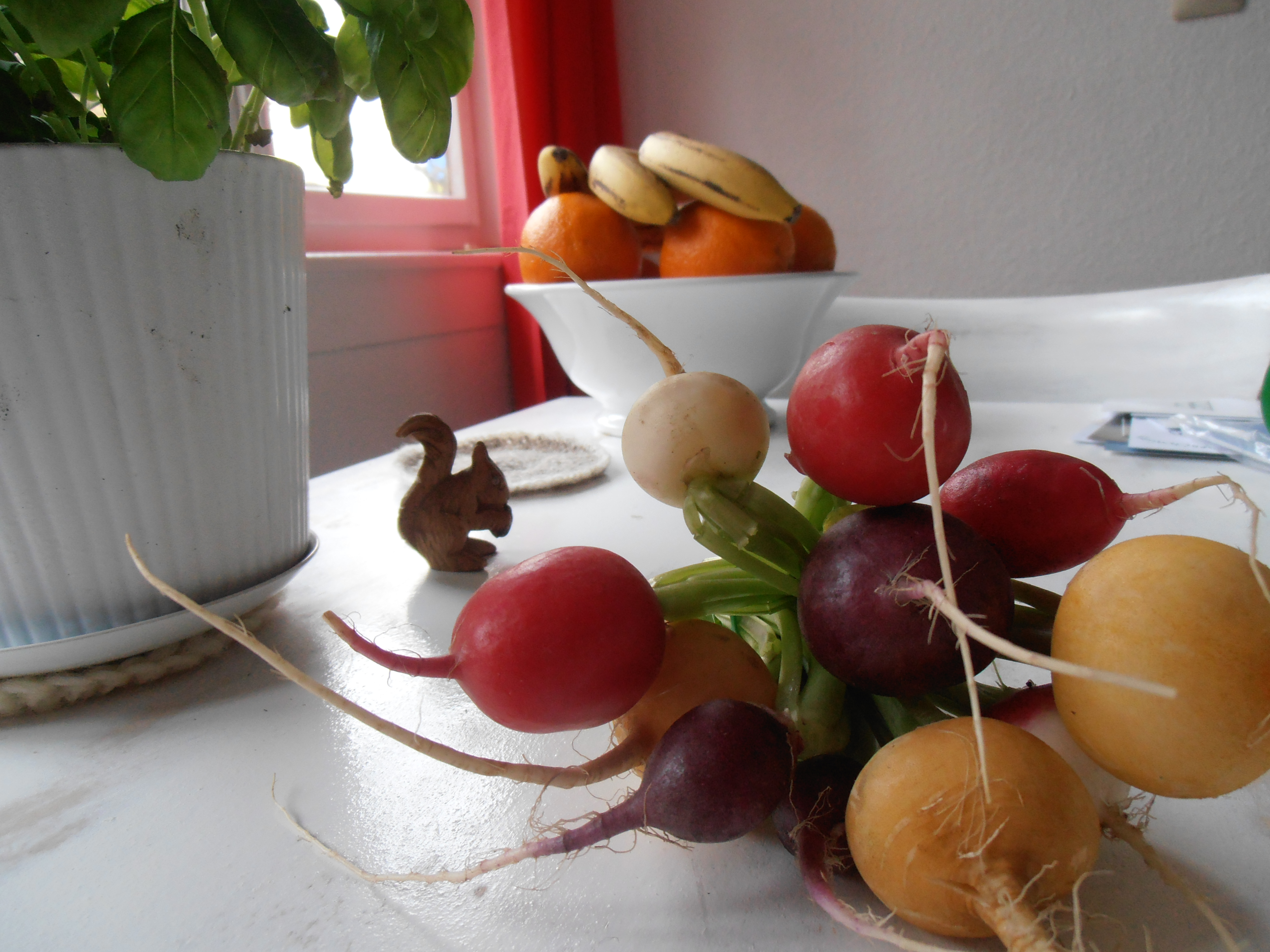
Multiple colors

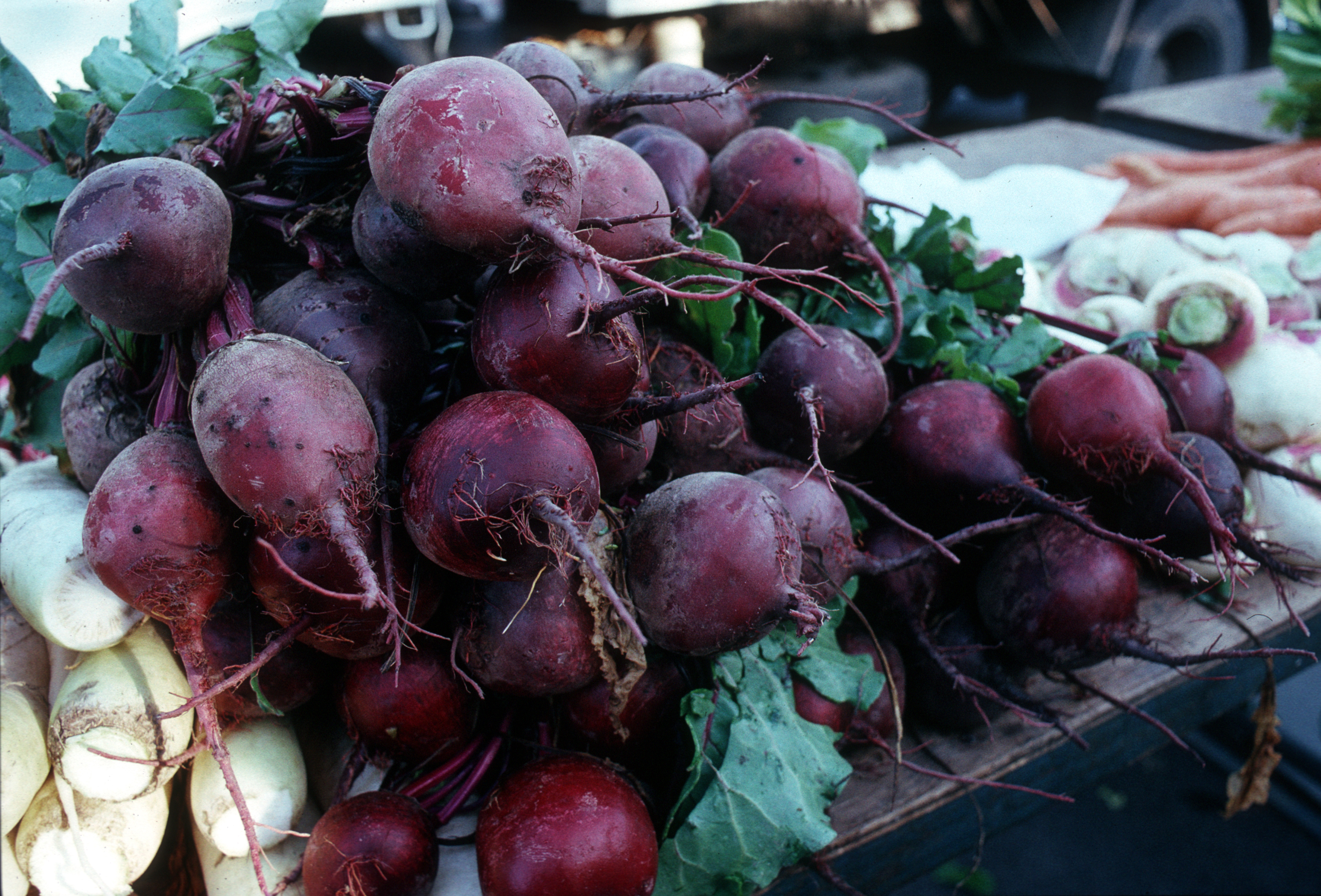
Dark red

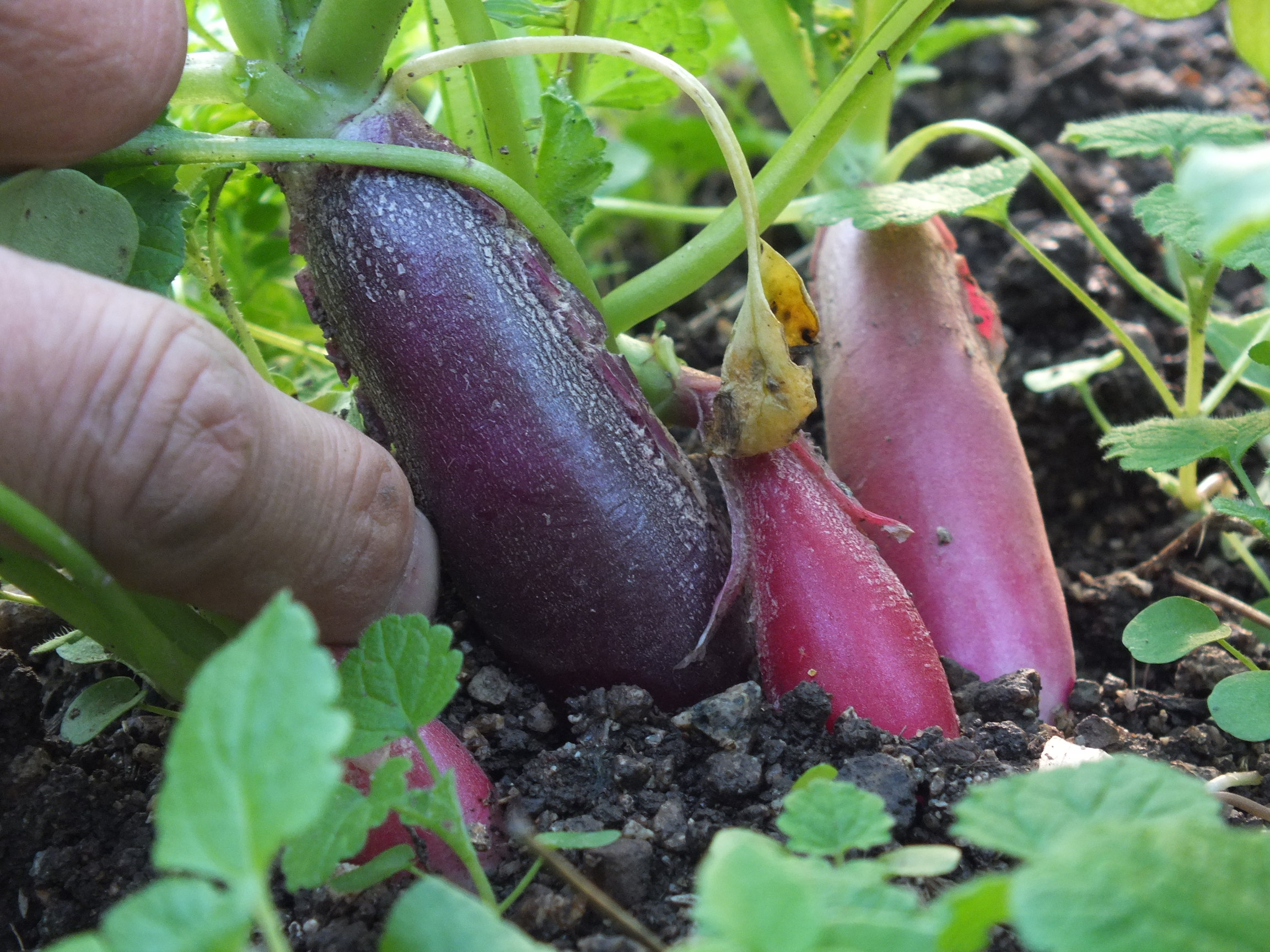
Harvesting red

== See also ==
- Raphanin
- Turnip – Type of root vegetable
- Dadish – Video game series
