= Sulforaphane =

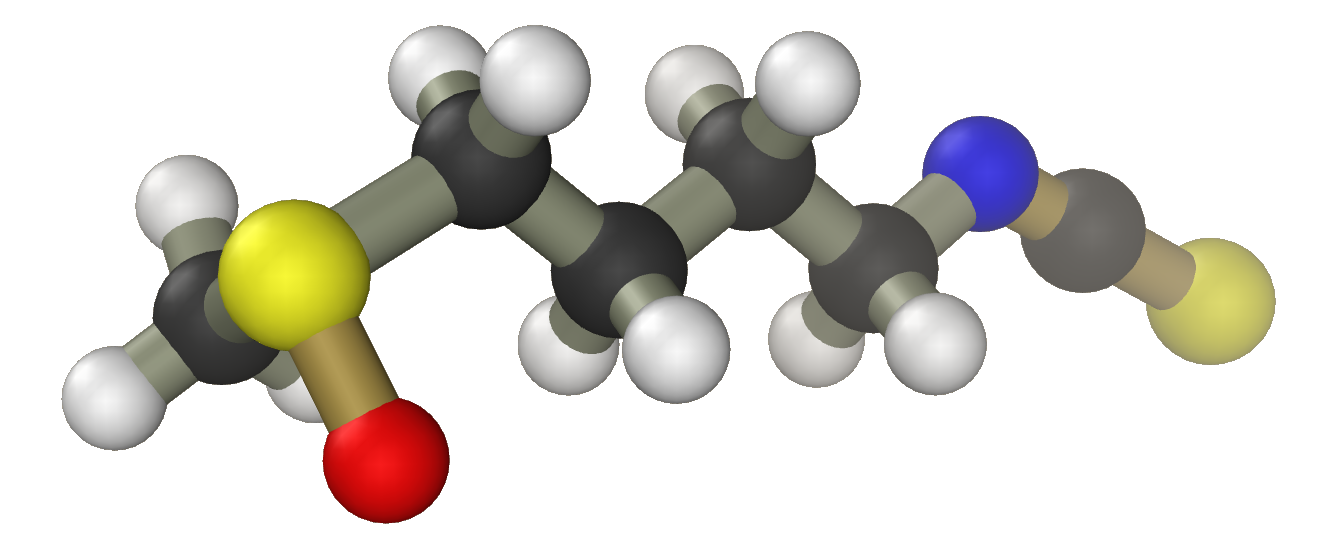

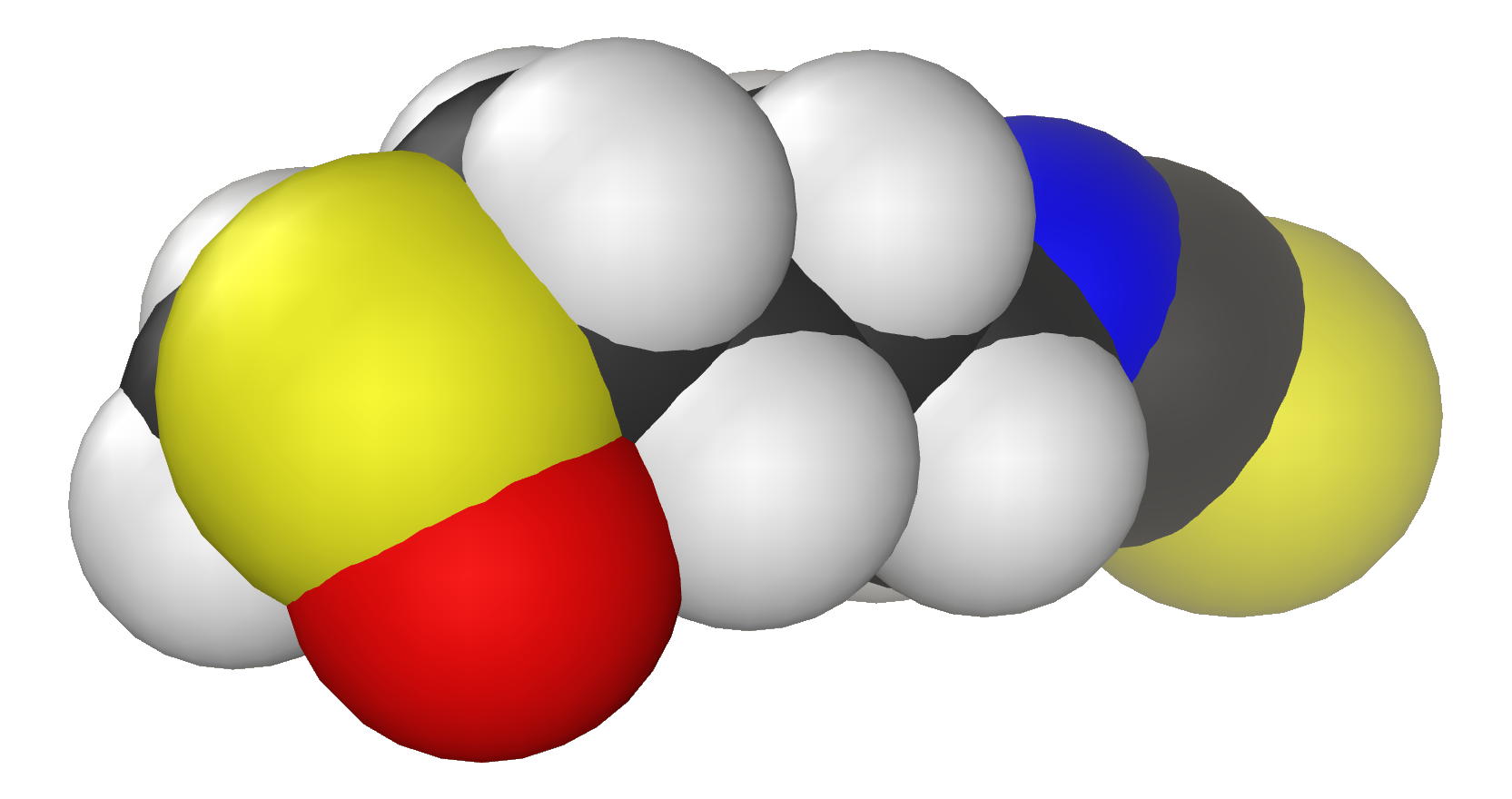

Names
- Preferred IUPAC name 1-Isothiocyanato-4-(methanesulfinyl)butane

Identifiers
CAS Number	4478-93-7
3D model (JSmol)	Interactive image
ChEBI	CHEBI:47807
ChEMBL	ChEMBL48802
ChemSpider	5157
PubChem CID	5350
UNII	41684WL1GL
CompTox Dashboard (EPA)	DTXSID8036732
- InChI: InChI=1S/C6H11NOS2/c1-10(8)5-3-2-4-7-6-9/h2-5H2,1H3 Key: SUVMJBTUFCVSAD-UHFFFAOYSA-N; InChI=1/C6H11NOS2/c1-10(8)5-3-2-4-7-6-9/h2-5H2,1H3 Key: SUVMJBTUFCVSAD-UHFFFAOYAY
- SMILES: CS(=O)CCCCN=C=S

Properties
Chemical formula	C_{6}H_{11}NOS_{2}
Molar mass	177.29 g/mol
- Except where otherwise noted, data are given for materials in their standard state (at 25 °C [77 °F], 100 kPa). verify (what is ?) Infobox references

Sulforaphane (sometimes sulphoraphane in British English) is a phytochemical within the isothiocyanate group of organosulfur compounds. Although sulforaphane research on cancer has been ongoing for many years, there is no good clinical evidence to indicate consuming sulforaphane-rich vegetables or dietary supplements provides any effect.

== Biosynthesis ==
It is produced when the enzyme myrosinase transforms glucoraphanin, a glucosinolate, into sulforaphane upon damage to the plant (such as from chewing or chopping during food preparation), which allows the two compounds to mix and react.

Sulforaphane is present in cruciferous vegetables, such as broccoli, Brussels sprouts, and cabbage. Sulforaphane has two possible stereoisomers due to the presence of a stereogenic sulfur atom.

== Occurrence and isolation ==
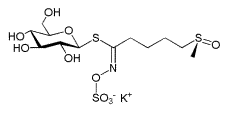
Glucoraphanin, the glucosinolate precursor to sulforaphane

Sulforaphane occurs in broccoli sprouts, which, among cruciferous vegetables, have the highest concentration of glucoraphanin, the precursor to sulforaphane. It is also found in cabbage, cauliflower, Brussels sprouts, bok choy, kale, collards, mustard greens, and watercress.

Under conditions where broccoli is cooked, sulforaphane converts to the thiourea ((CH_{3}SO(CH_{2})_{4}NH)_{2}CS) as well as some 1,2,4-trithiolane.

== Research ==
Although substantial animal research on the possible anti-cancer effects of sulforaphane has been reported, there is no substantial clinical research to indicate consuming foods rich in sulforaphane provides any benefit against cancer.

== See also ==
- Raphanin
