= Glucoraphanin =

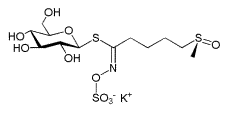
- Potassium salt of glucoraphanin

Names
- IUPAC name 1-S-[(1E)-5-(methylsulfinyl)-N-(sulfonatooxy)pentanimidoyl]-1-thio-β-D-glucopyranose
- Other names Glucorafanin; 4-Methylsulfinylbutyl glucosinolate, Sulforaphane glucosinolate

Identifiers
CAS Number	21414-41-5
3D model (JSmol)	Interactive image
ChEBI	CHEBI:79311
ChemSpider	570930
PubChem CID	656556
UNII	Q86A197713
CompTox Dashboard (EPA)	DTXSID90894071
- InChI: InChI=1S/C12H23NO10S3/c1-25(18)5-3-2-4-8(13-23-26(19,20)21)24-12-11(17)10(16)9(15)7(6-14)22-12/h7,9-12,14-17H,2-6H2,1H3,(H,19,20,21)/p-1/t7-,9-,10+,11-,12+,25?/m1/s1 Key: GMMLNKINDDUDCF-SISVVIKZSA-M; InChI=1/C12H23NO10S3/c1-25(18)5-3-2-4-8(13-23-26(19,20)21)24-12-11(17)10(16)9(15)7(6-14)22-12/h7,9-12,14-17H,2-6H2,1H3,(H,19,20,21)/p-1/t7-,9-,10+,11-,12+,25?/m1/s1 Key: GMMLNKINDDUDCF-XQSZSTCOBC
- SMILES: [O-]S(=O)(=O)ON=C(S[C@@H]1O[C@@H]([C@@H](O)[C@H](O)[C@H]1O)CO)CCCCS(=O)C

Properties
Chemical formula	C_{12}H_{23}NO_{10}S_{3}
Molar mass	437.49 g·mol^{−1}
- Except where otherwise noted, data are given for materials in their standard state (at 25 °C [77 °F], 100 kPa). Infobox references

Glucoraphanin is a glucosinolate found in broccoli, mustard and other cruciferous vegetables.

Glucoraphanin is converted to sulforaphane by the enzyme myrosinase. In plants, sulforaphane deters insect predators and acts as a selective antibiotic.

== Synthesis ==
Glucoraphanin is derived from dihomomethionine, which is methionine chain-elongated twice. The sulfinyl group is chiral, and has R absolute configuration. The stereochemistry is set when an oxygen atom added to 4-methylthiobutylglucosinolate by a flavin monooxygenase.

== Research ==
Sulforaphane and other isothiocyanates have been studied for their potential biological effects. The isothiocyanates formed from glucosinolates are under laboratory research to assess the expression and activation of enzymes that metabolize xenobiotics, such as carcinogens. Observational studies have been conducted to determine if consumption of cruciferous vegetables affects cancer risk in humans, but there is insufficient clinical evidence to indicate that consuming glucoraphanin and other isothiocyanates in cruciferous vegetables is beneficial, according to a 2017 review.

== Plant breeding ==
Cultivars of broccoli have been bred to contain two to three times more glucoraphanin than standard broccoli. Romanesco broccoli may contain up to ten times more glucoraphanin than typical broccoli varieties. Frostara, Black Tuscany, and red cabbage also contain higher levels of glucoraphanin than broccoli.
