= Hitorie discography =

Discography of rock band Hitorie

- Hitorie performing live at Berryten Live 2016.
- Studio albums: 7
- EPs: 4
- Live albums: 3
- Compilation albums: 2
- Singles: 16
- Music videos: 33

The discography of Japanese rock band Hitorie consists of one indie mini-album, one indie EP, seven albums, three mini-albums, one greatest hits album, one reissue album, two live albums and one live movie, seven CD singles, seven digital singles, and two collaboration singles, as of December 2025.

The band was formed in 2011 with lead vocalist/guitarist wowaka, drummer Yumao (ゆーまお), and bassist ygarshy (イガラシ) as hitori-atelier. Guitarist Shinoda (シノダ) joined in 2012 and the band renamed itself to Hitorie. They made their major debut under their own label, Hinichijou Records (非日常レコーズ; lit. 'extraordinary records'), under the Sony Music umbrella in 2014, with their single Senseless Wonder, which peaked at number sixty on the Billboard Japan Hot 100 and was selected for FM802's heavy rotation. Their songs, "on the front line", "3 min 29 sec (3分29秒, 3-pun 29-byou)", and "One Me Two Hearts" were featured on the popular anime series Mushoku Tensei, 86 and Divine Gate, respectively and peaked on the Oricon and Billboard Japan Hot 100 charts.

In 2024, they collaborated for the first time, with vocaloid producer Balloon (also known as Keina Suda), on the song "Wolf". In 2025, they released their seventh studio album, Friend Chord, collaborated with Nijisanji Vtuber Ryushen on the song "Sleep Sheep Syndrome", and wrote and performed "Beauty For" for the band Morfonica, from the multi-media idol series Bang Dream.

== Discography ==
=== Indie releases ===
==== Indie mini-albums ====
Title	Album details	Peak chart positions
Title	Album details	JPN
Roomsick Girls Escape	Released: 31 December 2012; Label: Hinichijou Records (self-published); Formats: CD only	—

==== Indie EPs ====
Title	Album details	Peak chart positions	Sales
Title	Album details	JPN	Sales
non-fiction four e.p.	Released: 29 April 2013; Label: Hinichijou Records (self-published); Formats: CD only	—	JPN: 10.000+

=== Major releases ===
==== Studio albums ====
Title	Album details	Peak chart positions	Sales
Title	Album details	JPN	Sales
Wonder and Wonder	Released: 26 November 2014; Label: Hinichijou Records, Sony Music Associated Records; Formats: CD, digital download, streaming	29	—
Deeper	Released: 24 February 2016; Label: Hinichijou Records, Sony Music Associated Records; Formats: CD, digital download, streaming	26	—
Iki	Released: 7 December 2016; Label: Hinichijou Records, Sony Music Associated Records; Formats: CD, digital download, streaming	27	—
Howls	Released: 27 February 2019; Label: Hinichijou Records, Sony Music Associated Records; Formats: CD, digital download, streaming	26	—
Reamp	Released: 17 February 2021; Label: Hinichijou Records, Sony Music Associated Records; Formats: CD, digital download, streaming	18	JPN: 2.418
Pharmacy	Released: 22 June 2022; Label: Hinichijou Records, Sony Music Associated Records; Formats: CD, digital download, streaming	35	JPN: 1.434
Friend Chord	Released: 22 January 2025; Label: Hinichijou Records, Sony Music Associated Records; Formats: CD, digital download, streaming	19	JPN: 2.298

==== Mini-albums ====
Title	Album details	Peak chart positions	Sales
Title	Album details	JPN	Sales
Imaginary Mono-Fiction (イマジナリー・モノフィクション)	Released: 19 February 2014; Label: Hinichijou Records, Sony Music Associated Records; Formats: CD, digital download, streaming	18	—
Mono-chrono Entrance (モノクロノ・エントランス)	Released: 1 July 2015; Label: Hinichijou Records, Sony Music Associated Records; Formats: CD, digital download, streaming	26	—
Aisolate	Released: 6 December 2017; Label: Hinichijou Records, Sony Music Associated Records; Formats: CD, digital download, streaming	31	—

==== Compilation albums ====
Title	Album details	Peak chart positions	Sales
Title	Album details	JPN	Sales
4	Released: 19 August 2020; Label: Hinichijou Records, Sony Music Associated Records; Formats: CD, digital download, streaming	13	JPN: 3.631

==== Reissue albums ====
Title	Album details	Peak chart positions	Sales
Title	Album details	JPN	Sales
Roomsick Girls Escape/non-fiction four e.p.	Released: 4 November 2015; Label: Hinichijou Records, Sony Music Associated Records; Formats: CD, digital download, streaming	29	—

==== Live albums ====
Title	Album details	Peak chart positions	Sales
Title	Album details	JPN	Sales
one-Me Tour “DEEP/SEEK” at Studio Coast	Released: 17 August 2016; Label: Hinichijou Records, Sony Music Associated Records; Formats: CD, DVD, Blu-ray, digital download, streaming	—	—
Hitorie Live Tour Unknown 2018 "Loveless" - 2017 "IKI"	Released: 4 November 2019; Label: Hinichijou Records; Formats: DVD, Blu-ray	—	—
Amplified Tour 2021 at Osaka	Released: 19 January 2022; Label: Hinichijou Records, Sony Music Associated Records; Formats: CD, DVD, Blu-Ray, digital download, streaming (Note: Released as "Selected Edition")	33	—

==== Singles ====
===== CD singles =====
Title	Year	Peak chart positions		Album
Title	Year	JPN	JPN Hot	Album
Senseless Wonder	2014	26	60	Wonder and Wonder
Shutter Doll (シャッタードール)	2015	34	—	Deeper
One Me Two Hearts (ワンミーツハー)	2016	34	70	Deeper
Polaris (ポラリス)	2018	49	—	Howls
3-min 29-sec (3分29秒, 3-pun 29-byou)	2021	22	—	Pharmacy
on the front line / Sense-less Wonder [ReREC] (オン・ザ・フロントライン / センスレス・ワンダー[ReREC])	2024	28	—	Friend Chord, Non-album single
Notok	2024	13	—	Friend Chord (Note: Released on Friend Chord as "Notok (Album version)", with Shinoda as the vocalist.)
"—" denotes a recording that did not chart.

===== Digital singles =====
Title	Year	Album
Unknown Mother-Goose	2017	Aisolate
curved edge	2020	Reamp
Stereo Juvenile (ステレオジュブナイル)	2022	Pharmacy
Juggernaut (ジャガーノート)	2023	Friend Chord
Sense-less Wonder after 10 years (10年後のセンスレス・ワンダー)	2024	Non-album single
on the front line (オン・ザ・フロントライン)	2024	Friend Chord
Minikui Katachi (みにくいかたち, 'Ugly shapes')	2025	Non-album single

===== Collaboration singles =====
Title	Year	Peak chart positions		Album
Title	Year	JPN	JPN Hot	Album
Wolf (with Balloon)	2024	—	—	Fall Apart
sleep sheep syndrome (with Ryushen)	2025	—	—	Non-album single
"—" denotes a recording that did not chart.

===== Other singles =====
- "Plamo" (2026; Produced and arranged by Hitorie, performed and released by Otoha.)
- "Shururerira" (しゅるれりら) (2026; Produced and arranged by Hitorie, performed and released by Otoha.)
