= 4 (Hitorie compilation) =

Compilation album by hitorie
- Released: August 19, 2020 (postponed from April 22, 2020)
- Recorded: 2012–2019
- Genre: J-pop
- Label: Sony Music Associated Records

Hitorie chronology
HOWLS (2019)	4 (2020)	REAMP (2021)

Singles from 4
- 1. "hitorie demo (#2)" Released: October 28, 2012; 2. "non-fiction four e.p. (#2)" Released: April 28, 2013; 3. "Senseless Wonder" Released: January 22, 2014; 4. "Shutterdoll" Released: November 4, 2015; 5. "One Meets Her" Released: January 27, 2016; 6. "Unknown Mother-Goose" Released: October 22, 2017; 7. "Polaris" Released: November 28, 2018

4 (Four) is the first compilation album by the Japanese rock band hitorie. It was released on August 19, 2020, by Sony Music Associated Records, having been originally scheduled for April 22, 2020.

== Background and release ==
It is the band's first compilation album and their first release in approximately one year since HOWLS (2019).

The album features songs selected by the band members themselves as the best tracks from their time as a four-piece group. (Note: Vocalist, lyricist, and composer wowaka died of acute heart failure at the age of 31 on April 5, 2019, leaving the band as a trio.) The title 4 was chosen because it is a compilation album created by the four members. The title was conceived by guitarist Shinoda.

The album was originally scheduled for release on April 22, 2020. However, due to the spread of the COVID-19 pandemic and the subsequent declaration of a state of emergency by the Japanese government, CD shops nationwide were forced to close, making physical sales impossible and leading to a sudden postponement of the release. On May 8, 2020, it was announced that the album would be released on August 19, 2020.

== Track listing ==
Disc 1
No.	Title	Length
1.	"Kara no Waremono"	5:10
2.	"SisterJudy"	2:16
3.	"Montage Girl"	3:28
4.	"Inaikara"	5:25
5.	"Senseless Wonder"	4:17
6.	"Antithesis Junk Girl"	4:00
7.	"Odoru Manekin, Utau Aho"	4:30
8.	"(W)HERE"	6:09
9.	"Imperfection"	3:12
10.	"NONSENSE"	4:07
11.	"Talkie Dance"	4:22
12.	"Shutterdoll"	3:36
13.	"One Meets Her"	3:25
14.	"Fuyuno"	5:33

Disc 2
No.	Title	Length
1.	"Little Cry Baby"	4:51
2.	"Eve Stepper"	3:44
3.	"doppel"	4:51
4.	"Memai"	4:28
5.	"Unknown Mother Goose (Note: A self-cover of a song originally produced by wowaka for Vocaloid.)"	4:41
6.	"Zettaiteki"	2:27
7.	"Loveless"	4:52
8.	"Polaris"	4:23
9.	"Nichijou to Chikyuu no Gakubuchi"	3:46
10.	"Coyote in Ghost"	4:38
11.	"SLEEPWALK"	4:06
12.	"Ao"	5:35
13.	"Rolling Girl 2016.2.18 at Shimokitazawa GARDEN"	4:12

First press limited edition Blu-ray COUNTDOWN JAPAN 18/19 (December 31, 2018)
No.	Title	Length
1.	"Odoru Manekin, Utau Aho"
2.	"Talkie Dance"
3.	"Unknown Mother Goose"
4.	"Polaris"
5.	"Senseless Wonder"

== Personnel ==
- wowaka – vocals, guitar, lyrics, composition
- Shinoda – guitar, backing vocals
- Yumao – drums, backing vocals
- Igarashi – bass, backing vocals
