= 86 (TV series) =

Japanese anime television series

- Created by: Asato Asato; Shirabii
- Written by: Toshiya Ōno
- Directed by: Toshimasa Ishii
- Starring: Shōya Chiba; Ikumi Hasegawa; Seiichiro Yamashita; Natsumi Fujiwara; Saori Hayami; Sayumi Suzushiro
- Theme music composer: Hiroyuki Sawano; Kohta Yamamoto
- Opening theme: "3-pun 29-byō" by Hitorie (eps. 1–11); "Kyōkaisen" by Amazarashi (eps. 12–23)
- Ending theme: "Avid" by SawanoHiroyuki[nZk]:mizuki (eps. 1–6); "Hands Up to the Sky" by SawanoHiroyuki[nZk]:Laco (eps. 7–11); "Alchemilla" by Regal Lily (eps. 12–17); "LilaS" by SawanoHiroyuki[nZk]:Honoka Takahashi (eps. 18–23)
- Composers: Hiroyuki Sawano; Kohta Yamamoto
- Country of origin: Japan
- Original language: Japanese
- No. of seasons: 1
- No. of episodes: 23 (list of episodes)

Production
- Executive producers: Nobuhiro Nakayama; Mayu Miyako; Takao Kiyose
- Running time: 24 minutes
- Production company: A-1 Pictures

Original release
- Network: Tokyo MX; BS11; GYT; GTV; ytv; CTV
- Release: April 11, 2021 – March 19, 2022

Related
- 86 (light novel)

86 (stylized as 86 EIGHTY-SIX; 86 -エイティシックス- (Eiti Shikkusu)) is a Japanese anime television series based on the light novel series written by Asato Asato and illustrated by Shirabii. Produced by A-1 Pictures and directed by Toshimasa Ishii, the series aired in two split cours from April 11, 2021, to March 19, 2022. It was licensed for streaming outside of Asia by Crunchyroll, and by Muse Communication in Southeast Asia.

== Plot ==
The Republic of San Magnolia has been at war with the neighboring Empire of Giad for nine years. While the Republic's government claims the war is being fought by autonomous, unmanned drones called Juggernauts, this is a lie. The Juggernauts are actually piloted by humans: the "86", a derogatory designation for the Colorata minority who have been stripped of their rights, forced into internment camps, and coerced into fighting on the front lines.

Major Vladilena "Lena" Milizé, an Alba (the dominant racial group) noble and military officer, is assigned as a "Handler" to remotely command the Spearhead Squadron, an elite unit of 86 veterans. Unlike other Handlers who view the 86 as disposable, Lena treats them with humanity and respect. The squadron is led by the 16-year-old Shinei "Shin" Nouzen, callsign "Undertaker", who is infamous among military officials because previous Handlers have reportedly gone insane or committed suicide after communicating with his unit. As Lena works to uncover the truth behind the Republic's deception and the true nature of the enemy Legion, she and the Spearhead Squadron form a profound bond that transcends the battlefield.

== Characters ==
- Shinei "Shin" Nouzen (シンエイ・ノウゼン, Shin'ei Nōzen) Voiced by: Shōya Chiba (Japanese); Billy Kametz (eps. 1–21), Aleks Le (eps. 22–23) (English): The 16-year-old leader of the Spearhead Squadron. Nicknamed "Undertaker" or "The Reaper", he carries a box of makeshift dog tags made from the remains of his fallen comrades, vowing to bury them when the war ends.
- Vladilena "Lena" Milizé (ヴラディレーナ・ミリーゼ, Vuradirēna Mirīze) Voiced by: Ikumi Hasegawa (Japanese); Suzie Yeung (English): A 16-year-old prodigy promoted to Major in the San Magnolian military. She is assigned as the Handler of the Spearhead Squadron and becomes a fierce advocate for the 86.
- Raiden "Wehrwolf" Shuga (ライデン・シュガ, Raiden Shuga) Voiced by: Seiichiro Yamashita (Japanese); Jonah Scott (English): The vice-captain and executive officer of the Spearhead Squadron, and Shin's closest friend.
- Theoto "Laughing Fox" Rikka (セオト・リッカ, Seoto Rikka) Voiced by: Natsumi Fujiwara (Japanese); Casey Mongillo (English): A blunt and sarcastic member of the squadron who initially distrusts Lena but comes to respect her.
- Anju "Snow Witch" Emma (アンジュ・エマ, Anju Ema) Voiced by: Saori Hayami (Japanese); Maureen Price (English): A soft-spoken, kind-hearted mixed-race member of the squadron who hides scars on her back caused by abuse from both Albas and 86.
- Kurena "Gunslinger" Kukumila (クレナ・ククミラ, Kurena Kukumira) Voiced by: Sayumi Suzushiro (Japanese); Erica Mendez (English): The squadron's sniper. She harbors intense hatred for the Albas due to the murder of her family, but gradually learns to trust Lena.

== Production ==
The anime adaptation was announced during a livestream commemorating the first anniversary of Kadokawa's "Kimirano" light novel website on March 15, 2020. The series is produced by A-1 Pictures and directed by Toshimasa Ishii, with Toshiya Ōno handling series composition, Tetsuya Kawakami designing the characters, and Hiroyuki Sawano and Kohta Yamamoto composing the music. CGI production was handled by Shirogumi.

The series was originally scheduled to premiere in 2020, but it was indefinitely delayed. It was later confirmed to be a split-cour anime. A special pre-broadcast program aired on March 28, 2021, featuring the main cast, producer Nobuhiro Nakayama, and composer Hiroyuki Sawano.

== Broadcast and release ==
The first half of the series (episodes 1–11) aired on Tokyo MX, BS11, GYT, GTV, ytv, and CTV from April 11 to June 20, 2021. (Note: The series premiered on April 10, 2021, at 24:00 (effectively, April 11 at 12:00 a.m. JST).) The second half (episodes 12–23) aired from October 3, 2021, to March 19, 2022.

Crunchyroll streamed the series worldwide outside of Asia, including an English dub. Muse Communication licensed the series for distribution in Southeast Asia.

== Music ==
The musical score was composed by Hiroyuki Sawano and Kohta Yamamoto. The series features multiple theme songs corresponding to its split-cour broadcast:

- The first opening theme is "3-pun 29-byō" (3分29秒, lit. '3 Minutes 29 Seconds') by Hitorie.
- The first ending theme is "Avid" by SawanoHiroyuki[nZk]:mizuki (episodes 1–6).
- The second ending theme is "Hands Up to the Sky" by SawanoHiroyuki[nZk]:Laco (episodes 7–11).
- The second opening theme is "Kyōkaisen" (境界線, lit. 'Boundary Line') by Amazarashi.
- The third ending theme is "Alchemilla" (ルケミラ, Arukemira) by Regal Lily (episodes 12–17).
- The fourth ending theme is "LilaS" by SawanoHiroyuki[nZk]:Honoka Takahashi (episodes 18–23).

== Reception ==
IGN listed 86 as one of the best anime of 2021. Multiple writers from Anime News Network listed the anime's first season as one of their favorite series from spring 2021, with Steve Jones also naming the second season as his most anticipated for fall 2021.

The Fandom Post gave the show an A−, noting that although the first episode felt stiff and full of "technobabble", the show found its footing by episode two. At the close of season one, the site praised the show's stellar production value, solid animation and music, and beautiful conveyance of its themes. Callum May's review for Anime News Network also noted the series' improvement by episode two, describing the first few episodes as "surprisingly gripping", and offered specific praise for the show's directing, storyboarding, and animation.

The anime entry in The Encyclopedia of Science Fiction calls it "a very good example of thoughtful and action-packed Military SF, with the bleak first season being the stand-out".

The series was nominated at the 6th Crunchyroll Anime Awards in five categories: Anime of the Year, Best Girl (Vladilena Milizé), Best Drama, Best Score (Hiroyuki Sawano and Kohta Yamamoto), and Best Voice Artist Performance – Portuguese (Hannah Buttel as Vladilena Milizé). It was again nominated for Best Drama, while Geneviève Doang's performance as Vladilena Milizé was nominated for Best Voice Artist Performance (French) at the 7th Crunchyroll Anime Awards.
