= Howls (Hitorie album) =

- Standard edition cover.

Studio album by Hitorie
- Released: February 27, 2019
- Recorded: July - October 2018
- Genre: Rock, J-pop, alternative rock
- Length: 40:50
- Language: Japanese
- Label: Hinichijou Records, Sony Music Associated Records

Hitorie chronology
| ai/SOlate (2017) | Howls (2019) | 4 (2020) |

Alternative cover
- Limited edition cover art

Singles from Howls
- 1. "Polaris" Released: November 28, 2018

Howls (stylized in all caps) is the fourth studio album by Japanese rock band Hitorie. It was released on February 27, 2019, and is the last album to feature band frontman wowaka as the lead singer and songwriter, due to his death two months after the album's release on April 5.

The album features "Polaris" as the lead single, which was used as the eighth ending theme for the anime series Boruto: Naruto Next Generations. The song charted at 49 on the Oricon Combined Singles chart, and the album itself charted at 28 on the Combined Albums chart.

== Background and development ==
Howls was produced after the band returned from their 2018 tour Loveless. The band first worked on "Polaris", which released in November of that year, while production on the rest of the songs happened between July and October. Certain songs, such as "Sleepwalk", "Sappukei" and "Windmill" had part of their lyrics already written before full production on the album began.

The album marked a turning point for songwriter wowaka, who while writing the lyrics for Iki, felt like he was understanding the meaning of "being human", felt instead that songs in Howls were the result of his battle with frustration and loneliness, as well as his experiences in a solo trip to India. It also marked a turning point in the band's musical style, opting for a heavier style with loud, distorted guitars and an 8-beat time signature (on "Coyote and Ghost"), while still featuring the band's introspective lyrics. The exception to this being the song "Sleepwalk", which takes a more pop-style sound, and was produced solely by wowaka himself, originally not planning to release it at all. The song was inspired by wowaka's love for international pop music.

Band guitarist Shinoda co-composed the track "Idol Junkfeed" alongside wowaka. While production on the rest of the album's songs was in a slump, Shinoda decided to compose a song himself, later showing it to wowaka who worked on the track together.

== Promotion and release ==
Howls was announced on January 11, 2019. Alongside the album's release, the band announced two tours: a fifth anniversary tour, Hitori-Escape 2019 'Super Extraordinary Shimokitazawa Seven Days Edition' (超非日常下北沢七日間篇), a seven-day live event held at Shimokitazawa on the 21st of that month to the 27th, which featured album signing events and solo performances by band members; and their Coyote Howling tour to support the album, the latter starting on the 1st of March in Osaka, and planned to end on the 1st of June in Tokyo.

Halfway through the tour, the band announced the cancellation of their Kyoto and Okayama performances, scheduled to be held on April 6th and 7th, respectively, due to "undisclosed circumstances" involving the band members. On the 8th, it was announced that wowaka had passed away at the age of 31 of acute heart failure three days earlier, on the 5th. All other performances were cancelled and tickets were refunded, and the band announced they would be entering an indefinite hiatus.

== Track listing ==
All tracks are written by wowaka.

| No. | Title | Notes | Length |
|---|---|---|---|
| 1. | "Polaris (ポラリス, Porarisu)" | | 4:21 |
| 2. | "Garandou Mae Zero Banchi (伽蓝如何前零番地, lit. 'Empty Prayer Before Residency Zero')" | | 3:44 |
| 3. | "Coyote and Ghost (コヨーテエンゴースト, Koyōte-en-gōsuto)" | | 4:35 |
| 4. | "Sleepwalk" | | 4:04 |
| 5. | "Sappukei (殺風景, lit. 'Desolate')" | | 1:42 |
| 6. | "November" | | 4:58 |
| 7. | "Lack" | | 3:55 |
| 8. | "Idol Junkfeed" | Co-composed with Shinoda | 3:22 |
| 9. | "Ao (青, Blue)" | | 5:31 |
| 10. | "Windmill (ウィンドミル, Uindomiru)" | | 4:18 |
| Total length: | | | 40:50 |

== Personnel ==
Obtained from the Howls inner notes booklet.

=== Music ===
==== Hitorie ====
- All members – arrangement
- wowaka – production, vocals, rhythm guitar
- Shinoda (シノダ) – lead guitar, backing vocals
- ygarshy (イガラシ) – bass guitar
- Yumao (ゆーまお) – drums

==== Staff ====
- Shinjiro "Megane" Hirai – recording, mixing (Freedom Studio Infinity, Studio Greenbird, Sounduno, Studio Megane)
- Kiyoshi Tsujimoto – recording assistant (Freedom Studio Infinity)
- Hiroshi Manabe – recording assistant (Studio Greenbird)
- Stuart Hawkes – mastering (Metropolis Studios)
- Atsuro Takada – drums engineer
- Shuichi Takano – A&R director (Hinichijou Records, Sony Music Associated Records)
- Terumasa Yabushita – A&R producer (Hinichijou Records, Sony Music Associated Records)

==== Visuals ====
- Tetsuya Nagato – art direction and design
- Katsuhide Morimoto – photography
- Kentaro Higaki – styling
- Risa Fukushima – hair and make-up
- odori – logo
- Yuko Mori – product coordination (Sony Music)

==== Miscellaneous ====
- Toshio Kugai – label assistant (Sony Music Associated Records)
- Momoko Takada – artist management (Snow White Music Inc.)
- Megumi Katsumura – artist management (assistant) [Snow White Music Inc.]
- Motomu Goto – general producer (Hinichijou Records, Sony Music Associated Records)
- Hidehiko Otani – executive producer (Hinichijou Records, Sony Music Associated Records)
- Mika Arata – executive producer (Snow White Music Inc.)

== Charts ==
Chart performance for Howls
| Chart (2019) | Peak position |
|---|---|
| Japanese Albums (Oricon) | 28 |
| Japanese Hot Albums (Billboard Japan) | 37 |
| Japanese Top Albums Sales (Billboard Japan) | 24 |
