= Roomsick Girls Escape/Non-Fiction Four =

Studio album by Hitorie
- Released: November 4, 2015
- Length: 46:34
- Label: Hijitsujitsu Records

Roomsick Girls Escape/Non-Fiction Four (Japanese: ルームシック・ガールズエスケープ／non-fiction four e.p., Hepburn: Rūmushikku Gāruzu Esukēpu / non-fiction four e.p.) is a reissue album by the Japanese rock band Hitorie. It was released on November 4, 2015, through the band's independent label Hijitsujitsu Records (非日常レコーズ), distributed by Sony Music Labels.

== Background and release ==
The album compiles two of Hitorie's early, out-of-print independent releases: the mini-album Roomsick Girls Escape and the Non-Fiction Four EP. The audio for all tracks was fully remastered for this reissue. The physical release features newly drawn jacket artwork by the painter Kyotaro.

In addition to the remastered original tracks, the album includes a bonus track titled "Kara no Waremono [ReREC]", which is a newly re-recorded version of "Kara no Waremono", originally featured as the sixth track on the compilation.

To promote the release, Hitorie held their independent two-man live event "bAnd" vol.2 on November 26, 2015, at Shimokitazawa Garden, where they co-headlined with the band Mo'some Tonebender.

== Track listing ==
All tracks are written by wowaka.

No.	Title	Length
1.	"SisterJudy"	2:14
2.	"モンタージュガール (Montage Girl)"	3:29
3.	"アレとコレと、女の子 (Aretokoreto, Onnanoko)"	3:43
4.	"るらるら (Lulalula)"	3:19
5.	"サブリミナル・ワンステップ (Subliminal Onestep)"	3:43
6.	"カラノワレモノ (Kara No Waremono)"	5:11
7.	"泡色の街 (Awaironomachi)"	6:15
8.	"らんらんと泣いて (Ran Ran To Naite)"	3:25
9.	"Inaikara"	5:22
10.	"ハネルマワル (Haneru Mawaru)"	4:26
11.	"カラノワレモノ[ReREC] (Kara No Waremono [ReREC])"	5:07

== Music video ==
On November 12, 2015, a music video for the bonus track "Kara no Waremono [ReREC]" was released on YouTube. The video was directed by Hidenobu Tanabe, marking his first time directing a music video for Hitorie. The visual concept features a colorful aesthetic with the band members peeking through gaps in brightly colored walls. Music media noted this as a deliberate contrast to the music video for the single "Shutter Doll", which was released on the same day and featured a strictly monochrome visual style.
