= Wonder and Wonder =

Studio album CD, CD+DVD, digital download by Hitorie
- Released: November 26, 2014
- Recorded: 2014
- Genre: Rock, alternative rock, J-pop
- Label: Hinichijou Records, Sony Music Associated Records

Hitorie chronology
Imaginary Monofiction (2014)	Wonder and Wonder (2014)	Monocolor (2015)

Wonder and Wonder (stylized as WONDER and WONDER) is the first full-length studio album by Japanese rock band Hitorie. It was released on November 26, 2014, through their independent label, Hinichijou Records, under Sony Music Associated Records. The album features 12 tracks, including the lead single "Imperfection" and the band's major debut single "Senseless Wonder".

== Background ==
Following their major debut in early 2014, Hitorie experienced an intense period of live performances. The announcement of the album was made on October 9, 2014, during the final show of their "Ofutarisama de Hyoryu Tour" in Aichi.

The production was marked by a significant creative crisis for frontman wowaka. Initially intending to create a meticulously organized conceptual work, wowaka faced severe writer's block after his experiences on tour, feeling unable to produce any material he found satisfactory. This led to a shift in the band's dynamic; instead of wowaka providing completed demos, the four members met in the studio daily to compose together from scratch. Bassist ygarshy described the process as the band members using their skills to "launch" wowaka out of his slump. The members jokingly compared the high-pressure environment to "Siberia," noting that such harsh conditions were necessary to produce "aurora-like" results.

== Style and composition ==
Wonder and Wonder represents a stylistic turning point where wowaka moved away from the digital production of his Vocaloid career in favor of "music with a visible face" (顔が見える音楽, kao ga mieru ongaku), emphasizing the physical performance of a live band. For the tracks "NONSENSE" and "Boatman," wowaka was initially influenced by MOSAIC.WAV and Denpagumi.inc. He also moved away from using a fictional "girl" character as a lyrical filter in favor of a more direct personal style.

The album addresses the contemporary trend of "fast-BPM" and "four-on-the-floor" dance rock in the Japanese music scene. While wowaka acknowledged his role (alongside artists like Hachi) as a pioneer of this style, the band sought to subvert these tropes. ygarshy stated that they aimed to "deceive" the audience's expectations, such as using an 8-beat rhythm in "Imperfection" that mimics a dance beat, or placing an even kick drum in the 5/4 time signature of "5 Count Hello." Drummer Yumao emphasized that they wanted to provide "depth" to their sound to avoid the shallowness of simply playing fast.

== Recording and packaging ==
Art director Tetsuya Nagato handled the album's visual identity, creating a collage-style cover art. The promotional photography, featuring the members in front of a pile of waste, was directed by Nagato to reflect the album's worldview.

The album was released in two editions:

- Regular Edition (CD only): AICL-2787.
- Limited Edition (CD+DVD): AICL-2785–6. The DVD features live footage from the "Mannequin in the Park" tour finale at LIQUIDROOM on April 18, 2014. It includes the first official physical release of band covers for wowaka's Vocaloid hits, "World's End Dancehall" and "Rolling Girl."

== Release and promotion ==
On October 24, 2014, a music video for "Imperfection" was released, directed by Daisuke Shimada. On November 8, the band released a digest video on YouTube, previewing all 12 tracks and clips from the limited edition DVD.

Hitorie supported the release with their first nationwide solo tour, "WONDER and WANDER", consisting of 12 dates from December 2014 to January 17, 2015.

== Track listing ==
All tracks are written by wowaka.

No.	Title	Length
1.	"Shuchakuten" (終着点)	3:12
2.	"Imperfection" (インパーフェクション)	3:11
3.	"N/A"	4:27
4.	"5 Count Hello" (5カウントハロー)	3:12
5.	"Pupa Cinema" (ピューパ・シネマ)	4:25
6.	"Kuse" (癖)	3:43
7.	"NONSENSE"	4:05
8.	"Boatman" (ボートマン)	4:18
9.	"Nazenaze" (なぜなぜ)	3:44
10.	"Garakuta Asobi" (我楽多遊び)	2:57
11.	"Ghost Roll" (ゴーストロール)	3:57
12.	"Senseless Wonder" (センスレス・ワンダー)	4:15

== Personnel ==
- wowaka – vocals, guitar
- Shinoda (シノダ) – guitar, backing vocals
- ygarshy (イガラシ) – bass
- Yumao (ゆーまお) – drums
