= Roomsick Girls Escape =

2012 mini-album by hitorie

EP by hitorie
- Released: December 31, 2012

Roomsick Girls Escape (ルームシック・ガールズエスケープ) is the debut mini-album by the Japanese rock band hitorie, independently released on December 31, 2012, at Comiket 83. It marked the band's first official release and introduced their musical style.

== Production and release ==
Produced by wowaka, the band's vocalist and guitarist, Roomsick Girls Escape was created by a small team of seven people. Wowaka described the album as a personal project intended to convey emotional and thematic depth. Initially, the mini-album was sold exclusively at Comiket 83 in West Hall booth 18b for ¥1,000. Due to its limited physical run, the album became difficult to obtain, prompting the band to release it for digital download on platforms such as the iTunes Store and Recochoku on December 18, 2013.

The album consists of seven tracks, including Rula Rula (るらるら), which later became a staple of the band's live performances. A music video for "Rula Rula" was released on YouTube, accompanied by a crossfade video previewing all seven tracks on the mini-album. This crossfade video was later included as bonus content on the DVD bundled with the limited edition of the band's major debut single, Senseless Wonder (センスレス・ワンダー), released on January 22, 2014.

== Reception ==
As an independent release, Roomsick Girls Escape sold approximately 10,000 copies. Its initial availability was restricted to physical sales at events and via mail order, contributing to its rarity prior to the digital release.

The album's music videos, particularly the crossfade video, were noted for their creative presentation. The inclusion of these videos on the Senseless Wonder DVD provided fans with broader access to hitorie's early visual works.

== Track listing ==
All tracks are written by wowaka.

No.	Title	Length
1.	"SisterJudy"	2:14
2.	"Montage Girl (モンタージュガール)"	3:29
3.	"Aretokoreto, Onnanoko (アレとコレと、女の子)"	3:43
4.	"Rula Rula (るらるら)"	3:19
5.	"Subliminal Onestep (サブリミナル・ワンステップ)"	3:43
6.	"Kara No Waremono (カラノワレモノ)"	5:11
7.	"Awaironomachi (泡色の街)"	6:15

== Legacy ==
Following the release of Roomsick Girls Escape, hitorie announced their major debut under the Sony Music Group's newly established label, Hinichijou Records (非日常レコーズ). The release of their major debut single, Senseless Wonder, on January 22, 2014, marked the band's transition to a wider audience.

The album remains a part of hitorie's discography, representing the band's early independent work prior to their major label debut.
