= Hitorie =

Japanese rock band

Hitorie ヒトリエ
- Logo of Hitorie

Background information
- Also known as: hitori atelier (ひとりアトリエ)
- Genres: Indie rock; alternative rock; dance-rock; post-hardcore
- Works: Hitorie discography
- Years active: 2011–present
- Labels: Sony Music Associated Records; Hinichijou Records (非日常レコーズ)
- Members: Shinoda (シノダ); Ygarshy (イガラシ); Yumao (ゆーまお)
- Past members: wowaka
- Website: hitorie.jp

YouTube information
- Channel: @hitorieJP
- Years active: 2013–present
- Genre: Music
- Subscribers: 435 thousand
- Views: 248.1 million

Hitorie (ヒトリエ), sometimes stylized in all caps or lowercase, is a Japanese rock band formed in 2011 by lead vocalist, guitarist and songwriter wowaka along with bassist ygarshy and drummer Yumao under the name hitori atelier (ひとりアトリエ). Backing vocalist and fellow guitarist Shinoda joined in 2012, and the band renamed to its current name the same year.

They made their major debut under Sony Music Japan in 2014 with their single Senseless Wonder, which peaked on the Billboard Hot 100 chart and was selected for FM802's heavy rotation, and released four studio albums: Wonder and Wonder (2014), Deeper and Iki (2016), and Howls (2019), as well as three mini-albums: Imaginary Mono-Fiction (2014), Mono-chrono Entrance (2015), and ai/SOlate (2017).

After a brief hiatus between 2019 and 2020, due to wowaka's passing, the band released the greatest hits album 4 (2020), and returned as a 3-piece with guitarist Shinoda as the lead vocalist. They have since released three albums: Reamp (2021), Pharmacy (2022), and Friend Chord (2025). All their albums have charted on the Oricon Combined Albums Chart.

All of the band's members have also written and performed songs for other artists, such as Sakanamon, QU4RTZ, Suisoh, and Hiroshi Kamiya. As a band, they wrote the songs "Beauty For" and "Hōtā ni Saku" (滂沱に咲く, 'Blooming profusely'), for Morfonica and Soraru, respectively, and collaborated with Balloon (Keina Suda), and Ryushen, from Nijisanji.

== Band members ==
=== Current members ===
Shinoda (シノダ, born June 6, 1985) is the lead vocalist and guitarist of Hitorie. He joined the band in 2012 as the lead guitarist and backing vocalist. Following the death of wowaka in 2019, Shinoda assumed the role of lead vocalist. The transition was initially proposed by bassist ygarshy during a band meeting. Although Shinoda was initially hesitant, he received encouragement from acquaintances and experienced a coincidental streak of good luck, such as winning multiple prize draws, which he interpreted as a sign that he was meant to take on the role. (Note: On the February 20, 2021, broadcast of Room No. 69, it was mentioned, "I won 6 out of 7 tickets," to which Shinoda commented, "I thought more would sound better.") Outside of Hitorie, Shinoda is active as a Vocaloid producer under the pseudonym "Shoudouteki no Hito (衝動的の人)" (Impulsive Person) and runs a solo music project named "cakebox". He was previously the guitarist for the Nagoya-based rock band JONNY. Additionally, he is a visual artist who has illustrated band merchandise and authored a manga series on the web media platform Meetia. He has also arranged and composed music for various artists, including Dialogue+, yutori, Satifour, Suisoh, and Itsuki Natsume. From October 2023 to January 2025, he embarked on a solo acoustic tour across all 47 prefectures of Japan titled "Shinotetsu" (シノ鉄).

ygarshy (イガラシ, born June 17, 1985) plays bass and provides backing vocals. He is known for rarely speaking during live performance MCs, and during wowaka's tenure, he was occasionally seen eating candy on stage while the other members handled lengthy discussions. Outside the band, he works as a support bassist for acts such as Wasureranneyo (忘れらんねえよ), Leo Ieiri, and Reol. He was previously the bassist for the Touhou Project band Sekken'ya (石鹸屋) and the music unit JUDGEMENT, alongside vocalist ichigo of Kishida Cult. He also composed the song "Beautiful Moonlight" and played bass on the debut single of the idol group QU4RTZ, "Sing & Smile!!", from the series Love Live! Nijigasaki High School Idol Club.

Yumao (ゆーまお, born December 6, 1988) is the drummer and backing vocalist. Prior to joining Hitorie, he was active in the band yasashikute (優しくして♪), which disbanded in 2012. He is a highly sought-after session musician, providing drum work for artists such as LiSA, natori, Ado, and Jin (including works from the Kagerou Project). He also serves as a support drummer for the band Pedro, for whom he has occasionally composed music.

=== Previous members ===
wowaka (November 4, 1987 – April 5, 2019) was the band's founder, lead vocalist, rhythm guitarist, and primary songwriter from 2011 until his death.

Before forming Hitorie, wowaka was a highly influential Vocaloid producer under the alias "Escapism-P (現実逃避P, Genjitsu-Tōhi-P)", a name originating from the description of his first video on NicoVideo, "In the Grey Zone" (グレーゾーンにて。). He rapidly gained popularity in the online music community following the release of viral hits such as "Rolling Girl" and "World's End Dancehall". In 2011, he released his debut Vocaloid album, Unhappy Refrain, under Balloom, a record label he co-founded, to widespread critical acclaim. Later that same year, he announced his departure from the Vocaloid scene to focus entirely on Hitorie.

As a songwriter, wowaka penned tracks for various prominent artists. He wrote and composed "Hitori Waratte", "Kakuseiya", and "Egoistic Shooter" for LiSA, and composed "antinotice" for the major-label debut of illustrator and singer Akane Aki. In the anime industry, he wrote the lyrics and music for "And I'm Home", the third ending theme for Puella Magi Madoka Magica, and arranged versions of "Secret Base (Kimi ga Kureta Mono)" for the ending theme of Anohana. He was also a close friend of musician Kenshi Yonezu (who produced Vocaloid music under the name Hachi). Following wowaka's death, Yonezu publicly expressed his profound respect for him, noting that his own musical style had been heavily influenced by wowaka's work.

He died in his sleep of acute heart failure on April 5, 2019.

== History ==
=== 2011–2013: Indie debut ===
In an interview with Natalie, wowaka disclosed that after releasing "Unhappy Refrain", he became mentally exhausted and distanced himself from the scene to protect his well-being, feeling that the pressure for fame and success had overshadowed the authenticity of the music. He met Yumao and ygarshy online later that year and formed the band, previously named "hitori atelier" (ひとりアトリエ). In 2012, Shinoda, an acquaintance of both ygarshy and Yumao, was invited to join. They met via Skype, and Shinoda joined the band, which was renamed to Hitorie.

In December, they released their first mini-album "Roomsick Girls Escape (ルームシック・ガールズエスケープ)" independently at Comic Market 83 (C83).

In April 2013, they released their first EP "non-fiction four e.p." independently. Although an indie release, it reached over 10.000 copies sold. Later that month, they held their first one-man live named "hitori-escape" in Tokyo.

On November 4, they held their first sold-out show "hitori-escape:11:4 -Hinichijou Shibuya-hen- (hitori-escape:11.4 -非日常渋谷篇-) (Extraordinary Shibuya Edition)" at shibuya eggman. The same day, they announced their major debut under their own label, "Hinichijou Records (非日常レコーズ)", under the Sony Music umbrella.

=== 2014–2015: Major debut and first album Wonder and Wonder ===
On January 22, 2014, they released their first major single "Senseless Wonder (センスレス・ワンダー)", which played in radio stations all over Japan and was selected for FM802's heavy rotation.

Less than a month later, on February 19th, they announced their first mini-album after their major debut, titled "Imaginary Mono-Fiction (イマジナリー・モノフィクション)".

In April, they performed a one-man tour in Tokyo, Nagoya and Osaka, named "Mannequin in the Park (マネキン・イン・ザ・パーク)", which sold out all venues, including the Ebisu LIQUIDROOM, one of the most popular live houses in Shibuya. They also participated in multiple rock festivals, such as the ROCK IN JAPAN FESTIVAL 2014, WORLD HAPPINESS 2014 and RISING SUN ROCK FESTIVAL 2014 in EZO, gaining more support from fans throughout the country.

On November 26, they released their first full-length album Wonder and Wonder, which featured their debut single "Senseless Wonder". wowaka described the album as:

"I think that until now, I probably had some kind of ego in a bad sense of the word. I can say that now. But in a more pure sense, we have become a band with a one-of-a-kind coolness that only the four members of Hitorie can bring to the table. That is what I originally wanted to do. That's why I think this album has a cool, tingly, tense feeling as a band. In fact, the process of making it was quite stressful (laughs)."

In December, they held their "WONDER and WANDER" tour, over 12 locations nationwide. In Tokyo, their performance at Akasaka Blitz was sold out.

On July 1, 2015, they released their 2nd mini-album Monochrome Entrance (モノクロノ・エントランス). As promotion for the album, all of wowaka's posts on social media, especially Instagram, were in black and white. This went from March 1, to December 10. On the same month, they held their one-man tour "Talkie Dance and Red Shoes (トーキーダンスと赤い靴)", with an additional performance in Sendai. Various venues were sold out.

On November 4, they released their new single "Shutter Doll (シャッタードール)", and re-released their first 2 indie releases as "Roomsick Girls Escape / non-fiction four e.p. (ルームシック・ガールズエスケープ/non-fiction four e.p.)" on streaming services. The release featured remasters of most of their old songs, as well as feature a re-recording of "Kara no Waremono", the first song to be written by wowaka for the band.

=== 2016–2018: Deeper, Iki and Ai/Solate ===
On January 27, their 3rd single "One Me Two Hearts (ワンミーツハー) (stylized as one-Me two-Hearts)", was released as the opening theme for the anime series "Divine Gate (ディバインゲート)". It was Hitorie's first song to be featured in an anime series. The anime received mixed reviews by fans and critics alike, citing a convoluted story and disappointing adaptation. However, Hitorie's opening theme was praised by many for being memorable, even outside the anime's context.

On February 24, they released their 2nd full-length studio album Deeper. The cover art is from an art exhibition called "STILLSCAPE" by photographers Tetsuya Nagato and Taro Mizutani. In March, they started their one-man tour "one-Me Tour "DEEP/SEEK"", over 14 locations nationwide. The tour final was held at the Studio Coast in Shin-Kiba, and was very successful. On August 8th, they released their first live movie and album featuring the performance.

On November 1, they started their one-man tour "HITORI-[E]SCAPE 2016 tour "5"" over 5 venues nationwide. On the 1st of December, they released their 3rd full-length studio album Iki, their 2nd full-length album release on the same year. A talk and autograph event to commemorate the release was held in Tokyo, Nagoya, and Osaka. The album's title, stylized in English, is based on the Japanese word "生きる", which means "to live". It was previously named "Human". Tomoko Ariizumi of MUSICA, says:

"This album "IKI" is a work in which wowaka, after a long period of trial and error since he formed the band Hitorie, was finally able to fully liberate himself in his music, and finally give birth to a pure and true voice. This human liberation inevitably led to the full flowering of his potential as a musician and expressive artist."

A live album tour to commemorate the album's release, named "National one-man tour 2017 "IKI" (全国ワンマンツアー2017 "IKI")", was performed in over 20 locations nationwide starting on January 27th 2017.

On August 22, 2017, wowaka released his final vocaloid song, "Unknown Mother-Goose" (アンノウン・マザーグース) for Hatsune Miku's 10th anniversary compilation album Re:Start. A cover version by Hitorie featuring wowaka's vocals was released 2 months later, on October 22. The song was recorded with Hitorie on both versions, and wowaka sings the chorus on the original vocaloid version, while Miku can be heard on the Hitorie version.

On December 6, they released the mini-album Ai/Solate, featuring "Unknown Mother-Goose" as the lead single. The title is a double entendre, as it can be interpreted as "isolate" or "愛 ("ai", love in Japanese) so late". As promotion for the album, all tracks, excluding Unknown Mother-Goose, and "Zettaiteki (絶対的) (Absolute)", (Note: These two already had music videos released previously.) had short music videos released by the members on social media. The first video released was for the song "NAI.", which was directed by Hidenobu Tanabe (田辺秀伸), who directed the music videos for "Kara no Waremono [ReREC] (カラノワレモノ[ReREC])" and "One Me Two Hearts". The theme was "white". Tanabe's comment on the video:

"Immaculate purity. White, not yet soiled by any other pigment. Beautifully pure. Within that gleaming beauty lurks a swarm of moths. I tried to use the contras" of lurking moths upon an innocent smile to emphasize the idea of 'white'."

The second video released was for the song "Loveless", during their national "IKI" tour, and was directed by Daisuke Shimada (島田大介), who also directed the music videos for "Imperfection (インパーフェクション)" and "Fuyu-no (フユノ)". The video's theme was simply "pink". Shimada's comment on the video:

"The color pink was the only prompt I received, so my initial inspiration was to use the hues of skin. With closeups on the tonality of the girl's skin, and the combination of soft-colored flowers... The video turned quite feminine, yet still with a slightly bare and ominous aura to it."

The third video released was for the song "Namid[A]me". The title is a play on words with the Japanese words "namida" (涙/なみだ) (means "tears"), and "ame" (雨/あめ) (means "rain"). A literal translation would be "rain of tears". The video was recorded by "Ryuka-chan" (琉花ちゃん), which appeared on the album cover for "Monochrome Entrance" and the music video for "Talkie Dance". The video's theme, was described by Ryuka herself:

"I recorded low-key streetlights and the highway at midnight, to enhance a low-key setting."

The fourth and final video released was for the song "Social Clock (ソシアルクロク)". It was directed by Kakimoto Kensaku, who also directed the music video for "Little Cry Baby". The video's theme was "red". Kakimoto's comment on the video:

"In the present country we dwell, what is red, I ask. From nuclear power, the mass media, vested interest, to politics as a whole... Just thinking about it there's no end. If you know it's red and yet get too scared to voice how red it is, then at that point it's already bright red. Every bit of imagery in this video was forged from layers of reds, so the act of releasing this video into the world is virtually red in itself. Red is an amass of energy, I think."

On January 17, 2018, Hitorie performed alongside Unison Square Garden on their two-man live "nexUs Vol.4" at Akasaka BLITZ. On the 28th, they started their "UNKNOWN-TOUR 2018 "Loveless"" in over 10 locations across the country. They also performed overseas for the first time, at additional performances in Taiwan and Shanghai. On October 4th, they started their first overseas tour, called "HITORI-ESCAPE in CHINA "RED HOT POT TOUR"".

On October 28, their fourth single "Polaris" (ポラリス) was released as the seventh ending theme for the anime series Boruto: Naruto Next Generations. A month later, on November 28, the physical version was released with 2 additional songs. One of them was a new song, titled "River Fog, Chocolate Butterfly". The other, was Hitorie's cover of "Nichijou to Chikyuu no Gakubuchi" (日常と地球の額縁), one of wowaka's vocaloid songs. Shinoda said in an interview that the song was one of his favorites and the one that he wanted to play live the most, however wowaka, exhausted from the release of "Unhappy Refrain", neglected the idea. After performing the song in rehearsals, wowaka felt compelled to record the song and include it on the single.

=== 2019: Howls and death of wowaka ===
On January 7, 2019, Hitorie announced their 4th full-length studio album Howls. It released on February 27, and featured their single "Polaris". It was preceded by two singles from the album, "SLEEPWALK", and "Coyote and Ghost (コヨーテエンゴースト)". On the talk and listening party to commemorate the album's release, Yumao revealed that, unlike all their other songs, "SLEEPWALK" was produced solely by wowaka. Although he was hesitant to include it on the album, Yumao heavily pushed wowaka to include it. Production on the song begun after ygarshy suggested that wowaka should write a song by himself again.

From January 21 to January 27, Hitorie hosted a special event titled HITORI-ESCAPE 2019 – A Seven-Day Extraordinary Shimokitazawa Edition (HITORI-ESCAPE 2019 -超非日常下北沢七日間篇-), renting out Shimokitazawa ERA for the entire duration. (Note: Due to wowaka contracting influenza, the one-man live show originally scheduled for the seventh day was postponed and held on February 14 at Shimokitazawa GARDEN.) On the 1st of March, they announced their 2019 tour "Coyote Howling".

On April 8, in an announcement on Sony Music's official website, it was disclosed that wowaka had died 3 days prior, on April 5, in his sleep. The cause of death was acute heart failure. He was 31 years old. A private funeral was held with his family and friends. They cancelled their previously announced tour and offered refunds to all concert-goers, and said the band's future was "currently undecided".

The band's members left messages for wowaka in the same announcement. ygarshy (Bassist) said:

"Even now, I'm still waiting for that moment when wowaka starts playing guitar on stage.

Everyone will be in the audience, and when the leader of the band, waving his right hand, makes a huge sound, the happiest time of my life will begin.

No matter how much I bluff, honestly, I still can't get anything done.

I'm not hungry, and I don't sleep well.

I can't think back to the time when I met wowaka.

I can't stop crying.

I am so sorry that I can't show you the performance with the 4 of us anymore.

Still, I am the only bassist that wowaka chose in this world, so I will never stop playing the bass that wowaka told me he loves.

Leader, you can come and listen to me anytime.

I'll get better tomorrow."

Shinoda (guitarist) said:

"Sorry leader, I'm going to borrow [the] Jazzmaster for a little while longer. I don't know how long it will take, but I will pay you back, so please wait over there."

Yumao (drummer) said:

"wowaka, I don't have anything in particular to say about us in depth at length, but wowaka writes the song, we pick up the instruments, the song is finished, we play it live, and we make the sound. And we sounded great, didn't we?

I'm sorry I annoyed you with all the clumsy things I said in my inarticulate writing.

Thanks again. I'll keep working hard."

On June 1, a memorial concert for wowaka was held, named "wowaka Memorial at Shinkiba STUDIO COAST (wowaka追悼 於 新木場STUDIO COAST)". The venue was selected to be the tour final of their cancelled "Coyote Howling" tour. The concert started with a video of their performance on the "IKI" tour. Later, Shinoda, Yumao and ygarshy took to the stage, with Shinoda being the vocalist and guitarist. He entered the stage holding up wowaka's signature Fender Telecaster. They performed "SLEEPWALK" live for the first time. Before the performance, Shinoda said "I'm not used to this, but I'll sing with a hand mic." After the performance, Shinoda said "That must've reached heaven." Before the end of the set, Shinoda said: "To be honest, we haven't decided anything like 'what we are going to do from now on'... but at least we won't break up." He then introduced the last song, "I'm sure everyone can sing this song. Let's sing it loud enough for wowaka in heaven to hear." They then performed "Rolling Girl", wowaka's signature vocaloid song, with Shinoda's vocals. The concert's encore was a live recording of "Little Cry Baby", from their 2017 "IKI" tour.

On September 2, it was announced that the previously unreleased recordings of their 2018 tour "Loveless" and 2017 tour "IKI" would be released as a single live movie, named "HITORIE LIVE TOUR UNKNOWN 2018 "Loveless"- 2017 "IKI"". Various songs from the performance were released on the band's official YouTube channel. The live movie was released on November 4, which is wowaka's birthday. A day later, they started their 2019 tour "HITORI-ESCAPE TOUR 2019". It was also officially announced that Shinoda became the band's new vocalist.

=== 2020–2023: Return as a 3-piece ===
On March 25, 2020, Sony Music announced that Hitorie provided song for Risa Aizawa from Dempagumi, titled "Abnormal Q". The collaboration originated from Aizawa being a fan of wowaka's work, which led to an offer for him to write the song.

Wowaka handled the lyrics, composition, and arrangement, while Hitorie performed as the backing band. The recording session had taken place three years prior to its release. The song was included as a track on the "First Press Limited Edition B" version of Dempagumi.inc's sixth album Ai ga Chikyū Sukuunsa! Datte Dempagumi.inc wa Family desho (愛が地球救うんさ！だってでんぱ組.incはファミリーでしょ), which was released on April 15, 2020.

On August 19, Hitorie released their first greatest hits album, named "4". Shinoda chose the name to celebrate the time spent as a 4-member band. A tour named "ヒトリエ (Hitorie, in Japanese) BEST ALBUM RELEASE TOUR "4"" was scheduled to be held in 21 locations, but was canceled due to the COVID-19 pandemic. They instead performed a paid live-streamed concert named "Hitorie BEST ALBUM RELEASE Live Broadcast Live "4" (ヒトリエBEST ALBUM RELEASE 生配信ライブ"4")".

On August 26, they provided a song for the group RainDrops from Nijisanji. Vocalist and guitarist Shinoda wrote the lyrics and music for the track "formula", while the band handled its arrangement and performance. The song was included on RainDrops' first album, Biography, released on September 22, 2021.

On December 7, they held a free live-stream concert on their YouTube channel named "HITORI-ESCAPE 2020". On the same day, they also announced and released their first single as 3-piece band, named "curved edge". The lyrics and music were written by Shinoda, and the song talks about his inner turmoil after wowaka's death. The song's title was inspired by the term Straight edge, a subculture of hardcore punk whose adherents refrain from using alcohol, tobacco, and recreational drugs in reaction to the punk subculture's excesses. Shinoda says "I'm a proper adult so of course I'm not straight edge, I'm more twisted and curved." It is also a reference to the curved edge in swords.

On the livestream, they also announced their 5th full-length album, and their 1st album as a 3-piece, named Reamp. It released on February 17, 2021. It is their first album to feature songs composed by more than one member, as ygarshy and Yumao wrote 2 songs, each. ygarshy composed "dirty" and "Image (イメージ)", and Yumao composed "faceless enemy" and "YUBIKIRI". Shinoda composed the remaining songs, and also wrote all the album's lyrics.

On April 21, 2021, they started their 2021 tour "ヒトリエ Amplified Tour 2021", over 16 locations. On May 1, their 5th single, "3 min 29 sec" (3分29秒) was released as the opening for the first season of the anime adaptation of 86 (Eighty Six). The physical version was released on July 2, featuring a new song called "milk tablet", and instrumental versions. The Blu-Ray/DVD version contained a recording of their online concert "HITORI-ESCAPE 2021 -Super Non-Everyday Roppongi 7th Anniversary Episode- (HITORI-ESCAPE 2021 -超非日常六本木七周年篇-)". The song peaked at 22nd on the Oricon charts.

On January 19, 2022, they released their 2nd live movie and album of their 2021 tour, named "Amplified Tour 2021 at OSAKA".

On January 26, 2022, they released their new digital single "Stereo Juvenile (ステレオジュブナイル)". It was composed by Yumao, and Shinoda wrote the lyrics. On February 8, they started their 2022 tour "HITORI-ESCAPE TOUR 2022".

On April 30, their 6th single, "Kaze, Hana (風、花) (Wind, Flower)", was released as the ending theme for the anime adaptation of Dance Dance Danseur. The physical version was released on May 25, and featured a new song, "undo", and instrumental versions. "Kaze, Hana" was composed by Yumao, and Shinoda composed "undo" and wrote both of the songs' lyrics.

On June 22, they released their 6th full-length studio album, and 2nd album as a 3-piece band, named "PHARMACY". The album contained their previously released singles, "3 min 29 sec", "Stereo Juvenile" and "Kaze, Hana". As with "REAMP", all 3 members wrote music for the album, however Yumao wrote 3 songs, and ygarshy only composed 1. Yumao composed "Kaze, Hana", "Deneikaiki (電影回帰)" and "Stereo Juvenile", while ygarshy composed "Quit." Shinoda composed the remaining songs' music and wrote all the album's lyrics. Shinoda designed and created a cat plushie inspired by the one on the album's cover art, named "Pharmacy Cat (ファーマシー猫)", and was sold as an official merch item. The album's release tour, "Summer flight tour 2022" was held starting on July 16. The tour final was held at Zepp Haneda.

On July 8, they performed as the backing band on the track "Endroll" by singer-songwriter Yoh Kamiyama, which served as the ending theme for the anime BLEACH: Thousand-Year Blood War – The Separation. The band also participated in a studio live performance video for the song, which premiered on YouTube Music Weekend on August 25, 2023.

On December 2, a one-man live named "Roomsick Girls Escape 10 Years Later (10年後のルームシック・ガールズエスケープ)" was held at Shibuya CLUB QUATTRO to commemorate the 10th Anniversary of their indie debut.

In February 2023, they perform as the backing band on the track "D+ has come" for the voice actress unit DIALOGUE+, which was also co-arranged by Shinoda.

On March 10, 2023, they started the "Roomsick Girls Escape 10 Years Later TOUR (10年後のルームシック・ガールズエスケープ TOUR)", featuring 9 performances in 8 locations nationwide.

On November 8, they started their "HITORI-ESCAPE TOUR 2023" with 15 performances in over 13 locations nationwide. On the same day, their new digital single, "Juggernaut (ジャガーノート)", was released. Shinoda wrote the lyrics and music, and describes the title and song as "the feeling you get when playing an electric guitar". He also drew the album's cover art.

=== 2024–present: 10th major debut anniversary and continued activity ===
On January 22, 2024, Hitorie released the single "SENSE-LESS WONDER AFTER 10 YEARS (10年後のセンスレス・ワンダー)", to celebrate the 10th anniversary of their major debut. The first track is a re-recording of the original song, arranged as a 3-piece. ygarshy plays wowaka's rhythm guitar line in the song's intro, on the bass guitar. The second track is a remaster of the original song with wowaka's vocals and guitar. The same day, a new artist photo of the band was released, and on the 23rd and 24th, the "HITORI-ESCAPE 2024 ～10-NEN-SAI～ (Tenth Anniversary)" concerts were held. The first day's theme was "red", and the second was "blue", featuring 2 completely different setlists, with the band's most popular songs, as well as unreleased songs. It was also announced on the 24th that Hitorie would be performing their "HITORI-ESCAPE 2024 10-NEN-SAI ～日比谷超絶野音～ (Hibiya's Transcendent Wild Sounds)" concert at Tokyo's Hibiya Park Concert Hall. They started their nationwide tour on April 7.

On April 15, they released the digital single "on the front line" which was released as the opening to the second part of the second season of the anime adaptation of Mushoku Tensei. The song was composed by Yumao and Shinoda wrote the lyrics. The song peaked at 28th on the Oricon charts.

On April 20, they performed the first of their 3-part two-man concerts named "HITORIE presents VERSUS Series". Where other artists and Hitorie would perform, one after the other. On April 20, the first artist to perform was Tatsuya Kitani at Osaka BIGCAT. On June 6, Kiro Akiyama performed on the Ebisu LIQUIDROOM. The final artist was revealed to be The KEBABS, at Shibuya CLUB QUATTRO on August 21.

On April 26, Hitorie was invited to the YouTube channel The First Take, created by Sony Music Japan. On the first video, they performed "Unknown Mother-Goose". On the second video, released on May 8, they performed "on the front line".

On May 11, 15 years after wowaka's first vocaloid song, 10 years since Hitorie's major debut, and 5 years after wowaka's death, Japanese publishing label KADOKAWA released the book "wowaka Lyrics Collection (wowaka歌詞集)". It features all lyrics written by wowaka, both on his vocaloid works and Hitorie songs, and also features unreleased songs such as "NOTOK". It also features comments by the band members, and fellow vocaloid producers and friends, such as Kenshi Yonezu, Jin, Pinocchio-P, and Tabuchi Tomoya of UNISON SQUARE GARDEN. On May 21, 2025, the book was featured on the news at KTS, a terrestrial television from Kagoshima. It was revealed that it was wowaka's mother who wished to compile his works into a book.

On June 5, they released their double A-side single "on the front line/SENSE-LESS WONDER [ReREC] (オン・ザ・フロントライン / センスレス・ワンダー[ReREC])". Alongside the titular tracks, it features 2 new tracks, "selfy charm" which was composed by ygarshy and written by Shinoda, and "Sakura no Itsuka (さくらのいつか) (Someday in Sakura)", which was composed and written by Shinoda. This is the first release to have songs written by all 4 members.

On September 15, they performed their previously announced "HITORI-ESCAPE 2024 10-NEN-SAI ～日比谷超絶野音～ (Hibiya's Transcendent Wild Sounds)" at Tokyo's Hibiya Park Concert Hall. It was their biggest concert so far, and was completely sold out. Before the concert's encore, Shinoda announced they would hold another tour in January 2025 around Tokyo, Nagoya and Osaka to conclude the 10th Anniversary tour. It was named "HITORIE 10-NEN-SAI FINALE TOUR". They also released a new artist photo, and announced their 7th full-length studio album, to be released on January 22. The Blu-Ray edition will contain the aforementioned concert.

They performed the unreleased song included in the wowaka Lyrics Collection book, "NOTOK". On November 4, it was announced the song would be released 2 days later, on November 6, with a CD released on November 27th. The song contained wowaka's vocals and music, which was re-constructed based on vocal data from a demo wowaka left before his death, and his lyrics and music. The cover art was created by Furukawa Honpo, the same artist who drew wowaka's Unhappy Refrain album art cover. The CD release will feature another unreleased song by him, named "daybreak seeker" which was written during the production of the album "HOWLS", and Hitorie's covers of "World's End Dancehall (ワールズエンド・ダンスホール)" and "Tenohira (テノヒラ)". Aside from NOTOK, all other songs on the CD are sung by Shinoda, but all songs are written by wowaka. Shinoda wrote the lyrics for "daybreak seeker".

On November 30, it was announced that Hitorie's 7th full-length album was named Friend Chord. Released on January 22, 2025, it features the previously released singles "on the front line" and "Juggernaut", as well as a new version of "NOTOK", with Shinoda being the vocalist. On the same day, they also announced the album release tour, "Freaky Friendship Tour 2025", and their first ever collaboration, with vocaloid producer "balloon" (also known as Keina Suda), on the song "WOLF". It was released on December 11.

On December 29, it was announced that Hitorie would be participating as special guests in the 10th anniversary celebrations of the Hatsune Miku Symphony concert series. The band performed at the Yokohama and Kobe concerts, on October 4 and December 27, 2025, respectively. They performed a medley of "Two-Sided Lovers", "Rolling Girl", "Unhappy Refrain", and "World's End Dancehall", also "Unknown Mother-Goose".

On February 12, 2025, Hitorie members contributed to the song "Hōtā ni Saku" (滂沱に咲く) for singer Soraru's sixth album Yumetoki. The track was written by Soraru, with music composed by drummer Yumao. Shinoda performed guitar and Igarashi performed bass on the recording.

In June 2025, Hitorie contributed to the digital album MAGIC by virtual Liver Kaida Haru (甲斐田晴) from Nijisanji. The band provided the track "Dokuhaku" (独白), which was written by Shinoda with music composed by Igarashi and arrangement by Hitorie. In a comment for the album, drummer Yumao expressed satisfaction with how ygarashy's melody perfectly matched Kaida Haru's vocals.

On August 14, Hitorie announced that they had provided a new song to Morfonica, a band featured in the multimedia franchise BanG Dream!. The track, titled "Beauty For" (ビューティ・フォー), was written and composed by Shinoda, with arrangement by the band itself. This collaboration was simultaneously revealed by the official BanG Dream! Girls Band Party! account during the "Summer Presentation 2025" livestream, highlighting the artist tie-up between Hitorie and Morfonica. A full music video for "Beauty For" premiered on the BanG Dream! YouTube channel on September 11, 2025. As part of the collaboration, a cover version of Hitorie's "On the Front Line" performed by Morfonica was announced for release in BanG Dream! Girls Band Party! on September 11, 2025.

On November 3, it was announced that Hitorie had participated in the recording for a cover of their own song "Senseless Wonder" on the solo cover album Tabuchi Tomoya, released on December 3 to commemorate the 40th birthday of Unison Square Garden bassist Tomoya Tabuchi. The band re-recorded the track specifically for the project, with Shinoda on guitar and chorus, ygarashi on bass, and Yumao on drums and chorus. Shinoda also performed as a session guitarist on three other tracks covering songs by The High-Lows, The Pillows, and CreepHyp. Yumao additionally contributed drums to the album's cover of DIALOGUE+'s "Deneb to Spica".

On December 1, the band released a new artist photo, as well as announcing their first fan-club members-only tour, "Hitori-Atelier Tour 2026 Neural-Renewal". On the same day, they also announced a collaboration with virtual Liver Ryushen (緑仙) from Nijisanji on the digital single "sleep sheep syndrome (feat. ヒトリエ)". The song was released on December 3, 2025. The track was written and composed by Hitorie's vocalist and guitarist Shinoda, with arrangement by the band. It features vocals from both Ryushen and Shinoda. According to Universal Music Japan and music news sites, the song is described as a "rock and roll lullaby" with Hitorie's distinctive rock sound. The collaboration originated from a social media interaction where Shinoda had liked a post by Ryushen about being unable to sleep, which later inspired the song's theme.

On December 5, Hitorie announced their digital single "Minikui Katachi" (みにくいかたち), scheduled for release on December 17. The song was written and composed by vocalist and guitarist Shinoda, who also created the single's cover artwork. Shinoda described the track as a song born from the "scratches" of trial and error while figuring out the band's direction as a three-piece, with a peculiar shape among them that drew him in. Ahead of its official release, the full version of the song received its nationwide radio premiere on FM802's program "802 Palette" on December 13.

On December 10, it was announced that Shinoda had written the song "Sunrise Orange" for voice actor Hiroshi Kamiya. The track, featuring lyrics and composition by Shinoda with arrangement and performance by Hitorie, is set to be included as the lead song on Kamiya's 11th mini-album Share Music, scheduled for release on January 28, 2026.

In May 2026, hitorie produced the digital single "PLAMO" for Japanese vocalist 音羽 -otoha- (stylized as otoha). The track, released on May 20, 2026, was written and composed by otoha, with arrangement credits shared between the band and the artist. Instrumental contributions included guitar by Shinoda and otoha, bass by ygarshy, and drums by Yumaо. The announcement was made via hitorie's official website, with distribution handled through major digital platforms.

On June 4, 2026, it was announced that Shinoda wrote and composed the song "Inori, Owareba" (祈り、終われば) for singer Mika Nakashima, with the full band participating in its arrangement and performance. The track was selected as the ending theme song for the third season of the anime series Mushoku Tensei: Jobless Reincarnation, which began broadcasting on July 5, 2026.

On June 11, 2026, it was announced that Hitorie would produce their second collaboration project with singer-songwriter Otoha. The track, titled "Shururerira" (しゅるれりら), features lyrics and music written by otoha, with arrangement and guitar work handled jointly by both artists, alongside Hitorie's bass player ygarashi and drummer Yumao. The song is scheduled for digital release on July 10, 2026, and will serve as the ending theme song for the anime series Thunder 3. Furthermore, a physical single titled "Shururerira/PLAMO", which compiles two tracks produced by Hitorie, is set to be released on August 26, 2026.

On November 2, 2026, Hitorie announced their new digital single "KEDAMONO_AYAKASHI", scheduled for release on November 11. It was their first new song in approximately one year. The track was written by Shinoda, who also created the single's artwork. Ahead of its official release, the full version received its nationwide radio premiere on FM802's program 802 Palette on November 7.

In a comment, Shinoda stated that he generally writes songs with the intention that they should never be forgotten once heard, and expressed high satisfaction with the concentration of that feeling in this track.The single was released digitally on November 11, 2026.

A music video for "KEDAMONO_AYAKASHI" premiered on YouTube on November 12, 2026, directed by keishi kondo. In a comment, Shinoda explained that he had wanted to be filmed by Kondo, a university classmate and longtime friend, after watching Kondo's film "NEW RELIGION". He recounted their shared history and expressed his excitement at finally collaborating on a music video.

== Discography ==
hitorie (ヒトリエ) discography
- Studio albums: 7
- EPs: 3
- Live albums: 3
- Compilation albums: 2
- Singles: 8
- Music videos: 33

As of December 2025, hitorie has released 7 studio albums, 2 compilation album, 3 live albums, 5 mini albums, 8 CD singles, and 9 digital singles.

=== Albums ===
- Wonder and Wonder (2014)
- Roomsick Girls Escape/non-fiction four (2015; compilation)
- Deeper (2016)
- Iki (2016)
- Howls (2019)
- 4 (2019; compilation/best)
- Reamp (2021)
- Pharmacy (2022)
- Friend Chord (2025)

=== Live albums ===
- one-Me Tour "Deep/Seek" at Studio Coast (2016)
- Live Tour Unknown 2018 "Loveless" – 2017 "IKI" (2019) (Note: Not released as a CD or available on music streaming services.)
- Amplified Tour 2021 at Osaka (2022)

=== Mini-albums ===
- Roomsick Girls Escape (2012; indie debut)
- non-fiction four (2013)
- Imaginary Mono-fiction (2014)
- Mono-chrono Entrance (2015)
- ai/SOlate (2017)

=== CD singles ===
- Senseless Wonder (2014; major debut)
- Shutter Doll (2015)
- One Me Two Hearts (2016)
- Polaris (2018)
- 3 min 29 sec (2021)
- Kazehana (2022)
- on the front line / Senseless Wonder [ReREC] (2024)
- Notok (2024)

=== Digital singles ===
- Unknown Mother-Goose (2017)
- curved edge (2020)
- 3 min 29 sec (2021)
- Stereo Juvenile (2022)
- Juggernaut (2023)
- SENSE-LESS WONDER AFTER 10 YEARS (2024)
- on the front line (2024)
- NOTOK (2024)
- Minikui Katachi (2025)
- KEDAMONO_AYAKASHI (2026)
