= Notok =

2024 single album by Hitorie

NOTOK
- Cover art for NOTOK, designed by Fullkawa Honpo. It depicts a disassembled cassette tape with flowers on the top left and bottom right.

Single album by Hitorie
- Released: November 6, 2024 (digital); November 27, 2024 (CD)
- Genre: Pop rock; math rock
- Length: 15:54
- Language: Japanese
- Label: Hinichijou Records, Sony Music Entertainment Japan

Hitorie chronology
| on the front line / SENSE-LESS WONDER ReREC (2024) | NOTOK (2024) | Friend Chord (2025) |

NOTOK is the eighth single by Japanese rock band Hitorie. The digital version was released on November 6, 2024, with the CD releasing on November 27. It is the first release since their fourth studio album, HOWLS, to feature wowaka's vocals, due to his death two months after its release. The cover art was created by Fullkawa Honpo, a close friend of wowaka who also created the cover art for his debut vocaloid album, Unhappy Refrain. The song is included on the band's seventh album, Friend Chord, with Shinoda as the vocalist.

== Production and release ==
NOTOK was first revealed on the book wowaka Lyrics Collection (wowaka歌詞集), released in May 11. It was performed for the first time at Hitorie's "HITORI-ESCAPE 2024 10-NEN-SAI ～日比谷超絶野音～ (Hibiya's Transcendent Wild Sounds)" concert at Tokyo's Hibiya Park Concert Hall on September 15. The band decided to complete the song, as well as daybreak seeker, also included on the single and composed by wowaka, to celebrate the band's 10th major debut anniversary.

They utilized wowaka's compositions, as well as vocal data from his demo recording, to finish and release the song. daybreak seeker was written during the production of HOWLS, and Shinoda wrote the lyrics. He recorded over 100 patterns for the guitar solo at the end of the song before arriving at the final version.

The single also features two covers of wowaka's vocaloid songs, World's End Dancehall and Tenohira, with the former being the fastest song ever performed by the band, reaching 171 BPM (Beats per Minute).

The album cover was designed and created by Fullkawa Honpo, a close friend of wowaka who was also a vocaloid producer.

== Track listing ==
All tracks are written by wowaka.

| No. | Title | Notes | Length |
|---|---|---|---|
| 1. | "NOTOK" | | 2:55 |
| 2. | "World's End Dancehall (ワールズエンド・ダンスホール, Wārusuendo Dansuhōru)" | Cover version. | 3:33 |
| 3. | "Tenohira (テノヒラ)" | Cover version. | 4:50 |
| 4. | "daybreak seeker" | Lyrics by Shinoda. Music by wowaka. | 4:35 |
| Total length: | | | 15:54 |

== Personnel ==
Obtained from the NOTOK liner notes booklet and YouTube auto-generated music credits.

Hitorie

- All members – arrangement
- wowaka – composition, lyrics (#1–3), vocals (#1)
- Shinoda (シノダ) – electric guitar, vocals (#2–4), lyrics (#4)
- ygarshy (イガラシ) – bass guitar
- Yumao (ゆまーお) – drums

Personnel

- Shinjiro "Megane" Hirai (平井信二郎) – mixing engineer
- Yuki Ishida – recording assistant
- Yuhki Shirai – vocal direction & edit
- Atsuro Takada – drum engineer
- Tsubasa Yamazaki (山崎 翼) – mastering engineer (Flugel Mastering)
- Jun Otake – recording assistant (studio SUNSHINE)
- Akio Fukatani – recording assistant (SOUND CREW STUDIO)
- Fullkawa Honpo (古川本舗) – cover art

== Charts ==
Chart performance for NOTOK
| Chart (2024) | Peak position |
|---|---|
| Top Japanese singles (Oricon) | 13 |
| Top Japanese Download singles (Billboard Japan) | 100 |
| Top Japanese Singles Sales (Billboard Japan) | 12 |
