= Pharmacy (Hitorie album) =

Studio album by hitorie
- Released: June 22, 2022
- Recorded: 2021–2022
- Genres: Alternative rock; electronic rock; dance-punk; city pop
- Length: 34:44
- Labels: Hinichijou; Sony Music Associated
- Producer: hitorie

Hitorie chronology
Reamp (2021)	Pharmacy (2022)	Friend Chord (2025)

Pharmacy (stylized in all caps) is the sixth studio album by the Japanese rock band Hitorie. It was released on June 22, 2022, through Hinichijou Records and Sony Music Associated Records. It is the band's second studio album recorded as a three-piece lineup, following the 2021 release Reamp.

The album features three previously released singles: "3 min 29 sec", "Stereo Juvenile", and "Kazehana". Musically, Pharmacy marks a significant expansion of the band's sound, incorporating elements of electronic music, techno, and city pop alongside their traditional alternative rock foundation. The album's title, chosen by vocalist and guitarist Shinoda, reflects the healing nature of the music-making process during a period of personal hardship.

== Background ==
Following the sudden death of original frontman and primary songwriter wowaka in April 2019, the remaining band members: Shinoda, ygarshy, and Yumao, continued as a three-piece unit. They released their first album under this new configuration, Reamp, in February 2021, followed by an extensive tour.

In early 2022, Shinoda experienced a significant decline in his mental health, which affected his daily functioning and performance. He noted that his ability to converse with others and his overall vitality as a musician had dropped to a level that concerned his bandmates. However, he credited the collaborative process of writing and recording the subsequent album with helping him recover. Shinoda stated that music was the sole factor that elevated his mental state to an average level, leading him to title the album Pharmacy (meaning "drugstore" or "pharmacy" in English) as a reflection of the album acting as a personal medicine that guided him back to stability.

== Writing and development ==
All lyrics on Pharmacy were written by Shinoda, while the musical composition was shared among the three members, highlighting their development as individual songwriters. The album is noted for its diverse sonic palette, moving away from the purely guitar-driven rock of their earlier work to include dance beats, minimal techno, and synth-heavy arrangements.

Shinoda cited diverse influences for the album's direction, including the 1990s rave and electronic sounds of Primal Scream's Screamadelica and Denki Groove, as well as the minimal music genre. The opening track, "Flashback, Francesca", was designed with a psychedelic, rave-inspired atmosphere, utilizing unconventional percussion like bongo drums edited to sound like samples. "genogenoge" features a techno-pop approach with a "jet-coaster-like" arrangement and intentionally nonsensical, highly repetitive lyrics meant to be instantly memorable and catchy, akin to a nursery rhyme.

Yumao's compositions also saw significant stylistic shifts. "Kaze, Hana" was built around a 1970s disco and vintage drum aesthetic, utilizing a precision bass and retro synthesizer tones to create a catchy pop song that belies its old-school recording approach. "Deneikaiki" originated as a soft, relaxed demo by Yumao but was heavily rearranged by Shinoda into an aggressive, synth-driven EDM track, fulfilling Shinoda's interest in future bass and electronic production. Conversely, "Flight Simulator" was written as a fast-paced, traditional guitar rock anthem. It was recorded primarily as a live trio with minimal overdubs to capture their raw energy and showcase their proficiency as a three-piece rock band.

The album closes with "Quit.", a ballad composed by bassist ygarshy. The track was inspired by the emotional complexity of endings and transitions, aiming to capture the bittersweet gratitude that accompanies the conclusion of a season or event. During recording, the band's drummer Yumao was specifically influenced by the late Taylor Hawkins of the Foo Fighters, who had passed away shortly before the track's recording. Igachi encouraged Yumao to channel Hawkins' powerful, stadium-ready rock sound, resulting in a drum performance that balances aggressive volume with underlying warmth.

== Promotion and release ==
The album was preceded by the release of three singles. "3 min 29 sec" was used as the opening theme for the anime television series 86. "Stereo Juvenile" was released digitally in January 2022. "Kaze, Hana" served as the ending theme for the anime Dance Dance Danseur and was released as a physical single in May 2022.

In the lead-up to the album's release, new tracks received radio premieres. "genogenoge" received its full-length radio debut on FM802's 802 Palette on June 4, 2022, while "Neon Beauty" was premiered on TOKYO FM's RADIO DRAGON -NEXT- on June 17. On the day of the album's release, the music video for "genogenoge" was premiered on the band's official YouTube channel. Directed by Hidenobu Tanabe, the video features a narrative about two sisters dancing secretly while their mother is unaware.

To celebrate the release, the band hosted a special live stream program in collaboration with Space Shower TV on July 2, 2022, broadcast via LINE LIVE and YouTube, where they discussed the album's production and their upcoming tour.

Following the album's release, hitorie embarked on the hitorie Summer flight tour 2022, a 14-date nationwide tour that began on July 16 in Hiroshima and concluded on September 22 at Zepp Haneda in Tokyo.

== Track listing ==
All lyrics are written by Shinoda.

No.	Title	Music	Length
1.	"Flashback, Francesca"	Shinoda	3:38
2.	"genogenoge"	Shinoda	3:04
3.	"Kaze, Hana"	Yumao	3:17
4.	"Neon Beauty"	Shinoda	4:12
5.	"Deneikaiki"	Yumao	3:18
6.	"Flight Simulator"	Shinoda	2:37
7.	"3 min 29 sec"	Shinoda	3:29
8.	"Stereo Juvenile"	Yumao	3:26
9.	"strawberry"	Shinoda	3:24
10.	"Quit."	ygarshy	4:39
Total length:			34:44

== Personnel ==
Credits adapted from the album's liner notes and official press releases.

hitorie

- Shinoda – vocals, guitar, lyrics (all tracks), composition (tracks 1, 2, 4, 6, 7, 9)
- Ygarshy – bass guitar, composition (track 10)
- Yumao – drums, composition (tracks 3, 5, 8)

Additional personnel

- Taichi Nishimaki – photography
- Yukiko Takashima – art direction, design

== Charts ==
Chart (2022)	Peak position
Japanese Albums (Oricon)	18
Japanese Hot Albums (Billboard Japan)	38
