= Kazehana (song) =

"Kaze, Hana"

Single by Hitorie

from the album Pharmacy
- Language: Japanese
- Released: April 30, 2022 (digital); May 25, 2022 (CD)
- Recorded: 2022
- Genre: Alternative rock; disco rock; pop rock
- Label: Sony Music Associated Records
- Composer: Yumao
- Lyricist: Shinoda
- Producer: Hitorie

Music video
- YouTube

"Kaze, Hana" (風、花, lit. "Wind, Flower") is a song by Japanese rock band Hitorie. It was composed by the band's drummer Yumao, with lyrics written by vocalist and guitarist Shinoda. The song was released digitally on April 30, 2022, and physically on May 25, 2022, through Sony Music Records. It serves as the ending theme for the MAPPA-produced anime television series Dance Dance Danseur, based on the manga by George Asakura.

The track marked a significant turning point in Hitorie's musical direction, incorporating 1970s disco and pop rock elements that expanded the band's sonic palette, and was later featured on their sixth studio album Pharmacy (2022). The single was released in two physical editions, accompanied by a music video directed by INPINE that blended live-action and animation for the first time in the band's history.

== Background ==
On February 6, 2022, it was announced that Hitorie would perform the ending theme for the anime adaptation of George Asakura's ballet manga Dance Dance Danseur. The series, animated by MAPPA and directed by Munehisa Sakai, premiered in the Super Animeism programming block in April 2022. Shinoda expressed his astonishment at the collaboration, stating that he felt "miracles really do happen" and that he re-read the original manga from the beginning to prepare for the song's creation.

== Style, writing and composition ==
"Kaze, Hana" was composed by drummer Yumao and lyricized by Shinoda. The song is characterized by its blend of alternative rock with 1970s disco and pop influences. According to Shinoda, the band members were initially drawn to the word "dance" in the anime's title, which inadvertently led the rhythm arrangement toward an old-school disco style. Although they realized that the "dance" in the anime referred to ballet rather than disco dancing, they embraced the rhythmic approach to capture the tremendous dynamism and physical exertion of the ballet performances.

Yumao aimed to create a distinctly pop-oriented track, utilizing vintage drum kits to achieve a retro feel. Bassist Igarashi complemented this by employing a thicker, groovier bass tone, resulting in a rhythm section that evoked a classic disco vibe while maintaining a modern rock edge. The melody is noted for mixing a sense of painfulness with gentleness, paired with Shinoda's sentimental lyrics.

== Recording and production ==
The recording process for "Kaze, Hana" was described by the band as a pivotal moment in their career. Shinoda noted that the successful creation of a bright, pop-oriented track that still sounded authentically like Hitorie gave the band the confidence to explore a wider variety of musical styles. This realization directly influenced the production of their subsequent album, Pharmacy, allowing them to incorporate diverse genres such as dance music, city pop, and experimental electronic elements without losing their core identity. Yumao and Igarashi expressed satisfaction with the recording, particularly highlighting the unique combination of vintage drums and an uncharacteristically groovy bass line.

== Artwork and packaging ==
The physical single was released in two distinct formats: the Artist Edition (regular edition) and the Anime Edition (limited edition). The Artist Edition features a standard jewel case with a special slipcase for the first press run. The Anime Edition is housed in a digipak and features original anime illustrations on the jacket artwork. Both editions include the title track, the B-side "undo", and their respective instrumental versions. The Anime Edition additionally includes a Blu-ray disc containing the creditless ending sequence of Dance Dance Danseur. Various retail bonuses were also offered, including mega jackets from Amazon, stickers from Tower Records, can badges from Rakuten Books, and clear posters from the Sony Music Shop.

== Release, promotion and marketing ==
"Kaze, Hana" was made available for digital pre-release and streaming on April 30, 2022, preceding the physical CD release on May 25, 2022. A full-length radio premiere of the song was broadcast on FM802's program 802 Palette on April 16, 2022.

The music video for "Kaze, Hana" was uploaded to the band's official YouTube channel on May 24, 2022, a day before the physical release. Directed by visual artist INPINE, known for his work with artists like Jin and Rain Drops, the video marked the first time Hitorie incorporated illustration and animation into a music video, seamlessly blending it with live-action footage of the band performing.

On July 8, 2022, a remix of the song by DJ and producer JLV was released globally on digital streaming platforms under the "SACRA BEATS Singles" label. JLV noted that the original track contained many musical elements he personally enjoyed, which he incorporated into the remix to give it a more electronic taste.

== Singles ==
"Kaze, Hana" was released as a physical and digital single, serving as a precursor to the band's sixth studio album, Pharmacy, which was released in June 2022. The B-side track, "undo", was written and composed by Shinoda. Shinoda described "undo" as a track that evokes a sense of "dance" through its title and rhythmic feel, serving as a complementary piece to the title track. The single's release strategy emphasized both standard and anime-specific packaging to cater to both the band's fanbase and viewers of Dance Dance Danseur.

== Touring ==
To promote the single and their broader discography, Hitorie performed "Kaze, Hana" during the rescheduled dates of their HITORI-ESCAPE TOUR 2022. The tour resumed in late May and June 2022, with stops at Shinsaibashi BIGCAT in Osaka on May 25 and 26, Liquidroom in Tokyo on May 30 and 31, and Sendai Rensa in Miyagi on June 13 and 14. The band also made their first television live performance of the song on the TOKYO MX program Room 69 Resident around the time of the single's release.

== Critical reception ==
While specific professional music reviews were not widely published at the time of release, the song garnered significant attention from both anime fans and the band's listenership upon its television debut. The combination of the sentimental melody and the beautiful animation of the ending sequence generated positive buzz on social media platforms, building anticipation for the narrative of Dance Dance Danseur. Internally, the band and music journalists noted the track as a successful expansion of Hitorie's musical boundaries, proving their ability to deliver bright, pop-centric music without sacrificing their alternative rock roots.

== Track listing ==
All lyrics are written by Shinoda.

No.	Title	Music	Length
1.	"Kaze, Hana" (風、花)	Yumao	3:16
2.	"undo"	Shinoda	3:26
3.	"Kaze, Hana (Instrumental)"	Yumao	3:14
4.	"undo (Instrumental)"	Shinoda	3:26

Blu-ray disc
No.	Title	Length
1.	"Dance Dance Danseur" (Non-credit ending animation)

== Credits ==
Hitorie

- Shinoda – vocals, guitar, lyrics
- Yumao – drums, composition
- Igarashi – bass guitar
- Hitorie – production, arrangement

Other

- INPINE – music video direction
- JLV – remixing (JLV Remix)
- MAPPA – animation (Anime Edition Blu-ray)
