= Reamp (album) =

- Standard edition cover.

Studio album by Hitorie
- Released: February 17, 2021
- Recorded: 2020
- Genres: Rock, alternative rock, garage rock, pop
- Length: 41:11
- Language: Japanese
- Labels: Hinichijou Records, Sony Music Associated Records

Hitorie chronology
Howls (2019)	Reamp (2021)	Pharmacy (2022)

Alternative cover
- First press edition cover art

Singles from Reamp
- 1. "Curved Edge" Released: December 7, 2020; 2. "Yubikiri" Released: January 24, 2021; 3. "Image" Released: February 7, 2021

Reamp (stylized in all caps) is a studio album by Japanese rock band Hitorie. It was released on February 17, 2021. Their first album after the passing of band frontman and songwriter wowaka in 2019 and fifth album overall, it is their first to have music composed by all three members. In 2020, in an online concert, guitarist Shinoda was announced as the new vocalist, as well as the release of the lead single "Curved Edge" that same day, and Reamp in early 2021. The album charted at 29 on the Oricon Combined Albums Chart.

== Background ==
Hitorie released Howls on February 27, 2019, two months before lead vocalist and songwriter wowaka passed away of acute heart failure. The band announced the cancellation of all unrealized performances of their Coyote Howling tour, planned to support the album, and that they'd enter an indefinite hiatus. A remembrance concert for wowaka was announced later that month, and took place on June 1, the same date of their planned tour finale. At the end of the event, guitarist Shinoda said, "To be honest, we haven't decided anything on what we are going to do from now on... but at least we won't break up."

On November 3, they started their 2019 tour Hitori-Escape 2019. Despite being their first tour as a three-piece, the band's members were still undecided in continuing their activities. On August 19, 2020, they released the greatest hits album 4. The name was chosen the honor the time they spent as a four-member band.

On December 7, during their free online concert on their YouTube channel, Hitori-Escape 2020, the band announced and performed their first single as a three-piece band, named "Curved edge" (stylized in lowercase.) The song's title was inspired by the term Straight edge, a subculture of hardcore punk whose adherents refrain from using alcohol, tobacco, and recreational drugs in reaction to the punk subculture's excesses. In a blog post, Shinoda says "I'm an adult so of course I'm not straight edge, I'm more twisted and curved." It is also a reference to the curved edge in swords.

== Writing and development ==
Production on the album started in March 2020. In contrast to the band's earlier albums, which were solely produced and written by wowaka, all the band's members wrote tracks for Reamp, with the goal of writing ten songs in a single month, and made the silent agreement to not write songs similar to wowaka's, but instead create original tracks that still reminded listeners of the band.

Bassist ygarshy wrote the tracks "Image", and "Dirty", which was inspired by garage and 1990's rock music.

Drummer Yumao wrote "Yubikiri" and "Faceless Enemy", being instead inspired by pop. Despite not focusing on creating songs written for Hitorie itself, the members liked the songs and included them on the album. The keyboard in "Yubikiri" was recorded by Narita Haneda, from pop rock band Passepied.

Shinoda wrote the remaining tracks as well as the album's lyrics. The album was not written under a specific concept, but mostly focus on the members' inner turmoil after the loss of wowaka, and the resolve to continue the band in his stead. For "Curved Edge", Shinoda looked at writing a song that was inspired by their previous work including classic riffs, but with a slower tempo.

== Promotion and release ==
Hitorie released the lead single "Curved Edge" on December 7, 2020, the same day it was announced. "Yubikiri" and "Image" were also released, on January 24, 2021 and February 7, respectively, and all three songs received music videos. A music video for "High gain", was released the same day as the album. All three music videos were directed by Hidenobu Tanabe.

The band announced two concerts to support the album. The first, an online concert, Hitori-Escape 2021 Super Extraordinary Roppongi 7th Anniversary Edition (超非日常六本木七周年篇), was held on January 22 at the Ex Theater Roppongi, in Tokyo; And their tour, Amplified, started on April 21 in Nagoya, and ended in July 7, in Osaka, with a total of 16 performances and 10 locations. The Osaka performance was released in 2022 as an live album.

== Track listing ==
All lyrics are written by Shinoda.

No.	Title	Music	Length
1.	"Curved Edge"	Shinoda	3:48
2.	"High Gain (ハイゲイン, Hai-gein)"	Shinoda	3:06
3.	"Dirty"	ygarshy	4:14
4.	"Faceless Enemy"	Yumao	3:56
5.	"Tat"	Shinoda	4:38
6.	"Utsutsu (うつつ, lit. 'Daydream')"	Shinoda	5:50
7.	"Bouquet"	Shinoda	3:26
8.	"Marshall A"	Shinoda	2:54
9.	"Image (イメージ, Imēji)"	ygarshy	4:50
10.	"Yubikiri"	Yumao	4:26
Total length:			41:11

Tracks 1, 3, 4, 5, 7 are stylized in lowercase. Track 2 is stylized in sentence case, and track 10 is stylized in all caps.

== Personnel ==
- All members – arrangement
- Shinoda (シノダ) – vocals, electric guitar
- ygarshy (イガラシ) – bass guitar
- Yumao (ゆーまお) – drums
- Shinjiro "Megane" Hirai – recording, mixing
- Tetsuya Nagato – art director

== Charts ==
Chart performance for Reamp
Chart (2021)	Peak position	Sales
Japanese Combined Albums (Oricon)	29	JPN: 2.418
Japanese Hot Albums (Billboard Japan)	17	JPN: 2.418
