= Deeper (Hitorie album) =

- Standard cover art for DEEPER. It depicts a pendulum against a white, grainy background in blue lighting.

Studio album by hitorie
- Released: February 24, 2016
- Genres: Pop rock, math rock
- Length: 41:12
- Language: Japanese
- Labels: Hinichijou Records, Sony Music Entertainment Japan

Hitorie chronology
Wonder and Wonder (2014)	Deeper (2016)	IKI (2016)

Singles from Deeper
- 1. "one-Me two-Hearts" Released: January 27, 2016

Deeper is the second full-length studio album by Japanese rock band Hitorie. It was released on February 24, 2016, and followed by the album IKI, released ten months later. It includes one-Me two-Hearts as the lead single, which was used as the opening theme to the anime adaptation of Divine Gate.

The album's cover art is from an art exhibition called "STILLSCAPE", created by photographers Tetsuya Nagato, who frequently works on the band's product artwork, and Taro Mizutani.

The album's release tour, one-Me tour "DEEP/SEEK" started in March of that year over 14 locations nationwide. The tour final, at the Shinkiba Studio Coast, was released as a live movie and album on August 8.

== Title and themes ==
wowaka started production on the album without a clear concept or title. After listening to the final songs, he chose the title as he feels he's created something "deeper" than before. The first track's title, GO BACK TO VENUSFORT, is a reference to the shopping mall Venus Fort, in Odaiba, Tokyo. The lead single's title, one-Me two-Hearts, is a double entendre, as it can be read both as "One Me Two Hearts", and "One Meets Her".

== Track listing ==
All tracks are written by wowaka.

No.	Title	Note	Length
1.	"GO BACK TO VENUSFORT"		3:28
2.	"Shutter Doll (シャッタードール, Shattādōru)"		3:33
3.	"one-Me two-Hearts (ワンミーツハー, Wanmītsuhā)"	Opening theme for Divine Gate.	3:23
4.	"Swipe, Shrink"		4:38
5.	"Talkie Dance (トーキーダンス, Tōkīdansu)"		4:19
6.	"Outline (輪郭, Rinkaku)"		3:26
7.	"Fuyu-no (フユノ, Winter)"		5:31
8.	"Bathtub and Sleepwalk (バスタブと夢遊, Basutabu to Yumeyū)"		4:28
9.	"Acquired Backbeat (後天症のバックビート, Koutenshou no Bakkubīto)"		3:09
10.	"MIRROR"		5:13
Total length:			41:12

DVD: Music Video＋特典映像 (Tokuteneizou, Bonus content)
No.	Title	Note	Length
1.	"Talkie Dance (トーキーダンス, Tōkīdansu)"	Music video.	4:40
2.	"Shutter Doll (シャッタードール, Shattādōru)"	Music video.	3:44
3.	"Kara no Waremono [ReREC] (カラノワレモノ[ReREC])"	Music video.	5:13
4.	"one-Me two-Hearts (ワンミーツハー, Wanmītsuhā)"	Opening theme for Divine Gate. Music video.	3:34
5.	"Fuyu-no (フユノ, "Winter")"	Music video.	6:10
6.	"DEEPER 全曲解説＋omake('DEEPER' all songs explained + omake)"	Making of video.	11:18
Total length:			33:59

== Charts ==
Chart performance for Deeper
Chart (2016)	Peak position
Top Japanese albums (Oricon)	26
Hot Japanese albums (Billboard Japan)	31
Top Japanese albums sales (Billboard Japan)	23
