= Friend Chord =

- Cover art for Friend Chord, designed by Yuta Ichinose. It features english text on a blue background, with the album and band's title in the top left and bottom right, respectively.

Studio album by Hitorie
- Released: January 22, 2025
- Genres: Pop rock, math rock, shoegaze
- Length: 37:45
- Language: Japanese
- Labels: Hinichijou, Sony Music Associated Records

Hitorie chronology
| Pharmacy (2022) | Friend Chord (2025) |

Singles from Friend Chord
- 1. "Juggernaut" Released: November 8, 2023; 2. "on the front line" Released: April 15, 2024; 3. "Notok" Released: November 27, 2024

Friend Chord is a studio album by Japanese rock band Hitorie. It is their third album since the death of frontman wowaka and their seventh album overall. It was released on January 22, 2025. It contains the previously released singles Juggernaut and on the front line, which was released as the opening theme to the second cour of Mushoku Tensei Season 2.

== Production and release ==
On November 8, Hitorie released the digital single Juggernaut (ジャガーノート). Shinoda wrote the lyrics and music, and describes the title and song as "the feeling you get when playing an electric guitar." He also drew the single's cover art.

On April 15, they released the digital single on the front line which was released as the opening to the second part of the second season of the anime adaptation of Mushoku Tensei. The song was composed by Yumao and Shinoda wrote the lyrics. The song peaked at 28th on the Oricon charts.

The album also features a new version of NOTOK, sung by current vocalist Shinoda. The cover art was designed by Yuta Ichinose, who previously designed the album covers for on the front line/SENSE-LESS WONDER [ReREC] and Imaginary Mono-Fiction. The DVD version of the album features a recording of their September 2024 concert "HITORI-ESCAPE 2024 10-NEN-SAI ～日比谷超絶野音～ (Hibiya's Transcendent Wild Sounds)" at Tokyo's Hibiya Park Concert Hall. It was their biggest concert so far, and was completely sold out.

== Track listing ==
All lyrics are written by Shinoda.

| No. | Title | Music | Notes | Length |
|---|---|---|---|---|
| 1. | "Tanbika (耽美歌, 'Aesthetics')" | Shinoda | | 4:07 |
| 2. | "Juggernaut (ジャガーノート)" | Shinoda | | 3:14 |
| 3. | "Quadrilateral Vase" | ygarshy | | 3:26 |
| 4. | "Never Understand (ネバーアンダースタンド)" | Shinoda | | 3:49 |
| 5. | "Tsuki o Mirutabi Omoibito (月をみるたび想い人, 'Whenever I see the moon, I think of you')" | Shinoda | | 3:14 |
| 6. | "Shadowpray" | Yumao | Lyrics also written by Yumao | 3:39 |
| 7. | "Notok" (album version) | wowaka | Lyrics also written by wowaka. | 2:55 |
| 8. | "On the Front Line (オン・ザ・フロントライン)" | Yumao | | 3:32 |
| 9. | "Oyasuminasai (おやすみなさい, 'Good night')" | Shinoda | | 6:19 |
| 10. | "Blue Spring Punk (ブルースプリングパンク)" | Shinoda | | 3:31 |
| Total length: | | | | 37:45 |

DVD: HITORI-ESCAPE 2024 10-NEN-SAI〜日比谷超絶野音〜 (Hibiya's Transcendent Wild Sounds)
| No. | Title | Length |
|---|---|---|
| 1. | "SisterJudy" |
| 2. | "Montage Girl (モンタージュガール)" |
| 3. | "Talking Dance (トーキーダンス)" |
| 4. | "curved edge" |
| 5. | "3-min 29-sec (3分29秒, 3-bun 29-byou)" |
| 6. | "Kazehana (風、花, 'Wind, Flower')" |
| 7. | "on the front line (オン・ザ・フロントライン)" |
| 8. | "SLEEPWALK" |
| 9. | "Selfy charm" |
| 10. | "Monocolor (モノカラー)" |
| 11. | "Tenohira (テノヒラ, 'Palm')" |
| 12. | "One-me Two-hearts (ワンミーツハー)" |
| 13. | "Odorumannequin, Utauahou (踊るマネキン、唄う阿呆, 'Dancing mannequin, singing fool')" |
| 14. | "Juggernaut (ジャガーノート)" |
| 15. | "Unknown Mother-Goose (アンノウン・マザーグース)" |
| 16. | "Kara no Waremono (カラノワレモノ)" |
| 17. | "Image (イメージ)" |
| 18. | "Stereo Juvenile (ステレオジュブナイル)" |
| 19. | "SENSE-LESS WONDER (センスレス・ワンダー)" |
| 20. | "NOTOK" |
| 21. | "high gain (ハイゲイン)" |

== Personnel ==
Obtained from YouTube's auto-generated music credits.

Hitorie

- All members – arrangement
- wowaka – composition (#7), lyrics (#7)
- Shinoda (シノダ) – electric guitar, vocals, lyrics (#1–6, #8–10), composition (#1–2, #4–5, #9–10)
- ygarshy (イガラシ) – bass guitar, composition (#3)
- Yumao (ゆまーお) – drums, composition (#6, #8), lyrics (#6)

Personnel

- Shinjiro "Megane" Hirai (平井信二郎) – mixing engineer
- Yuta Ichinose (一ノ瀬雄太) – cover art
- Tsubasa Yamazaki – mastering engineer

== Charts ==
Chart performance for Friend Chord
| Chart (2025) | Peak position | Sales |
|---|---|---|
| Japanese Albums (Oricon) | 19 | JPN: 2.298 |
| Japanese Combined Albums (Oricon) | 44 | JPN: 2.298 |
| Japanese Top Albums Sales (Billboard Japan) | 19 | JPN: 2.298 |
