= Unknown Mother-Goose =

2017 single by wowaka

"Unknown Mother-Goose (アンノウン・マザーグース)"

Song by wowaka
- Language: Japanese
- English title: Unknown Mother-Goose
- Released: August 22, 2017
- Studio: Studio Greenbird, Studio RLN, Studio Megane
- Genre: Pop rock; math rock
- Length: 4:44
- Label: U&R records (vocaloid); Hinichijou Records, Sony Music Entertainment Japan (hitorie)
- Producer: wowaka

Unknown Mother-Goose (アンノウン・マザーグース) is a song by Vocaloid producer Wowaka. It was released on August 22, 2017, and was Wowaka's final vocaloid song before his death in 2019.

A cover version by his band, Hitorie, featuring his own vocals was released 2 months later, on October 22, and was the lead single for their third mini album, Ai/SOlate. The cover version is also included in Hitorie's fourth album, 4.

== History ==
Wowaka began his career as a Vocaloid producer in May 2009 but stepped away from the scene following the release of his album Unhappy Refrain in May 2011.

His decision was influenced by a sense that he had explored the creative limits of Vocaloid music, as well as concerns about emerging trends in the community that emphasized formulaic approaches, such as mimicking his style or prioritizing fast tempos. Seeking a new direction, he went on to establish the band Hitorie, where he took on the role of lead vocalist and guitarist.

During the planning of Re:Start, a compilation album commemorating Hatsune Miku’s 10th anniversary, wowaka was invited to contribute.

The production process for his song took approximately two months. Reflecting on his five years with Hitorie, he noted that his experiences in the band scene gave him a unique perspective, being someone who had actively participated in both the Vocaloid and live music worlds. Motivated by this dual background, he approached the song with the question: "What can I create with Hatsune Miku now?"

== Composition ==
Although the compilation album centered around the theme of "gratitude," this particular song was written with "love" as its core message. In an interview, wowaka shared that it was the first time in his life he had ever composed a song focused on love.

He also explained that he saw himself reflected in Hatsune Miku and approached the lyrics as a deeply personal expression, saying he wanted to “say everything I can say right now” through his own words.

The song runs for 3 minutes and 49 seconds, 222 BPM, and has a vocal range between F♯3 (mid1F♯) and C♯6 (hihiC♯), with the Hitorie version one octave lower. The song was composed by Wowaka, arranged by Hitorie, and used the Vocaloid Hatsune Miku to synthesize the main vocals, with Wowaka singing the harmonies. Hitorie's version used Wowaka as the main vocals and Hatsune Miku as chorus vocals.

The song is noted for its stylistic traits commonly associated with Vocaloid music, including Hatsune Miku’s distinctively clear and synthetic vocal tone, a rhythmically engaging melody that encourages repeated listening, and a rapid tempo. The song’s lyrics are notably compact and intense, with some commentators likening them to a torrent of words. Its overall sound leans heavily into fast-paced rock elements, while incorporating a trap music-inspired approach in its B-melody section. Music journalist Tomonori Shiba regarded it as a uniquely executed form of vocalization, suggesting it may be unprecedented in its delivery.

== Release ==
The song is a part of Hatsune Miku's 10th anniversary compilation album Re:Start. The music video for this song, which was released on August 22, 2017, is a still grayscale image with lyrics subtitles, drawn and produced by Wowaka. The pattern in this video is heart-shaped like Unhappy Refrain, but it is composed of fragments.

On September 11, 2017, Hitorie debuted their self-cover of the song during the "nexUs" joint live event with Passpi, which took place at Ebisu LIQUIDROOM in Tokyo’s Shibuya district.

On October 22, 2017, Hitorie released their own self-cover of the song. In contrast to the original version, this rendition includes Hatsune Miku as a backing vocalist rather than the lead. It was later being the lead single for their third mini album, Ai/SOlate, released on December 6, 2017.

On March 25, 2018, Hitorie included a performance of this song in their nationwide tour, Hitorie UNKNOWN-TOUR 2018 "Loveless", held at EX THEATER ROPPONGI in Tokyo’s Minato Ward. During the chorus, the audience joined in by singing along with wowaka’s vocals. A video recording of the live performance was released on August 22, 2018, marking the one-year anniversary of the original music video’s debut. The live version, titled "Unknown Mother Goose 2018.3.25 LIVE at EX THEATER ROPPONGI", was later made available across various streaming platforms and subscription services.

On August 19, 2020, Hitorie released their compilation album titled 4. The song was included as the fifth track on the second disc of the album.

== Reception ==
Member Shinoda described the song as "a scream of the soul that wowaka created".

Writer Shiori Nakagawa consistently evaluated the work as one that highlights the characteristics of wowaka's music. She expressed that despite it being a Vocaloid song released after a long hiatus, "wowaka's voice overlaps behind Miku's," making it a song that belongs both to his band Hitorie and to him as a vocaloid producer.

Writer Minatsume Soga argued that the song presents an antithesis to the idea of "Hatsune Miku = infinite life." She pointed out that wowaka chose the path of creating music with others as a flesh-and-blood human over creating alone with the machine, Hatsune Miku. Meanwhile, the surviving members of Hitorie, as mortal humans, continue their activities, whereas Miku, an infinite existence, will never create music through his hands again. Soga concludes that their current situations follow opposite fates based on their inherent natures.

Music journalist Sennosuke Shiba praised the song's originality, noting its masterful use of "fast, bouncing" rhythms achieved through the deployment of unique Japanese phonemes like the geminate consonant (促音, sokuon) and moraic nasal (撥音, hatsuon).

In a 2020 survey titled "Three Vocaloid Songs Chosen by Creators" conducted by Natalie.mu for "The VOCALOID Collection 2020 Winter," fellow producer PinocchioP selected this song. He described it as "a masterpiece born from wowaka facing Vocaloid head-on with sincerity" and stated it is wowaka's "passion" itself. He rated it as a challenging piece that balances invariance and innovation, reflecting the growth wowaka experienced through Hitorie. Regarding the lyrics, "残されたあなたが この場所で今でも／涙を堪えてるの 如何して、如何して" (You who remained, even now in this place / Are you still holding back your tears? Why, why?), PinocchioP mentioned that he personally likes to think that wowaka was singing about him and others who stayed in the Vocaloid scene even after its boom had passed.

== Legacy ==
The song is frequently performed at the Hatsune Miku "Magical Mirai" event, hosted by Crypton Future Media and TOKYO MX. Additionally, a version sung by Hatsune Miku was featured at the Coachella Valley Music and Arts Festival, held in Indio, California, United States, from April 12 to 21, 2024.

On March 8, 2018, the song was added to SEGA Corporation’s rhythm game series CHUNITHM to coincide with the launch of CHUNITHM STAR PLUS. Later, on November 24, 2020, a Virtual Singer version of the song was featured in Project SEKAI Colorful Stage! feat. Hatsune Miku, another rhythm game developed by SEGA.

On April 1, 2023, the song reaches 10 million views on Niconico and included in the VOCALOID Hall of Myths.

On April 26, 2024, Hitorie performed the song on the YouTube channel THE FIRST TAKE.

On November 30, 2024, singer-songwriter Keina Suda (also known as balloon) covered the song at the MINGLE concert event in Tokyo, where Hitorie was also a performer. Introducing the cover, Suda stated, "Since this is a special night, please let me perform a song by Hitorie, whom I respect. I've been saved by this song many times." He performed his own arrangement of the song, expressing his respect for the band. After the performance, Suda expressed a strong desire to collaborate with Hitorie again.

On December 30, 2024, the Japanese singer Ado performed the song live for the first time at the music festival COUNTDOWN JAPAN 24/25.

Hitorie performed the song at the Yokohama and Kobe concerts of 10th anniversary celebrations of the Hatsune Miku Symphony, on October 4 and December 27, 2025, respectively.

== Charts ==
Chart	Year	Peak position	Notes
Japan Hot 100	2017	91	
Billboard Japan Top Download Songs	2019	93	Hitorie version
Vocaloid Billboard Japan	2022	12	
Vocaloid Billboard Japan	2023	3	
Billboard Japan Heatseekers Song	2024	15	

== Personnel ==
Personnel list adapted from Wowaka's official X (formerly Twitter) post and the song's music video description.

- Wowaka – composition, lyrics, production, electric guitar, mixing, illustration & cover art, vocals (Hitorie version), backing vocals (Vocaloid version)
- Hatsune Miku (初音ミク) – vocals (Vocaloid version), backing vocals (Hitorie version)
- Shinoda (シノダ) – electric guitar
- ygarshy (イガラシ) – bass guitar
- Yumao (ゆまーお) – drums
- Shinjiro "Megane" Hirai (平井信二郎) – mixing, mastering

Recorded at Studio Greenbird, Tokyo. Mixed at Studio RLN, mastered at Studio Megane, Fukuoka.
