= Iki (Hitorie album) =

IKI
- Cover art created by Tetsuya Nagato. It is an oil painting of a vase with flowers.

Studio album by Hitorie
- Released: December 7, 2016
- Genre: Pop rock, math rock
- Length: 41:12
- Language: Japanese
- Label: Hinnichijou Records, Sony Music Entertainment Japan
- Producer: Wowaka

Hitorie chronology
DEEPER (2016)	IKI (2016)	ai/SOlate (2017)

IKI is the third full-length studio album by Japanese rock band Hitorie. It was released on December 7, 2016, ten months after their second studio album, DEEPER. The album's title, stylized in English, is based on the Japanese word "生きる (Ikiru)", which means "to live", or "to breathe". It was previously named "HUMAN".

== Themes ==
The album, much like the title, focuses on the theme of life and humanity. wowaka originally chose the title "HUMAN", but decided to title it "IKI", as it more accurately represents the essence of the album. His reasoning is that his songs have been a form of living and existing, much like breathing.

== Production and release ==
Production on the album started shortly after finishing production on their previous album, DEEPER. wowaka planned on releasing a lead single, but decided to release only the album at the end of 2016. All songs were brand new, except for Hagureno-Color, which was performed at their previous tour, one-Me Tour “DEEP/SEEK”, and included on the performance's live album. Little Cry Baby was the last song to be written, and wowaka considers it the "heart" of the album. He wrote the song in just 12 hours. doppel features a piano played by keyboardist Ichiyo Izawa, member of Japanese rock supergroup The Hiatus.

"KOTONOHA" sample
A sample from the first track of the album. It is a fast-paced rock song that talks about the confusion of trying to understand one's gender identity.

They also announced the album's release tour, named "National one-man tour 2017 "IKI" (全国ワンマンツアー2017 "IKI")", which was performed in over 20 locations nationwide starting on January 27th 2017.

== Track listing ==
All tracks are written by wowaka.

No.	Title	Length
1.	"KOTONOHA"	2:51
2.	"Heart Breath (心呼吸, Shinkokyuu)"	3:07
3.	"Little Cry Baby (リトルクライベイビー, Ritoru Kurai Beibī)"	4:49
4.	"Eve Stepper (イヴステッパー, Ibu Suteppā)"	3:41
5.	"Daydreamer(s)"	3:59
6.	"Lights in the Polar Night (極夜灯, Goku Yatou)"	4:27
7.	"doppel"	4:44
8.	"Hagureno-Color (ハグレノカラー, Hagure No Karā)"	3:54
9.	"Saihate (さいはて)"	5:09
10.	"Glare (目眩, Memai)"	4:26
Total length:		41:12

DVD: Studio LIVE "IKI" Session
No.	Title	Length
1.	"KOTONOHA"	3:08
2.	"Eve Stepper (イヴステッパー, Ibu Suteppā)"	4:00
3.	"Little Cry Baby (リトルクライベイビー, Ritoru Kurai Beibī)"	4:49
4.	"REC Document & Photo Shoot MOVIE"	14:52
Total length:		27:04

== Charts ==
Chart performance for IKI
Chart (2016)	Peak position
Japanese Albums (Oricon)	27
Japanese Hot Albums (Billboard Japan)	29
Japanese Top Albums Sales (Billboard Japan)	23
