= Polaris (Hitorie song) =

Single by Hitorie
- Language: Japanese
- Released: November 28, 2018
- Recorded: 2018
- Genre: J-pop, rock
- Length: 11:23
- Label: Sony Music Associated Records
- Producer: Hitorie

Hitorie singles chronology
"Unknown Mother-Goose" (2017)	"Polaris" (2018)	"Howls" (2019)

"Polaris" (ポラリス (Porarizu)) is the fourth major-label single by Japanese rock band Hitorie, released on November 28, 2018, through Sony Music Associated Records. The title track served as the eighth ending theme for the anime series Boruto: Naruto Next Generations.

The single is their first physical single in nearly three years and the first to include a band arrangement of a song originally released by Wowaka during his career as a Vocaloid producer.

== Background ==
"Polaris" was developed after Hitorie's 2018 "Loveless" tour, which included their first overseas performances. Frontman Wowaka cited the experience of communicating with international audiences as a primary influence, leading him to move away from metaphorical language toward more direct emotional expression.

A lifelong fan of the Naruto franchise, Wowaka re-read the entire manga series to write the title track. He sought to connect the "solitude" of the series' protagonist with his own growth as a performer, aiming to create a song that felt "sparkling" and hopeful despite themes of loneliness.

== Style and composition ==
The single showcases a balance between the band's established experimental rock and a more accessible pop-rock sound.

"Polaris" features a straightforward arrangement and the first intentional use of the pronoun "You" (あなた, anata) in Wowaka's lyrics, representing a shift toward direct human connection.

"RIVER FOG, CHOCOLATE BUTTERFLY" was influenced by Wowaka's solo trip to India. The track combines abstract programmed beats with noise improvisation.

"Nichijo to Chikyu no Gakubuchi (日常と地球の額縁)" was originally a 2011 Vocaloid track by Wowaka. Although Wowaka previously felt "traumatized" by the difficult period in which the song was written, guitarist Shinoda's persistent advocacy led the band to record a live-in-studio version.

== Music video ==
The music video for the title track was directed by Kei Ikeda and stars actor Yoshitsune Ogawara. Filmed on a beach, the video utilizes drones and moving lights to create a sense of scale and openness, contrasting with the "darkness" mentioned in the lyrics.

== Recording and packaging ==
The artwork was designed by long-time collaborator Tetsuya Nagato. Promotional photography was handled by Katsuhide Morimoto, using soft natural light.

The single was released in two editions, Polaris Edition (First Press Limited Edition) which was CD and DVD (containing the music video) with a large hologram tin badge, and Standard Edition (Nichijo Edition) which was CD with a Boruto-themed sticker for the first press.

== Release and promotion ==
"Polaris" was released digitally on October 28, 2018, prior to its physical release. Promotional efforts included a "Polaris Card" at Tower Records, providing buyers with an exclusive code to preview unreleased material. Physical copies included a pre-sale lottery ticket for the band's 2019 nationwide tour, "Coyote Howling".

== Track listing ==
All tracks are written by Wowaka.

No.	Title	Length
1.	"Polaris" (ポラリス)	3:32
2.	"RIVER FOG, CHOCOLATE BUTTERFLY"	4:18
3.	"Nichijo to Chikyu no Gakubuchi (Hitorie Ver.)" (日常と地球の額縁)	3:33
