= 3 min 29 sec =

2021 single by Hitorie

Single by Hitorie

from the album Pharmacy
- Released: June 2, 2021
- Recorded: 2020–2021
- Genre: Rock, alternative rock
- Length: 3:29
- Label: Sony Music Associated Records
- Songwriter: Shinoda
- Producer: Hitorie

Hitorie singles chronology
"REAMP" (2021)	"3 min 29 sec" (2021)

3 min 29 sec (Japanese: 3分29秒, Sanpun Nijūkyūbyō) is a single by the Japanese rock band Hitorie, released as part of the group’s transition into a three-member formation. The title track served as the opening theme for the television anime 86 – Eighty-Six and was the first song recorded by the band after reorganization.

== Background ==
Following the release of their first album as a trio, REAMP, in February, Hitorie embarked on a nationwide tour beginning in April. The tour was seen as a full-scale restart for the band, which had been reshaped after the passing of their founding member wowaka. During this period, the single 3 min 29 sec was introduced as a new work that reflected the band’s evolving identity.

On March 6, 2021, Sony Music Labels officially announced that 3 min 29 sec would serve as the opening theme for the anime 86 – Eighty-Six. The announcement coincided with the reveal of the band’s nationwide tour Amplified Tour 2021, which ran from April to July across ten venues with sixteen performances.

== Style, writing, composition ==
The composition of 3 min 29 sec was led by Shinoda, who provided vocals and guitar. The song was described by bassist ygarshy and drummer Yumao as distinctly "Shinoda-like," with melodic lines, guitar breaks, and bass arrangements that carried his stylistic imprint.

Lyrically, the song was written with dual resonance: it reflected both the harsh circumstances of the anime 86 – Eighty-Six and the band's own transitional state. Shinoda noted that the lyrics were conceived during the early stages of the COVID-19 pandemic, capturing a sense of inevitability and absurdity in the world.

The coupling track Milk Tablet was the most recent song recorded by the trio, contrasting with 3 min 29 sec as their first recording. Shinoda explained that the track evolved from a demo written during the REAMP sessions, reworked with influences from minimal techno. The lyrics expressed personal frustrations and negative emotions, balancing the stylish musical arrangement with a moody atmosphere.

== Recording, packaging ==
The recording of 3 min 29 sec preceded the sessions for REAMP. Shinoda directed the recording process, while ygarshy and Yumao contributed with distinctive phrasing and tone. The bass line was notable for its use of pick playing, emphasizing root notes beneath the guitar solo.

The single was released in two physical formats: an artist edition and an anime edition. The artist edition included a Blu-ray featuring the band’s seventh anniversary concert HITORI-ESCAPE 2021 – 超非日常六本木七周年篇 and a fan club live performance of "YUBIKIRI". The anime edition featured a digipack with newly drawn illustrations from 86 – Eighty-Six and a Blu-ray containing the non-credit opening sequence of the anime.

Both editions shared the same CD content, which included the title track, Milk Tablet, and instrumental versions of both songs. The artist edition was priced at ¥5,500 and featured deluxe packaging, while the anime edition was priced at ¥1,800 and included the non-credit anime opening video.

== Release, promotion, marketing ==
The single was released in conjunction with the anime 86 – Eighty-Six, where the title track was used as the opening theme. The anime, produced by A-1 Pictures and based on the Dengeki Bunko novel series, premiered in April 2021.

On October 8, 2021, a digital remix titled 3 min 29 sec (N3WPORT Remix) – Sakura Chill Beats Singles was released. The remix was accompanied by a collaborative video between Sakura Chill Beats and 86 – Eighty-Six, published on the Sakura Chill Beats YouTube channel.

== Reception ==
Reception to 3 min 29 sec was shaped by the broader response to REAMP. While Shinoda expressed concern that the album had not yet reached enough listeners, Yumao noted that the acceptance was greater than expected, with audiences responding positively during live performances.

Critics highlighted the technical proficiency of the trio, noting the bass' distinctive pick playing and the layered Jazzmaster guitar tones. Shinoda emphasized the importance of continuing Hitorie's identity without imitating wowaka's style, instead focusing on new creative directions as a trio.

The coupling track Milk Tablet was praised for its unique mood, combining danceable rhythms with lyrics expressing personal frustrations and negative emotions. Shinoda explained that the song reflected his interest in minimal techno and was reworked from earlier demos during the REAMP sessions. Reviewers noted that the juxtaposition of stylish musical arrangements with moody lyrics created a distinctive atmosphere.

Live performances during the Amplified Tour 2021 were described by the band as "miraculous", given the challenges of performing during the COVID-19 pandemic and after wowaka's passing. Audience reactions were seen as deeply emotional, with fans both struggling to reconcile the band's transition and embracing the trio's new music. The inclusion of instrumental tracks on the single was intended to showcase the band's sound and commitment to continuing their musical evolution.

== Track listing ==
All tracks are written by Shinoda.

CD
No.	Title	Length
1.	"3 min 29 sec"	3:29
2.	"Milk Tablet"	4:12
3.	"3 min 29 sec (Instrumental)"	3:29
4.	"Milk Tablet (Instrumental)"	4:12

Digital remix
No.	Title	Length
1.	"3 min 29 sec (N3WPORT Remix)"	3:29

== Personnel ==
- Shinoda – vocals, guitar
- Igarashi – bass
- Yumao – drums
