= Ai/SOlate =

2017 mini-album by hitorie

ai/SOlate

EP by hitorie
- Released: December 6, 2017
- Label: Hinichijou Records

Hitorie chronology
IKI (2018)	ai/SOlate (2017)	Polaris (2018)

ai/SOlate is the fifth mini-album by Japanese rock band, Hitorie. It was released on December 6, 2017. The art cover was designed by Tetsuya Nagato.

== About ==
On December 6, 2017, hitorie released their new mini-album ai/SOlate, featuring "Unknown Mother-Goose" as the lead single. The title is a double entendre, as it can be interpreted as "isolate" or "愛 ("ai", love in Japanese) so late". As promotion for the album, all tracks, excluding Unknown Mother-Goose, and "Zettaiteki (絶対的) (Absolute)", (Note: These two already had music videos released previously.) had short music videos released by the members on social media. The first video released was for the song "NAI.", which was directed by Hidenobu Tanabe (田辺秀伸), who directed the music videos for "Kara no Waremono [ReREC] (カラノワレモノ[ReREC])" and "One Me Two Hearts". The theme was "white". Tanabe's comment on the video:

Immaculate purity. White, not yet soiled by any other pigment. Beautifully pure. Within that gleaming beauty lurks a swarm of moths. I tried to use the contras" of lurking moths upon an innocent smile to emphasize the idea of ‘white’.

The second video released was for the song "Loveless", during their national "IKI" tour, and was directed by Daisuke Shimada (島田大介), who also directed the music videos for "Imperfection (インパーフェクション)" and "Fuyu-no (フユノ)". The video's theme was simply "pink". Shimada's comment on the video:

The color pink was the only prompt I received, so my initial inspiration was to use the hues of skin. With closeups on the tonality of the girl’s skin, and the combination of soft-colored flowers… The video turned quite feminine, yet still with a slightly bare and ominous aura to it.

The third video released was for the song "Namid[A]me". The title is a play on words with the Japanese words "namida (涙/なみだ) (means "tears")", and "ame (雨/あめ) (means "rain")". A literal translation would be "rain of tears". The video was recorded by "Ryuka-chan (琉花ちゃん)", which appeared on the album cover for "Monochrome Entrance" and the music video for "Talkie Dance". The video's theme, was described by Ryuka herself:

I recorded low-key streetlights and the highway at midnight, to enhance a low-key setting.

The fourth and final video released was for the song "Social Clock (ソシアルクロク)". It was directed by Kakimoto Kensaku, who also directed the music video for "Little Cry Baby". The video's theme was "red". Kakimoto's comment on the video:

In the present country we dwell, what is red, I ask. From nuclear power, the mass media, vested interest, to politics as a whole… Just thinking about it there’s no end. If you know it’s red and yet get too scared to voice how red it is, then at that point it’s already bright red. Every bit of imagery in this video was forged from layers of reds, so the act of releasing this video into the world is virtually red in itself. Red is an amass of energy, I think.

== Track listing ==
All tracks are written by wowaka.

No.	Title	Length
1.	"Absolute (絶対的, Zettaiteki)"	2:24
2.	"Unknown Mother-Goose (アンノウン・マザーグース)"	4:38
3.	"Namid[A]me"	4:31
4.	"Loveless"	4:48
5.	"Social Clock (ソシアルクロック)"	4:01
6.	"NAI."	4:14

== Charts ==
Chart performance for ai/SOlate
Chart (2024)	Peak position
Top Japanese album (Oricon)	31
Hot Album (Billboard Japan)	43
Top Japanese Album Sales (Billboard Japan)	28
