= Hatsune Miku Symphony =

Orchestral Vocaloid concert series

- Orchestra: Tokyo Philharmonic Orchestra (Tokyo & Yokohama); Hyogo Performing Arts Center Orchestra (Osaka & Kobe); Sapporo Symphony Orchestra (Sapporo)
- Conductor: Hirofumi Kurita
- Start date: August 26, 2016
- No. of shows: 28
- Website: https://sp.wmg.jp/mikusymphony/

Hatsune Miku Symphony (初音ミクシンフォニー) is an annual orchestral concert series where arrangements of Vocaloid songs are performed. It is organized by Warner Music Japan and has been held in several major Japanese cities, particularly Tokyo, Yokohama, Osaka, Kobe, and Sapporo. The concert uses two formats: one with character vocals, and one that is purely orchestral.

== Production ==
The concert is produced by Warner Music Japan. Behind the scenes, a team of around four or five arrangers work on adapting popular Vocaloid songs into orchestral versions. The earlier concerts featured more classical-inspired arrangements, while later concerts' arrangements tend to stay closer to the original song.

The event has been held in several major Japanese cities, including Tokyo, Yokohama, Osaka, Kobe, and Sapporo. The Tokyo and Yokohama performances feature the Tokyo Philharmonic Orchestra, the Osaka and Kobe performances feature the Hyogo Performing Arts Center Orchestra, and the Sapporo performances feature the Sapporo Symphony Orchestra. The concert's conductor is Hirofumi Kurita.

Originally, the concert was performed alongside projections of music videos and other footage of Hatsune Miku and the other Vocaloid characters, though in 2020, the concert was held for the first time as a purely classical-style concert with no background projections, leading to two different concert formats being performed at different venues.

Vocaloid producer Mitchie M was commissioned to compose the first concert's theme, "Mirai Jokyoku" (未来序曲), as well as the tenth anniversary concert's theme, "Play On".

== History ==
=== 2010s ===
Hatsune Miku Symphony was initially conceived by Toshitaka Ikeda, who previously worked for Exit Tunes overseeing the production of Vocaloid-related album releases. He came up with the concept after transitioning jobs to Warner Music Japan, where a co-worker had previously been involved in the handling of orchestral concerts based on the Tales series of games. In an interview with Domingo, he also names Disney orchestral concerts as an influence, which he had attended and wondered about whether a Vocaloid version could be possible.

The first concert was held at Tokyo's International Forum Hall A on August 26, 2016. It was held in anticipation of Hatsune Miku's tenth anniversary, which was next year in 2017.

2017 saw two concerts held, one in Osaka at Festival Hall on November 17th, and one in Tokyo on November 29th.

The 2018-2019 Yokohama concert was held on November 24th, 2018 at Pacifico Yokohama. It was followed by the Osaka concert on January 25th, 2019 at Orix Theater. This event featured a melody for the Utau character Kasane Teto, as well as a melody for the tenth anniversary of Snow Miku, and a special Miku and Megurine Luka duet by Mitchie M for Luka's tenth anniversary.

The 2019 Yokohama concert was held on October 14th, and the Osaka concert on December 23rd at Festival Hall. It featured a special Meiko melody to celebrate her 15th anniversary, alongside another melody dedicated to Project Diva for its tenth.

=== 2020s ===
The 2020 Tokyo concert was the first to be held at Suntory Hall on May 24th, marking the beginning of the split format, with this performance being entirely orchestral with no character vocals. The Yokohama concert was held on October 17th, and the Osaka concert on November 27th. Hatsune Miku's voice provider Saki Fujita MCed for the first time this year.

The 2021 Yokohama concert was held on September 20th, and was followed by the first Kobe concert at the Kobe International Conference Center on November 20th. This event celebrated the anniversary of Kaito.

The 2022 Tokyo concert was held on July 31. It celebrated the 15th anniversary of Hatsune Miku, along with Kagamine Rin & Kagamine Len. The Yokohama concert followed on September 25th, then the Osaka concert on November 23rd at the Symphony Hall.

The 2023 Tokyo concert was held on August 29th, followed by the Yokohama concert on October 14th. The Kobe concert was held on December 23rd.

The 2024 Tokyo concert was held on April 27th, followed by the Yokohama concert on October 5th and the Kobe concert on December 29th. It celebrated the 15th anniversary of Megurine Luka.

The tenth anniversary concert, held on February 11, 2025, was the first to be held in Sapporo, the city that Crypton Future Media is based in, at the Sapporo Concert Hall. It was followed by the Osaka concert on April 12th at the Symphony Hall, the Tokyo performance on July 6th, and the Yokohama one on December 27th. The Kobe concert was held on December 29th. The rock band Hitorie performed as a guest at the Yokohama and Kobe concerts.

The 2026-2027 Yokohama concert was held on October 10th, 2026.

== Merchandise ==
Several products based on the concert series have been sold, including figures based on various years' Hatsune Miku designs and a plushie based on the 2022 design. A tenth anniversary book was published on December 27, 2025 by Blueprint, featuring interviews and artwork. A pair of high-heeled shoes were also produced in collaboration with the brand Mayla based on the shoes worn by the 2025 Miku design, and later a matching dress. CDs featuring audio recordings of the concerts are also frequently sold, beginning with the debut concert in 2016.

== Reception ==
Hatsune Miku Symphony has been well-received by fans and journalists. Hashikawa described the 2025 Yokohama concert as "a magnificent and exciting culmination of 10 years of work" that successfully captivated the audience, and mentions how some crowd members teared up at the surprise closing song being Melt, a historically significant song for Vocaloid. Mikiki's Yuki Itaya praised the event's "beautiful visuals" and described how Miku and the orchestra "captivated the audience".
