= Senseless Wonder =

2014 single by hitorie

Single by hitorie
- Released: January 22, 2014
- Genre: Alternative rock
- Label: Hinichijou Records / Sony Music Japan

Hitorie singles chronology
| "Senseless Wonder" (2014) | "Imaginary Monofiction" (2014) |

Alternative cover
- Cover for limited edition of Senseless Wonder.

"Senseless Wonder" (Japanese: センスレス・ワンダー, Sensurezu Wandā) is the debut major single by Japanese rock band hitorie, released on January 22, 2014, under Sony Music Japan’s Hinichijou Records label. Written and composed by lead vocalist and guitarist wowaka, the song blends alternative rock with introspective lyrics, marking hitorie’s transition from independent releases to a major label debut.

== Background and composition ==
Hitorie was formed in 2011 by wowaka, bassist Ygarshy, drummer Yumao, and later joined by guitarist Shinoda. Previously a Vocaloid producer known for Unhappy Refrain (2011), wowaka created hitorie to express his music physically, addressing the detachment he felt in Vocaloid work. He described the band as a return to his band music roots, aiming to reclaim his creative output authentically.

"Senseless Wonder" features a chaotic yet catchy rock sound with intricate guitar riffs, driving rhythms, and emotive vocals, described by the band as "cool but hard to grasp" and "uncomfortably poppy." The lyrics adopt a "girl’s perspective" (少女観), imagining a 14- to 17-year-old navigating self-doubt and longing, which wowaka used to channel real-time emotions.

In Skream interviews, he portrayed the lyrics as a cathartic "one-sided outburst," reflecting immediate feelings rather than structured communication, gaining new meaning through live performance. Unlike his Vocaloid work, the band format infused the track with bodily intensity, capturing hitorie's early struggles and growth. Wowaka noted that his lyrics became more vivid and specific with hitorie, yet retained an open, less somber tone despite their dark appearance, reflecting the band's playful dynamic.

== Production ==
Recorded from August to November 2013, "Senseless Wonder" emerged from a hectic period of live performances, promotional activities, and preparations for hitorie's major debut. Wowaka described the process as fraught with anxiety over adapting his past work to a band format, compounded by tight deadlines that left him "losing composure." The band's collaborative approach involved wowaka presenting melodies and concepts, refined through improvisation and discussion, aligning his fictional narratives with hitorie's sound. Ygarshy noted that wowaka's lyrics, often written mid-recording, drew from real-time conversations and emotions, lending the track a raw, energetic edge. The interplay of each member's contributions created a precarious yet vivid ensemble, balancing meticulous planning with impulsive energy.

== Release and promotion ==
On November 4, 2013, hitorie announced their major debut with the establishment of their sub-label, Hinichijou Records, under Sony Music Japan, during their one-man live show "hitori-escape:11.4 -Non-Daily Shibuya Edition-" at Shibuya Eggman. The debut single, "Senseless Wonder," was released in two editions: a regular edition (SVWC-7979, ¥1,260 including tax) with three tracks and a limited edition (SVWC-7977/7978, ¥2,100 including tax) including a DVD with seven music videos from their earlier work Roomsick Girls Escape. The single gained traction through radio airplay on stations like FM802, broadening the band's audience. Promotion included a performance at COUNTDOWN JAPAN 2013/2014, where the band identified areas for growth, and their first one-man tour, "Mannequin in the Park," in April 2014, with shows in Osaka, Nagoya, and a headline performance at Tokyo's LIQUIDROOM Ebisu, their largest solo venue to date. Wowaka described LIQUIDROOM as a long-held goal due to its iconic status and personal significance. The music video, directed by an unnamed creator, captured the band's raw, experimental energy.

On January 22, 2024, Hitorie released the single "SENSE-LESS WONDER AFTER 10 YEARS (10年後のセンスレス・ワンダー)", to celebrate the 10th anniversary of their major debut. The first track is a re-recording of the original song, arranged as a 3-piece. ygarshy plays wowaka's rhythm guitar line in the song's intro, on the bass guitar. The second track is a remaster of the original song with wowaka's vocals and guitar.

== Reception ==
"Senseless Wonder" was praised for its addictive mix of chaotic rock and pop, appealing to fans of alternative rock and Vocaloid music. The band described its creation as a battle against time and self-doubt, resulting in a track that conveyed raw urgency and emotional vividness. Wowaka's lyrics were noted for their liberated, real-time expressiveness, enhanced by the band's physical performance, with members observing a contrast between their dark tone and hitorie's lively dynamic. The single served as a stepping stone for hitorie's growing recognition, laying the groundwork for their mini-album Imaginary Monofiction in February 2014.

== Track listing ==
All tracks are written by wowaka.

| No. | Title | Length |
|---|---|---|
| 1. | "Senseless Wonder (センスレス・ワンダー, Sensurezu Wandā)" | 4:17 |
| 2. | "Sarattehoshiino (さらってほしいの)" | 5:13 |
| 3. | "darasta" | 2:55 |

== Personnel ==
- wowaka – vocals, guitar, songwriter
- Shinoda – guitar, backing vocals
- Ygarshy – bass, backing vocals
- Yumao – drums, backing vocals
