= Unhappy Refrain =

2011 album by Wowaka

Studio album by wowaka
- Released: May 18, 2011
- Genres: Math rock; electronic
- Length: 1:18:53
- Language: Japanese
- Label: Balloom
- Producers: wowaka; Captain Mirai; acane madder; whoo; Dixie Flatline; Toku

Unhappy Refrain (アンハッピーリフレイン) is the debut and only studio album by Japanese musician Wowaka, independently released by his record label Balloom on May 18, 2011. A Vocaloid record with math rock and electronic influences, Unhappy Refrain features lyrics about depression, suicide, and bullying.

The album was Wowaka's commercial breakthrough, peaking at number six on the Oricon Combined Albums Chart and number 22 on the Oricon Digital Albums Chart. It is ranked among the most influential Vocaloid albums ever made.

== Background ==
Wowaka, previously known as Genjitsutouhi-P, debuted as a vocaloid producer in 2009 with the song In the Grey Zone. (グレーゾーンにて。, Gray Zone ni te.). He released three mini-albums before founding the independent record label Balloom in March 2011, alongside other prominent vocaloid producers, such as Toku P, Fullkawa Honpo and Hachi (Kenshi Yonezu). Unhappy Refrain would be produced 2 months later as the first release under the label.

== Composition ==
The album is characterized by obscure lyrics depicting thoughts of young women in fast-paced melodies, and known for its themes around suicide, depression, and bullying. The album's artwork was designed by Gaph, with art direction by Fullkawa Honpo, a close friend of Wowaka who was also a vocaloid producer. The promotional music videos credited Wowaka by his other alias, Genjitsutouhi-P (現実逃避P), coming from the phrase "Escaping from reality, how nice!" (In Japanese: 現実逃避って、いいよね！).

Wowaka credited Hatsune Miku as his influence for his music and Unhappy Refrain, stating: "I never gave it a second of thought 10 years ago as I posted songs, but no matter how you look at it, Hatsune Miku is the one who got me to start music. Miku is sort of like a mother figure to me." However, the darker subject matter of the record led Wowaka to depart the Vocaloid industry, which he claimed was to protect his well-being.

== Legacy ==
The album was commercially successful, peaking at number six on the Oricon Combined Albums Chart for 13 weeks straight and number 22 on the Oricon Digital Albums Chart. Unhappy Refrain inspired many Vocaloid producers and fans to create covers and derivative works based on his songs. Musician Kenshi Yonezu, previously a Vocaloid producer under the name Hachi, was a close friend of wowaka. He praised him for having a deep impact on the concept of "Vocaloid-esque" music among Vocaloid creators, and that since his own music was also influenced by wowaka, he held his greatest respect for him. Other musicians that feature wowaka as an inspiration include Inabakumori.

== Track listing ==
=== Original release ===
All music and lyrics written by Wowaka.

No.	Title	Length
1.	"Unhappy Refrain (アンハッピーリフレイン)"	3:45
2.	"Rollin' Girl (ローリンガール)"	3:16
3.	"Tsumiki no Ningyou (積み木の人形, 'Doll of Building Blocks')"	2:56
4.	"Boku no Sainou (僕のサイノウ. 'My Talent')"	4:49
5.	"Nichijou to Chikyuu no Gakubuchi (日常と地球の額縁, 'Frame of Everyday Life and the World')"	3:46
6.	"Tenohira (テノヒラ, 'Palm')"	4:38
7.	"Toosenbo (とおせんぼ, 'In the Way')"	3:33
8.	"Line Art (ラインアート)"	3:33
9.	"Ura-omote Lovers (裏表ラバーズ, 'Two-Faced Lovers')"	3:09
10.	"In the Grey Zone. (グレーゾーンにて。, Gray Zone ni te.)"	2:51
11.	"Zureteiku (ずれていく, 'Out of Step')"	3:38
12.	"Reversible Doll (リバシブルドール)"	3:38
13.	"World's End Dancehall (ワールズエンド・ダンスホール)"	3:38
14.	"Prism Cube (プリズムキューブ)"	3:23
Total length:		49:08

=== Remixes ===
All lyrics written by Wowaka.

No.	Title	Music	Length
1.	"Ura-omote Lovers (裏表ラバーズ, 'Two-faced Lovers')" (reverse Edge mix)	wowaka, Captain Mirai	4:12
2.	"Toosenbo (とおせんぼ, 'In the Way')" (remix)	wowaka, acane_madder	3:27
3.	"Rollin' Girl (ローリンガール)" (remix)	wowaka, acane_madder	3:00
4.	"Boku no Sainou (僕のサイノウ. 'My Talent')" (dnb mix)	wowaka, Toku, pagodes	6:10
5.	"Tsumiki no Ningyou (積み木の人形, 'Doll of Building Blocks')" (rnb mix)	wowaka, Toku, pagodes	5:25
6.	"Zureteiku (ずれていく, 'Out of Step')" (postrock mix)	wowaka, whoo	2:40
7.	"World's End Dancehall (ワールズエンド・ダンスホール)" (dexholic mix)	wowaka, Dixie Flatline	4:51
Total length:			29:45

== Personnel ==
- wowaka – songwriter, composer, producer

Production

- acane madder – producer
- Captain Mirai – producer
- Dixie Flatline – producer
- John Davis – mastering
- Shuichi Watanabe – mixing
- Toku – producer
- whoo – producer

Artwork

- Gaph – artwork

== Charts ==
Chart	Peak position
Oricon Combined Albums Chart	6
Digital Albums Chart	22
