= Wowaka =

Japanese musician (1987–2019)

wowaka
- Wowaka in 2017

Background information
- Also known as: Genjitsutouhi-P (現実逃避P)
- Born: 4 November 1987; Kagoshima Prefecture, Japan
- Died: 5 April 2019 (aged 31)
- Genres: J-pop; dance-rock; post-hardcore; indietronica
- Occupations: Singer; songwriter; record producer; guitarist
- Instruments: Vocaloid; vocals; guitar
- Years active: 2009–2019
- Label: Balloom
- Formerly of: Hitorie
- Website: www.hitorie.jp lineblog.me/hitorie/

Wowaka (stylized as wowaka, Japanese: ヲワカ; 4 November 1987 – 5 April 2019), also known as Genjitsutouhi-P (現実逃避P), was a Japanese singer, songwriter, and record producer. He is frequently ranked among the most influential Vocaloid producers of the 2000s and of all time.

Wowaka began his career in 2009 with the single "In the Gray Zone". His breakthrough year came in 2011, in which he co-founded the record label Balloom, formed the band Hitorie, and released his debut Vocaloid album Unhappy Refrain. The record peaked at number six on the Oricon Charts and remained on the charts for thirteen weeks. It also received international acclaim and a cult following in the genre.

For the rest of his lifetime, Wowaka continued performing with Hitorie as a lead vocalist and guitarist. On 5 April 2019, he died due to heart failure.

== Early life ==
Wowaka was born in Kagoshima Prefecture, Japan on 4 November 1987. He was interested in joining rock bands since his middle school, starting as a guitarist, he joined bands in his high school and college. He was an alumnus of University of Tokyo, and was the leader of the music club "Toudai Onkan" (東大音感). In college, he began composing original music for his band.

== Career ==
Wowaka's first contact with Vocaloid music was in December 2008, when he listened to Livetune's song "Last Night, Good Night". Taking a liking to the song, he was shocked to learn that this song was the work of one man. He then quit his band, and began creating Vocaloid music using Hatsune Miku in April 2009. Wowaka began his musical career in May 2009, by uploading his original Vocaloid music titled "In the Gray Zone" (グレーゾーンにて。) to the Japanese video-sharing website Niconico Douga. In the video of "In the Gray Zone", trying to convey the image of the song without using illustrations of Vocaloid characters, Wowaka used his own drawing instead, and, for consistency, he kept this style in all his later Vocaloid works.

Wowaka's songs published on Niconico are characterised by obscure lyrics depicting thoughts of young women in fast-paced melodies. He has said that although he initially wanted to make music that can only be made using Vocaloid, he later realized the advantages of Vocaloid music. He became known under the name "Genjitsutouhi-P" after writing the phrase "Escaping from reality, how nice!" (Japanese: 現実逃避って、いいよね！, romanized: Genjitsutouhi tte, ii yo ne!) in several descriptions of his music. His works gained particularly large popularity on Niconico Douga. After releasing his self-published album, he helped found Balloom, an independent record label, along with other musicians popular on Niconico Douga.

In May 2011, Wowaka released his debut studio album Unhappy Refrain (アンハッピーリフレイン) under the Balloom label. The album released to widespread acclaim, peaking at 6th on Oricon and with several tracks, including the title track, entering Niconico Douga's Hall of Legends and Hall of Myths. It is considered a classic in the Vocaloid music industry, and is often considered Wowaka's signature work. The tracks, including "Two-faced Lovers", "World's End Dancehall", "Rolling Girl", and "Unhappy Refrain", all attained a cult following.

Following this, wowaka was the composer and lyricist of the single "And I'm Home", which was used as one of the ending theme songs in the 2011 anime series Puella Magi Madoka Magica, and also arranged "Summernoise Version" and "those dizzy days Version" of Secret Base (Kimi ga Kureta Mono) which was the ending theme for the anime series Anohana.

Wowaka was the writer and composer for Hitori Waratte (ヒトリワラッテ), Kakuseiya (覚醒屋), and Egoistic Shooter for LiSA. He also contributed as a songwriter to the debut major-label single of illustrator and singer Akane Aki, a popular creator on Nico Nico Douga. Titled "antinotice / Hanabira" (antinotice / 花弁), the double A-side single was released on 17 August 2011, by Toy's Factory. Wowaka wrote and composed the track "antinotice," which was described as a powerful rock number featuring an addictive, sharp guitar riff and Aki's signature vocal style. This collaboration highlighted the interconnected nature of the Vocaloid and Nico Nico Douga creative community, where producers (Ps) often worked with popular video illustrators and singers. The single's release was accompanied by a collaborative project with light novel writer Shun Ayasaki, titled Futari de Kaite Mita (二人で書(描)いてみた), further blending music, illustration, and literature.

In the same year, he joined the rock band Hitorie as the primary vocalist and guitarist, and shifted his focus towards the band. Hitorie released their debut album Roomsick Girls Escape (ルームシック・ガールズエスケープ) in 2012.

In August 2017, wowaka released his final Vocaloid song entitled Unknown Mother Goose (アンノウン・マザーグース) following six years since his previous works in Vocaloid. The song was created for Hatsune Miku's 10-year anniversary compilation album Re:Start. In October of the same year, he released his own vocal cover version of the song under Hitorie. In an interview, wowaka credited Hatsune Miku for getting him into making music. He stated: "I never gave it a second of thought 10 years ago as I posted songs, but no matter how you look at it, Hatsune Miku is the one who got me to start music. Miku is sort of like a mother figure to me."

On 25 March 2020, Sony Music announced that Hitorie provided song for Risa Aizawa from Dempagumi, titled "Abnormal Q". The collaboration originated from Aizawa being a fan of wowaka's work, which led to an offer for him to write the song.

Wowaka handled the lyrics, composition, and arrangement, while Hitorie performed as the backing band. The recording session had taken place three years prior to its release. The song was included as a track on the "First Press Limited Edition B" version of Dempagumi.inc's sixth album Ai ga Chikyū Sukuunsa! Datte Dempagumi.inc wa Family desho (愛が地球救うんさ！だってでんぱ組.incはファミリーでしょ), which was released on 15 April 2020.

On 11 May 2024, 15 years after wowaka's first vocaloid song, 10 years since Hitorie's major debut, and 5 years after wowaka's death, Japanese publishing label KADOKAWA released the book "wowaka Lyrics Collection (wowaka歌詞集)". It features all lyrics written by wowaka, both on his vocaloid works and Hitorie songs, and also features unreleased songs such as "NOTOK". It also features comments by the band members, and fellow vocaloid producers and friends, such as Kenshi Yonezu, Jin, Pinocchio-P, and Tabuchi Tomoya of UNISON SQUARE GARDEN. On 21 May 2025, the book was featured on the news at KTS, a terrestrial television from Kagoshima. It was revealed that it was wowaka's mother who wished to compile his works into a book.

On 15 September, Hitorie performed their previously announced "HITORI-ESCAPE 2024 10-NEN-SAI ～日比谷超絶野音～ (Hibiya's Transcendent Wild Sounds)" at Tokyo's Hibiya Park Concert Hall. It was their biggest concert so far, and was completely sold out. Before the concert's encore, Shinoda announced they would hold another tour in January 2025 around Tokyo, Nagoya and Osaka to conclude the 10th Anniversary tour. It was named "HITORIE 10-NEN-SAI FINALE TOUR". They also released a new artist photo, and announced their 7th full-length studio album, to be released on 22 January. The Blu-Ray edition will contain the aforementioned concert.

Hitorie performed the unreleased song included in the wowaka Lyrics Collection book, "NOTOK". On 4 November, it was announced the song would be released 2 days later, on 6 November, with a CD released on 27 November. The song contained wowaka's vocals and music, which was re-constructed based on vocal data from a demo wowaka left before his death, and his lyrics and music. The cover art was created by Furukawa Honpo, the same artist who drew wowaka's Unhappy Refrain album art cover. The CD release will feature another unreleased song by him, named "daybreak seeker" which was written during the production of the album "HOWLS", and Hitorie's covers of "World's End Dancehall (ワールズエンド・ダンスホール)" and "Tenohira (テノヒラ)". Aside from NOTOK, all other songs on the CD are sung by Shinoda, but all songs are written by wowaka. Shinoda wrote the lyrics for "daybreak seeker".

== Death ==
Wowaka died in his sleep on 5 April 2019, due to heart failure, at the age of 31. The death was announced on Hitorie's website on 8 April 2019. A private funeral was held by his family members. At the time, Hitorie was in the middle of a nationwide tour that had begun in March of the same year. Concerts scheduled for 6 April in Kyoto and 7 April in Okayama, along with all other tour dates, were canceled.

On 1 June 2019, Hitorie held a remembrance concert.

== Legacy ==
The Unhappy Refrain album has continued to be widely influential and, along with its singles, inspire others to make covers and derivative works. Following his death, fans of Wowaka paid tribute to him on various social media to commemorate his musical and vocal capabilities. On Nico Nico Douga, videos such as Two-Faced Lovers (Ura-Omote Lovers) and the posthumous Unknown Mother Goose received numerous tribute comments, along with messages quoting lyrics from World's End Dancehall such as, "Goodbye, take care." Similarly, wowaka's final tweet, "Reiwa is so beautiful," was flooded with tribute messages, and related words dominated Twitter's trending topics at the time. At Hatsune Miku Magical Mirai 2019 and Miku Expo Europe 2020, tributes were held to honor him.

Various Vocaloid artists have made music with wowaka as an inspiration. Musician Kenshi Yonezu, also known by his stage name Hachi when creating Vocaloid music, was a close friend of wowaka. After his death, Yonezu praised wowaka for having a deep impact on the concept of "Vocaloid-esque" music among Vocaloid creators, and that since his own music was also influenced by wowaka, he held his greatest respect for him.

Aiden Strawhun wrote on Kotaku that "For those who've been part of the Vocaloid community since Hatsune Miku's early days, Wowaka's name carries more than just the weight of nostalgia. It carries a teenage-angsty resonance thanks to songs such as the turbulent, cacophonic "Rolling Girl." [...] Where there is Hatsune Miku, there is Wowaka. [...] With his passing, we've not only lost a huge, immensely influential part of the community but a monumental part of our history. His work, though, will live on. Wowaka did more than create music for a generation. He created magic."

After a brief hiatus, Hitorie continued in September so as to not diminish wowaka's legacy. Band member Shinoda succeeded wowaka as the vocalist. As of 2025, the band has released 3 albums since his death.

On 29 December 2024, it was announced that Hitorie would be participating as special guests in the 10th anniversary celebrations of the Hatsune Miku Symphony concert series. The band performed at the Yokohama and Kobe concerts, on 4 October and 27 December 2025, respectively. They performed a medley of "Two-Sided Lovers", "Rolling Girl", "Unhappy Refrain", and "World's End Dancehall", also "Unknown Mother-Goose".

== Discography ==
=== Studio albums ===
- Unhappy Refrain (2011)

=== Extended plays ===
- The Monochrome Disc (2009)
- World 0123456789 (2010)
- Seven Girl's Discord (2010)

== See also ==
- Vocaloid
- Hitorie
- Hatsune Miku
- Megurine Luka
