= Hyperparasite =

Parasite of another parasite

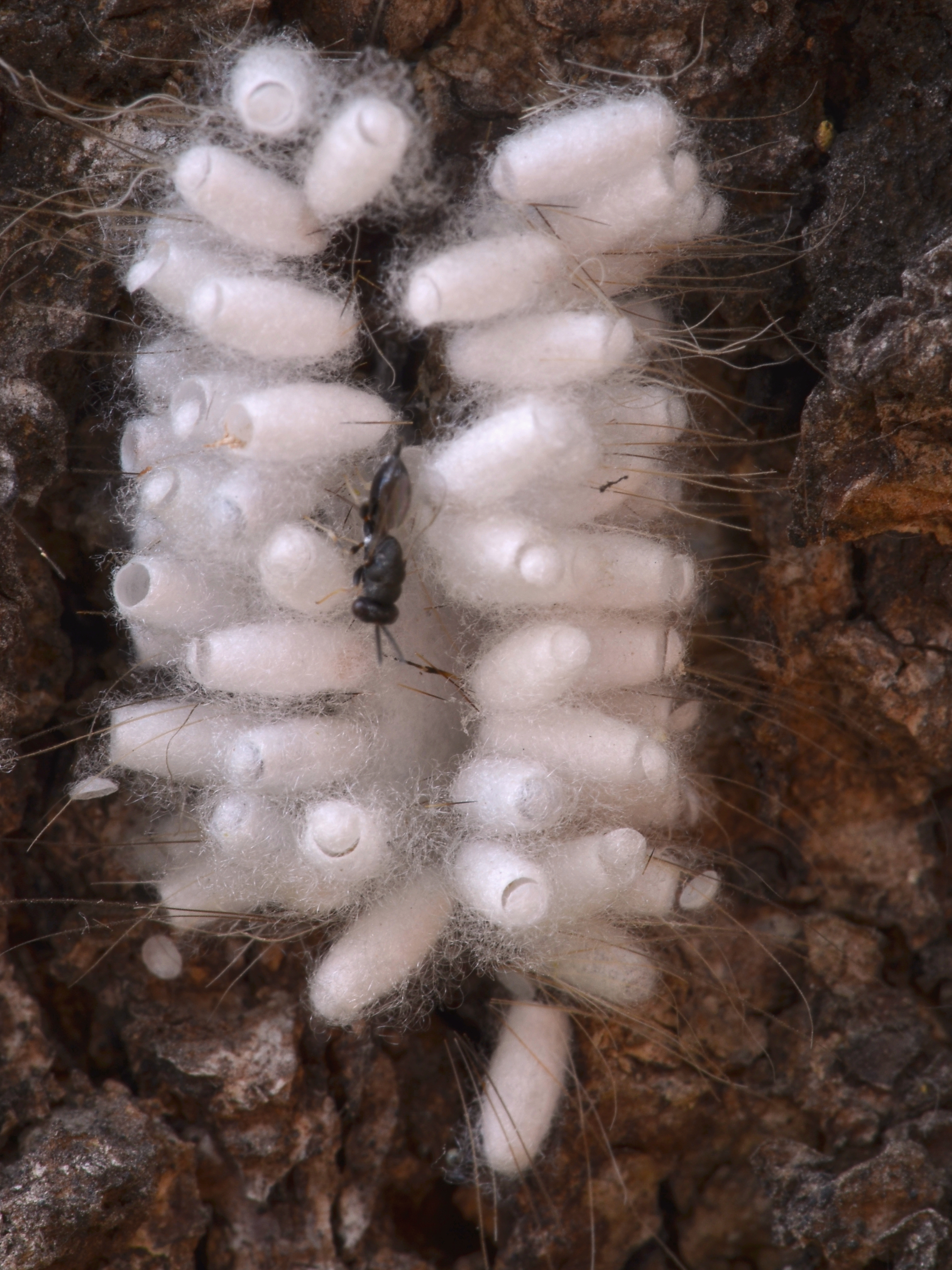
A hyperparasitoid wasp (Pteromalidae) on the cocoons of its host, a braconid wasp (subfamily Microgastrinae), itself a koinobiont parasitoid of Lepidoptera

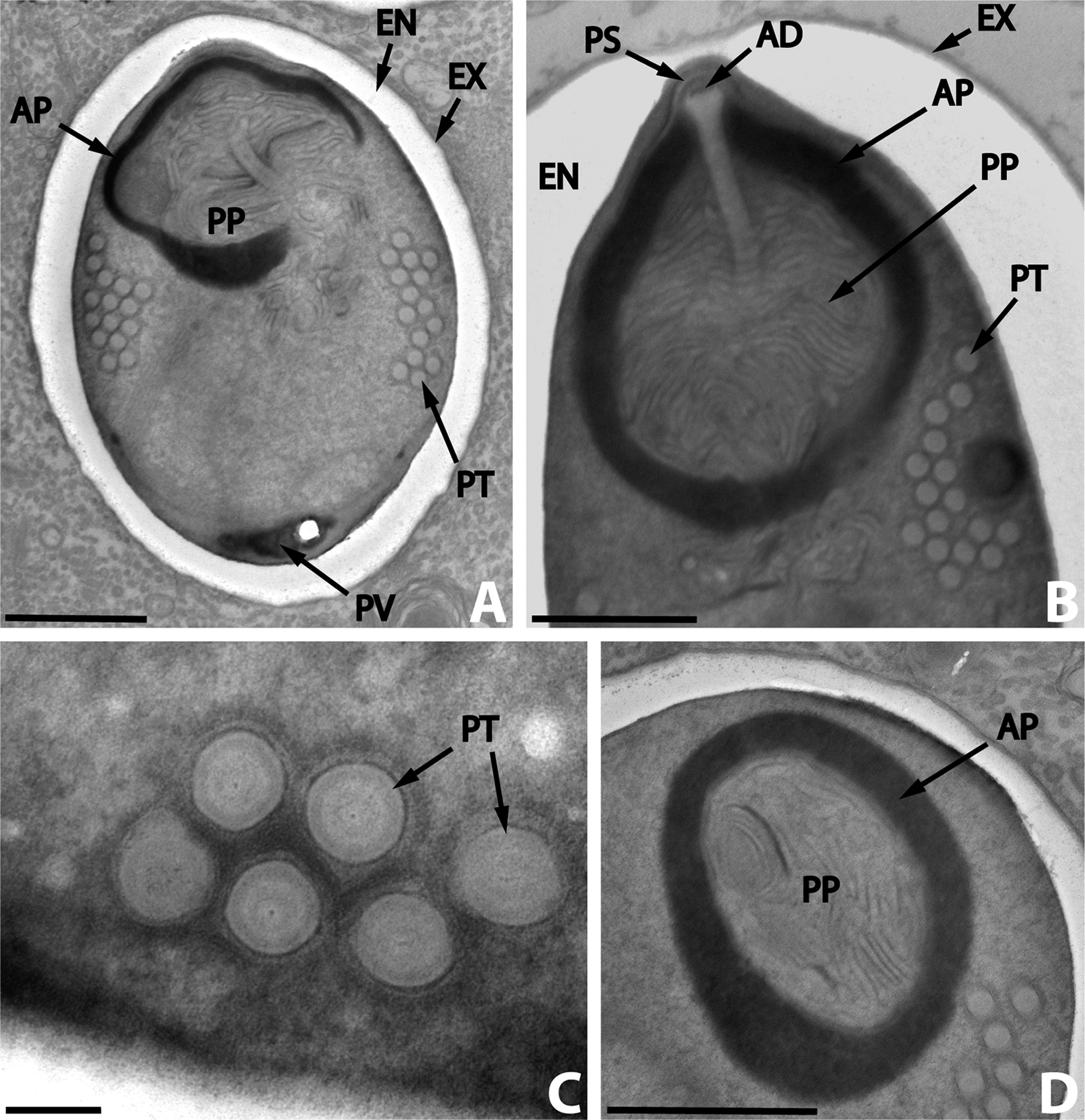
A hyperparasitic microsporidian, Nosema podocotyloidis, a parasite of a digenean, Podocotyloides magnatestis, itself a parasite of the fish Parapristipoma octolineatum

A hyperparasite, also known as a metaparasite, is a parasite whose host is itself a parasite, often specifically a parasitoid. (Note: Parasitoidism is now treated as one of six evolutionary strategies within parasitism.) Hyperparasites are found mainly among the wasp-waisted Apocrita within the Hymenoptera, and in two other insect orders, the Diptera (true flies) and Coleoptera (beetles). Seventeen families in Hymenoptera and a few species of Diptera and Coleoptera are hyperparasitic. Hyperparasitism developed from primary parasitism, which evolved in the Jurassic period in the Hymenoptera. Hyperparasitism intrigues entomologists because of its multidisciplinary relationship to evolution, ecology, behavior, biological control, taxonomy, and mathematical models.

== Examples ==
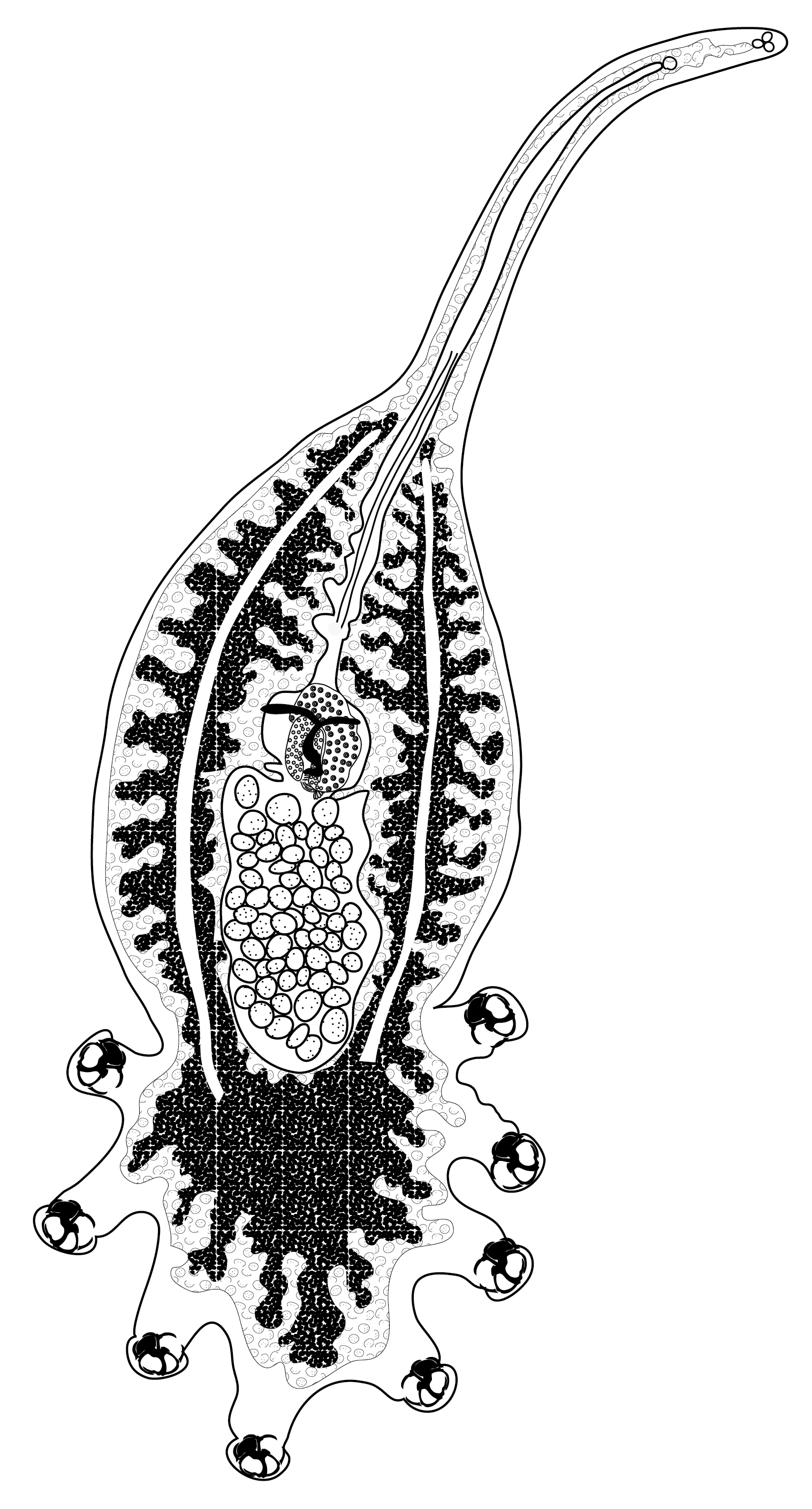
The hyperparasitic monogenean Cyclocotyla bellones is found on Ceratothoa parallela, a cymothoid isopod parasite of the sparid fish Boops boops

The most common examples are insects that lay their eggs inside or near parasitoid larvae, which are themselves parasitizing the tissues of a host, usually the larvae of another insect.

A well-studied host of hyperparasitic species is the small white butterfly (Pieris rapae), a serious horticultural pest of Brassica species such as cabbage and Brussels sprouts. Its larvae are parasitized by the larvae of the wasps Cotesia glomerata and C. rubecula, both of which are in turn parasitized by the wasp Lysibia nana.

Plants may defend against herbivory by emitting volatile compounds. The volatiles attract parasitic wasps that in turn attack the herbivores. Hyperparasitoids are known to find their victims through herbivore-induced plant volatiles emitted in response to attack by caterpillars that in turn had been parasitized by primary parasitoids. The larvae of parasitic wasps developing inside the caterpillar alter the composition of the oral secretions of their herbivorous host and thereby affect the cocktail of volatiles the plant produces.

Hyperparasites are not limited to insects. There are parasitic flatworms that are parasitic on crustaceans, which are themselves parasites on fish. An example is the monogenean Cyclocotyla bellones, found on Ceratothoa parallela, a cymothoid isopod parasite of the sparid fish Boops boops.

== Number of levels ==
There are levels of parasitism beyond secondary parasitism, especially among facultative parasitoids. Three levels of parasitism have been observed in fungi: a fungus (Rhinotrichella globulifera) on a fungus (Gen. Hypomyces) on a fungus (Fomes hemitephrus) on a tree.

== Effect on prey ==
Hyperparasites can control their hosts' populations, and are used for this purpose in agriculture and to some extent in medicine. Damage caused by chestnut blight (Cryphonectria parasitica) in American chestnut trees can be controlled with CHV1 virus, and bacteriophages can limit bacterial infections. It is likely, though little researched, that most parasitic (disease-causing) micro-organisms have hyperparasites which may prove useful in both agriculture and medicine.

Hyperparasitism is to an extent analogous to predation on herbivores, which in turn eat plants, as there are three trophic levels involved. However, hyperparasites are smaller than predators, breed more rapidly than their hosts and are generally found in larger numbers. In the case of micro-organisms, hosts can sometimes clear their infection. Hyperparasitism may thus behave differently from three-level predator-prey systems where predators can exert control of prey populations. However, given the differences between hyperparasites and predators, their effects may need to be modelled differently.

Analogy with predation
Attribute	Hyperparasite system	Apex predator system
Example lower trophic level	Human (ill)	Grassland, forest (overgrazed)
Example middle trophic level	Vibrio cholerae bacteria	Herbivore, e.g. moose or antelope
Example top trophic level	JSF4 bacteriophage virus	Predator, e.g. wolf or lion
Controlling effect	Virus kills bacteria, allows human recovery	Predator kills herbivores, allows ecosystem recovery
Size of top level organism	Very small	Large
Rate of top level organism reproduction	Faster than their hosts	No faster than their prey
Population size of top level organism	Large numbers	Small numbers
Reversibility of effect	Possible, infection may clear	Not possible, prey killed

== In literature ==
Jonathan Swift refers to hyperparasitism in these lines from his poem "On Poetry: A Rhapsody":

So nat'ralists observe, a flea
Hath smaller fleas that on him prey;
And these have smaller fleas to bite 'em.
And so proceeds ad infinitum.

== See also ==
- Hyperparasitoid
