= Ceratothoa steindachneri =

Scientific classification
- Kingdom: Animalia
- Phylum: Arthropoda
- Clade: Pancrustacea
- Class: Malacostraca
- Order: Isopoda
- Family: Cymothoidae
- Genus: Ceratothoa
- Species: C. steindachneri

Binomial name
- Ceratothoa steindachneri Koelbel, 1879

Species of crustacean

Ceratothoa steindachneri is an ectoparasite known as a tongue biter. It parasitises fish by attaching to the tongue, causing atrophy. It then replaces the tongue.

== Description ==
Ceratothoa steindachneri has an oval to rounded body and is generally stocky. It is tan or ivory coloured, with considerable sexual dimorphism in this species, with females (15–23 mm) being much larger than males (4.8-5.3 mm). Females are also more rotund, males are more stocky and rectangular.

== Distribution ==
Ceratothoa steindachneri is found in the northern Atlantic Ocean and the Mediterranean Sea. It was first found in British waters at Whitsand Bay, Cornwall, in 1996 in the lesser weever fish. It has since been found all around the coast of Britain.

== Host species ==
It is a generalist species that can parasitise a wide range of fish species, including the shortnose greeneye (Chlorophthalmus agassizi), lesser weever fish (Echiichthys vipera), red porgy (Pagrus pagrus), comber (Serranus cabrilla), painted comber (Serranus scriba), brown comber (Serranus hepatus), annular seabream (Diplodus annularis), and common two-banded sea bream (Diplodus vulgaris).

Ceratothoa steindachneri has also been reported on Raja asterias, R. polystigma, and R. albas, but these records are yet to be confirmed, as they are most likely the result of trawl transfers.
