= Ceratothoa parallela =

Scientific classification
- Kingdom: Animalia
- Phylum: Arthropoda
- Clade: Pancrustacea
- Class: Malacostraca
- Order: Isopoda
- Family: Cymothoidae
- Genus: Ceratothoa
- Species: C. parallela

Binomial name
- Ceratothoa parallela (Otto, 1828)

Species of fish-parasitic isopod

Ceratothoa parallela is a species of marine parasitic isopod in the genus Ceratothoa and the family Cymothoidae. It lives in the mouth of marine fishes and is particularly associated with the bogue (Boops boops).

== Taxonomy and name ==
The species was described by A. W. Otto in 1828 as Cymothoa parallela. Otto had previously described a similar isopod as Cymothoa directa in 1821. In a revision published in 2000, Tammy Horton concluded that the two names referred to the same species.

Ordinarily, the principle of priority would give preference to the older name. Horton instead applied the reversal-of-precedence provisions of the International Code of Zoological Nomenclature, noting that C. directa had fallen out of use while C. parallela had become well established in the zoological literature. The species has consequently continued to be known as Ceratothoa parallela.

Horton also selected a neotype for the species because the original type material was no longer known to exist. In a 2015 review of the genus, Melissa B. Martin, Niel L. Bruce and Barbara F. Nowak designated C. parallela as the type species of Ceratothoa.

== Identification ==
Adult females have an elongated body with nearly parallel sides. Horton distinguished the species from other north-eastern Atlantic and Mediterranean members of Ceratothoa by a combination of features including a relatively narrow pleon, expansions on the bases of the sixth and seventh pereopods, and uropods that reach approximately to the end of the pleotelson or extend slightly beyond it.

Correct identification is important when interpreting older records. Öktener and Trilles noted that some historical reports attributed to C. parallela may have resulted from confusion with other cymothoid isopods.

== Hosts and parasitism ==
The bogue is the best-documented host of C. parallela. The isopod attaches within the fish's buccal cavity. In a survey from the Erdek coast of Turkey, 13 of 28 bogues examined carried the parasite, corresponding to a prevalence of 46.4%.

A study in the southern Tyrrhenian Sea found considerable seasonal variation in infection. Monthly prevalence ranged from 1.0% in March to 10.7% in October and was positively correlated with mean sea-surface temperature. Infection occurred in the first four age classes of bogue and tended to become less frequent in older fish.

At a given body length, infected fish in that study were slightly lighter than uninfected fish. The authors nevertheless concluded that the infections observed were not a serious threat to survival of the host population studied.

Other fishes have been reported as hosts, but the reliability of some older host records is uncertain because of identification problems within Ceratothoa.

== Association with Cyclocotyla bellones ==
C. parallela is itself used as an attachment site by the monogenean flatworm Cyclocotyla bellones. Specimens studied off Algeria were attached to isopods living in the mouths of bogues. A 2021 study described this three-organism association as a case of hyperparasitism and obtained DNA barcodes from the flatworm, the isopod and the fish.

Further study changed that interpretation. Examination of the flatworm's anatomy and diet indicated that it feeds on blood from the fish rather than on C. parallela. The researchers therefore described C. bellones as an epibiont of the isopod rather than a true hyperparasite in the nutritional sense: the isopod serves as an attachment surface while both organisms obtain resources from the fish.

== Distribution ==
Ceratothoa parallela has been recorded in the Mediterranean and Adriatic seas and in the north-eastern Atlantic. Published records include Turkey, Algeria and the southern Tyrrhenian Sea, as well as the north-western African coast, the Canary Islands and Madeira.
