= Elthusa californica =

Scientific classification
- Kingdom: Animalia
- Phylum: Arthropoda
- Clade: Pancrustacea
- Class: Malacostraca
- Order: Isopoda
- Family: Cymothoidae
- Genus: Elthusa
- Species: E. californica

Binomial name
- Elthusa californica (Schioedte & Meinert, 1884)

Species of crustacean

Elthusa californica is a species of isopod in the family Cymothoidae of the order Isopoda. E. californica is a saltwater parasitic isopod. Like many species of the Elthusa genus, E. californica was first placed in within the Liveneca genus, but later underwent taxonomic revisions.

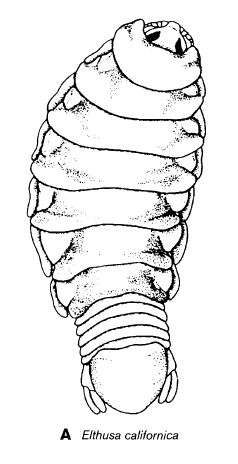
Sketch of a female adult E. californica.

== Anatomy and morphology ==
The body of E. californica is oblong/oval-shaped, typical of the vaulted body shape expected from its genus. On average, the body length is around 16 mm, while the body width is around 7 mm. In general, the body length is slightly more than twice its body width. Due to the slightly shorter body length on the right side of E. californica, the body is slightly twisted.

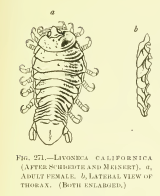
a) Adult female E. californica, lateral view of thorax

The head of E. californica is about 2 mm wide. It is triangular and has a strong and blunt outline on the anterior end. The cephalon posterior margin is not trilobed, once again typical characteristic of organisms found in Elthusa. Two large, oval eyes sit on the postlateral angles on the head. The eyes are set apart by about the width of one eye, making them rather close-set.

On the head, two pairs of antennae may be found. Each pair is made up of eight or nine articles. The antennule is the shorter pair compared to the longer antenna and is shorter than all the pleopod lamellae. The antennule is slender and weak and extends to the seventh article on the other larger pair.

E. californica has maxillipeds composed of two articles, while the mandible has palps made up by three articles. The thorax is typical for Elthusa spp. It is made up of eight segments, where the first segment with the head embedded into it, is the largest, with an approximate size of 2 mm in length. Both second and third segments are equal in length around 1.5 mm. The fourth, fifth, and sixth segments are all 1 mm in length. The seventh segment is then the shortest one with a length of 0.5 mm. Narrow plates called epimerae are separated along the last segments on the thorax. In the last segments, the epimera is capable of fully extending across the segment. The terminal thorax is at the posterior and it is about 4 mm wide and 3.5 mm long.

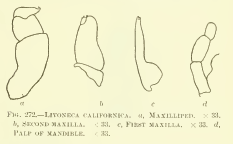
a) Maxilliped. b) Second maxilla. c) First maxilla. d) Palp of mandible

E. californica legs are capable of grasping objects. They also have long and slender dactyli.

In adult females, the pleotelson is as wide as its length, which fits the typical description of the genus.

In juveniles, the color pigment granules are concentrated in the melanophores, thus giving its lack of distinct pattern appearance.

== Distribution, habitat, and behaviour ==
E. californica is commonly found on the shores of California, near San Francisco, hence its species name. It is also distributed along the Pacific Coast from Canada to Peru.

E. californica is an ectoparasite and has been found on many reported host species, including the actinopterygian fishes Cymatogaster aggregate and Atherinops affinis, Artedius lateralis, Clinocottus analis, Oligocottus maculosus, S. marmoratus, and Fundulus parvipinnis. Once it finds a suitable host, it attaches inside the opercular cavity of the gill chamber, making a protruding shape.

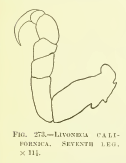
Seventh leg of E. californica

Inside the gill chamber, E. californica feeds on the blood and tissue of the host fish. To ensure secure attachment to the host, the isopod uses seven pairs of sharply hooked legs and its specialized mouthpart. Due to the loss of blood for the host fish, the parasitic behavior of E. californica is thought to influence the host growth process. The presence of E. californica in host fish may subject them to lower levels of vitality when encountering a decrease in the seawater salinity. E. californica is believed to be relatively harmless for the host fish, as its activity usually is not fatal.

The species has an ecological preference, selecting hosts that live in the benthic or demersal zone (on or near the bottom of the sea). Due to its smaller body size and less complex body structure compared to endoparasites, it is regarded as a good indicator for environmental change such as those caused by pollution or climate.

Lastly, E. californica is capable of cross-fertilizing and hybridizing with other species of the same genus, such as the E. vulgaris.
