= Cymothoa elegans =

Scientific classification
- Kingdom: Animalia
- Phylum: Arthropoda
- Class: Malacostraca
- Order: Isopoda
- Family: Cymothoidae
- Genus: Cymothoa
- Species: C. elegans

Binomial name
- Cymothoa elegans Bovallius, 1885

Species of crustacean

Cymothoa elegans is a species of parasitic isopod in the genus Cymothoa. It has rarely been recorded, with all records coming from the north coast of Java. Like other Cymothoa species, C. elegans is a fish ectoparasite.

== Description ==
C. elegans' exoskeleton is calcareous and chitinous. It consists of overlapping tergites that provide protection and flexibility. The body is dorso-ventrally flattened, or flattened in the vertical axis (top to bottom), which is common for marine isopods. They have jointed limbs with non-specialized legs (none modified for purposes other than movement).

== Distribution ==
This species has been recorded off the north coast of Java, Indonesia; in the Java Sea.

== Biology ==
C. elegans is an ectoparasite, living outside their host's tissues. It often attacks the mouth of fish, the lip, inside the mouth cavity, or the gills. These isopods may spend their entire life on one host.

Because these parasites are blood-sucking, they move their food into their esophagus, which is then passed to the stomach (Ruppert). They have adapted mouthparts ideal for clinging and sucking for holding on to their hosts.

=== Reproduction ===
Eggs are held by the female in their brood pouch either inside or outside the body. It is unclear whether or not C. elegans are hermaphrodites, born male and develop into females later in life. This is because of limited specimens, although it is common for other parasitic isopods.
