= List of pathogens by size =

This is a list of pathogens (human or otherwise) in order of size.

Classification	Binomial name	Common name	Dimension	Size	Reference
Flatworm animal	Eucestoda	Tapeworm	length (maximum)	25 m	Eucestoda
Nematode animal	Loa loa	Loa loa	length (female)	20–70 mm	Loa loa
Arthropod animal	Cymothoa exigua	Tongue-eating louse	length (female)	8–29 mm	Cymothoa exigua
Nematode animal	Enterobius vermicularis	Pinworm	length (female)	8–13 mm	Pinworm (parasite)
Arthropod animal	Pediculus humanus capitis	Head louse	length	2.5–3 mm	Head louse
Flatworm animal	Eucestoda	Tapeworm	length (minimum)	1 mm	Eucestoda
Arthropod animal	Sarcoptes scabiei	Scabies	length (female)	0.3–0.45 mm	Sarcoptes scabiei
Metamonad	Giardia lamblia	Giardia	length	10-20 μm	Giardia lamblia
Fungus	Candida albicans	Yeast infection	diameter	10-12 μm	Candida albicans
Bacterium	Borrelia burgdorferi	Lyme disease	length	10 μm	Borrelia burgdorferi
Alveolate protist	Plasmodium	Malaria	diameter (sexual form)	7-14 μm	
Fungus	[many]	[many]	width of hyphae	2-10 μm	Fungus
Bacterium	Yersinia pestis	Plague	length	a few μm	Yersinia
Bacterium	Mycobacterium tuberculosis	Tuberculosis	length	2-4 μm	
Alveolate protist	Plasmodium	Malaria	diameter (asexual form)	1-2 μm	
Bacterium	Mycoplasma genitalium	(one cause of urethritis)	length	600 nm	Mycoplasma
Virus	HIV	HIV	diameter	120 nm	HIV
Virus	Orthomyxoviridae	Influenza	diameter	50-120 nm	Orthomyxoviridae
Virus	Rhinovirus	Common cold	diameter	30 nm	Rhinovirus
Virus	Porcine circovirus	Porcine circovirus	diameter	17 nm	Porcine circovirus

== See also ==
- Orders of magnitude (length)
