= Cymothoa scopulorum =

Scientific classification
- Kingdom: Animalia
- Phylum: Arthropoda
- Class: Malacostraca
- Order: Isopoda
- Family: Cymothoidae
- Genus: Cymothoa
- Species: C. scopulorum

Binomial name
- Cymothoa scopulorum (Linnaeus, 1758)

Species of marine isopod

Cymothoa scoplorum is a species of marine isopod from the genus Cymothoa. It was described by Linnaeus in 1758.

== Distribution ==
This species can be found in the Norwegian Sea and the northern Atlantic Ocean.
