= Anilocra pomacentri =

Scientific classification
- Kingdom: Animalia
- Phylum: Arthropoda
- Clade: Pancrustacea
- Class: Malacostraca
- Order: Isopoda
- Family: Cymothoidae
- Genus: Anilocra
- Species: A. pomacentri

Binomial name
- Anilocra pomacentri Bruce, 1987

Species of crustacean

Anilocra pomacentri is a species of marine isopod in the family Cymothoidae. It is found off the coast of eastern Australia and is an external parasite of the yellowback puller (Chromis nitida), a species of damselfish. The presence of the parasite on a fish causes a significant slowing of the growth rate and an increased mortality.

== Distribution and habitat ==
Anilocra pomacentri is found in the southern part of the Great Barrier Reef in eastern Australia. It attaches itself just above and behind the eye to its host fish, the yellowback puller, a denizen of shallow water coral reefs. It is particularly prevalent on fish inhabiting patch reefs.

== Biology ==
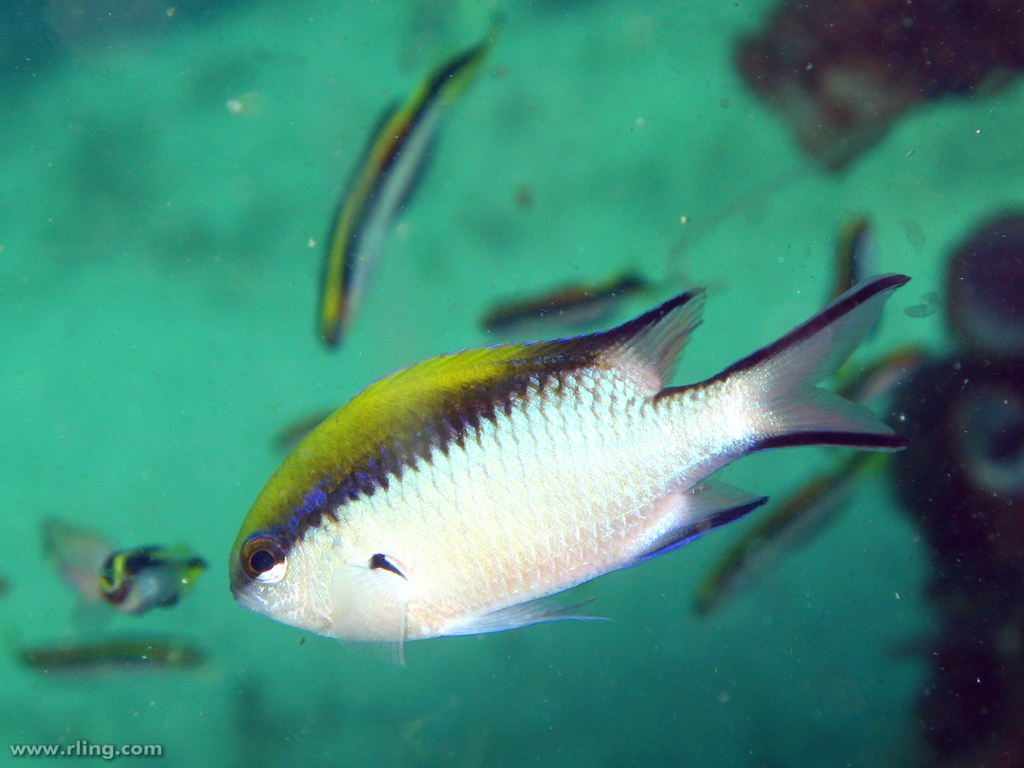
Yellowback puller, the host fish

Both adult and juvenile Anilocra pomacentri parasitise the yellowback puller (Chromis nitida), a small reef damselfish. It seems that the juvenile isopod, known as a manca, latches onto the skin of the fish when both are small and the size of the parasite increases as the fish grows. Anilocra pomacentri is a sequential hermaphrodite. It starts its life as a male and specimens between 4.1 and 7.2 mm (0.16 and 0.28 in) in telson length bear the "appendix masculina" (part of the second pleopod) characteristic of the male stage. It later loses this and becomes a female which sucks the blood of its fish host. The female has a lifespan of about a year during which time it typically produces three batches of eggs, brooding them in the marsupium underneath the thorax. The developing mancae pass through four stages before being released into the sea, by which time they are infective and seek out suitable host fishes. Infected fish show significant reductions in their rate of growth and their fecundity, have a lower number of circulating red blood cells and have an increase in mortality.
