= Nerocila depressa =

Scientific classification
- Kingdom: Animalia
- Phylum: Arthropoda
- Clade: Pancrustacea
- Class: Malacostraca
- Order: Isopoda
- Family: Cymothoidae
- Genus: Nerocila
- Species: N. depressa

Binomial name
- Nerocila depressa H. Milne Edwards, 1840

Species of crustacean

Nerocila depressa are ectoparasitic isopods that attach onto the skin, leaving lesions that can cause problems for their hosts. They are white in appearance with two dark stripes on their sides and are commonly found in coastal waters of the Northern Indian and Pacific oceans. N. depressa can affect the sales of commercial fish depending on factors like environmental conditions and density of stock.

== Impact on host ==
Nerocila depressa are ectoparasitic isopods of the family Cymothoidae, which is generally parasitic towards fish, feeding on their host fish’s blood and muscle tissue. They can attach onto the head, body surface, or fins of the host fish using the hooks of their pereopods (walking legs). N. depressa can leave skin lesions or small pinholes in the hosts body surface from penetration of these pereopods, which can cause infections in the host. Infections caused by N. depressa on host fish can result in reduced growth, anemia, or even death. Behavioral changes have also been observed in fish infected by Nerocila depressa. They parasitize a variety of fish, but Carangidae, Clupeidae, and Engraulididae seem to be the most frequent host families .

== Appearance ==
Nerocila depressa’s body is white in appearance, with two dark stripes along the lateral sides of their body, and no visible eyes. N. depressa has a segmented body containing 7 segments, whose ends are posteriorly directed, with segments 5-7 being the longest. They have 7 pairs of pereopods that gradually get longer towards the posterior part of the body. The biggest specimen of N. depressa known to be found was around 23-27 mm in length.

== Distribution ==
Commonly found in marine and brackish habitats, mostly in coastal areas. Nerocila depressa have been found in warm waters of the Northern Indian and Pacific oceans of India, Thailand, Hong Kong, Taiwan, Indonesia, the Gulf of Tonkin, Pakistan, and Malaysia. Infestation rates are generally highest from October to March, when temperatures are extremely high. Fluctuations in distribution could also be due to seasonal environmental changes such as weather, rainfall, and salinity.

== Effect on humans ==
An increase in Nerocila depressa can cause a decline in fish population of estuary fish. Since N. depressa can delay growth and cause infections in fish, these fish are not fit to sell or eat, possibly resulting in economic loss from commercial fish sales. Factors which may induce these parasites on commercial fish are environmental conditions, density of stock, quality of stock, food availability, and more.
