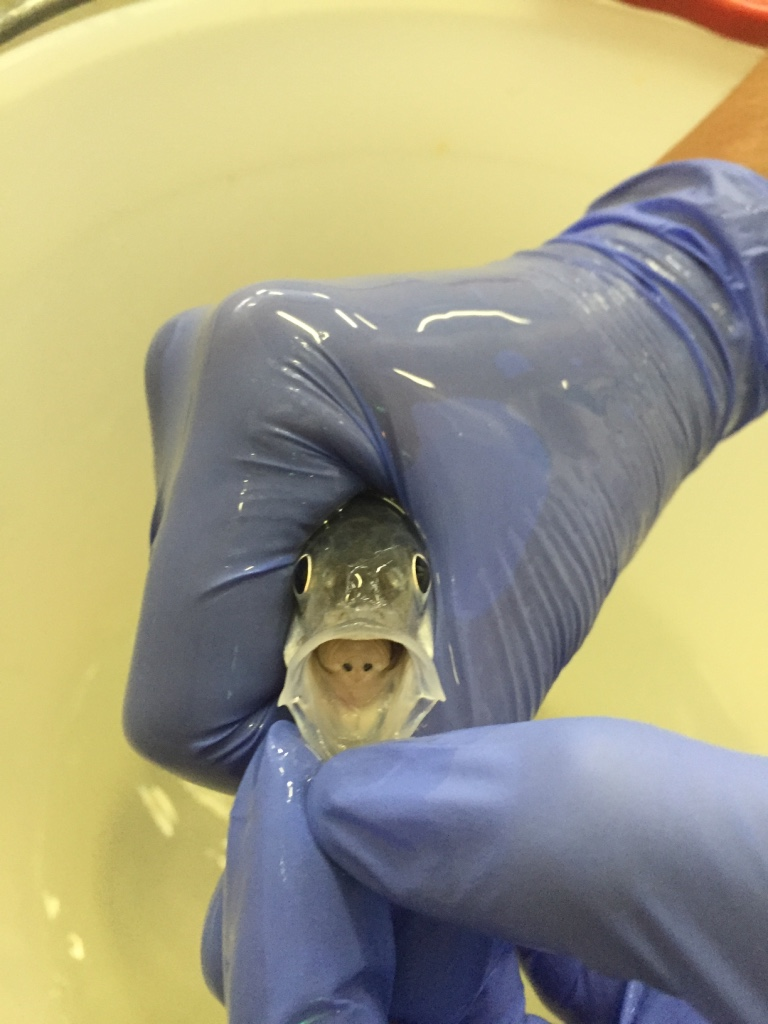
- Adult female settled in the buccal cavity of a juvenile European sea bass (Dicentrarchus labrax).

Scientific classification
- Kingdom: Animalia
- Phylum: Arthropoda
- Class: Malacostraca
- Order: Isopoda
- Family: Cymothoidae
- Genus: Ceratothoa
- Species: C. oestroides

Binomial name
- Ceratothoa oestroides (Risso, 1826)

Synonyms
- Canolira oestroides Risso, 1826; Ceratothoa sargorum Gourret, 1891

= Ceratothoa oestroides =

Parasitic marine isopod

Ceratothoa oestroides is a parasitic isopod of the family Cymothoidae, being one of the "tongue biters" which are obligate ectoparasite of marine fish that dwells in the buccal cavity. It causes various pathologies in fish including tissue damage at the parasitisation site (tongue), growth defects, decrease in mean host weight and size, and increases mortalities in farmed and wild fish populations; fish from five different families are confirmed to host this species: Sparidae (Boops boops, Diplodus annularis, Pagelus erythrinus, Spicara smaris, Sparus aurata), Carangidae (Trachurus mediterraneus), Clupeidae (Sardina pilchardus), Scorpaenidae (Scorpaena notata, Scorpaena porcus), and Mugilidae (Liza aurata).

Mature individuals mate in the host's buccal cavity, and the resultant embryos develop in the female's marsupium, where offspring pass through different pullus stages until they are released from the marsupium as free swimming manca, ready to infest fish hosts. C. oestroides is one of the most devastating ectoparasites in Mediterranean aquaculture, with an unequal distribution along different geographical areas

== Life cycle ==
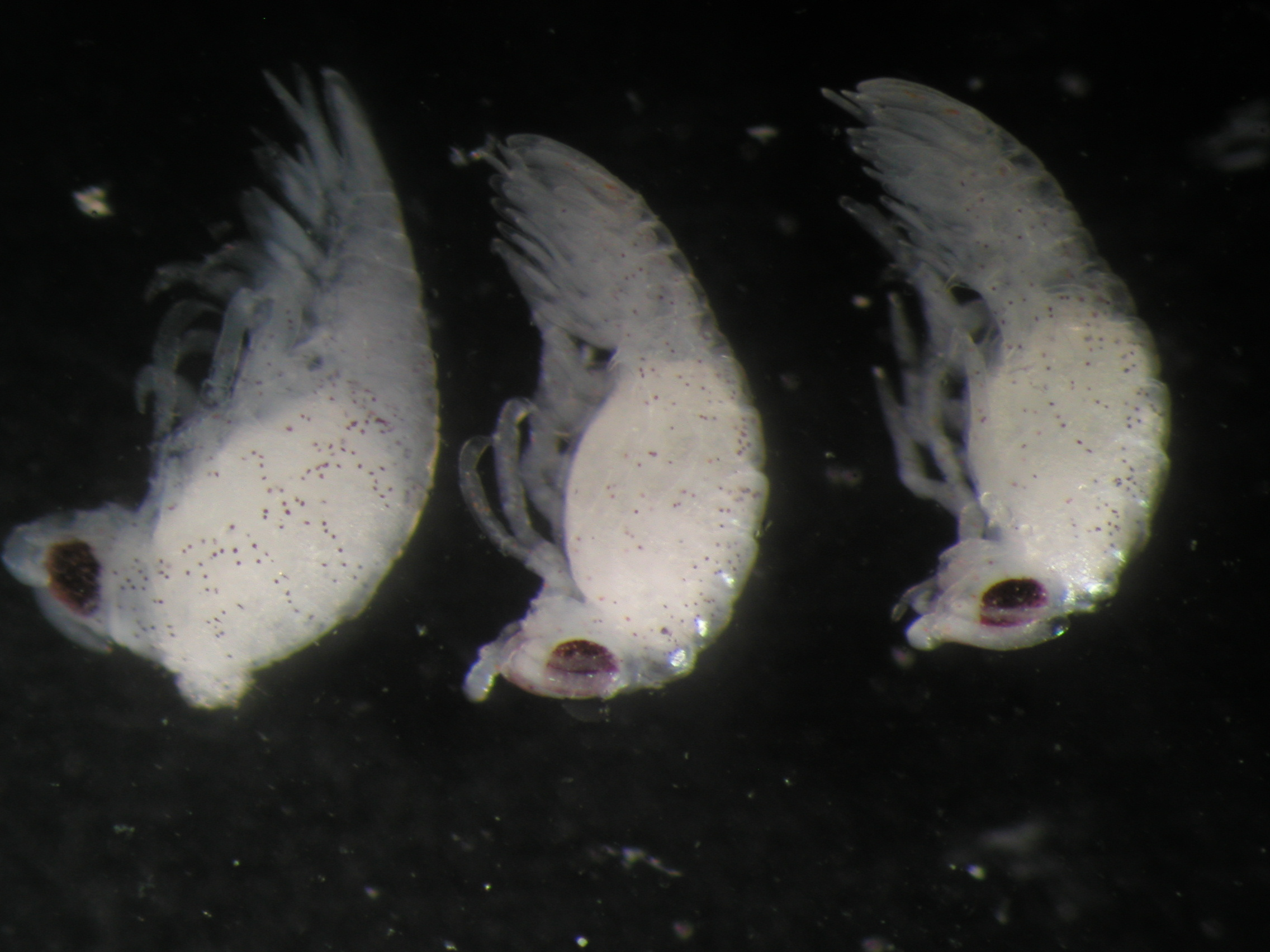
Embryos/pulli extracted from an adult female's marsupium.

In general cymothoids are protandric hermaphrodites: adults mate in the host's buccal cavity, the embryos develop in the female's marsupium, then moult through the pullus stages. The first pullus (I stage) can be found only in the marsupium where it moults into second pullus (II stage). Although most cymothoids have four pullus stages, only pullus stages I and II seem to exist in Ceratothoa oestroides.

Sexual differentiation occurs only after young leave the brood pouch. As free swimming manca (infective stage), the parasite will seek and attach to an appropriate host, initially attaching onto the host's body (flanks, fins), and then crawls towards the operculum, where it enters the buccal cavity and settles on the base of the tongue. Moulting follows, and the isopods lose their swimming setae and becoming sessile. After permanent attachment is completed, another moult follows, where a seventh segment and pair of pereopods appears which is typical for the isopod pre-adult form. C. oestroides in this pre-adult form is functionally male until various conditions induce its transformation to female. After transformation, the isopod is considered to be adult. Individuals that are first to reach the buccal cavity may undergo the full process of sexual differentiation (male puberty, mature male, transitory male stage, female puberty, mature female). Females block the transformation of a second individual parasite within a host. This second individual remains in the mature male stage as long as the female is alive. All the life stages of C. oestroides are found on the fish host, if we also include the pulli that are situated in the female pouch.

== Pathology and clinical signs ==
Head of an adult female

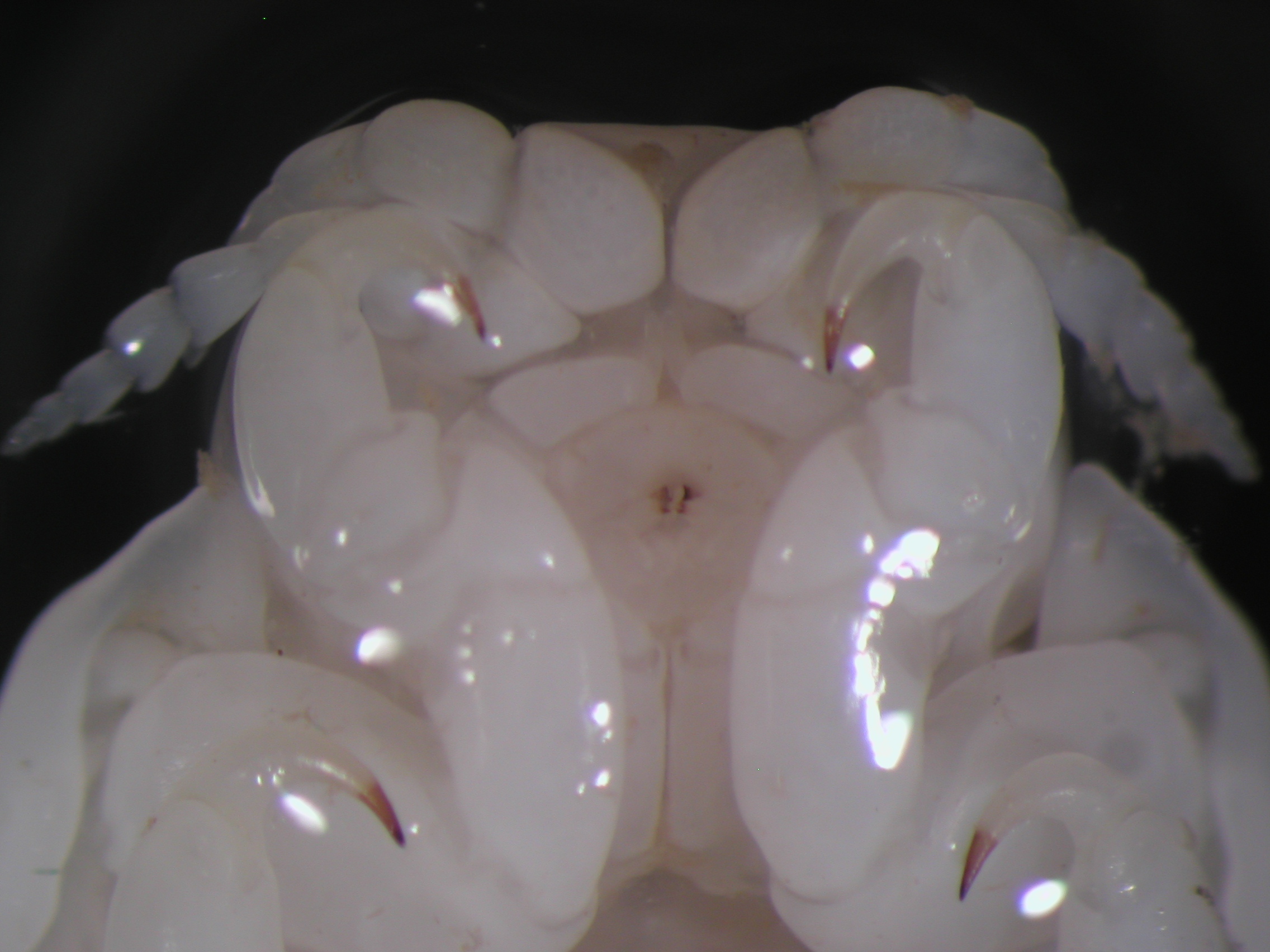
Ventral view

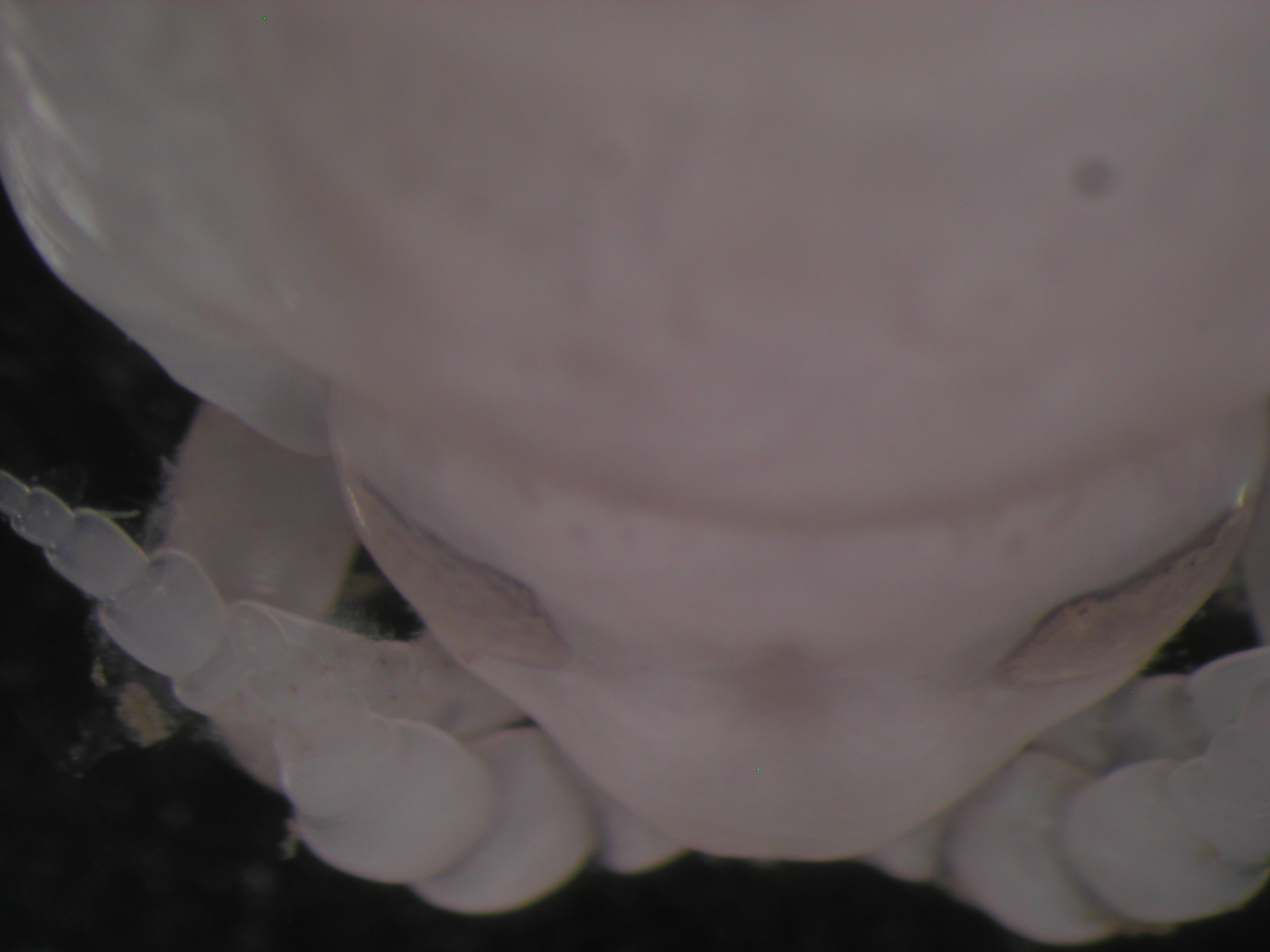
Dorsal view

This parasite causes various pathologies, including tissue damage of the tongue, growth defects, anaemia, decrease in mean host weight and size and increased mortalities in farmed and wild fish populations. It has not been observed to impair feed intake in pre- and harvest-sized fish. Instead, the decrease in fingerlings’ weight is likely attributed to the suspected hematophagous nature of the parasite. Ceratothoa-infected fish may also be infected with Rickettsia-like organisms (RLO), and related the latter pathogen to transmission by the isopod. Apparently, infection of RLO is higher in Ceratothoa-highly infected farms. Vagianou and colleagues observed that larval stages of C. oestroides (pulli II) that attack small fish induce the most damage, causing severe ulcers and extensive granulomatous lesions in the eyes that lead to blindness or the total loss of the eyeball. However, this was not reported in other geographic area where the isopod has been found in reared fish. Fish infected with adult parasites did not show serious pathology. Lesions were localized at the upper and lower jaws and the tongue.

== Relation to humans ==
Growth of farmed fish may be reduced and fish can suffer from post-haemorrhagic anaemia due to infestation. Growth of caged fish infected with the parasite may be reduced up to 80% of market-sized uninfected fish. For example, parasitised sea bass (Dicentrarchus labrax) in the age group of 291–293 days had reduced growth by 20.1% (14 g) and reduced length of 7.1% (12.63 mm) compared to non-parasitised fish.

Diagnosis of C. oestroides infection is performed by examining the buccal cavity and determining the presence of the parasite.

=== Control methods ===
Treatment of isopod infestations on young fish has been performed using hourly formalin baths and manual removing from the buccal cavity during the vaccination for other diseases. Within a fish farm, it is common practice to decrease the number of wild fish population by fish net, as well as periodically cleaning the floating cages nets, depending on the season. Horton and Okamura (2001) suggest grading of smaller and larger fish and their separation, mooring the cages in deeper sites with sufficient currents to disperse the juvenile parasites in a direction away from the cages. Often, in cases of heavy parasitism and mortality, reducing stocking density is enough to remedy the situation.
