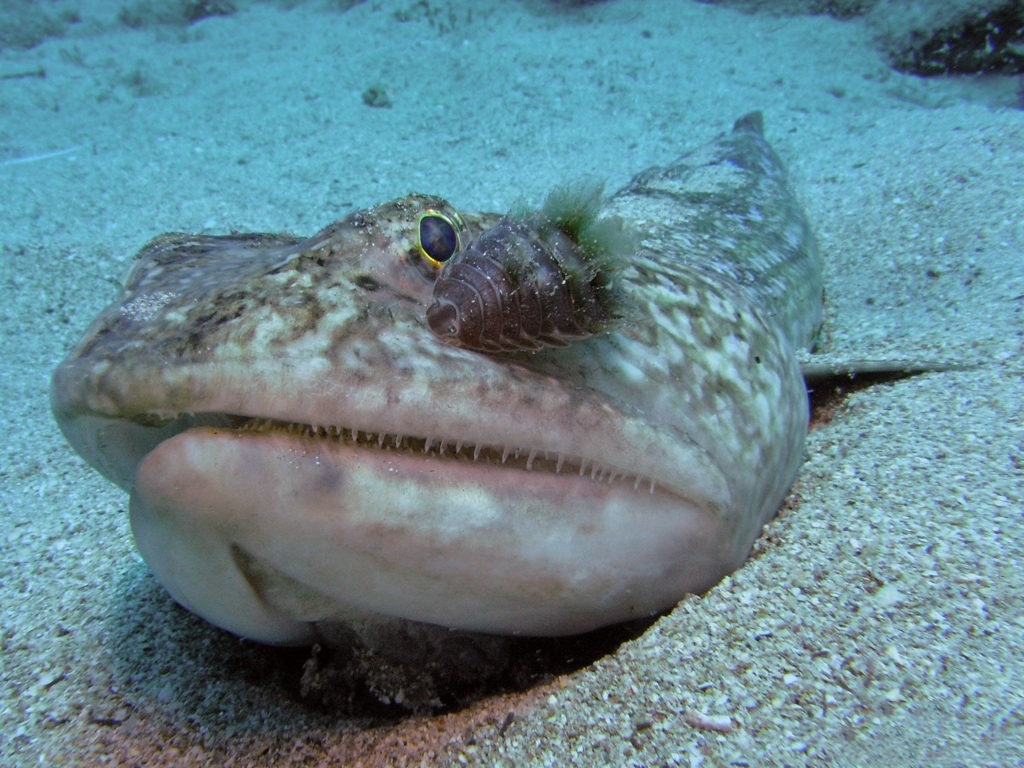
- Nerocila armata on Synodus synodus

Scientific classification
- Kingdom: Animalia
- Phylum: Arthropoda
- Class: Malacostraca
- Order: Isopoda
- Family: Cymothoidae
- Genus: Nerocila; Leach, 1818

Type species
- Nerocila blainvillei Leach, 1818

Species
- 42 species (see text)

= Nerocila =

Genus of crustaceans

Nerocila is a genus of parasitic isopod crustaceans, with 11 species, which have been found parasitizing Indian marine fishes.

== Species ==
The 42 recognized species are:

- Nerocila acuminata Schiödte & Meinert, 1881
- Nerocila armata Dana, 1853
- Nerocila arres Bowman & Tareen, 1983
- Nerocila barramundae Bruce, 1987
- Nerocila benrosei Bunkley-Williams & Williams, 1999
- Nerocila bivittata (Risso, 1816)
- Nerocila blainvillei Leach, 1818
- Nerocila californica Schioedte & Meinert, 1881
- Nerocila congener Miers, 1880
- Nerocila depressa Milne Edwards, 1840
- Nerocila donghaiensis H. Yu & Li, 2002
- Nerocila excisa Searle, 1914
- Nerocila exocoeti Pillai, 1954
- Nerocila falcata (Fabricius, 1787)
- Nerocila falklandica Cunningham, 1871
- Nerocila fluviatilis Schioedte & Meinert, 1881
- Nerocila hemirhamphusi Shyamasundari, Hanumantha Rao & Jalaj Kumari, 1990
- Nerocila heterozota Ahmed, 1970
- Nerocila japonica Schioedte & Meinert, 1881
- Nerocila kisra Bowman & Tareen, 1983
- Nerocila lanceolata (Say, 1818)
- Nerocila laticeps Bovallius, 1887
- Nerocila livida Budde-Lund, 1908
- Nerocila lomatia Bruce, 1987
- Nerocila longispina Miers, 1880
- Nerocila loveni Bovallius, 1887
- Nerocila monodi Hale, 1940
- Nerocila munda Harger, 1873
- Nerocila orbignyi (Guérin-Méneville, 1832)
- Nerocila phaiopleura Bleeker, 1857
- Nerocila philippensis Bovallius, 1887
- Nerocila pigmentata Bal & Joshi, 1959
- Nerocila priacanthusi Jalaja Kumari, Hanumantha Rao & Shyam
- Nerocila pulicatensis Jayadev Babu & Sanjeeva Raj, 1980
- Nerocila recurvispina Schioedte & Meinert, 1881
- Nerocila serra Schioedte & Meinert, 1881
- Nerocila sigani Bowman & Tareen, 1983
- Nerocila sundaica Bleeker, 1857
- Nerocila swainsoni Leach, 1818
- Nerocila tenuipes Dana, 1853
- Nerocila trichiura (Miers, 1878)
- Nerocila trivittata Bleeker, 1857
