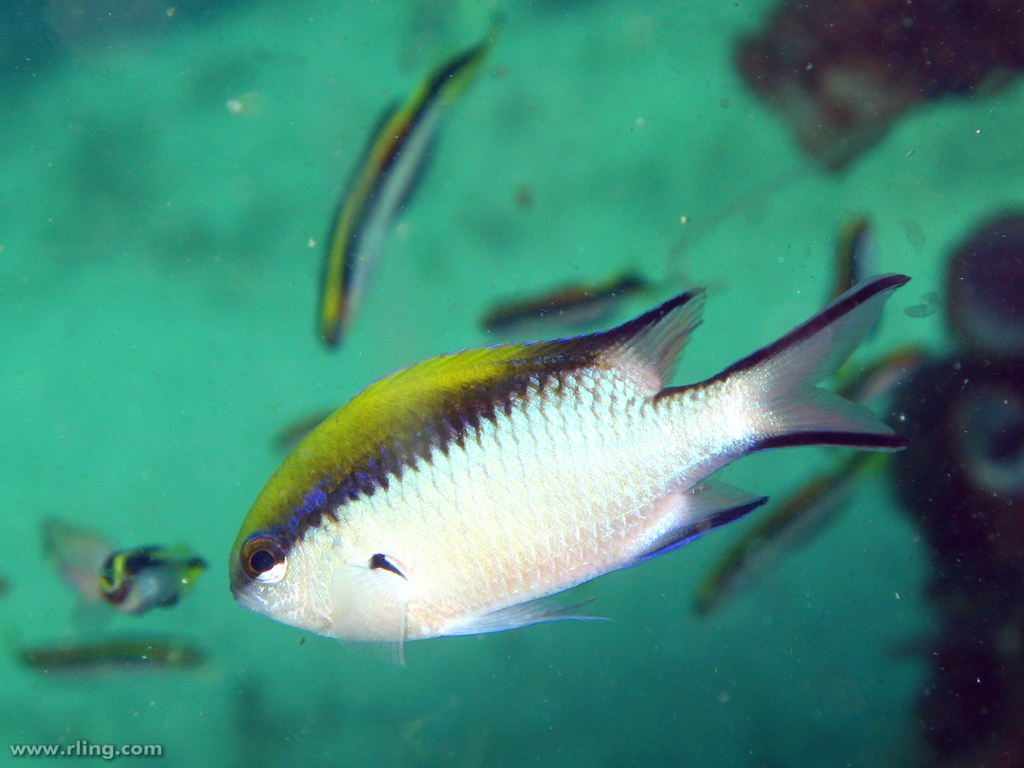

Conservation status
- Least Concern (IUCN 3.1)

Scientific classification
- Kingdom: Animalia
- Phylum: Chordata
- Class: Actinopterygii
- Order: Blenniiformes
- Family: Pomacentridae
- Genus: Chromis
- Species: C. nitida

Binomial name
- Chromis nitida (Whitley, 1928)

Synonyms
- Tetradrachmum nitidum Whitley, 1928

= Chromis nitida =

Species of fish

The Barrier Reef chromis (Chromis nitida), also known as the yellowback puller or shining puller, is a species of damselfish in the family Pomacentridae native to the east coast of Australia. It is a small fish with a yellowish-brown dorsal surface separated by a dark stripe from its silvery flanks and underside.

== Description ==
The yellowback puller grows to a maximum length of about 9 cm (3.5 in). The single dorsal fin has thirteen spines and eleven to thirteen soft rays and the anal fin has two spines and ten or eleven soft rays. This fish has a dark diagonal line running from the eye to the posterior end of the dorsal fin. Above this line it is yellowish-brown and below it is silvery. The upper and lower edges of the deeply forked tail fin are black.

== Distribution and habitat ==
The yellowback puller is native to the subtropical east coast of Australia. Its range extends from northern Queensland to southern New South Wales and includes Lord Howe Island. It is found at depths between 5 and 25 m (16 and 82 ft) on the outer side of coral-rich rocky reefs and in estuaries. Young fish sometimes inhabit lagoons, as do some adults.

== Biology ==
The yellowback puller is a shoaling species and often found in association with the black-axil chromis (Chromis atripectoralis). It feeds on algae, zooplankton and small invertebrates. It forms pairs in the breeding season. The eggs are adhesive and stick to the seabed where the male guards them and keeps them aerated. The yellowback puller is sometimes parasitised by the isopod crustacean Anilocra pomacentri. The size of the parasite and the fish seems to be correlated indicating that the manca (juvenile isopod) attaches at an early stage in the life of the fish and that both grow simultaneously.

== In the aquarium ==
The yellowback puller is suitable to be kept in a reef aquarium where it can be fed on brine shrimps and mysid shrimps. Being a shoaling fish, it should be kept in a small group, and being non-aggressive, it mixes well with other species of fish.
