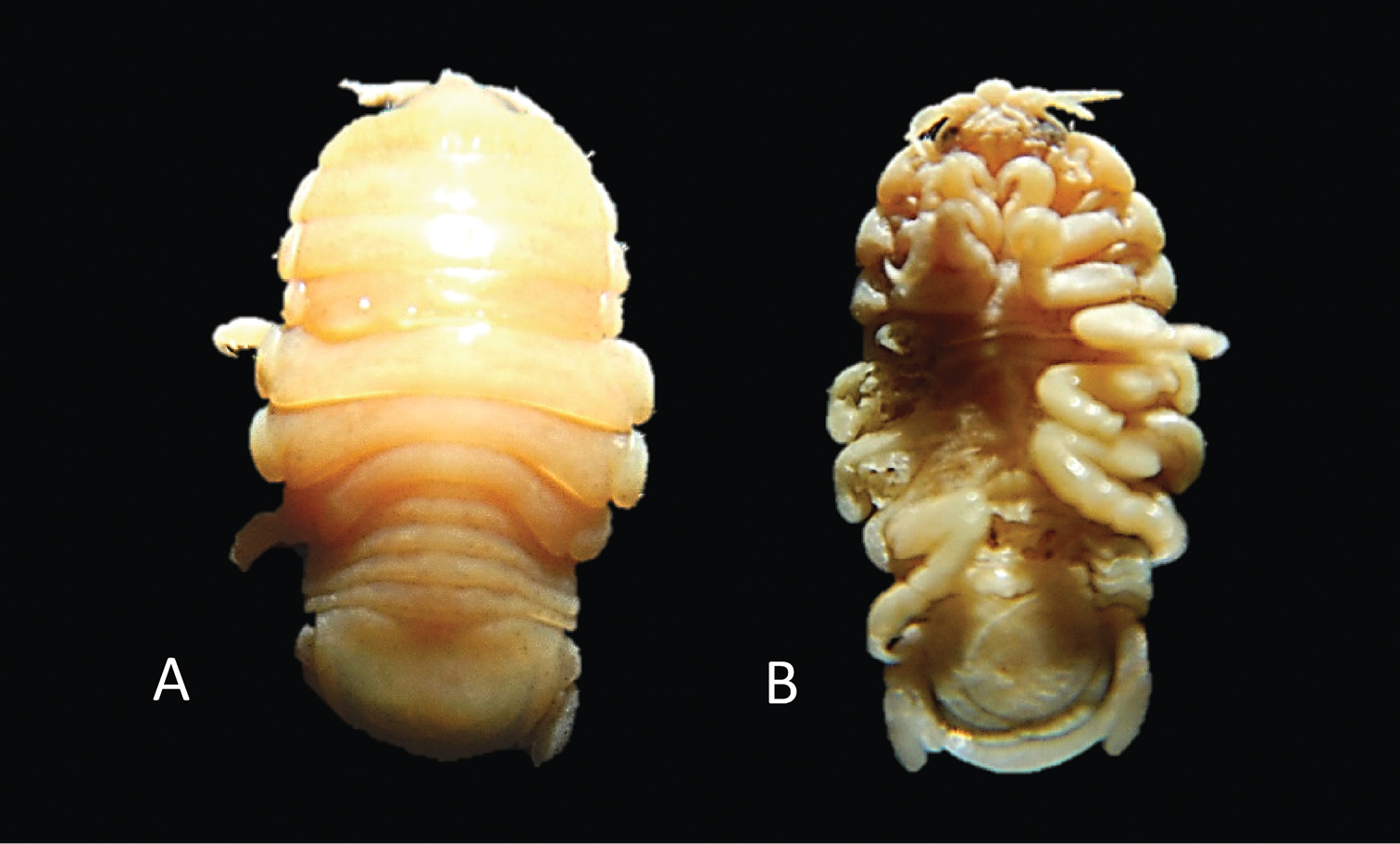
- Elthusa xena

Scientific classification
- Kingdom: Animalia
- Phylum: Arthropoda
- Class: Malacostraca
- Order: Isopoda
- Family: Cymothoidae
- Genus: Elthusa; Schioedte & Meinert, 1884

= Elthusa =

Genus of crustaceans

Elthusa is a genus of isopods in the family Cymothoidae, with 40 described species.

== Species ==
The following species are recognised in the genus Elthusa:

- Elthusa acutinasa Van der Wal, Smit & Hadfield, 2019
- Elthusa alvaradoensis Rocha-Ramírez, Chávez-López & Bruce, 2005
- Elthusa arnoglossi Trilles & Justine, 2006
- Elthusa atlantniroi (Kononenko, 1988)
- Elthusa californica (Schioedte & Meinert, 1884)
- Elthusa caudata (Schioedte & Meinert, 1884)
- Elthusa emarginata (Bleeker, 1857)
- Elthusa epimerias (Richardson, 1909)
- Elthusa epinepheli Trilles & Justine, 2010
- Elthusa fistularia Aneesh, Helna, Kumar & Trilles, 2020
- Elthusa foveolata (Hansen, 1897)
- Elthusa frontalis (Richardson, 1910)
- Elthusa menziesi (Brusca, 1981)
- Elthusa methepia (Schioedte & Meinert, 1884)
- Elthusa moritakii Saito & Yamauchi, 2016
- Elthusa myripristae Bruce, 1990
- Elthusa nanoides (Stebbing, 1905)
- Elthusa neocytta (Avdeev, 1975)
- Elthusa nierstraszi Hadfield, Bruce & Smit, 2016
- Elthusa ochotensis (Kussakin, 1979)
- Elthusa parabothi Trilles & Justine, 2004
- Elthusa parva (Richardson, 1910)
- Elthusa philippinensis (Richardson, 1910)
- Elthusa poutassouiensis (Penso, 1939)
- Elthusa propinqua (Richardson, 1904)
- Elthusa pseudorhombus Aneesh, Helna, Kumar & Trilles, 2020
- Elthusa raynaudii (H. Milne Edwards, 1840)
- Elthusa rotunda Van der Wal, Smit & Hadfield, 2019
- Elthusa sacciger (Richardson, 1909)
- Elthusa samariscii (Shiino, 1951)
- Elthusa samoensis (Schioedte & Meinert, 1884)
- Elthusa sigani Bruce, 1990
- Elthusa sinuata (Koelbel, 1879)
- Elthusa splendida (Sadowsky & Moreira, 1981)
- Elthusa tropicalis (Menzies & Kruczynski, 1983)
- Elthusa turgidula (Hale, 1926)
- Elthusa uranoscopus Aneesh, Helna, Kumar & Trilles, 2020
- Elthusa vulgaris (Stimpson, 1857)
- Elthusa winstoni Hadfield, Tuttle & Smit, 2017
- Elthusa xena Van der Wal, Smit & Hadfield, 2019
