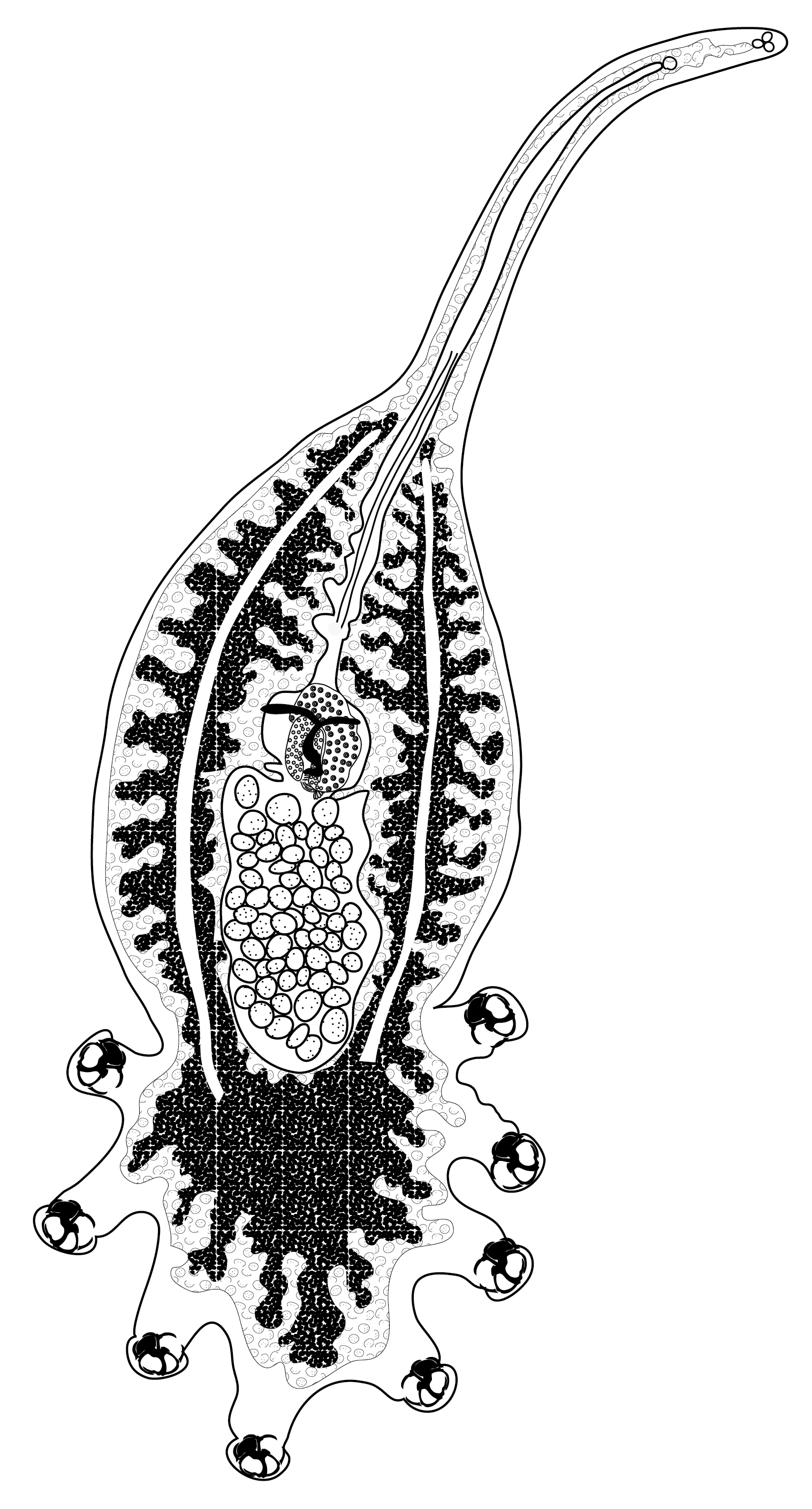

Scientific classification
- Kingdom: Animalia
- Phylum: Platyhelminthes
- Class: Monogenea
- Order: Mazocraeidea
- Family: Diclidophoridae
- Genus: Cyclocotyla; Otto, 1821
- Species: C. bellones

Binomial name
- Cyclocotyla bellones Otto, 1823

Synonyms
- Species synonymy: Cyclocotula Mudie, 1840; Cyclocotyle Burmeister, 1837; Species synonymy: Diclidophora bellones (Otto, 1823)

= Cyclocotyla bellones =

Species of platyhelminthe

Cyclocotyla is a genus of monogenean flatworms first described in 1821. It currently consists of one valid species, Cyclocotyla bellones, with all other former members reassigned to other genera. However, some consider that the genus is currently a taxon inquirendum.

The sole species C. bellones is notorious for being a hyperparasite. It dwells on the isopod parasite Ceratothoa parallela (among others of the same genus), which itself feeds on the fish Boops boops and Pagellus acarne.

However, in a 2022 study, it was found that the species was not truly an hyperparasite, since it did not feed on the crustacean but rather on the fish. The authors concluded "Cyclocotyla bellones is thus both an epibiont on the crustacean and a parasite of the fish. It could be considered a hyperparasite only in terms of location (it dwells on a parasite), but not in terms of nutrition (it does not feed on a parasite but on a host which is not a parasite)."
