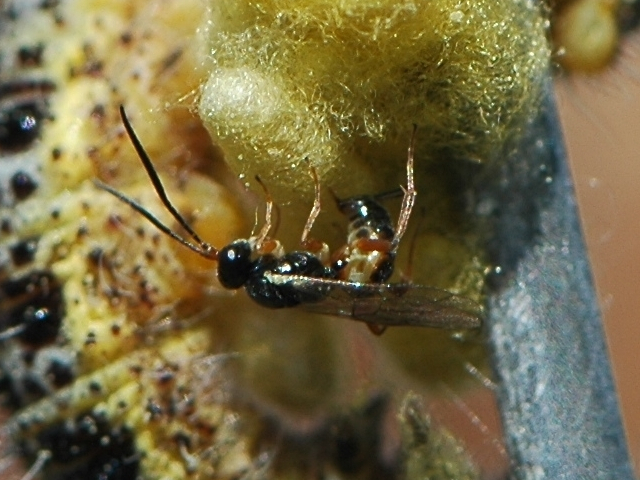

Scientific classification
- Kingdom: Animalia
- Phylum: Arthropoda
- Class: Insecta
- Order: Hymenoptera
- Family: Ichneumonidae
- Genus: Lysibia
- Species: L. nana

Binomial name
- Lysibia nana (Gravenhorst, 1829)

= Lysibia nana =

Species of wasp

Lysibia nana is a hyperparasitoid wasp that attacks the parasitoid wasp Cotesia glomerata.

Lysibia nana reproduces sexually and only infects hosts in the family Braconidae. Adult females of this species do not feed from their host, but rather rely on sources of nectar in their environment. L. nana females find hosts by detecting chemical signals, such as kairomones (usually intra-specific pheromones of the host) or herbivore-induced plant volatiles (HIPVs) that are released by plants when they are attacked by herbivores. Females are attracted to plants that have been attacked by caterpillars infected by C. glomerata. Once a suitable host has been found, the L. nana female lays an egg in a C. glomerata larva.
