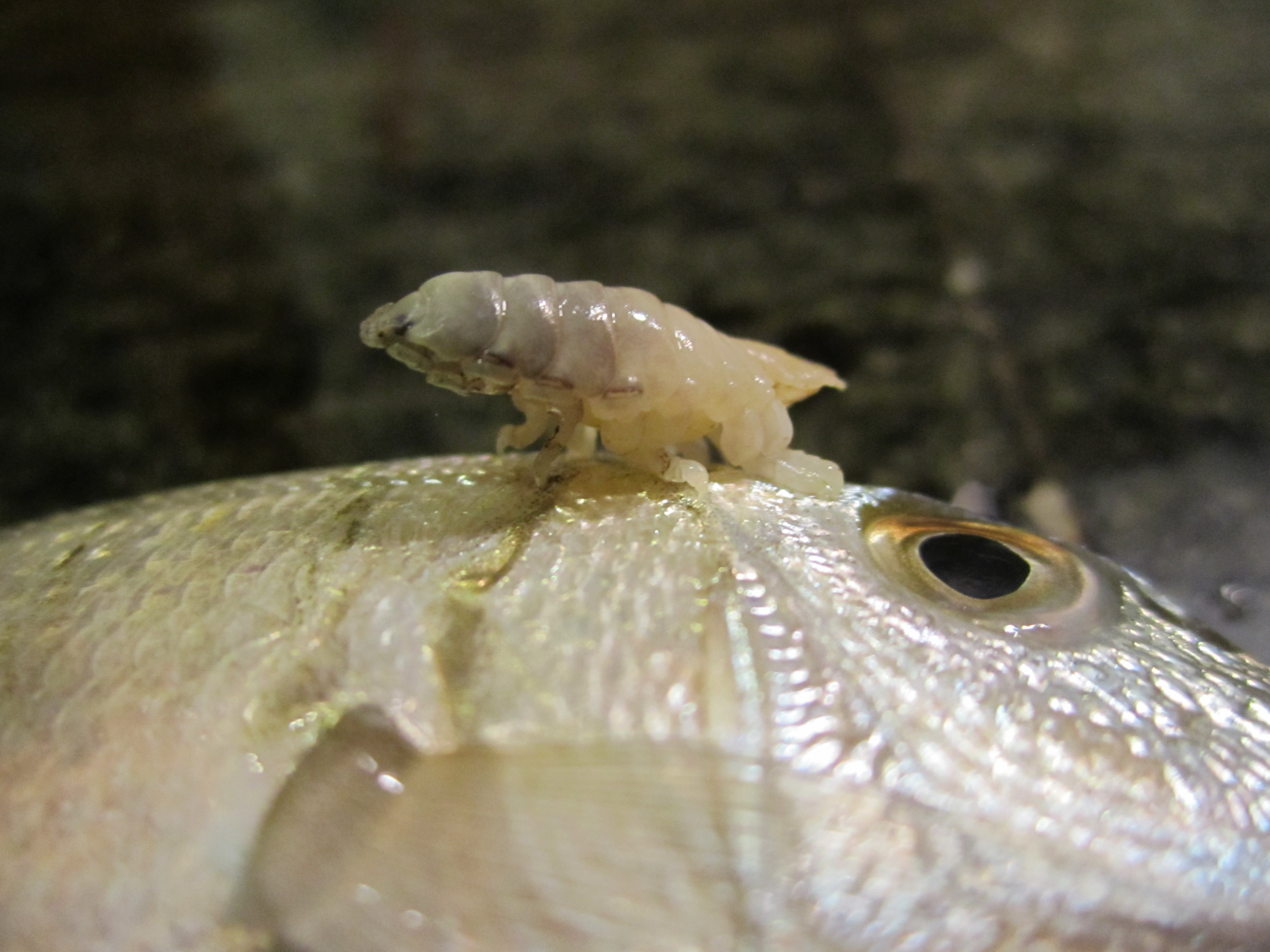
- Cymothoa exigua

Scientific classification
- Kingdom: Animalia
- Phylum: Arthropoda
- Class: Malacostraca
- Order: Isopoda
- Family: Cymothoidae
- Genus: Cymothoa; Fabricius, 1787

= Cymothoa =

Genus of crustaceans

Cymothoa is a genus of parasitic isopod crustaceans, containing the species listed below. Not all Cymothoa species are considered parasitic. Some climb onto fish in an act known as phoresy.

- Cymothoa asymmetrica Pillai, 1954
- Cymothoa borbonica Schiödte & Meinert, 1884
- Cymothoa brasiliensis Schiödte & Meinert, 1884
- Cymothoa bychowskyi Avdeev, 1979
- Cymothoa carangii Avdeev, 1979
- Cymothoa carryensis Gourret, 1892
- Cymothoa catarinensis Thatcher, Loyola e Silva, Jost & Souza-Conceiçao, 2003
- Cymothoa cinerea Bal & Joshi, 1959
- Cymothoa curta Schiödte & Meinert, 1884
- Cymothoa dufresni Leach, 1818
- Cymothoa elegans Bovallius, 1885
- Cymothoa epimerica Avdeev, 1979
- Cymothoa eremita (Brunnich, 1783)
- Cymothoa excisa Perty, 1833
- Cymothoa exigua Schiödte & Meinert, 1884
- Cymothoa eximia Schiödte & Meinert, 1884
- Cymothoa frontalis H. Milne-Edwards, 1840
- Cymothoa gadorum Brocchi, 1875
- Cymothoa gerris Schiödte & Meinert, 1884
- Cymothoa gibbosa Gourret, 1892
- Cymothoa globosa Schiödte & Meinert, 1884
- Cymothoa guadeloupensis Fabricius, 1793
- Cymothoa hermani Hadfield, Bruce & Smit, 2011
- Cymothoa ianuarii Schiödte & Meinert, 1884
- Cymothoa ichtiola (Brünnich, 1764)
- Cymothoa indica Schiödte & Meinert, 1884
- Cymothoa liannae Sartor & Pires, 1988
- Cymothoa limbata Schiödte & Meinert, 1884
- Cymothoa marginata Bleeker, 1857
- Cymothoa nigropunctata Risso, 1816
- Cymothoa oestrum (Linnaeus, 1758)
- Cymothoa paradoxa Haller, 1880
- Cymothoa parupenei Avdeev, 1979
- Cymothoa plebeia Schiödte & Meinert, 1884
- Cymothoa propria Avdeev, 1979
- Cymothoa pulchrum Lanchester, 1902
- Cymothoa recifea Thatcher & Fonseca, 2005
- Cymothoa recta Dana, 1853
- Cymothoa rhina Schiödte & Meinert, 1884
- Cymothoa rotunda Avdeev, 1979
- Cymothoa rotundifrons Haller, 1880
- Cymothoa scopulorum (Linnaeus, 1758)
- Cymothoa selari Avdeev, 1978
- Cymothoa slusarskii Rokicki, 1986
- Cymothoa spinipalpa Thatcher, de Arujo, de Lima & Chellapa, 2007
- Cymothoa truncata Schiödte & Meinert, 1884
- Cymothoa vicina Hale, 1926
