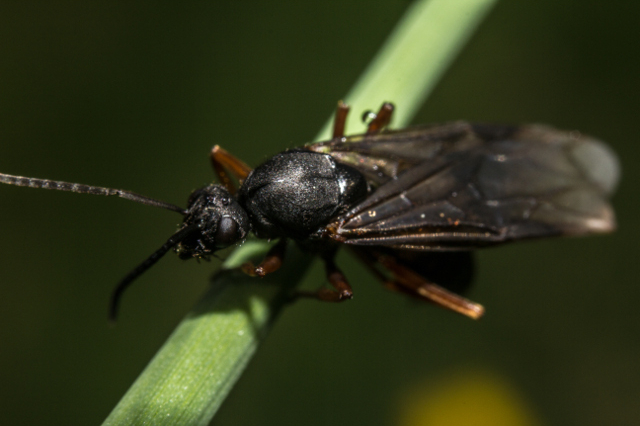
- Imago
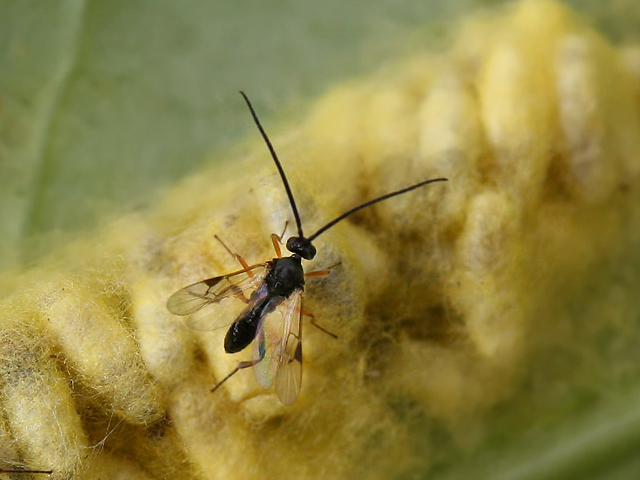
- Cotesia glomerata on a pupal cocoon.

Scientific classification
- Kingdom: Animalia
- Phylum: Arthropoda
- Class: Insecta
- Order: Hymenoptera
- Family: Braconidae
- Genus: Cotesia
- Species: C. glomerata

Binomial name
- Cotesia glomerata (Linnaeus, 1758)

Synonyms
- Apanteles glomeratus

= Cotesia glomerata =

Species of wasp

Cotesia glomerata, the white butterfly parasite, is a small parasitoid wasp belonging to family Braconidae. It was described by Carl Linnaeus in his 1758 publication 10th edition of Systema Naturae.

== Description ==
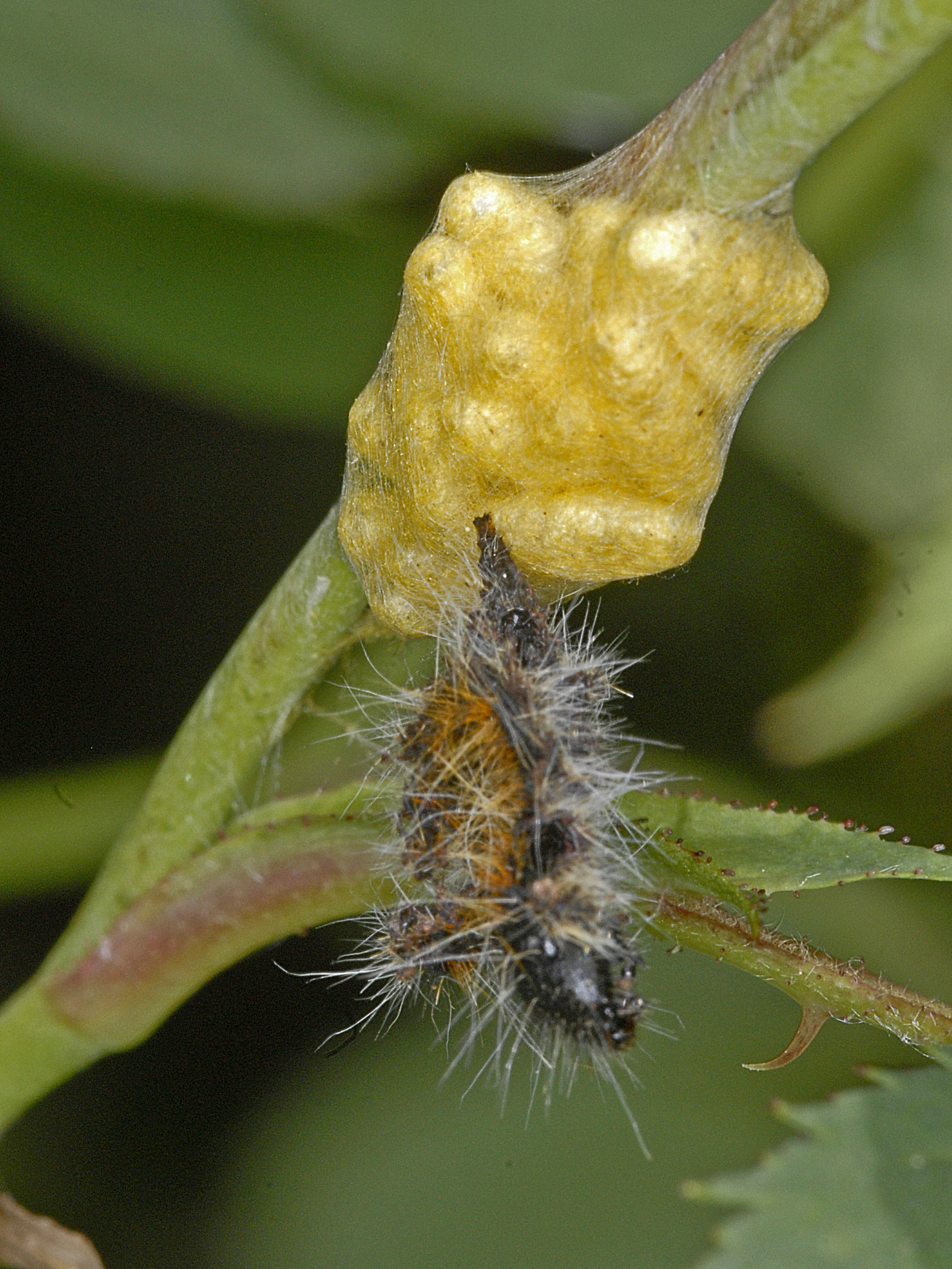
Cocoons of Cotesia species with the remains of a dead parasitized caterpillar

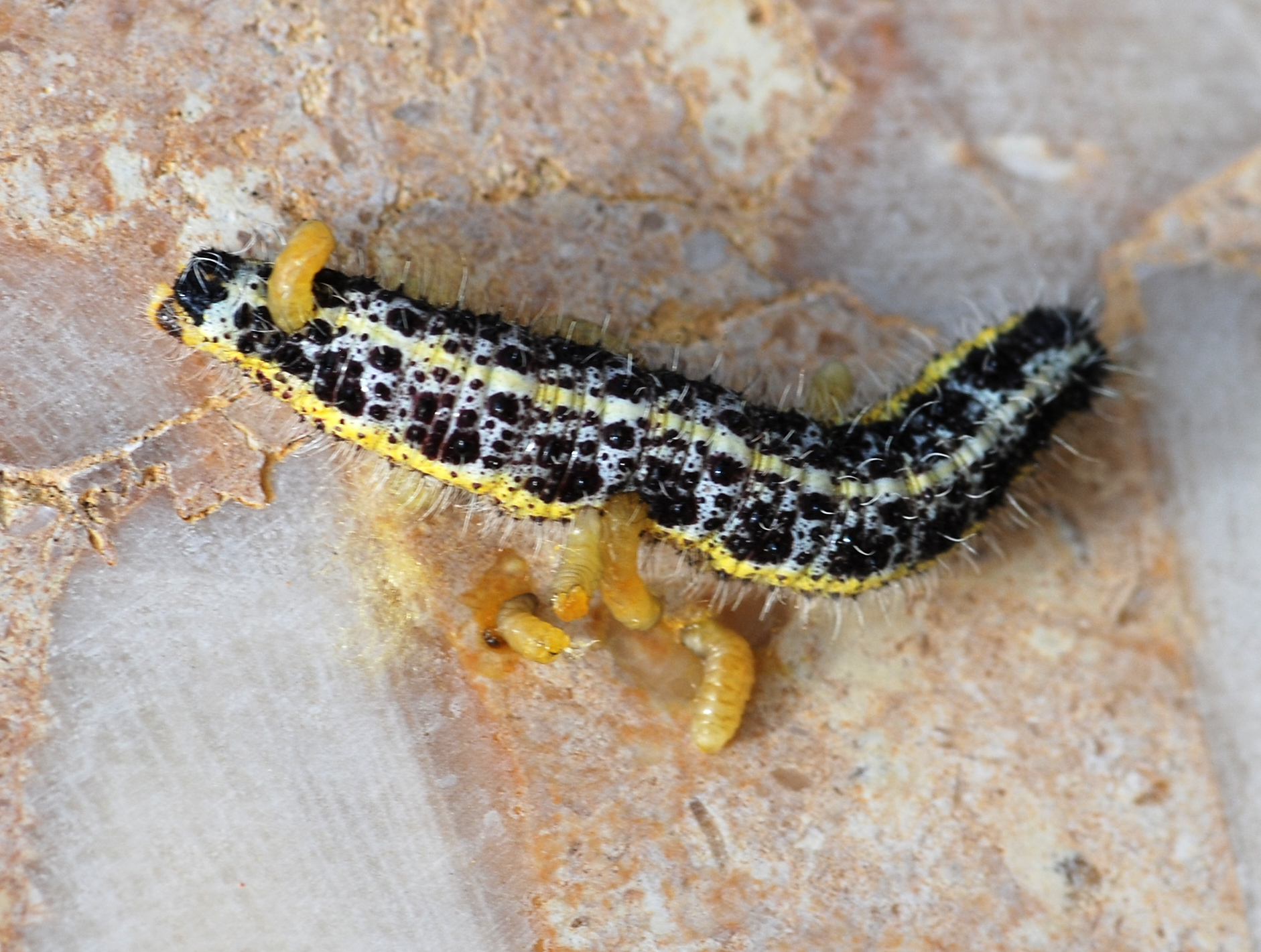
Larvae of Cotesia glomerata emerging from a caterpillar of a Pieris brassicae butterfly

The adults of Cotesia glomerata can reach a length of 3–7 millimetres (0.12–0.28 in). This small braconid wasp is black, with two pairs of wings. It can parasitize a wide range of Pieris butterfly species as host, but the large white (Pieris brassicae) and small white (Pieris rapae) are the main hosts. The adults feed on nectar.

== Life cycle ==
After hatching from the pupae, females mate almost immediately and begin laying eggs. The eggs are laid in the larvae of butterflies known as caterpillars, where the C. glomerata larvae develop; multiple eggs numbering between 16–52 are deposited in each caterpillar. After 15 to 20 days the larvae emerge, usually killing the parasitised caterpillar. These newly emerged larvae spin cocoons in a cluster on or nearby the host caterpillar; after 7 to 10 days the imago adult wasps hatch from these cocoons. Males typically emerge before females and disperse from the area. Overall, it takes between 22 and 30 days for an egg to develop to full adulthood.

Cotesia glomerata is in turn parasitized by the hyperparasite wasps Lysibia nana and Gelis agilis.

== Distribution ==
This species is present in most of Europe, in the Afrotropical realm, the Australasian realm, the Nearctic realm, and the Neotropical realm.
