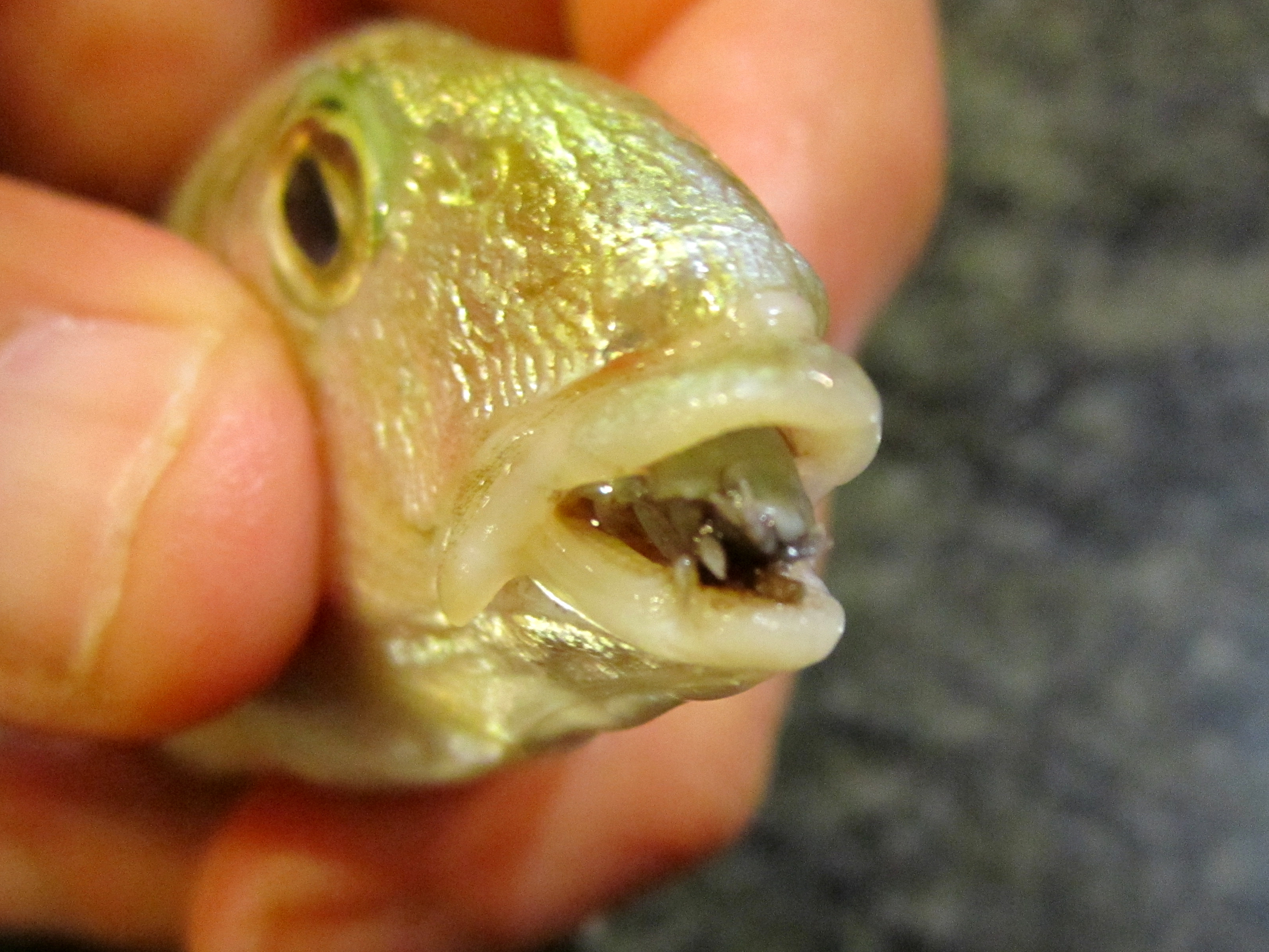

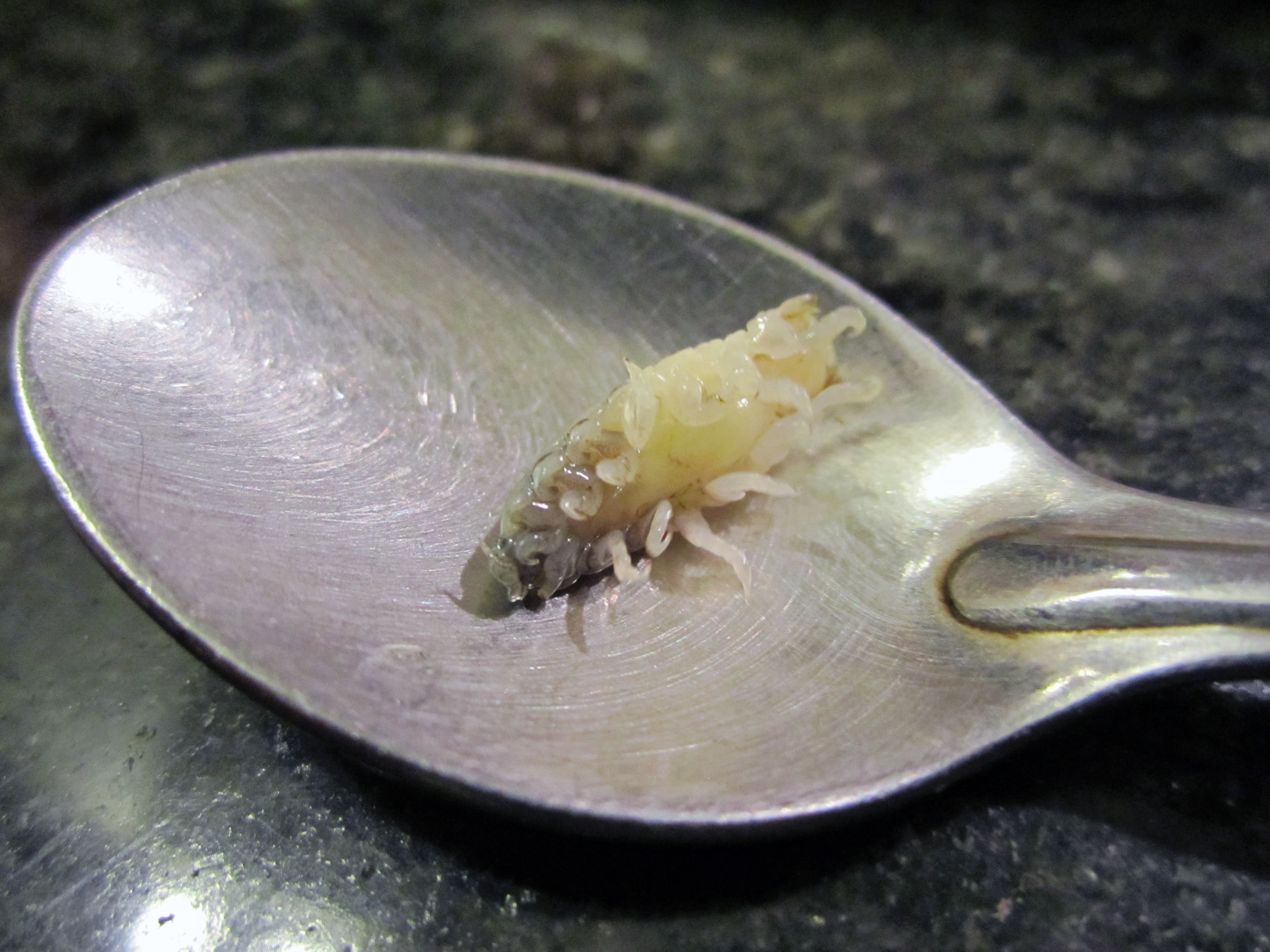

Scientific classification
- Kingdom: Animalia
- Phylum: Arthropoda
- Clade: Pancrustacea
- Class: Malacostraca
- Order: Isopoda
- Family: Cymothoidae
- Genus: Cymothoa
- Species: C. exigua

Binomial name
- Cymothoa exigua (Schiødte & Meinert, 1884)

= Cymothoa exigua =

Species of parasitic marine isopod

Cymothoa exigua, also commonly known as the tongue-eating louse, is a parasitic isopod of the family Cymothoidae. As an ectoparasite, it lives on the outside of the host, and is found throughout the Atlantic and Pacific Oceans. Adults grow up to an inch in length and are among the largest isopods recorded. C. exigua are hermaphrodites, and are all born as a male before switching to female later in life. As such, female C. exigua are generally larger than males.

Many species of Cymothoa have been identified, and only Cymothoidae isopods are known to consume and replace the host's organs. Other species of isopods known to parasitize fish in this way include Cymothoa borbonica and Ceratothoa imbricata. Cymothoids are adapted to specific areas of attachment on the host, including scale-clingers, mouth- or gill-dwellers, and flesh-burrowers.

Cymothoa exigua attaches itself to a host as a juvenile, entering through a fish’s gills. It will crawl into the fish's mouth and clamp down onto its tongue. C. exigua severs all the blood vessels and causes necrosis. When the tongue eventually falls off, C. exigua takes its place.

== Taxonomy and systematics ==
Cymothoa exigua were discovered in the 1700s, and first named by Linnaeus, but have gained much more popularity in recent times. This is due to Brusca and Gilligan's description of C. exigua as a tongue-replacing isopod from the eastern Pacific.

The Cymothoidae is a large family, having 383 species. They are all parasites that are found on many different kinds of host fish worldwide. Cymothoids are also site specific on their host, and different species are usually found in a particular area, such as near the gills, the mouth, the eyes, the caudal fins, or are even sometimes buried inside of the flesh.

There are eight genera of cymothoid that attach to their host's mouth, with approximately 100 species found worldwide. However, much of the taxonomy, biology, host specificity and distribution of the mouth-attaching cymothoid are still unclear.

== Description ==
Cymothoa exigua has a similar build to other isopods. It has a flattened and segmented body with seven pairs of legs. Since all C. exigua are protandrous hermaphrodite, females are typically larger and older than the males. This sexual dimorphism is typical of many parasitic isopods. C. exigua has sharp legs to secure itself tightly to its host’s tongue. Females are generally 8–29 mm (0.3–1.1 in) long and 4–14 mm (0.16–0.55 in) wide. Males are generally around about 7.5–15 mm (0.3–0.6 in) long and 3–7 mm (0.12–0.28 in) wide.

== Behaviour ==
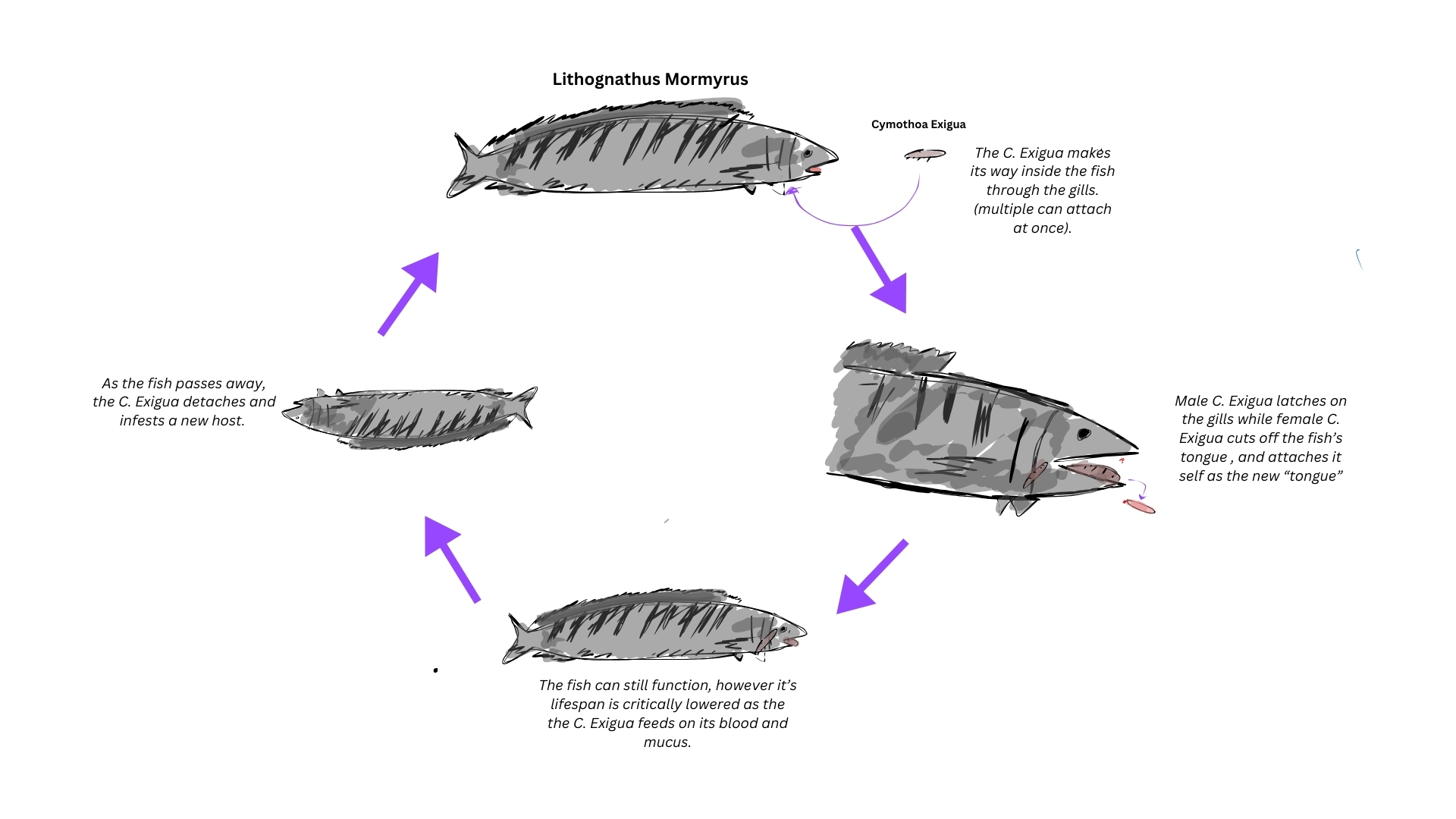
Life cycle of a Lithognathus mormyrus with Cymothoa exigua

While in its mobile juvenile phase, Cymothoa exigua enters a host fish's gills to its mouth. Using its front claws, C. exigua severs the blood vessels in the host's tongue, causing the tongue to necrose from lack of blood. C. exigua then replaces the host tongue by attaching its body to the tissue of the tongue stub. While infestation apparently does not cause much other damage to the host fish, Lanzing and O'Connor reported that infested fish with two or more of the parasites are usually underweight, likely due to the eating difficulties. While some have argued that the isopod simply acts as a functional replacement for the fish’s tongue, many studies have shown that there are actually quite a few negative effects of the parasitic infestations on their hosts. Along with being underweight, the hosts may have tissue damage and growth issues as well.

After Cymothoa exigua has completely replaced the host's tongue, some feed on the host's blood and mucus. The host is also able to use C. exigua like a prosthetic organ. C. exigua can live up to three years and will grow with its host. In the event of host death, C. exigua will detach from the tongue stub and abandon the host's oral cavity. Post host death behavior in the wild has not been studied and remains unknown. However, survival without a host seems unlikely. There are also many examples of fishes that do outlive their isopod parasites. These parasites occupy multiple species of fish, including menhaden, snapper, and other commonly caught species. Out of all the Cymothoa species, C. exigua is the only species to completely consume and take over a fish's tongue.

== Biology ==
=== Life cycle ===
Cymothoa exigua have a short free-living juvenile phase before moving onto their “stationary” adult parasitic phase. All C. exigua will enter a host's gills as a male, as they are protandric hermaphrodite. Males must be at least 0.4 inches to develop into a female. The first C. exigua that enters a host will attach to the gills using its front claws and feed on the host's blood. If another male C. exigua infests the same host, the first male develops into a female. The cause of this sex change is unclear. The first female C. exigua may release pheromones to prevent the later males from changing, as only females will take over the fish’s buccal cavity and become a tongue replacement.

There is much uncertainty surrounding the life span of the Cymothoa exigua. Some consider they produce only one brood, though this can contain more than 400 eggs, which they carry in a ventral brooding pouch, just like all isopods. Based on the different size ranges across Cymothoa specimens, it’s believed that they potentially have several broods and can survive up to three years.

=== Evolutionary significance ===
The evolutionary history of Cymothoa exigua and its niche act as a model for the coevolution of parasites and their hosts. Distinctly, its tongue replacement behavior serves a dual purpose of both sustenance and protection. Since C. exigua replaces its host's tongue, it gains easy access to a ready supply of blood. Further, C. exigua benefits from the protection provided by its host, as it is able to avoid potential predators in a relatively secure environment. Cymothoa exigua play an important role in the functioning of ecosystems, controlling the abundance and stability of the host population. However, their impact on fish and their environment is still being actively studied.

== Distribution ==
Cymothoa exigua is native to the coastal waters of the eastern Pacific Ocean, specifically off the coasts of California and Mexico. It has also been found in the Gulf of Guayaquil, Ecuador, as well as in parts of the Atlantic. C. exigua prefer to inhabit shallow seas, where there is an abundance of potential hosts. It is found in waters 2m (6 ft 7 in) to 60 m (200 ft) deep. C. exigua often parasitizes the Lutjanidae family, more commonly known as snappers. However, C. exigua is also known to parasitize eight species across two orders and four families of fish—seven species of order Perciformes: three snappers, one species of grunt, three drums, and one species of silverside: one grunion. New hosts from Costa Rica include the Colorado snapper and Jordan's snapper.

In 2005, a red snapper parasitized by what could be C. exigua was discovered in the United Kingdom. As the parasite is normally found south of the Gulf of California, Mexico, this led to speculation that the parasite's range may be expanding; however, the isopod probably traveled from the Gulf of California in the snapper's mouth after it was caught and imported to the UK, and its appearance in the UK was an isolated incident.

== Reproduction ==
Not much is known about the life cycle of Cymothoa exigua. They sexually reproduce via protandry. Members of the species start as male juveniles in a short, free-living stage in the water column. Juveniles attach to the gills of a host and, if it is already infested, will induce the initial male to develop into a female. This sex change is caused by the presence of another male, where males can turn into a female after growing to 10 mm (0.4 in) in length. Once the female has fully developed, the female will lay eggs, which the male fertilizes. The fertilized eggs are held in a protected marsupium, akin to a pouch. Once these eggs hatch into larvae, they are immediately solitary and self-sufficient, setting off to locate their own hosts.

== Influence on humans ==
Parasitic isopods like the Cymothoa exigua are not harmful to humans, though they may bite if separated from its host or handled.

It is commonly found in snappers from the Eastern Pacific, which are shipped worldwide for commercial consumption. Because of this, in Puerto Rico, C. exigua was the leading subject of a lawsuit against a large supermarket chain. The customer in the lawsuit claimed to have been poisoned by eating an isopod cooked inside a snapper. The case, however, was dropped on the grounds that isopods are not poisonous to humans and some are even consumed as part of a regular diet. That being said, the isopod can affect a fish’s health. So overall, it could cause some economic impacts as it is found on commercially used fishes like snapper and salmon. A fish's value may also go down due to this parasitic isopod as it looks unsightly.
