= Rhinotrichella globulifera =

Scientific classification
- Kingdom: Fungi
- Division: Ascomycota
- Class: incertae sedis
- Order: incertae sedis
- Family: incertae sedis
- Genus: Rhinotrichella
- Species: R. globulifera

Binomial name
- Rhinotrichella globulifera G. Arnaud ex de Hoog, 1977

Fungicolous species of ascomycete fungus

Rhinotrichella globulifera is a fungicolous ascomycete fungus known primarily from its asexual state. It has most often been recorded growing on the fruiting bodies of other fungi, particularly polypores, although it has also been found on plant remains.

The species produces long erect conidiophores bearing approximately spherical, pale ochre conidia. Records compiled in 2011 indicated its presence in Europe, Asia and North America. In 2026, molecular data from R. globulifera were used in the description and comparison of a second species, Rhinotrichella carpini.

== Name and classification ==
G. Arnaud used the name Rhinotrichella globulifera before it was validly published. G. S. de Hoog subsequently validated the name in 1977, giving the accepted author citation G. Arnaud ex de Hoog.

No sexual state was known in the material reviewed by Akulov in 2011. The genus has historically been treated on the basis of its asexual morphology, while molecular sampling has remained limited.

== Morphology ==
Sporulating colonies are loose and tufted. Young growth is white, becoming pale ochre or yellowish brown with age. The vegetative hyphae are branched, septate, smooth and thin-walled, generally 2–5 μm wide and occasionally reaching about 7.5 μm.

The conidiophores are erect, straight and septate. Ukrainian specimens examined by Akulov measured about 350–650 μm long. They are usually unbranched, although one or two branches may develop near the base. Their width decreases from approximately 6–8 μm at the base to 3–5 μm toward the apex.

The fertile region is cylindrical and somewhat curved, commonly 150–180 μm long. Continued sympodial growth during conidium production may extend it to around 400 μm. Its surface bears numerous pointed conidiogenous denticles about 1–1.5 μm long.

The conidia develop both apically and laterally. They are pale ochre, thick-walled and globose to nearly globose, with a smooth to finely ornamented surface. Akulov recorded diameters of 8–10 μm, occasionally reaching 12 μm. Material compared in 2026 had conidia approximately 9–12 μm in diameter and a smooth to finely verruculose surface.

== Fungicolous ecology ==
Most published collections of R. globulifera have been associated with fruiting bodies of wood-decaying fungi. Reported substrates include Fomes fomentarius, Inonotus dryadeus and Ganoderma tsugae.

Akulov reported the species from Ukraine for the first time in 2011. The collections occurred on several fungal substrates, including a fruit body of Ganoderma applanatum, decaying fruit bodies of Oxyporus latemarginatus, an aethalium of a Fuligo species, and fruit bodies of Nemania serpens.

Earlier culture observations found that the fungus could be isolated from polypore fruit bodies that appeared externally undamaged. This led to the suggestion that it may begin growing internally within its fungal substrate before producing visible surface growth. The proposal concerns its possible mode of development and does not represent a demonstrated complete life cycle.

Records reviewed in 2011 included Georgia, the Netherlands, European Russia, Ukraine, France and the Czech Republic, as well as Japan, the United States and Canada.

== Molecular comparison ==
Molecular information for Rhinotrichella remained sparse when Rhinotrichella carpini was described in 2026 from material associated with dead branches of Carpinus betulus in Ukraine.

The study compared the new species with culture CBS 563.71 of R. globulifera, originally isolated from Ganoderma tsugae in Japan. At that time, R. globulifera was represented in GenBank by the only previously available LSU sequence assigned to the genus, accession MH872026.1.

The LSU sequence of R. carpini matched R. globulifera at 883 of 892 positions. The fungi nevertheless differed morphologically. R. globulifera lacks the long, disarticulating chains of microconidia found in R. carpini, has smaller pimple-shaped conidiogenous denticles, and produces more consistently globose larger conidia.
