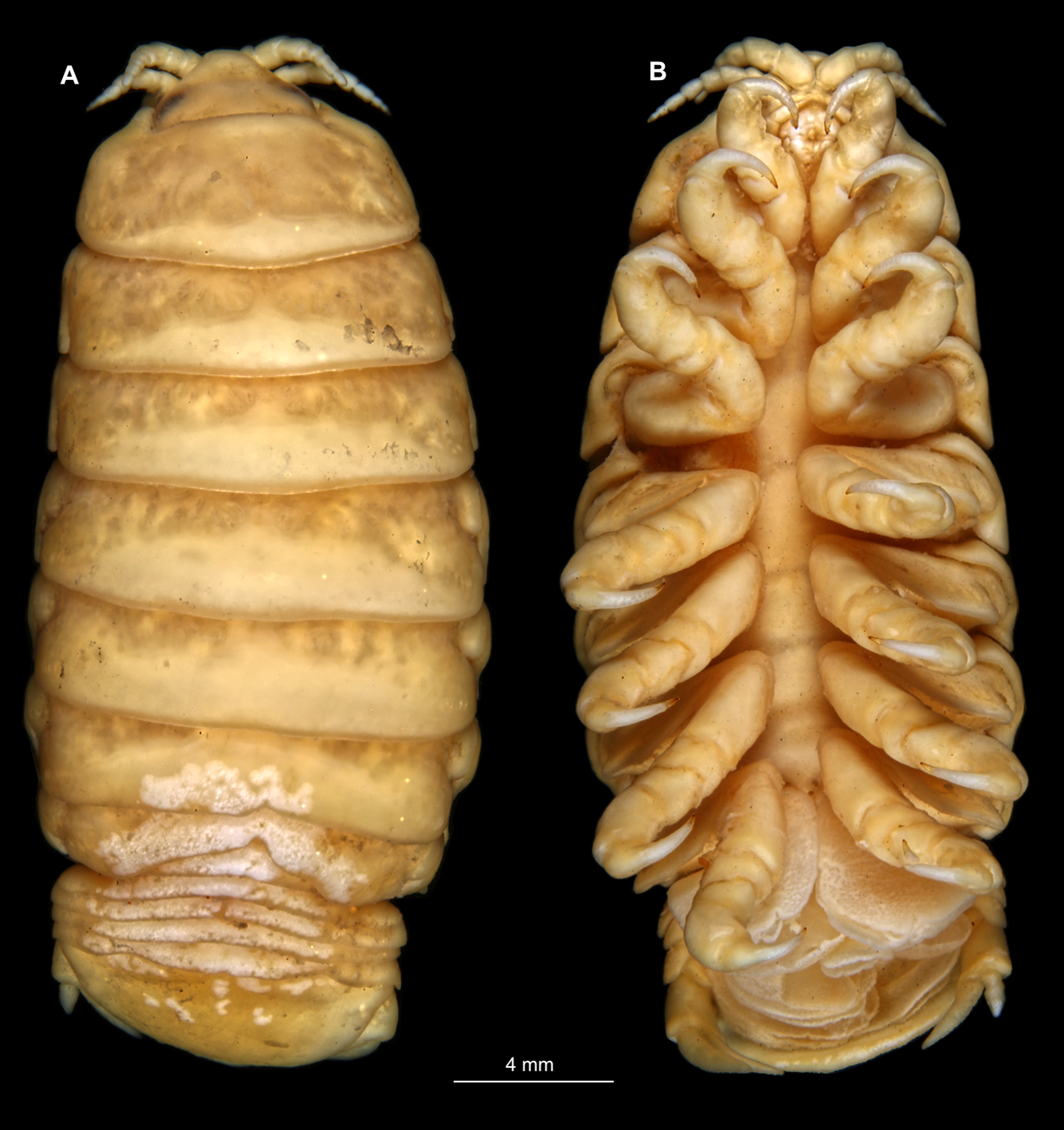

Scientific classification
- Kingdom: Animalia
- Phylum: Arthropoda
- Class: Malacostraca
- Order: Isopoda
- Family: Cymothoidae
- Genus: Ceratothoa; Dana, 1852

Species
- 26 species (see text)

Synonyms
- Codonophilus Haswell, 1881; Cteatessa Schioedte & Meinert, 1883; Meinertia Stebbing, 1893; Rhexana Schioedte & Meinert, 1883; Rhexanella Stebbing, 1911

= Ceratothoa =

Genus of parasitic marine isopods

Ceratothoa is a genus of isopod ectoparasites of teleost fish, first described by James Dwight Dana in 1852. Infection by Ceratothoa can cause anaemia, lesions, growth retardation, emaciation, and mortality in their fish hosts.

== Species ==
Currently, 26 valid species in this genus are recognized:

- Ceratothoa africanae Hadfield, Bruce & Smit, 2014
- Ceratothoa angulata (Richardson, 1910)
- Ceratothoa arimae (Nunomura, 2001)
- Ceratothoa banksii (Leach, 1818)
- Ceratothoa barracuda Martin, Bruce & Nowak, 2015
- Ceratothoa capri (Trilles, 1964)
- Ceratothoa carinata (Bianconi, 1869)
- Ceratothoa collaris Schiödte & Meinert, 1883
- Ceratothoa famosa Hadfield, Bruce & Smit, 2014
- Ceratothoa gilberti (Richardson, 1904)
- Ceratothoa globulus Martin, Bruce & Nowak, 2015
- Ceratothoa gobii Schiödte & Meinert, 1883
- Ceratothoa guttata (Richardson, 1910)
- Ceratothoa imbricata (Fabricius, 1775)
- Ceratothoa italica Schiödte & Meinert, 1883
- Ceratothoa marisrubri Trilles, Colorni & Golani, 1999
- Ceratothoa oestroides (Risso, 1826)
- Ceratothoa oxyrrhynchaena Koelbel, 1878
- Ceratothoa parallela (Otto, 1828)
- Ceratothoa retusa (Schioedte & Meinert, 1883)
- Ceratothoa springbok Hadfield & Smit, 2020
- Ceratothoa steindachneri Koelbel, 1879
- Ceratothoa toyamaensis (Nunomura, 1993)
- Ceratothoa trigonocephala (Leach, 1818)
- Ceratothoa usacarangis (Avdeev, 1979)
- Ceratothoa verrucosa (Schioedte & Meinert, 1883)

C. carinata and C. oxyrrhynchaena were redescribed in 2013, and C. angulata, C. capri, C. carinata, C. collaris, C. gilberti, C. gobii, C. guttata, C. italica, C. oestroides, and C. verrucosa in 2016.

A number of taxa are species inquirendae:

- Ceratothoa contracta (Miers, 1880)
- Ceratothoa deplanata Bovallius, 1885
- Ceratothoa gaudichaudii (H. Milne Edwards, 1840) (previously known as Ceratothoa rapax Heller, 1865)
- Ceratothoa novaezelandiae Filhol, 1885
- Ceratothoa transversa (Richardson, 1901)
- Ceratothoa triglae Gourret, 1891
