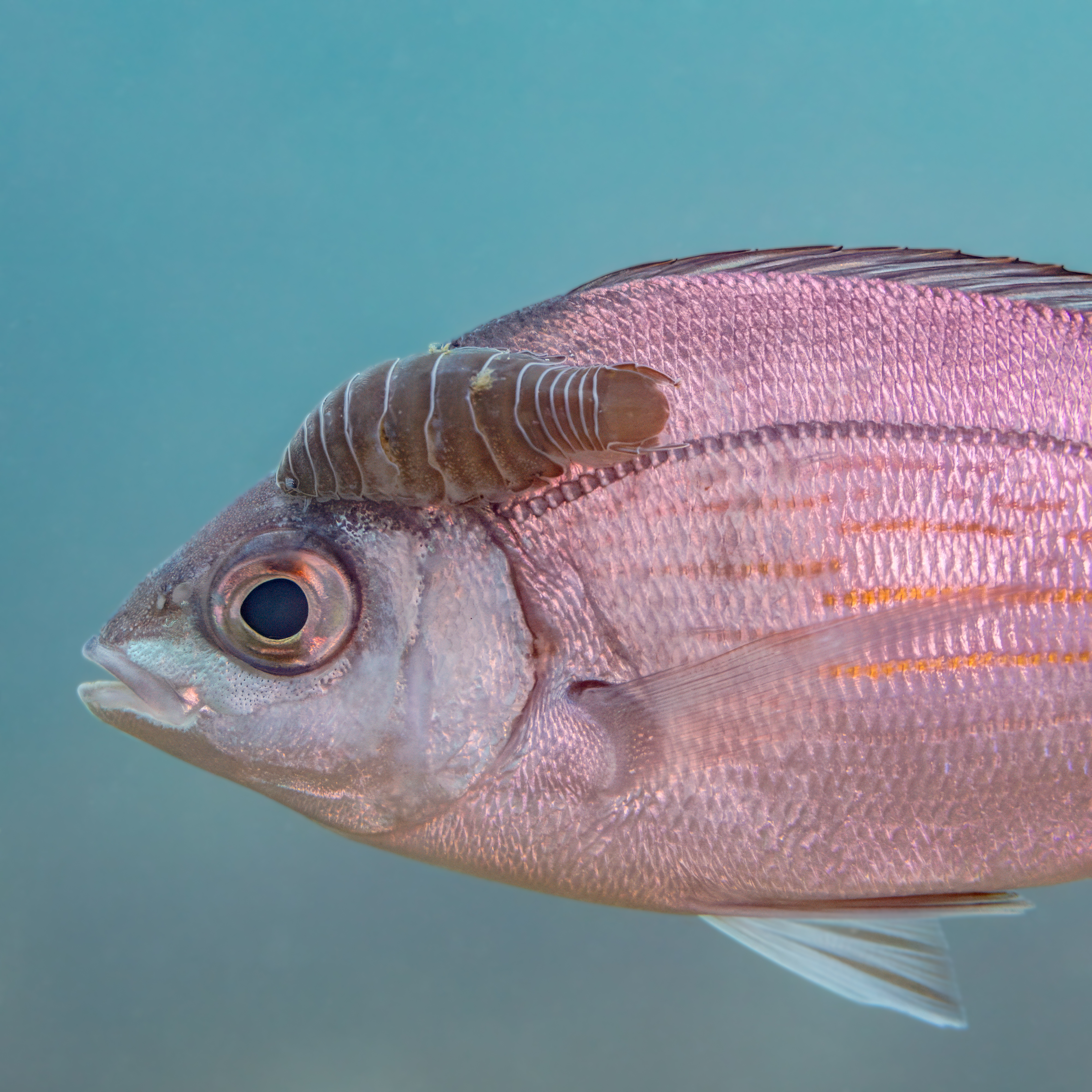
- Anilocra physodes on a black seabream Spondyliosoma cantharus

Scientific classification
- Kingdom: Animalia
- Phylum: Arthropoda
- Clade: Pancrustacea
- Class: Malacostraca
- Order: Isopoda
- Superfamily: Cymothooidea
- Family: Cymothoidae; Leach, 1818

Genera
- c. 40; see text

= Cymothoidae =

Family of crustaceans

The Cymothoidae are a family of isopods in the suborder Cymothoida found in both marine and freshwater environments. Cymoithoids are ectoparasites, usually of fish, and they include the bizarre "tongue-biter" (Cymothoa exigua), which attaches to a fish's tongue, causing it to atrophy, and replaces the tongue with its own body. Ceratothoa oestroides is one of the most devastating ectoparasites in Mediterranean aquaculture. Around 40 genera and more than 380 species of cymothoid are recognised. Species of the Cymothoidae are generally found in warmer waters and rarely in the cool and cold climates.

== Characteristics ==
Cymothoids exhibit various adaptations to their parasitic lifestyles. As juveniles, they are not specific in their requirements, and attach themselves temporarily to the skin of any fish. They produce anticoagulants and suck the fish's blood. They detach from their first host and later find another host. When they have found the correct species of fish for their adult development, they attach more permanently. As adults, most species require a particular host species, and are also site-specific. Locations for attachment chosen by different species of parasite include the skin, fins, gills, and mouth, while some species bore into muscle.

== Biology ==
Cymothoids are protandrous hermaphrodites; each juvenile develops first into a male, but if no females are nearby, the male later becomes a female and attaches permanently to the host. This female is able to secrete pheromones that prevent male cymothoids in the vicinity from becoming female. These parasites can cause serious damage to their hosts, ranging from slow growth rate, through tissue damage and anaemia, to death. Many host fish have mutualistic arrangements with certain shrimps such as Ancylomenes pedersoni, whereby the fish visits a "cleaning station" and the shrimps remove and feed on the cymothoid parasites.

== Classification ==
According to the World Register of Marine Species, the family contains these genera:

- Aegathoa Dana, 1853
- Agarna Schioedte & Meinert, 1884
- Amblycephalon Pillai, 1954
- Anilocra Leach, 1818
- Anphira Thatcher, 1993
- Artystone Schioedte, 1866
- Asotana Schioedte & Meinert, 1881
- Braga Schioedte & Meinert, 1881
- Catoessa Schioedte & Meinert, 1884
- Ceratothoa Dana, 1852
- Cinusa Schioedte & Meinert, 1884
- Creniola Bruce, 1987
- Cterissa Schioedte & Meinert, 1884
- Cymothoa Fabricius, 1787
- Elthusa Schioedte & Meinert, 1884
- Emetha Schioedte & Meinert, 1883
- Glossobius Schioedte & Meinert, 1883
- Ichthyoxenus Herklots, 1870
- Idusa Schioedte & Meinert, 1884
- Isonebula Taberner, 1977
- Joryma Bowman & Tareen, 1983
- Kuna Williams & Williams, 1986
- Lathraena Schioedte & Meinert, 1881
- Livoneca Leach, 1818
- Lobothorax Bleeker, 1857
- Mothocya Costa in Hope, 1851
- Nerocila Leach, 1818
- Norileca Bruce, 1990
- Olencira Leach, 1818
- Ourozeuktes H. Milne-Edwards, 1840
- Paracymothoa Lemos de Castro, 1955
- Philostomella Szidat & Schubart, 1960
- Pleopodias Richardson, 1910
- Plotor Schioedte & Meinert, 1881
- Pseudoirona Pillai, 1964
- Renocila Miers, 1880
- Rhiothra Schioedte & Meinert, 1884
- Riggia Szidat, 1948
- Ryukyua Williams & Bunkley-Williams, 1994
- Smenispa Özdikmen, 2009
- Telotha Schioedte & Meinert, 1884
- Tetragonocephalon Avdeev, 1978
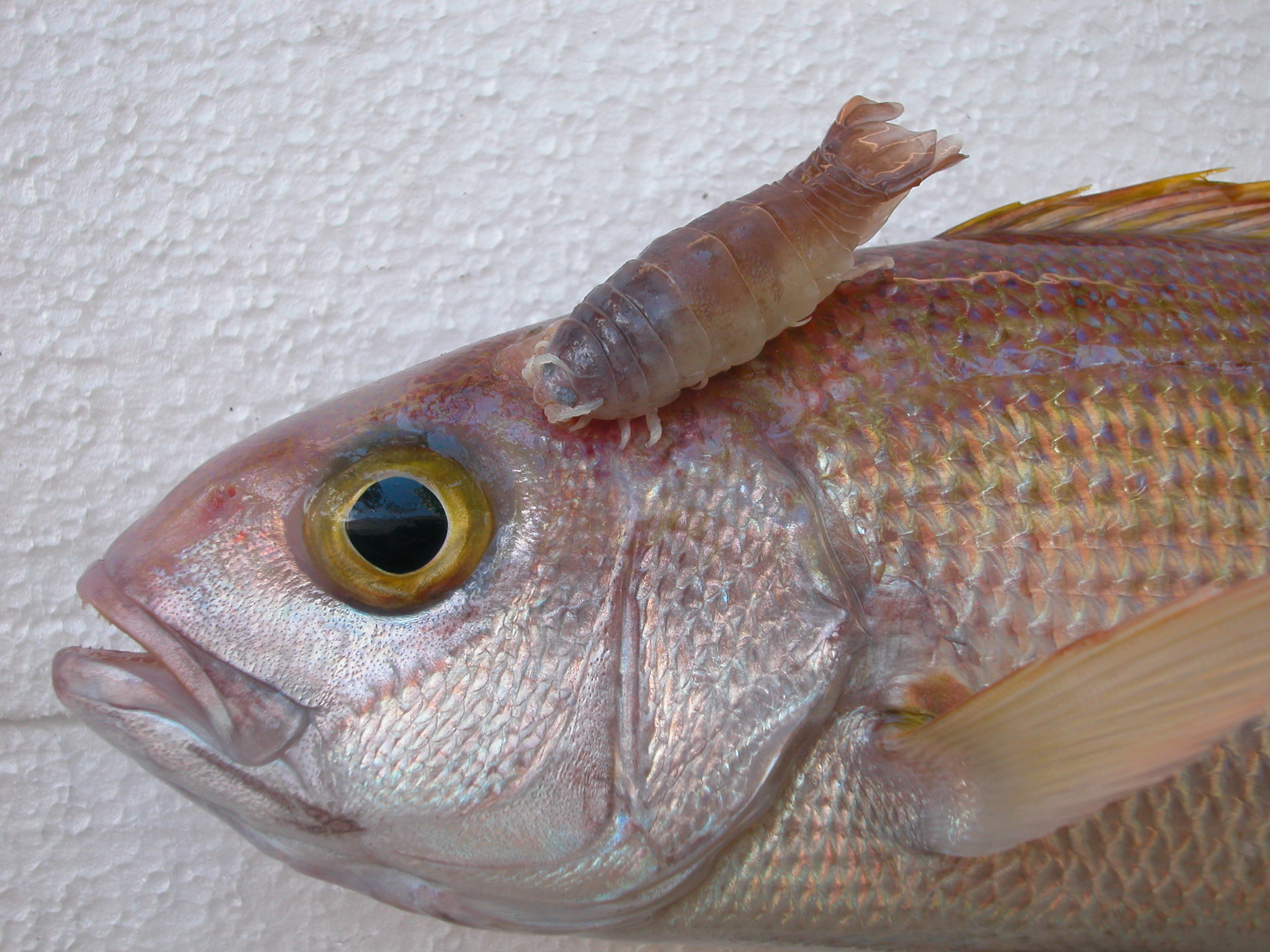
Anilocra gigantea on Pristipomoides filamentosus.tif

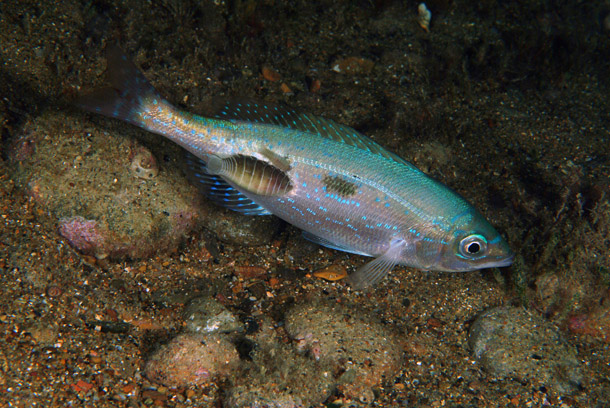
Anilocra sp.

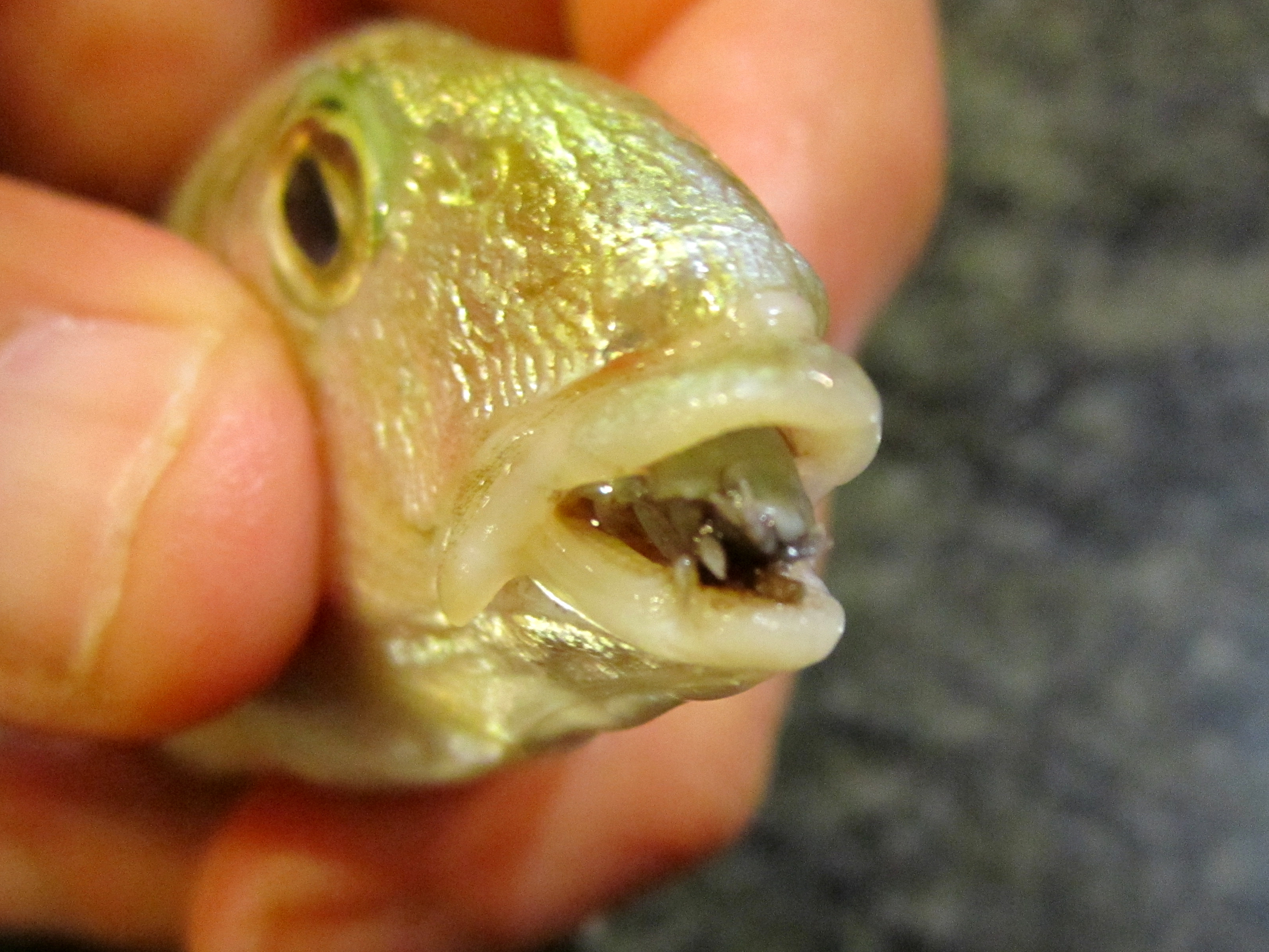
Cymothoa exigua, lingual parasite

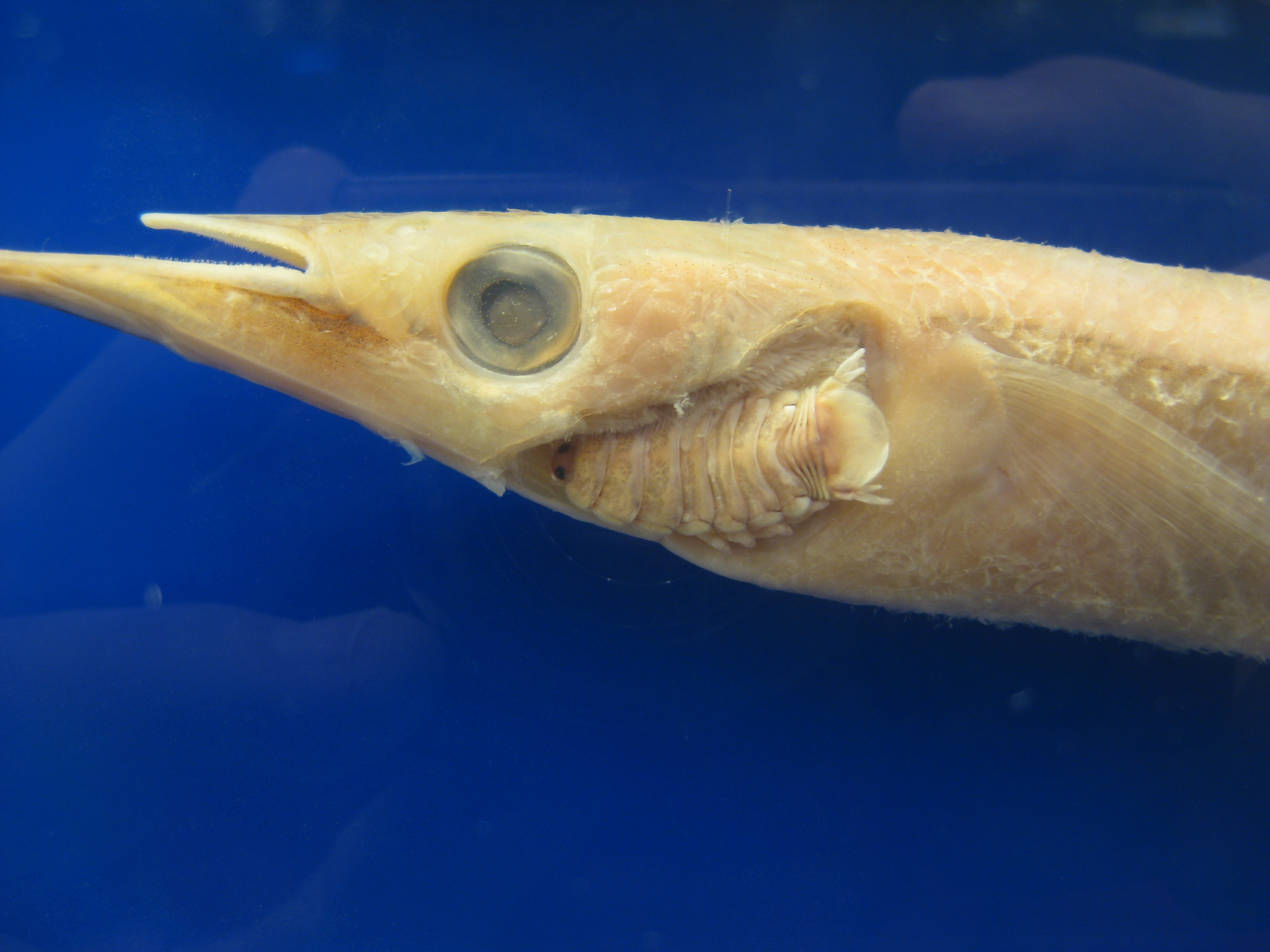
Mothocya sajori

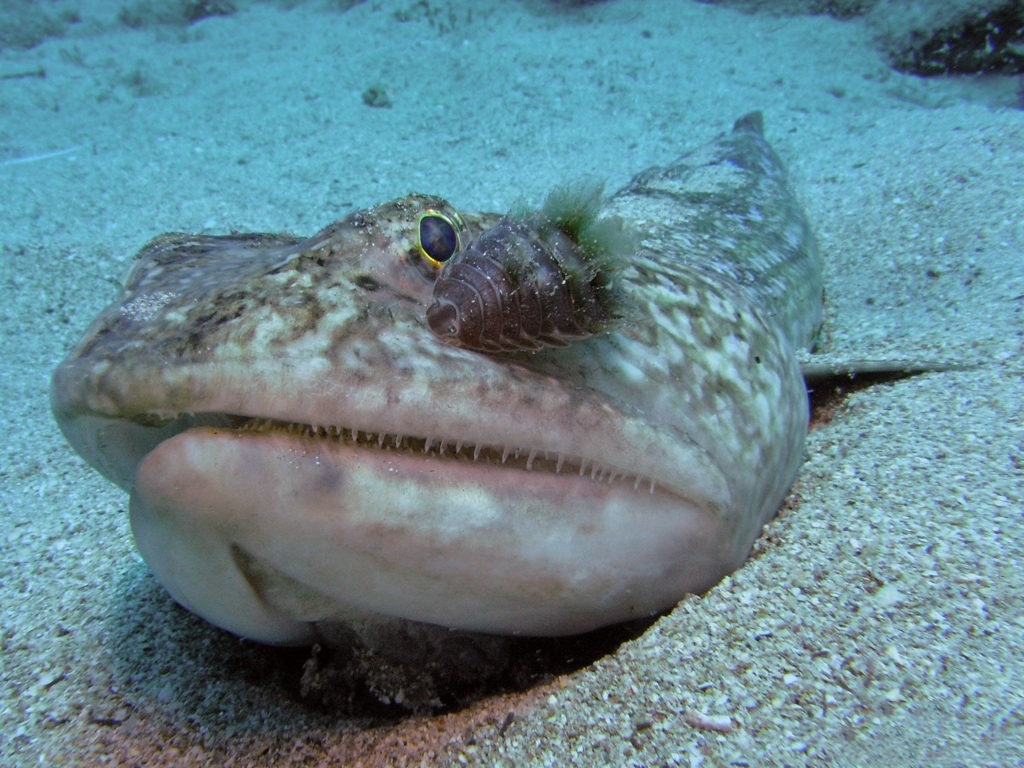
Nerocila armata

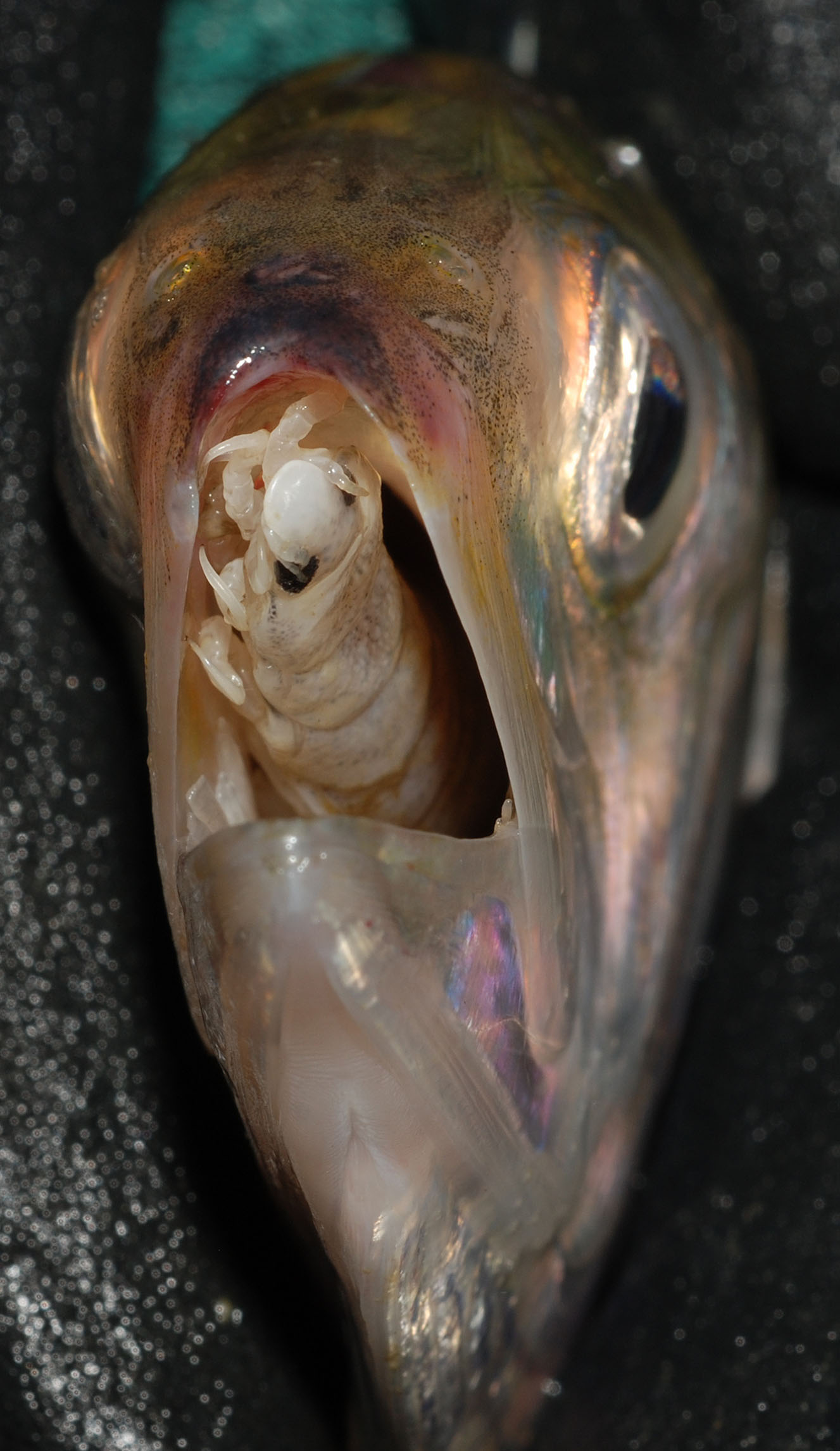
Olencira praegustator

Anilocra brillae on Cephalopholis cruentata, in Cuba
