= List of Cotesia species =

This is a list of species within the braconid wasp genus Cotesia.

== Cotesia species ==
=== A ===
- Cotesia abdinbekovae Papp, 2009
- Cotesia abjecta (Marshall, 1885)
- Cotesia acaudus (Provancher, 1886)
- Cotesia acerbiae Shaw & Vikberg, 2015
- Cotesia acronyctae (Riley, 1870)
- Cotesia acuminata (Reinhard, 1880)
- Cotesia acutula (Tobias, 1973)
- Cotesia adippevora Shaw, 2009
- Cotesia affinis (Nees, 1834)
- Cotesia agricola (Viereck, 1917)
- Cotesia algonquinorum (Viereck, 1917)
- Cotesia alia (Muesebeck, 1958)
- Cotesia alternicolor (You & Zhou, 1988)
- Cotesia alypiae (Muesebeck, 1922)
- Cotesia americana (Lepeletier, 1825)
- Cotesia amesis (Nixon, 1974)
- Cotesia ammalonis (Muesebeck, 1926)
- Cotesia amphipyrae (Watanabe, 1934)
- Cotesia analis (Nees, 1834)
- Cotesia ancilla (Nixon, 1974)
- Cotesia anisotae (Muesebeck, 1921)
- Cotesia anomidis (Watanabe, 1942)
- Cotesia anthelae (Wilkinson, 1928)
- Cotesia aphae (Watanabe, 1934)
- Cotesia arctica (Thomson, 1895)
- Cotesia argynnidis (Riley, 1889)
- Cotesia asavari (Sathe, 1989)
- Cotesia astrarches (Marshall, 1889)
- Cotesia atalantae (Packard, 1881)
- Cotesia aururus (Telenga, 1955)
- Cotesia australiensis (Ashmead, 1900)
- Cotesia autographae (Muesebeck, 1921)
- Cotesia autumnatae Shaw, 2013
- Cotesia ayerzai (Brèthes, 1920)

=== B ===
- Cotesia bactriana (Telenga, 1955)
- Cotesia balli Oltra & Michelena, 1989
- Cotesia bambeytripla (Shenefelt, 1972)
- Cotesia berberidis (Rudow, 1910)
- Cotesia berberis (Nixon, 1974)
- Cotesia bhairavi (Sathe & Inamdar, 1991)
- Cotesia biezankoi (Blanchard, 1960)
- Cotesia bifida (Sharma, 1973)
- Cotesia bignellii (Marshall, 1885)
- Cotesia bonariensis (Brèthes, 1916)
- Cotesia bosei (Bhatnagar, 1950)
- Cotesia brachycera (Thomson, 1895)
- Cotesia brevicornis (Wesmael, 1837)

=== C ===
- Cotesia cajae (Bouché, 1834)
- Cotesia caligophagus (Blanchard, 1964)
- Cotesia callimone (Nixon, 1974)
- Cotesia calodetta (Nixon, 1974)
- Cotesia capucinae (Fischer, 1961)
- Cotesia carduicola (Packard, 1881)
- Cotesia cerurae (Muesebeck, 1926)
- Cotesia charadrae (Muesebeck, 1921)
- Cotesia chares (Nixon, 1965)
- Cotesia cheesmanae (Wilkinson, 1928)
- Cotesia chiloluteelli (You, Xiong & Wang, 1985)
- Cotesia chiloniponellae (You & Wang, 1990)
- Cotesia chilonis (Munakata, 1912)
- Cotesia chinensis (Wilkinson, 1930)
- Cotesia chrysippi (Viereck, 1911)
- Cotesia cingiliae (Muesebeck, 1931)
- Cotesia cirphicola (Bhatnagar, 1950)
- Cotesia cleora (Nixon, 1974)
- Cotesia clepta (Tobias, 1986)
- Cotesia clethrogynae Long, 2014
- Cotesia clisiocampae (Ashmead, 1903)
- Cotesia compressithorax (Hedqvist, 1965)
- Cotesia congestiformis (Viereck, 1923)
- Cotesia congregata (Say, 1836)
- Cotesia corylicolus (Tobias, 1986)
- Cotesia coryphe (Nixon, 1974)
- Cotesia crambi (Weed, 1887)
- Cotesia crassifemorata van Achterberg, 2006
- Cotesia cultellata (Tobias, 1966)
- Cotesia cuprea (Lyle, 1925)
- Cotesia cyaniridis (Riley, 1889)
- Cotesia cynthiae (Nixon, 1974)
- Cotesia cassina (Salgado-Neto, Vásquez & Whitfield, 2021)

=== D ===
- Cotesia danaisae (Hedqvist, 1965)
- Cotesia decaryi (Granger, 1949)
- Cotesia deliadis (Bingham, 1906)
- Cotesia delicata (Howard, 1897)
- Cotesia delphinensis (Granger, 1949)
- Cotesia depressa (Viereck, 1912)
- Cotesia depressithorax (Tobias, 1964)
- Cotesia diacrisiae (Gahan, 1917)
- Cotesia dictyoplocae (Watanabe, 1940)
- Cotesia disparis (Tobias, 1986)
- Cotesia diurnii Rao & Nikam, 1984
- Cotesia diversa (Muesebeck & Walkely, 1951)

=== E ===
- Cotesia effrena (Wilkinson, 1928)
- Cotesia elaeodes (de Saeger, 1944)
- Cotesia electrae (Viereck, 1912)
- Cotesia eliniae Papp, 1989
- Cotesia elongata Zargar & Gupta, 2019
- Cotesia empretiae (Viereck, 1913)
- Cotesia endii (Sathe & Ingawale, 1995)
- Cotesia enypiae (Mason, 1959)
- Cotesia erionotae (Wilkinson, 1928)
- Cotesia errator (Nixon, 1974)
- Cotesia euchaetis (Ashmead, 1898)
- Cotesia eulipis (Nixon, 1974)
- Cotesia eunomiae Shaw, 2009
- Cotesia euphobetri (Blanchard, 1935)
- Cotesia euphydryidis (Muesebeck, 1921)
- Cotesia euprocti Sathe, 2005
- Cotesia euryale (Nixon, 1974)
- Cotesia euthaliae (Bhatnagar, 1950)
- Cotesia evagata (Papp, 1973)
- Cotesia exelastisae (Bhatnagar, 1950)

=== F ===
- Cotesia fascifemorata van Achterberg, 2006
- Cotesia ferruginea (Marshall, 1885)
- Cotesia fiskei (Viereck, 1910)
- Cotesia flagellator (Wilkinson, 1930)
- Cotesia flagitata (Papp, 1971)
- Cotesia flaviconchae (Riley, 1881)
- Cotesia flavicornis (Riley, 1889)
- Cotesia flavipes Cameron, 1891
- Cotesia fluvialis (Balevski, 1980)

=== G ===
- Cotesia gabera Papp, 1990
- Cotesia gades (Nixon, 1974)
- Cotesia gastropachae (Bouché, 1834)
- Cotesia geometricae Austin, 2000
- Cotesia geryonis (Marshall, 1885)
- Cotesia gillettei (Baker, 1895)
- Cotesia glabrata (Telenga, 1955)
- Cotesia glomerata (Linnaeus, 1758)
- Cotesia gonopterygis (Marshall, 1898)
- Cotesia gordii (Muesebeck, 1926)
- Cotesia gramini Sathe & Rokade, 2005
- Cotesia gregalis Yang & Wei, 2002
- Cotesia griffini (Viereck, 1911)

=== H ===
- Cotesia hadenae (Muesebeck, 1926)
- Cotesia halisidotae (Muesebeck, 1931)
- Cotesia hallii (Packard, 1877)
- Cotesia hanshouensis (You & Xiong, 1983)
- Cotesia harteni Papp, 2003
- Cotesia hemileucae (Riley, 1881)
- Cotesia hesperidivora (Viereck, 1912)
- Cotesia hiberniae (Kurdjumov, 1912)
- Cotesia hispanica (Oltra & Falco, 1996)
- Cotesia honora Papp, 1990
- Cotesia hyperion (de Saeger, 1944)
- Cotesia hyphantriae (Riley, 1887)
- Cotesia hypopygialis (Granger, 1949)
- Cotesia hypsipylae (Wilkinson, 1928)

=== I ===
- Cotesia icipe Fernandez-Triana & Fiaboe, 2017
- Cotesia indica Sathe & Rokade, 2005
- Cotesia inducta (Papp, 1973)
- Cotesia intermixta (Balevski, 1980)
- Cotesia invirae Salgado-Neto & Whitfield, 2019
- Cotesia ishizawai (Watanabe, 1939)
- Cotesia isolde (Nixon, 1974)
- Cotesia itororensis Sousa-Lopes & Whitfield, 2019

=== J ===
- Cotesia jayanagarensis (Bhatnagar, 1950)
- Cotesia jucunda (Marshall, 1885)
- Cotesia judaica (Papp, 1970)
- Cotesia jujubae (Wilkinson, 1929)
- Cotesia juniperatae (Bouché, 1834)
- Cotesia junoniae (Riley, 1889)

=== K ===
- Cotesia kamiyai (Watanabe, 1934)
- Cotesia kariyai (Watanabe, 1937)
- Cotesia karviri Sathe & Rokade, 2005
- Cotesia kasparyani (Tobias, 1976)
- Cotesia kazak (Telenga, 1949)
- Cotesia khuzestanensis Zargar & Gupta, 2019
- Cotesia koebelei (Riley, 1889)
- Cotesia kraussi (Muesebeck, 1958)
- Cotesia kurdjumovi (Telenga, 1955)

=== L ===
- Cotesia laeviceps (Ashmead, 1890)
- Cotesia langei (Muesebeck, 1938)
- Cotesia lepidopteri Sathe & Rokade, 2005
- Cotesia lesbiae (Blanchard, 1947)
- Cotesia levigaster (Granger, 1949)
- Cotesia limbata (Marshall, 1885)
- Cotesia limenitidis (Riley, 1871)
- Cotesia lineola (Curtis, 1830)
- Cotesia lizeri (Blanchard, 1947)
- Cotesia luminata Chen & Song, 2004
- Cotesia lunata (Packard, 1881)
- Cotesia lyciae (Muesebeck, 1926)
- Cotesia lycophron (Nixon, 1974)

=== M ===
- Cotesia mahoniae (Mason, 1975)
- Cotesia malevola (Wilkinson, 1929)
- Cotesia malshri (Sathe & Inamdar, 1991)
- Cotesia marginiventris (Cresson, 1865)
- Cotesia mayaguezensis (Viereck, 1913)
- Cotesia medicaginis (Muesebeck, 1947)
- Cotesia meghrangini Dawale, Bhosale & Sathe, 1993
- Cotesia melanoscelus (Ratzeburg, 1844)
- Cotesia melitaearum (Wilkinson, 1937)
- Cotesia mendicae (Tobias, 1986)
- Cotesia menezesi (de Santis & Redolfi, 1976)
- Cotesia microsomus (Tobias, 1986)
- Cotesia miyoshii (Watanabe, 1932)
- Cotesia murtfeldtae (Ashmead, 1898)
- Cotesia muzaffarensis (Lal, 1939)

=== N ===
- Cotesia nemoriae (Ashmead, 1898)
- Cotesia neptisis (Watanabe, 1934)
- Cotesia neustriae (Tobias, 1986)
- Cotesia nigritibialis (Tobias, 1986)
- Cotesia nikami Kurhade & Nikam, 1998
- Cotesia nitens (Muesebeck, 1921)
- Cotesia noctuidiphagus (Muesebeck, 1926)
- Cotesia nonagriae (Olliff, 1893)
- Cotesia nothus (Marshall, 1885)
- Cotesia nuellorum Whitfield, 2018
- Cotesia numen (Nixon, 1974)
- Cotesia nycteus (de Saeger, 1944)

=== O ===
- Cotesia obscuricornis (Viereck, 1917)
- Cotesia ocneriae (Ivanov, 1899)
- Cotesia oeceticola (Blanchard, 1935)
- Cotesia ofella (Nixon, 1974)
- Cotesia ogara Papp, 1990
- Cotesia okamotoi (Watanabe, 1921)
- Cotesia olenidis (Muesebeck, 1922)
- Cotesia onaspis (Nixon, 1974)
- Cotesia oppidicola (Granger, 1949)
- Cotesia opsiphanis (Schrottky, 1909)
- Cotesia ordinaria (Ratzeburg, 1844)
- Cotesia orestes (Nixon, 1974)
- Cotesia orientalis Chalikwar & Nikam, 1984
- Cotesia ornatricis (Muesebeck, 1958)
- Cotesia orobenae (Forbes, 1883)

=== P ===
- Cotesia pachkuriae (Bhatnagar, 1950)
- Cotesia paludicolae (Cameron, 1909)
- Cotesia paphi (Schrottky, 1902)
- Cotesia pappi Inanç, 2002
- Cotesia parastichtidis (Muesebeck, 1921)
- Cotesia parbhanii (Rao, 1969)
- Cotesia parijati Sathe, 2003
- Cotesia parvicornis (de Saeger, 1944)
- Cotesia peltoneni (Papp, 1987)
- Cotesia philoeampus (Cameron, 1911)
- Cotesia phobetri (Rohwer, 1915)
- Cotesia pholisorae (Riley, 1889)
- Cotesia pieridis (Bouché, 1834)
- Cotesia pilicornis (Thomson, 1895)
- Cotesia pistrinariae (Wilkinson, 1929)
- Cotesia planula Song & Chen, 2004
- Cotesia plathypenae (Muesebeck, 1921)
- Cotesia podunkorum (Viereck, 1912)
- Cotesia praepotens (Haliday, 1834)
- Cotesia pratapae (Ashmead, 1896)
- Cotesia prenidis (Muesebeck, 1921)
- Cotesia progahinga (Hedqvist, 1965)
- Cotesia prozorovi (Telenga, 1955)
- Cotesia pterophoriphaga (Shenefelt, 1972)
- Cotesia pyralidis (Muesebeck, 1921)
- Cotesia pyraustae (Viereck, 1912)
- Cotesia pyrophilae (Muesebeck, 1926)

=== R ===
- Cotesia radiantis (Wilkinson, 1929)
- Cotesia radiarytensis (Shenefelt, 1972)
- Cotesia rangii (Bhatnagar, 1950)
- Cotesia risilis (Nixon, 1974)
- Cotesia riverai (Porter, 1916)
- Cotesia rubecula (Marshall, 1885)
- Cotesia rubripes (Haliday, 1834)
- Cotesia ruficoxis (Hedwig, 1962)
- Cotesia ruficrus (Haliday, 1834)
- Cotesia rufiventris (Bingham, 1906)
- Cotesia rufocoxalis (Riley, 1881)
- Cotesia rugosa (Szépligeti, 1914)
- Cotesia ruidus (Wilkinson, 1928)

=== S ===
- Cotesia salebrosa (Marshall, 1885)
- Cotesia saltator (Thunberg, 1822)
- Cotesia saltatoria (Balevski, 1980)
- Cotesia sasakii (Watanabe, 1932)
- Cotesia satunini (Tobias, 1986)
- Cotesia scabricula (Reinhard, 1880)
- Cotesia schaeferi (Marsh, 1979)
- Cotesia schaffneri (Muesebeck, 1931)
- Cotesia schini (Muesebeck, 1958)
- Cotesia schizurae (Ashmead, 1898)
- Cotesia scitula (Riley, 1881)
- Cotesia scotti (Valerio & Whitfield, 2009)
- Cotesia selenevora Shaw, 2009
- Cotesia senegalensis (Risbec, 1951)
- Cotesia sericea (Nees, 1834)
- Cotesia sesamiae (Cameron, 1906)
- Cotesia setebis (Nixon, 1974)
- Cotesia seyali (Risbec, 1951)
- Cotesia shemachaensis (Tobias, 1976)
- Cotesia shrii Sathe, Ingawale & Bhosale, 1994
- Cotesia sibyllarum (Wilkinson, 1936)
- Cotesia simurae (You & Zhou, 1989)
- Cotesia smerinthi (Riley, 1881)
- Cotesia sorghiellae (Muesebeck, 1933)
- Cotesia specularis (Szépligeti, 1896)
- Cotesia sphenarchi (Risbec, 1951)
- Cotesia sphingivora (Granger, 1949)
- Cotesia spuria (Wesmael, 1837)
- Cotesia subancilla (Balevski, 1980)
- Cotesia subordinaria (Tobias, 1976)
- Cotesia suvernii Sathe, Ingawale & Bhosale, 1994
- Cotesia suzumei (Watanabe, 1932)

=== T ===
- Cotesia taprobanae (Cameron, 1897)
- Cotesia tatehae (Watanabe, 1932)
- Cotesia tegera (Papp, 1977)
- Cotesia teleae (Muesebeck, 1926)
- Cotesia telengai (Tobias, 1972)
- Cotesia tenebrosa (Wesmael, 1837)
- Cotesia testacea Fujie, Shimizu & Fernandez-Triana, 2018
- Cotesia tetrica (Reinhard, 1880)
- Cotesia thapinthotha Papp, 1990
- Cotesia theae (Sonan, 1942)
- Cotesia theclae (Riley, 1881)
- Cotesia tibialis (Curtis, 1830)
- Cotesia tiracolae (Ashmead, 1896)
- Cotesia tmetocerae (Muesebeck, 1921)
- Cotesia trabalae Gupta, 2016
- Cotesia transuta (de Saeger, 1944)
- Cotesia tuita Papp, 2009
- Cotesia turkestanica (Telenga, 1955)
- Cotesia typhae Fernandez-Triana, 2017

=== U-Z ===
- Cotesia ukrainica (Tobias, 1986)
- Cotesia unicolor (Curtis, 1835)
- Cotesia urabae Austin & Allen, 1989
- Cotesia vanessae (Reinhard, 1880)
- Cotesia vestalis (Haliday, 1834) (diamondback moth parasitoid)
- Cotesia villana (Reinhard, 1880)
- Cotesia viridanae (Tobias, 1986)
- Cotesia xavieri Rousse, 2013
- Cotesia xylina (Say, 1836)
- Cotesia yakutatensis (Ashmead, 1902)
- Cotesia zagrosensis Zargar & Gupta, 2019
- Cotesia zygaenarum (Marshall, 1885)
