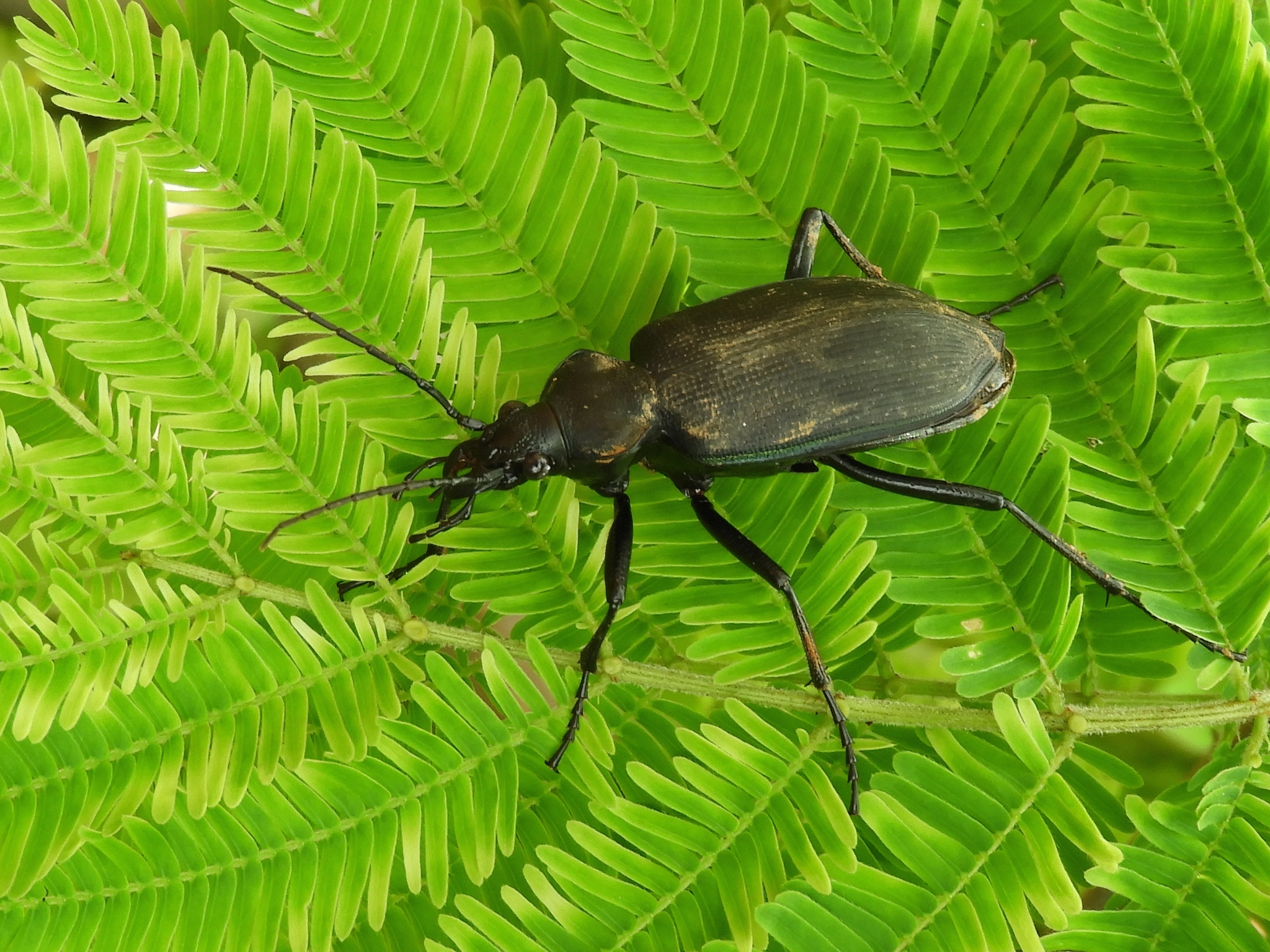

Scientific classification
- Domain: Eukaryota
- Kingdom: Animalia
- Phylum: Arthropoda
- Class: Insecta
- Order: Coleoptera
- Suborder: Adephaga
- Family: Carabidae
- Genus: Calosoma
- Species: C. angulatum

Binomial name
- Calosoma angulatum Chevrolat, 1834

Synonyms
- Calosoma forreri Géhin, 1885; Calosoma uniforme Géhin, 1885; Calosoma angulicolle Chaudoir, 1869

= Calosoma angulatum =

Species of beetle

Calosoma angulatum, the angulate caterpillar hunter, is a species of ground beetle in the subfamily of Carabinae. It was described by Louis Alexandre Auguste Chevrolat in 1834. This species is found in Colombia, Venezuela, Costa Rica, Guatemala, Honduras, Mexico, Nicaragua and the United States (Arizona, California, New Mexico, Texas), where it inhabits premontane moist forests and oak-savannah.

Adults have been recorded preying on Spodoptera frugiperda.
