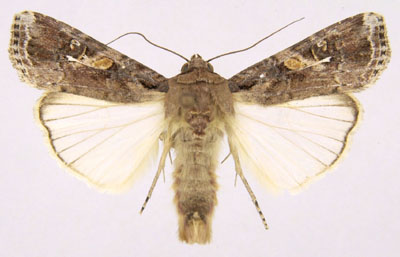

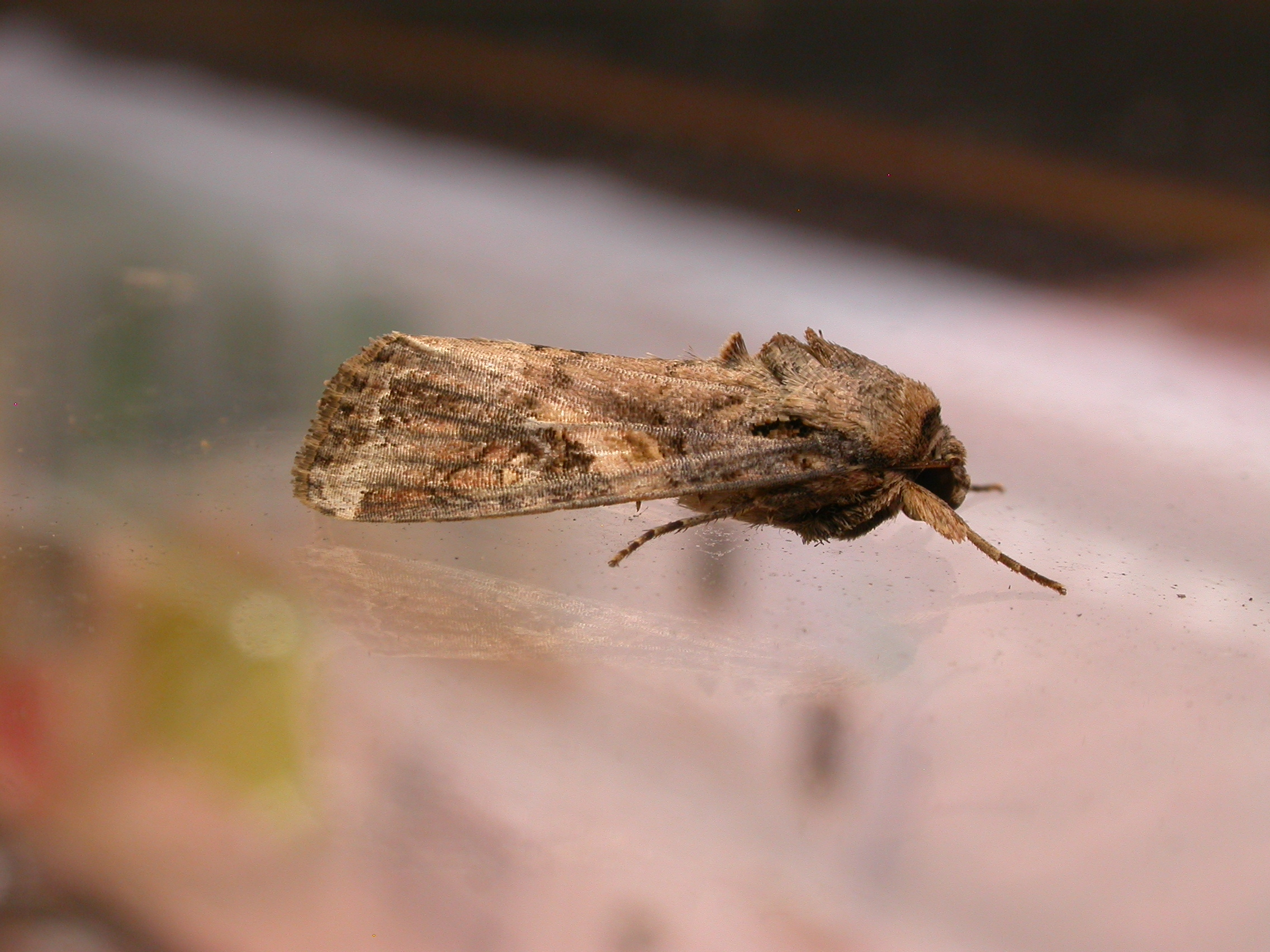

Scientific classification
- Kingdom: Animalia
- Phylum: Arthropoda
- Clade: Pancrustacea
- Class: Insecta
- Order: Lepidoptera
- Superfamily: Noctuoidea
- Family: Noctuidae
- Genus: Spodoptera
- Species: S. frugiperda

Binomial name
- Spodoptera frugiperda (J. E. Smith, 1797)

= Fall armyworm =

Species of moth

The fall armyworm (Spodoptera frugiperda) is a species in the order Lepidoptera and one of the species of the fall armyworm moths distinguished by their larval life stage. The term "armyworm" can refer to several species, often describing the large-scale invasive behavior of the species' larval stage. It is regarded as a pest and can damage and destroy a wide variety of crops, which causes large economic damage. Its scientific name derives from frugiperda, which is Latin for lost fruit, named because of the species' ability to destroy crops. Because of its propensity for destruction, the fall armyworm's habits and possibilities for crop protection have been studied in depth. It is also a notable case for studying sympatric speciation, as it appears to be diverging into two species currently. Another remarkable trait of the larva is that they consistently practice cannibalism, despite its fitness costs.

The fall armyworm is active at a different time of year from the true armyworm, another species in the order Lepidoptera and family Noctuidae, but of the genus Mythimna. Outbreaks of the true armyworm usually occur during the early part of the summer; the fall armyworm does most damage in the late summer in the southern part of the United States, and early fall in the northern regions.

== Description ==
Spodoptera frugiperda

The adult moths are 32 to 40 millimetres (1 1/4 to 1 1/2 in) wing tip to wing tip, with a brown or gray forewing, and a white hindwing. There is slight sexual dimorphism, with males having more patterns and a distinct white spot on each of their forewings. The first larval instar is light colored with a larger dark head. As they develop through instars, they become browner with white lengthwise lines. They also develop dark spots with spines.

== Geographic range ==
=== Native range ===
The fall armyworm is widely distributed in eastern and central North America and in South America. It cannot survive overwinter in below freezing temperatures, so it only survives the winter in the most southern regions of the United States, namely Texas and Florida. Because of this, the fall armyworm is a more prominent pest in southeastern states. However, seasonally it will spread across the eastern United States and up to southern Canada, inhabiting areas with suitable food supplies.

=== Introduced range ===
The potential global distribution of S. frugiperda has been modelled using CLIMEX. The modelled global potential distribution reflects the marked seasonal range dynamics experienced in North America, with much of the potential range in Europe, South Africa, China and Australia consisting of habitat that is only climatically suitable during the warmer months.. A more recent physiologically-based population dynamics model was developed for assessing the potential distribution of S. frugiperda in Europe. The model showed that the Mediterranean coastal areas of Southern Europe might be particularly suitable for the establishment of the species.

==== Africa ====
S. frugiperda was first found on the African continent in 2013 in Sao Tome, then spread through Nigeria, Benin, Togo, and was found in Ghana in February 2017. In December 2020 S. frugiperda was first found in Syria in Daraa on the Jordanian border and is believed to have arrived from there without human assistance, having just been found in that country also. The fall armyworm is causing significant damage to maize crops in Africa and has great potential for further spread and economic damage. It has since spread to 28 countries in Africa.

==== Asia ====
S. frugiperda was first detected in Bangladesh in late 2018. As of 23 January 2020 it has reached 37 districts. As a result of the introduction of S. frugiperda and lumpy skin disease within a few months of each other, the FAO, the World Food Programme, Bangladesh Government officials, and others agreed to begin improving Bangladesh's agricultural emergency response capabilities. The use of two biopesticides – Spodoptera frugiperda nuclear polyhedrosis virus/SfNPV (the SNPV/single nuclear polyhedrosis virus specific to S. frugiperda) and Habrobracon hebetor – is recommended.

In December 2018, the Fall armyworm began to spread widely in India. In January 2019, a heavy infestation of fall armyworm was recorded in corn plantations in Sri Lanka.

The pest was first detected in China in the southwest province of Yunnan in January 2019 (or June 2019). Through 2019, the pest infested a total of 26 provinces. The armyworm is expected in 2020 to hit China's Northeast wheat belt. A report issued by the Ministry of Agriculture and Rural Affairs rates the situation as "very grave".

The fall armyworm was first reported in Southeast Asia in late 2018 in Thailand and Myanmar and its presence is now confirmed in almost all Southeast Asian countries.

==== Oceania ====
In January 2020 S. frugiperda was detected on the Torres Strait Islands, in February in North Queensland, and then continued into the rest of Queensland, and the Northern Territory, Western Australia, and then in September was found in New South Wales between Moree and Boggabilla (and later in Narrabri, Wee Waa, Dubbo, Breeza, and Maitland). S. frugiperda is expected to severely impact Queensland's wool industry because it feeds on all major grazing plants. It was observed in traps baited with a male pheromone lure, firstly on Darnley Island and Saibai islands in the Torres Strait, and subsequently on the mainland near Croydon. Within a week it was officially declared ineradicable. In April 2020, it was detected in Papua New Guinea, spreading across the Torres Strait.

Fall armyworm was first detected in New Zealand in February 2022. Biosecurity New Zealand and sector partners ran a biosecurity response to limit the spread of Fall armyworm and try to eradicate it from New Zealand. This included surveillance and research to better understand the moth, its spread, and potential impacts in New Zealand. By April 2023, it became clear that Fall armyworm was widespread, particularly in the North Island, and that eradication was unlikely because it had been windblown from Australia, and this is likely to repeatedly occur.

== Diet ==
=== Larvae ===
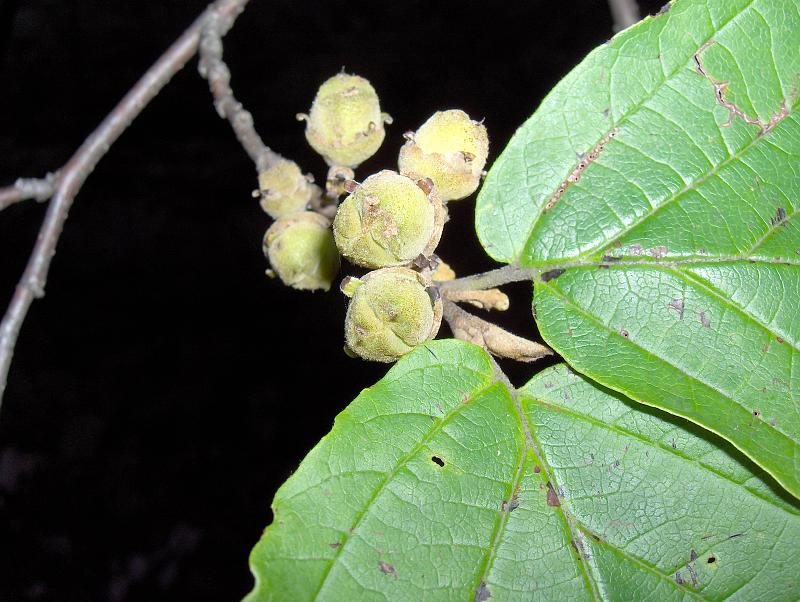
Witch hazel

The armyworm's diet consists mainly of grasses and grain crops such as corn, but the species has been noted to consume over 80 different plants (50 non-economic and 30 economic plants). Armyworms earned their common name by eating all plant matter they encounter in their wide dispersals, like a large army. A few sweet corn varieties have partial, but not complete, resistance to armyworms. The resistance comes from a unique 33-kD proteinase that the corn produces when it is being fed on by fall armyworms or other larvae. This protein was found to significantly decrease fall armyworm larva growth.

==== Cannibalism ====
When possible, larvae will cannibalize the larvae of smaller instars. A 1999 study showed that cannibalism only benefits the caterpillar when other food is scarce. Despite this, the caterpillars will cannibalize others whenever they can, even though it was found to decrease their own fitness in many cases. One known reason why cannibalism is detrimental to the fall armyworm is because of disease transmission to the cannibal. In nature, the negative effects of cannibalism may be balanced by the fact that cannibalism removes competitors, thereby making more resources accessible and indirectly increasing fall armyworms' fitness.

=== Adults ===
Adult moths drink nectar from flowers such as that of witch hazel (Hamamelis virginiana).

== Life history ==
The fall armyworm's life cycle is completed within 30 days during summer, and 60 days during the spring and autumn seasons; during the winter, these caterpillars' life cycle lasts about 80 to 90 days.^{[3]} The number of generations a moth will have in a year varies based on climate, but in her life span a female will typically lay about 1,500 eggs. Because larvae cannot enter into diapause they cannot survive cold temperatures.

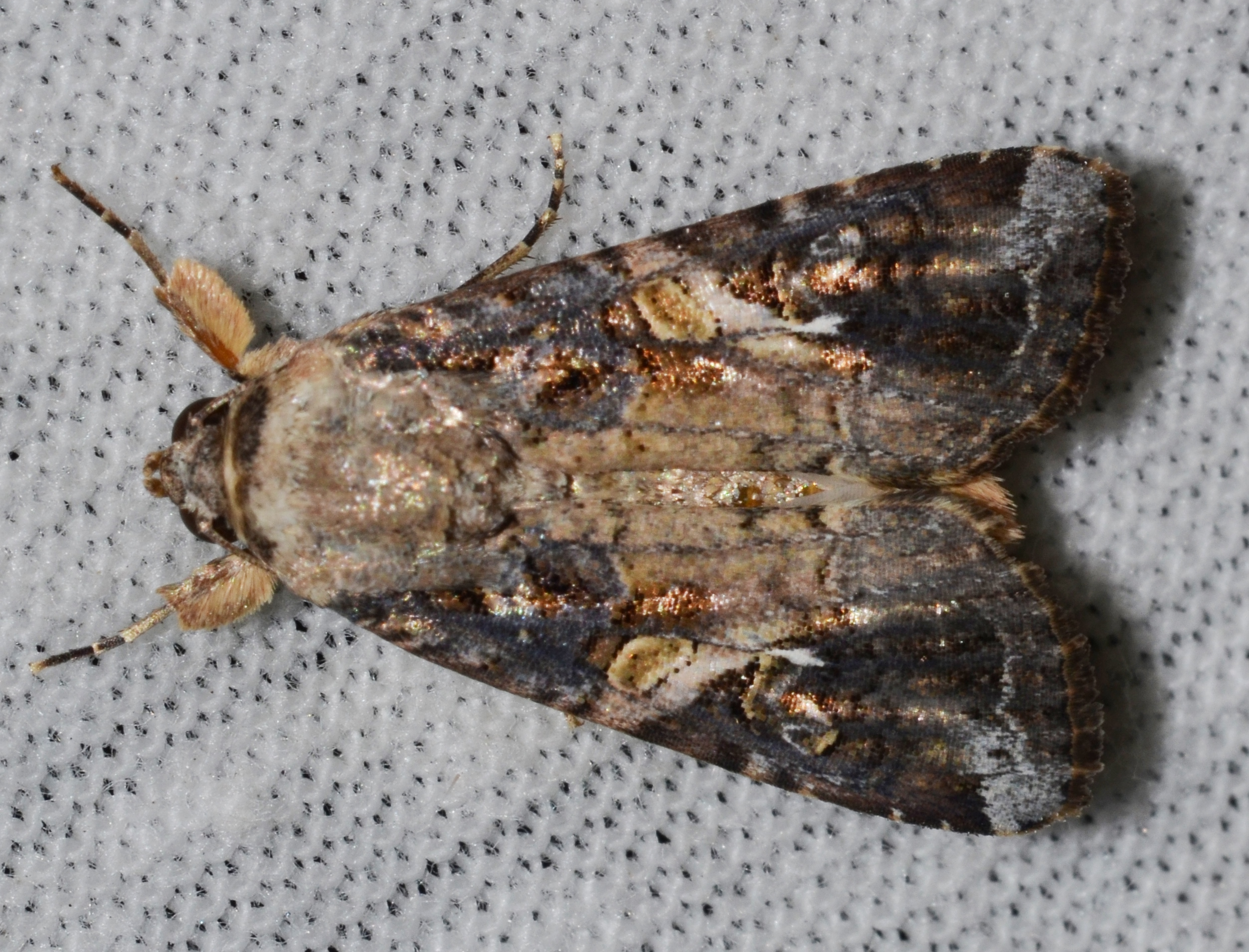
Adult

=== Egg ===
The armyworm's egg is dome-shaped, and measures around 0.4 millimetres (1/64 in) in diameter and 0.3 millimetres (3/256 in) in height. Females prefer to lay eggs on the underside of leaves, but in high populations they will lay them just about anywhere. In warm weather, the eggs will hatch into larvae within a few days.

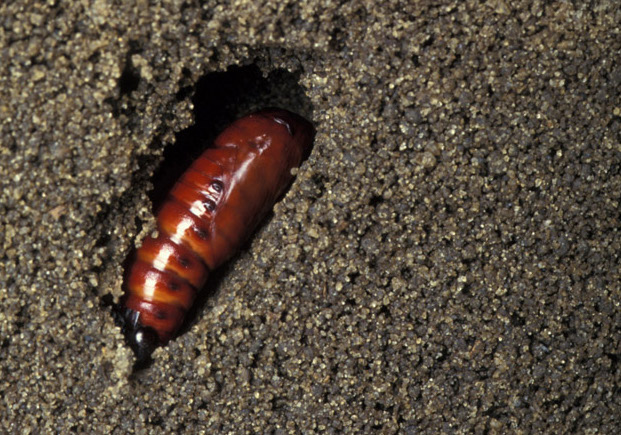
Pupa

=== Larva ===
The larvae go through six different instars, each varying slightly in physical appearance and pattern. The larva process lasts from 14 to 30 days, again depending on temperatures. The mature caterpillar is about 1 1/2–2 inches (38–51 mm) in length. This is the most destructive life stage as the larvae have biting mouth parts. The larvae have a distinctive inverted Y suture on the forehead.

=== Pupa ===
The larvae then pupate underground for 7 to 37 days in a cocoon they form of soil and silk. Duration and survival of the pupal stage depend on the temperature of the environment.

=== Adults ===
Once emerged, the adults live for about 10 days, and sometimes up to 21 days, with the female laying most of her eggs early in life. Adults are nocturnal and fare best during warm and humid nights.

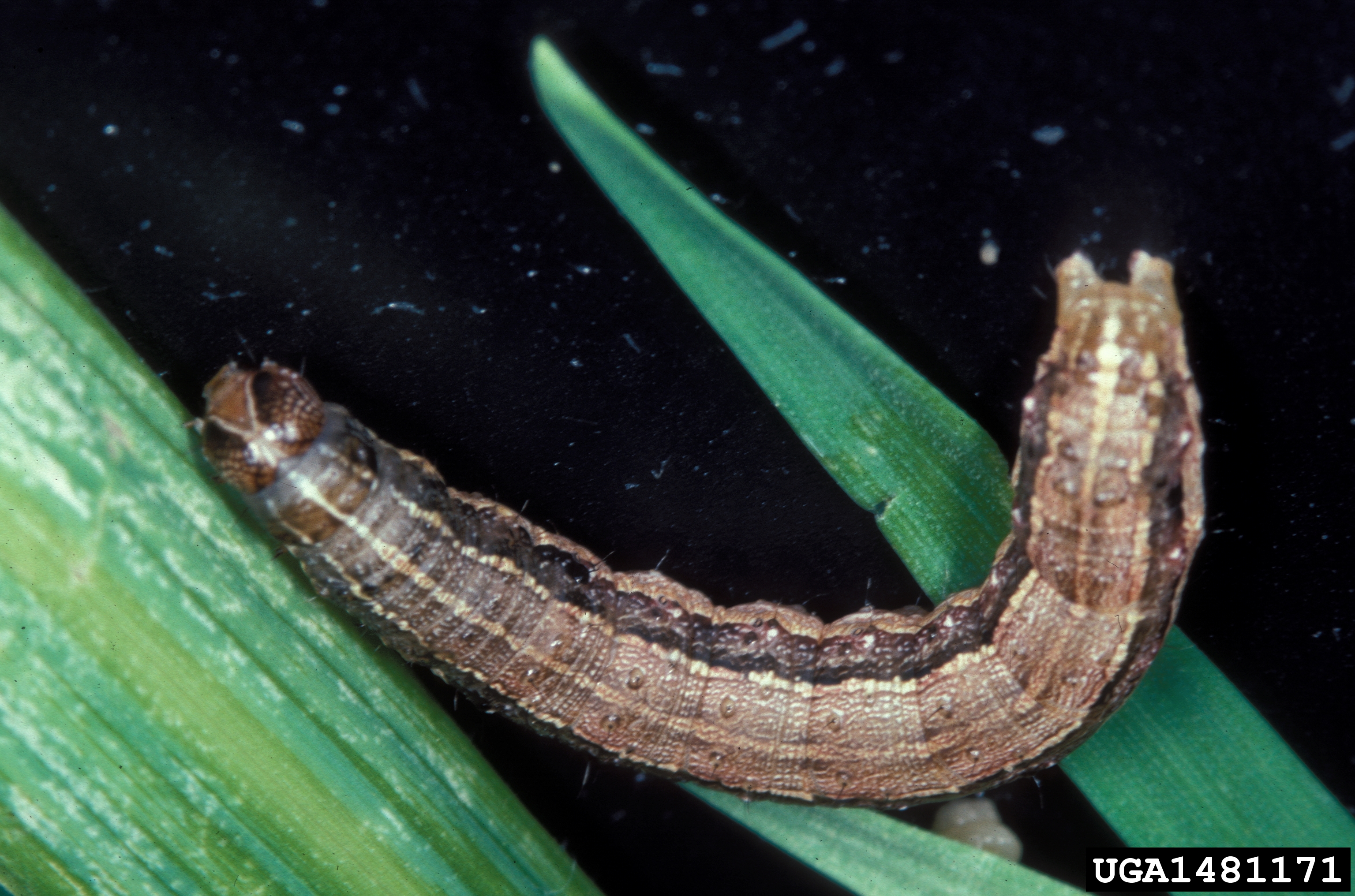
Caterpillar

=== Reproduction ===
A female attracts males by perching atop a host plant feeding area and releasing a sex pheromone as the signal that she wishes to mate. The pheromone has been studied and found to contain the components Z7-12 and Z9-14. Each female only mates once per night; this creates a physical conflict between the multiple males that will fly towards a ready female. There is an order to which the females call and mate: virgin females do first, females who have mated once next, and females who have already mated multiple times call and mate last during the night.

== Migration ==
Adults are capable of flying long distances, so even though they are unable to overwinter north of the southern region of the United States, the moths can migrate as far north as southern Canada in warm months. Their migration rate is remarkably fast, estimated at 300 miles (483 km) per generation. Some scientists speculate that this fast migration is aided by the movement of air in weather fronts.

== Neurochemistry ==
Allatotropin and allatotropin+allatostatin C – neuropeptides – extracted from Manduca sexta were both found to suppress feeding in all life stages, increase larval mortality, and reduce adult lifespan, by Oeh et al 2000.

== Enemies ==
=== Predators ===
Fall armyworm caterpillars are directly preyed upon by many invertebrates and vertebrates. Common predators include birds, rodents, beetles, earwigs, and other insects. It has been shown that direct predation can cause significant losses to caterpillar populations. The larva's main defense against enemies is their ability to reach large numbers and migrate before seasonal conditions are suitable for predators.

=== Parasitoids ===
Fly and wasp parasitoids target the fall armyworm, most commonly Archytas marmoratus, Cotesia marginiventris, and Chelonus texanus. The armyworm is also vulnerable to additional parasitoids, varying with location. In 2018, egg parasitoid wasps of the genera Telenomus and Trichogramma were discovered to attack army worm eggs in East Africa. Cotesia icipe is another African braconid wasp suitable for the biological control of this lepidoptera.

=== Parasites and disease ===
Fifty-three different parasite species have been discovered in fall armyworm larvae, spanning ten different families. Often larvae can survive through much of their crop consumption despite outbreaks of disease, because of the larva's fast life cycle. Despite this, parasites of the fall armyworm are being studied extensively as a means of fighting armyworm attacks on crops. One suggested approach would be to introduce parasites from South America to North American fall armyworms, and vice versa.

=== Fungi ===
In February 2021, it was reported that an Australian agronomist Georgia Rodger had found at a property near Beaudesert (southern Queensland) the tropical fungus Nomuraea rileyi which was known to be effective in killing and consuming fall armyworms. Samples of this were sent to Maree Crawford, the insect pathologist at the Queensland Department of Agriculture for further analysis. Australian entomologists have said the finding is reassuring and that laboratory tests have been promising. This is substantiated by various studies including a 2018 journal article which looked into the effectiveness of N. rileyi had on infestations of armyworms in Indian maize crops. The study concluded N. rileyi could potentially be a cost-effective tool in combating the pest, compatible with eco-friendly management practices, although further studies were required. Farmers in Australia have struggled to control the pest which has been destroying crops, prompting concerns about potential food shortages which could cause an increase in food prices for consumers. The N. rileyi research has given them hope that this can be avoided.

== Subspecies ==
The fall armyworm may be presently undergoing a divergence into two separate species. These two strains have major genetic differences that are connected to the plants they feed on, even though both still exist in the same area (sympatric speciation). These two strains can be loosely categorized into a rice strain and a corn strain. This separation is occurring because of differences in habitat (preferred host plant), and differences in reproductive behavior. The reproductive differences can be divided into two categories: difference in the timing of mating at night, and difference in female sex pheromones.

== Interactions with humans ==
=== Research use ===
S. frugiperda cells (Sf9 and Sf21 cell lines) are commonly used in biomedical research for the purpose of recombinant protein expression using insect-specific viruses called baculoviruses.

=== Vaccine use ===
The Novavax COVID-19 vaccine makes use of baculovirus-infected Sf9 cells to express the SARS-CoV-2 spike protein.

For the 2025/2026 influenza season Sanofi used armyworm cell lines and baculovirus to produce Supemtek TIVr, a trivalent influenza vaccine.

=== Pest of crop plants ===
Illustration of a swarm of larvae, from Brehms Tierleben

Because of their food preferences, fall armyworm larvae can wreak havoc on a wide range of crops. The first historical account of the fall armyworm's destruction was in 1797 in Georgia. Destruction can happen almost over night, because the first stages of a caterpillar's life require very little food, and the later stages require about 50 times more. Because of this rapid change in food consumption, the presence of larvae will not be noticed until they have destroyed almost everything in as little as a night. Some examples of targeted crops include cotton, tobacco, sweet corn, rice, peanuts, and even fruits such as apples, oranges, and many more. The list of possible food sources for the worms is extensive, so crop damage is wide-ranging. It is estimated that almost 40 percent of those species that armyworms target are economically important. Because the larvae eat so much of the plant, they are very detrimental to crop survival and yield. In corn, larvae will even burrow into the corn ear to eat the kernels.

The UN Food and Agriculture Organization estimates that S. frugiperda will reduce maize/corn yields by 17.7 million metric tons (19.5×10^{6} short tons)/annum if not successfully controlled. The fall armyworm have proved to be a pest in many regions, and methods of control continue to be developed.

==== Africa ====
The fall armyworm was identified in Africa in 2016. In early 2017, armyworms infested large swathes of corn crops across southern Africa, devastating the livelihoods of many farmers. It is thought they arrived as an invasive species from the Americas as eggs in imported produce. This is causing immense concern among agricultural experts, due to the potentially huge amount of damage this invasive species will do to African food crops if allowed to spread. Many African countries have agreed to take urgent actions against armyworms.

==== Sri Lanka ====
After being first reported in India in May 2018 in Tamil Nadu, then the Sri Lankan Ministry of Agriculture issued a warning notice to farmers in the northwestern and north central provinces about possible fall armyworm invasion. At the time of warning, crop destruction had already been reported from the Ampara, Anuradhapura, and Polonnaruwa areas. The larvae are known among the local people as Sena dalambuwa (armyworm caterpillar). Not only corn, but also sugarcane plantations were attacked by the caterpillars in Anuradhapura, Ampara, and Monaragala districts.

In December 2018, heavy infestations in corn cultivation were identified. The spread of the moth leads to attack corn all around the country within weeks. On 6 January 2019, caterpillars spread to the Monaragala district and devastated corn crops. At the end of January 2019, the armyworm was present in all districts of Sri Lanka except Nuwara Eliya and Jaffna.

On 29 December 2018, armyworms were recorded from paddy cultivations in the Sinhapura area of Polonnaruwa. In January 2019, caterpillars were also recorded from paddy cultivations of the Nochchiyagama area in the Anuradhapura district.

The Sri Lankan Department of Agriculture recommended 12 pesticides under three categories, to be used alternately every seven days. Organic farming expert, Thilak Kandegama said that the threat can be overcome by sprinkling rice husk ashes as a repellent. Agricultural Ministry also decided to use drone technology for the spraying of insecticides to control the spreading of caterpillars.

== Management and control ==
Because of the fall armyworms' great destructive power, farmers must go to great lengths to deter the larvae. Insecticide is a widely used form of protection; in southern regions, farmers may have to apply insecticide to corn every day. Agricultural drones have been used to apply pesticides, used in China, Vietnam, Zambia and other regions.

The CABI-led programme, Plantwise and partners have several recommendations for managing fall armyworm, these include: planting early, avoiding staggered planting, and inter-cropping with crops that are not susceptible to fall armyworm, such as cassava or yam. They also recommend conserving shelters and flowering plants on the edges for beneficial insects such as ground beetles and parasitoids.

Inter-cropping with the "push-pull" technique with crops such as Desmodium and Napier grass can be used to control fall armyworm.

For some crops, including wheat, sorghum, millet and rice, it is recommend by Plantwise partners to plant short maturing and varieties that are less preferred by S. frugiperda.

Another strategy is to plant crops earlier to avoid the increase in armyworm numbers as the summer progresses.

In South Africa, farmers are using pheromone lures with a combination of Dichlorvos blocks to trap and eliminate male armyworms, with the intention of disrupting mating cycles.

CIMMYT and its partners are using forward genetics to breed for better S. frugiperda resistance in maize. Genome-wide association studies (GWAS) are the most effective method for associating S. f. resistance to the responsible genomic region, especially used in maize/corn but also wheat, sorghum, millet, rice, and legumes. The first uses of conventional breeding in the first decade of the 1900s were reported by Gernet 1917 and Hinds 1914, improving resistance in maize/corn, sorghum, millet, Cynodon dactylon, and Arachis hypogaea.

In Australia, a caterpillar-specific virus packaged as Fawligen biopesticide was approved under emergency regulations in 2020 to help control the armyworm, and the parasitoid wasp Trichogramma pretiosum is also used. Directorate of plant protection Quarantine and storage, Ministry of Agriculture, Govt of India regularly issues advisories from time to time to manage the menace of Fall Army Worm in India.

== See also ==
- African armyworm (Spodoptera exempta) (Africa)
- Common armyworm or true armyworm (Mythimna unipuncta) (North and South America)
- Northern armyworm, Oriental armyworm or rice ear-cutting caterpillar (Mythimna separata) (Asia)
