= M. quinquemaculata =

M. quinquemaculata may refer to:

- Manduca quinquemaculata, the five-spotted hawkmoth, or its larval form the tomato hornworm
- Mordellistena quinquemaculata, a beetle species of the family Mordellidae
