= Cotesia icipe =

Scientific classification
- Kingdom: Animalia
- Phylum: Arthropoda
- Class: Insecta
- Order: Hymenoptera
- Family: Braconidae
- Genus: Cotesia
- Species: C. icipe

Binomial name
- Cotesia icipe Fiaboe, Fernández-Triana, Nyamu, & Agbodzavu 2017

Parasitoid wasp of agricultural pests

Cotesia icipe is a parasitoid species of wasp of the genus Cotesia. Found in tropical Africa and the Arabian Peninsula, it was first discovered as a parasitoid of the Lepidopterans Spodoptera littoralis and beet armyworm (Spodoptera exigua). Therefore it is now being studied as a possible biological control of Lepidopteran pests of amaranth crops in those areas.

== Range ==
Kenya (Yatta Constituency, Mwea Constituency, Kitengela, Thika, and Machakos), Madagascar, Saudi Arabia, South Africa, Yemen, and Ethiopia (Awasa (Hawassa), Jimma, and Awash-Melkasa).

== Hosts ==
- S. exigua, a native host
- S. littoralis, a native host
- S. frugiperda - C. icipe is the primary parasitoid of the invasive agricultural pest S. frugiperda in Ethiopia, and a minor one in Kenya.
