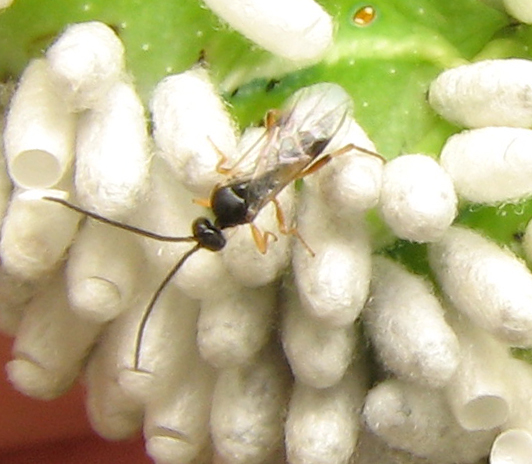
- C. congregata on hornworm Manduca sexta
- Male C. congregata courtship song

Scientific classification
- Kingdom: Animalia
- Phylum: Arthropoda
- Clade: Pancrustacea
- Class: Insecta
- Order: Hymenoptera
- Family: Braconidae
- Genus: Cotesia
- Species: C. congregata

Binomial name
- Cotesia congregata (Say, 1836)

Synonyms
- Microgaster congregata Say, 1836; Apanteles congregata (Say, 1838); Apanteles congregatus; Microgaster utilis French, 1880; Cotesia utilis (French, 1880); Apanteles (Protapanteles) augustus Viereck, 1917; Cotesia augusta (Viereck, 1917)

= Cotesia congregata =

Species of wasp

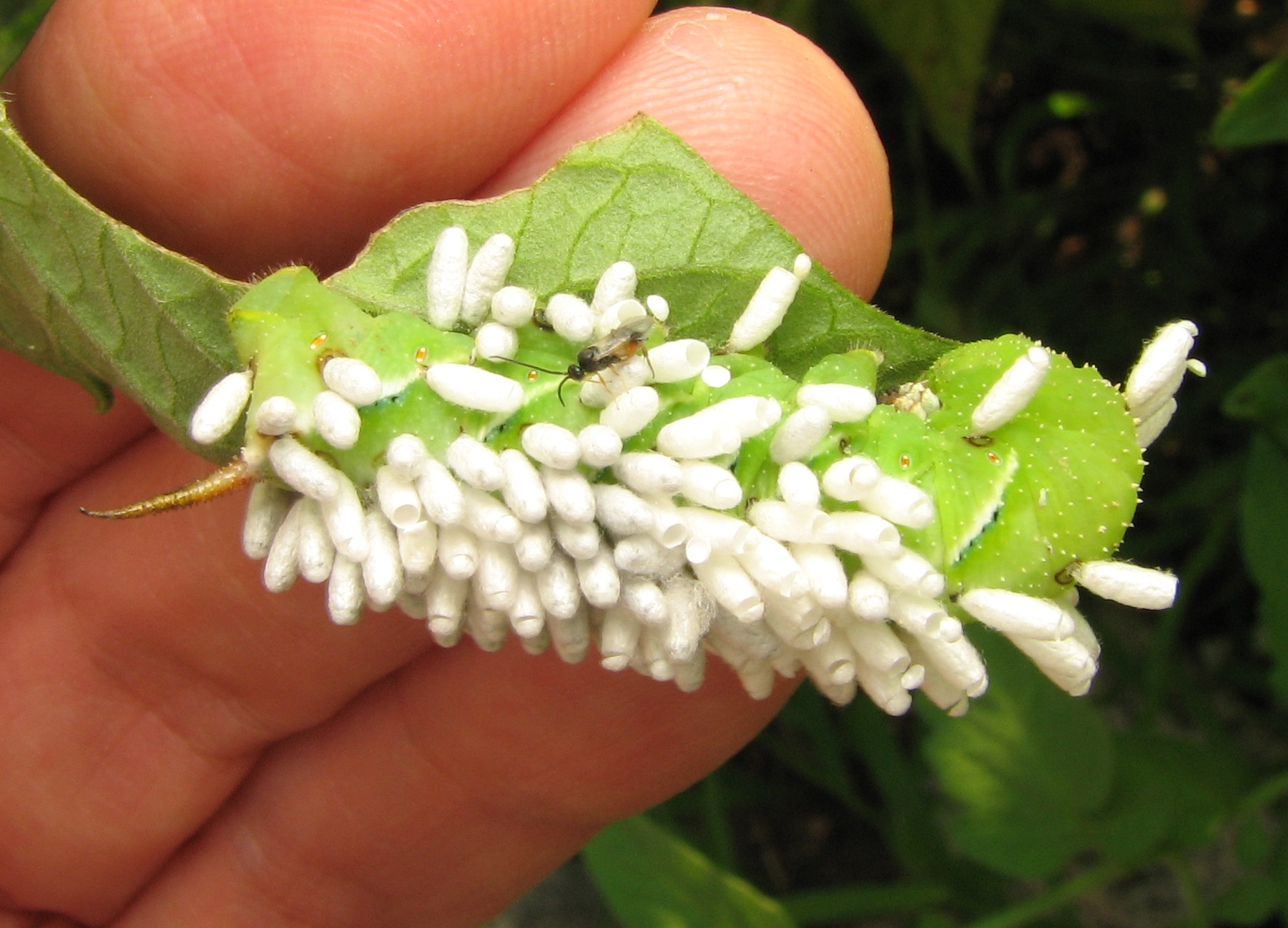
Cocoons of Cotesia congregata on Manduca sexta

Cotesia congregata is a parasitoid wasp of the genus Cotesia. The genus is particularly noted for its use of polydnaviruses. Parasitoids are distinct from true parasites in that a parasitoid will ultimately kill its host or otherwise sterilize it.

== Life cycle ==
Adult wasps lay their eggs in tobacco hornworm (Manduca sexta) and tomato hornworm (Manduca quinquemaculata) larvae in their 2nd or 3rd instar (each instar is a stage between moltings, i.e. the second instar is the life stage after the first molt and before the second molting) and at the same time injects symbiotic viruses into the hemocoel of the host along with some venom. The viruses knock down the internal defensive responses of the hornworm. The eggs hatch in the host hemocoel within two to three days and simultaneously release special cells from the egg's serosa. These special cells, called teratocytes, grow to become giant cells visible to the naked eye. The teratocytes secrete hormones which work in tandem with the virus and the wasp venom to arrest the development of the host. Following hatching in the caterpillar, the wasp larvae will undergo 2 molts inside the host caterpillar's hemocoel and, after 12 to 16 days post oviposition, the 3rd instar wasp larvae will emerge from the caterpillar and spin cocoons from which the adult wasps fly about 4 to 8 days later.

Not all of the parasite larvae will successfully emerge from the host. Dissection of post-emergence caterpillars revealed three categories of remaining larvae:

1. Dead or dying wasp larvae, in various stages of development, which had been partially or completely encapsulated by the host's immune system. The parasite has significant immunosuppressive capabilities, but the host's immune system is able to partially recover over a period of several days, so these may have been encapsulated at a very late stage.
2. Wasp larvae that were alive, but had exhibited reduced growth compared to the other larvae and might not have been able to reach the second instar stage.
3. Wasp larvae in the second instar, similar to those which had emerged successfully.

This insect has the shortest flagellated spermatozoa in animals, being 6.6 μm long (nucleus and flagellum), 8800 times shorter than the longest ones (Drosophila bifurca).

Cotesia pupae may themselves be hyperparasitized by wasps of the genus Hypopteromalus.

== Polydnavirus symbiosis ==
An important aspect of the symbiotic polydnavirus is the fact that the virus does not and cannot replicate on its own- it does not contain the genes necessary to replicate itself. Instead, the genes that code for the virus are contained within the genome of the wasp. The wasp contains special cells called calyx cells within its ovary, which in females will produce the virion particles. Male wasps contain the viral sequence, but do not have the capacity to produce it. The proteins and genetic payload of the virus are produced by these cells, and the virions are assembled within the nucleus of these cells. As the female matures, the nuclear membrane will dissolve, followed by the cell membrane, releasing the virions and cell debris into the lumen of the oviduct. Phagocytic cells will clean up the debris, and the virions will be injected into the host along with eggs and venom upon oviposition.

An average female wasp will produce over 600 ng of viral DNA in each ovary, more than enough for her lifetime. An average female will lay 1757 +/- 945 eggs in her lifetime, and only 0.1 ng of viral DNA is injected per egg.

== Effects of the virus on the host ==
The polydnavirus will severely interfere with development of the host, Manduca sexta. Infected hosts will not undergo metamorphosis, and hosts with a particularly large number of parasites can reach higher weight in the first few instars than uninfected hosts. However, most hosts weigh less than unparasitized caterpillars and after they reach the fifth instar their feeding rate will reduce, causing their weight to decline significantly. The infected host will sometimes reach a supernumerary sixth instar if a high number of parasite larvae are present inside it. This is because there will be more competition for resources among the larger parasite population, causing them to develop more slowly. By contrast, the parasites may emerge in the fourth or even third instar if there are fewer of them than average. With less competition for resources, they will develop more quickly and be ready to emerge sooner.

In some cases, none of the parasites will emerge from a sixth-instar host. All of them will either die or fail to emerge. The hosts in this case would have been large enough to pupate at the end of the fifth instar. However, parasitized caterpillars have far higher levels of juvenile hormone (JH) than unparasitized caterpillars, and this prevents metamorphosis, causing the caterpillar to enter the supernumerary sixth instar instead. Some of these caterpillars will later reach a seventh instar stage, but they will still be unable to pupate and will die in this state.

Sixth-instar caterpillars below the threshold size for pupation at the end of the fifth instar are killed through parasite emergence.

Upon reaching the fifth instar, the caterpillar will enter a wandering stage, as is typical, but will not progress further and will not form a cocoon. The onset of the wandering stage is temporally delayed as well.

Approximately 8 hours before the wasp larvae emerge, the parasitized caterpillar's food consumption significantly declines. This change in behaviour may be a means to prevent the caterpillar from eating the wasp cocoons. At the same time as the caterpillar's food consumption declines, its locomotion also decreases significantly (that is, it moves around less). Without human intervention, the reduced appetite and locomotion are both permanent - the caterpillar will never return to its normal behaviour, even after the parasites have emerged.

Certain neuropeptides were found to accumulate in the neurosecretory system of the host, which were correlated to a change in molting behavior. Similar accumulation has been found in neural system of starving, unparasitized caterpillars, but not nearly to the same extent. The polydnavirus was found to inhibit development of the optic lobe of the host, causing morphological differences. One known hormone which has been focused upon, prothoracicotropic hormone (PTTH), was of particular interest. It is accumulated far more heavily in parasitized and starved hosts than in normal larvae. Other proteins found to increase in neurosecretory cells in both starved and parasitized larvae are: bombyxin, allatostatin, allatotropin, diuretic hormone, FMRFamide, and proctolin. Other proteins were found in increased concentration in hosts from which the wasps had already emerged, such as eclosion hormone and adipokinetic hormone.

The polydnavirus disallows these proteins from being released into the nervous system, instead causing them to accumulate in neurosecretory cells. Specifically with PTTH, due to the accumulation, is not released in sufficient amounts to stimulate the synthesis of ecdysteroids by the prothoracic glands, which will prevent subsequent development of the larvae. These hormones also allow the parasitized larva to survive longer without food or water, due to a slowdown of diuresis (urine production) and gut purge. This would help the larva to conserve water. Starved larvae can also ultimately molt and pupate if they are large enough, but this can be explained by the temporal difference in the beginning of accumulation. The mechanism behind neuropeptide accumulation is unknown. The polydnavirus is not the only factor affecting development of the host; teratocytes will have a similar effect, and it is likely that a large combination of different factors is needed to replicate the biological effects of parasitization.

Another extremely important effect of the virus is the suppression of the immune system of the host. This is accomplished by altering the behavior of host hemocytes, including inducing apoptosis. Within 24 hours of oviposition, the host is unable to encapsulate any antigen which enters its body, preventing it from attacking the wasp larvae.

Over a period of several days, the immune system will make a partial recovery. In experiments, its ability to encapsulate a harmless artificial stimuli had returned to near-normal after 8 days. After 10 days hemocyte functioning against injected E. coli bacteria had fully recovered. However, aspects of the immune system not involved in the initial response do not recover to the same extent. Parasitized caterpillars 10 days after oviposition were observed to suffer far higher mortality from the Pseudomonas aeruginosa bacterium than nonparasitized caterpillars, and had only very slight improvements in their immune response compared to caterpillars 1 hour post-oviposition.

Despite the immune system's partial recovery, by the 8-day point the wasp larvae have developed a resistance to the immune system by some other means. From an evolutionary standpoint, it is beneficial for the wasp larva that the host should recover its resistance to external pathogens without regaining the ability to destroy the parasite.

Larvae which have reached 8 days old can survive and eclose when transplanted into a new host which has not been exposed to the virus, although their chances of survival are significantly reduced. In experiments, 50% of the host larvae successfully encapsulated all of the parasitoids, and the mortality rate of wasp larvae in the remaining hosts varied significantly.

The wasp also injects venom along with the eggs and virus particles. The venom on its own will have a negligible effect on the host, but will enhance the effects of the virus when both are present.

=== Changed effects resulting from surgical alteration to the parasitized host ===
Researchers were able to counter the decline in locomotion by surgically removing the host's supraesophageal ganglion (brain) during day 4 of the fifth instar, prior to parasite emergence. After the parasites emerged, the surgically altered host moved about almost continuously, very similar to its "wandering" phase. However, this was not a restoration of the wandering phase, since during a genuine wandering phase the brain is necessary for locomotor activity. This surgery rendered the caterpillar unable to feed, so it is not known whether its drive to do so was also restored.

== Genetic description of the virus ==
The Cotesia congregata bracovirus has one of the largest genomes known of any virus (567,670 base pairs), and is largely composed of introns, which is rare for a virus; 70% of the DNA is noncoding. The genome is arranged in 30 circles of DNA, which range in size from 5,000 to 40,000 base pairs. Of the 30, 29 circles code for at least one protein product. The genome is composed of 66% A-T residues. The top gene products are:

- PTP proteins (protein tyrosine phosphatases), which will dephosphorylate tyrosine AA's on regulatory proteins. The PTP will interfere with certain cytoskeleton dynamics, which would be helpful in avoiding encapsulation. The PTPs found are more closely related to cellular PTPs than those found in viruses.
- The second group of proteins are ank proteins, those with ankyrin repeat motifs. These are known to inhibit immune responses in vertebrates.
- The third group of proteins are cysteine-rich proteins, are extremely similar to proteins excreted by the wasp teratocytes. These are suspected to inhibit translation of storage proteins such as arylphorin, which would leave more resources free for the parasite larvae.
- The fourth group are cystatin proteins, which will inhibit cysteine proteases. These will inhibit the breakdown of the proteins in group 3. Cystatins are not a gene product previously found in viruses to date. They also likely have an immuno-suppressive function, based on similar proteins which have been found in parasitic nematodes.

The rest of the protein products have no known homologs and their function is not known. Much of what has been discovered makes it difficult to place the virus in a phylogenetic niche. The most closely related viruses are the nudiviruses and their baculovirus relatives, although this relatedness goes back approximately 75 million years.
