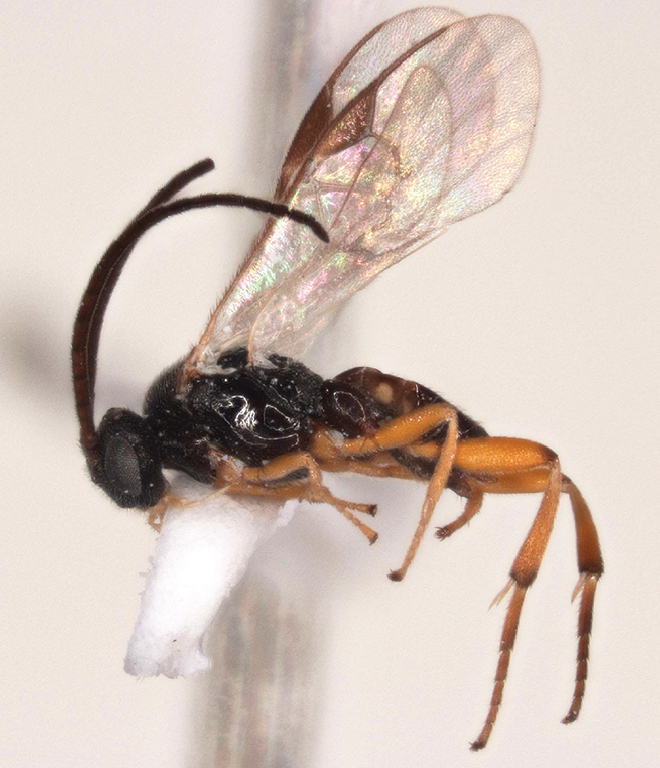

Scientific classification
- Domain: Eukaryota
- Kingdom: Animalia
- Phylum: Arthropoda
- Class: Insecta
- Order: Hymenoptera
- Family: Braconidae
- Genus: Cotesia
- Species: C. nuellorum

Binomial name
- Cotesia nuellorum Whitfield, 2018

= Cotesia nuellorum =

Species of wasp

Cotesia nuellorum is a species of wasp in the genus Cotesia first described by Whitfield in 2018. It is found in the US state of Texas.

The body of the female is mostly dark except for the palps. Antennae scape is black. Pedicel dark brown and flagellum dark brown to black. Body length is 2.0–2.2 mm. Male is similar to female in color, but with slightly darker legs. Generally, the male is smaller than the female. Two hosts are recorded: Citheronia regalis and Actias luna.
