= Cotesia vestalis =

Scientific classification
- Domain: Eukaryota
- Kingdom: Animalia
- Phylum: Arthropoda
- Class: Insecta
- Order: Hymenoptera
- Family: Braconidae
- Genus: Cotesia
- Species: C. vestalis

Binomial name
- Cotesia vestalis (Haliday, 1834)

Synonyms
- Cotesia plutellae (Kurdjumov, 1912)

Parasitoid wasp of a cabbage worm

Cotesia vestalis is a parasitoid wasp that appears to be able to detect volatile organic compounds emitted by the plant Brassica oleracea in response to herbivore damage, such as would be caused (for example) by heavy infestation with the wasp's host caterpillar Plutella xylostella.

== Diseases ==
Cotesia vestalis suffers from a polydnavirus, Cotesia vestalis bracovirus.
