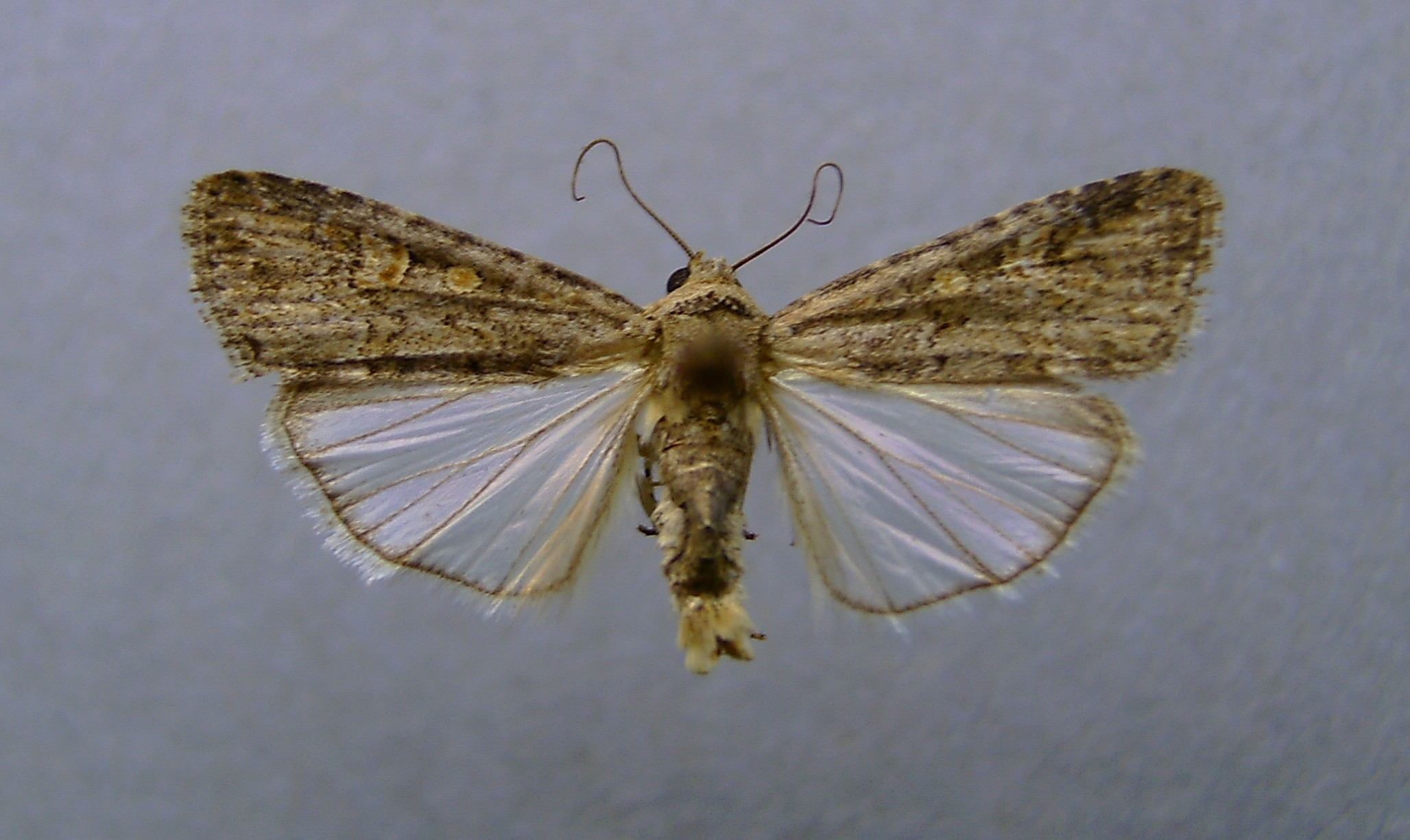

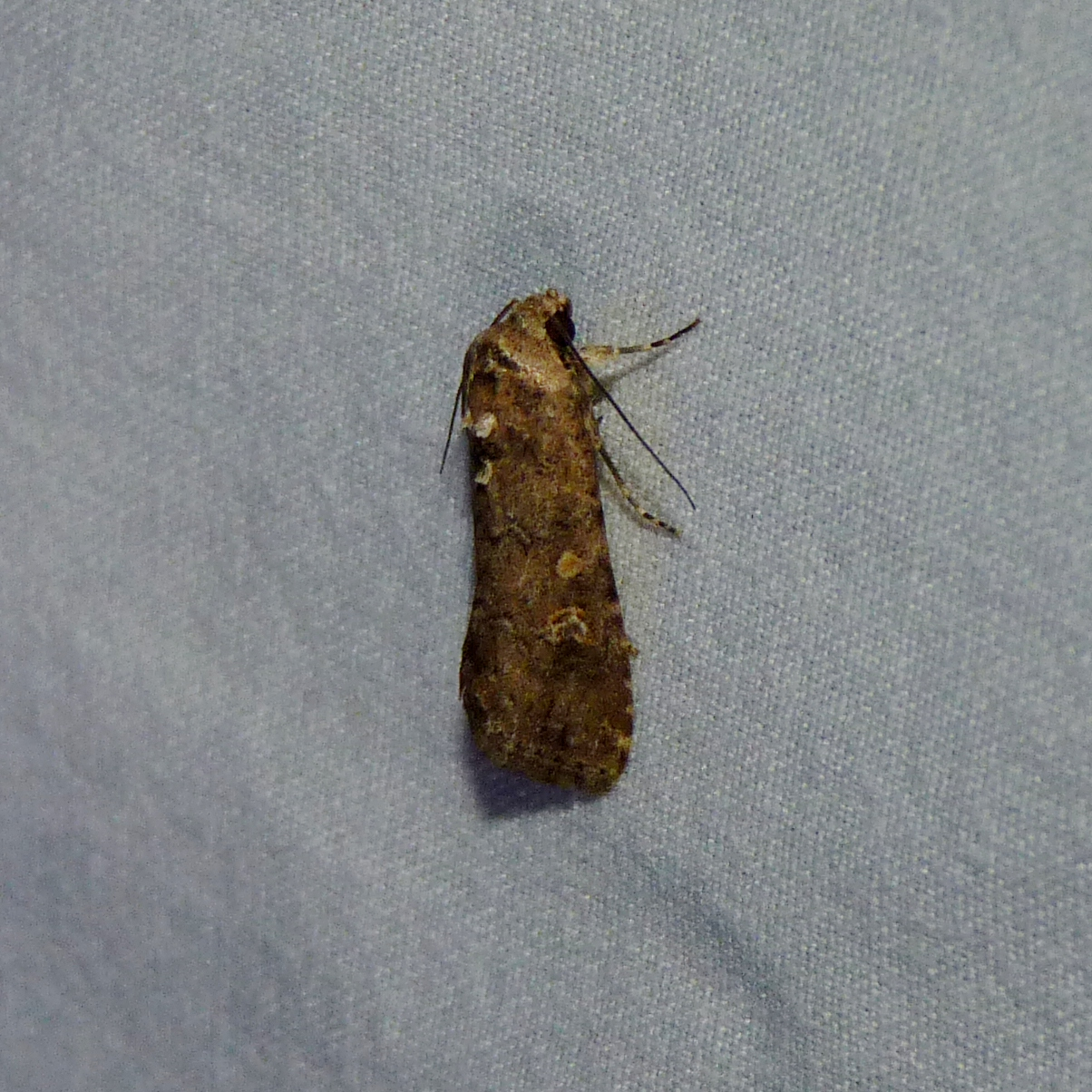

Scientific classification
- Kingdom: Animalia
- Phylum: Arthropoda
- Clade: Pancrustacea
- Class: Insecta
- Order: Lepidoptera
- Superfamily: Noctuoidea
- Family: Noctuidae
- Genus: Spodoptera
- Species: S. exigua

Binomial name
- Spodoptera exigua (Hübner, 1808)

Synonyms
- Noctua exigua Hubner, 1808; Caradrina venosa Butler, 1880; Laphygma exigua

= Beet armyworm =

Species of moth

The beet armyworm or small mottled willow moth (Spodoptera exigua) is one of the best-known agricultural pest insects. It is also known as the asparagus fern caterpillar. It is native to Asia, but has been introduced worldwide and is now found almost anywhere its many host crops are grown. The voracious larvae are the main culprits. In the British Isles, where it is an introduced species and not known to breed, the adult moth is known as the small mottled willow moth.

== Discovery ==
Thought to have originated in south-east Asian countries, it was first discovered in North America about 1876, when it was found in Oregon, and it reached Florida in 1924.

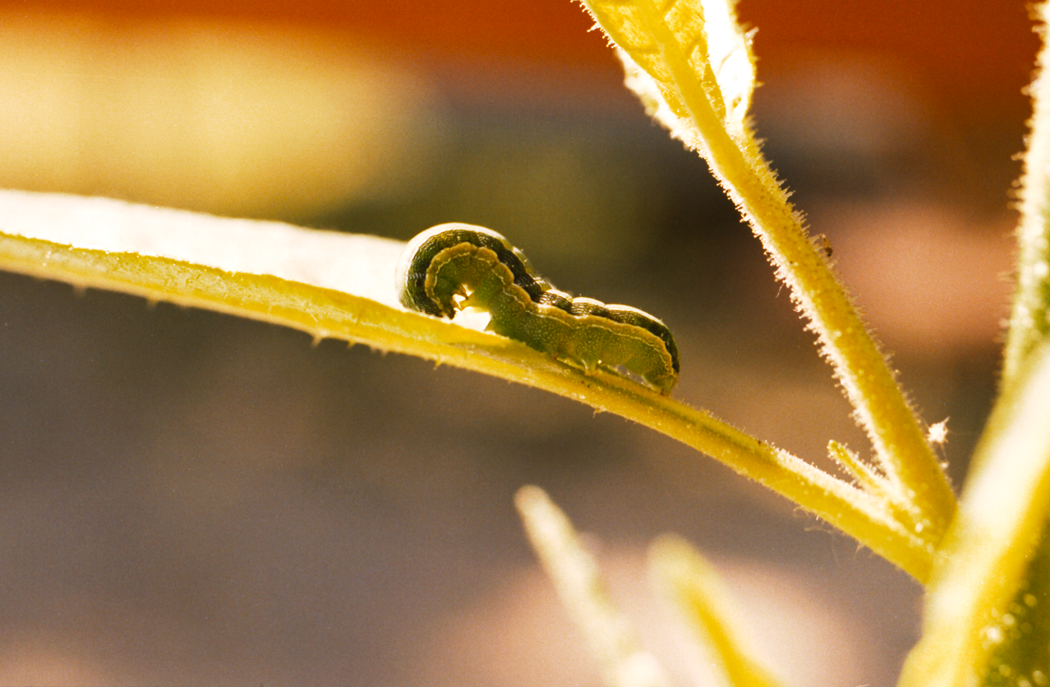
Larva

== Description ==
The adult is a drab brown or grey moth with a wingspan of 26–32 millimetres (1–1 1/4 in). Forewing is greyish ochreous in color, washed with dull yellow and sprinkled with black scales. Inner and outer lines are double, indistinct, filled in with pale yellowish color. A dark waved median shade visible before lower half of outer line. Cell is dark brown. Orbicular stigma is pale or bright yellow, and round, whereas reniform has a curved brown lunule in centre. The submarginal line is pale grey. There is the darker shade preceding it with dark streaks between the veins. Terminal spots are black. Hindwings semihyaline are white, with the veins dark brown. All three margins are shaded with fuscous color.

Larvae are pinkish brown, clotted with black. Spiracular line pale ochreous, with dark upper edge. They are greenish-brown cutworms, soft and bulging caterpillars with dark longitudinal stripes.

== Damage ==
The larvae feed on the foliage and fruits of plants, and can completely defoliate small ones. Smaller larvae devour the parenchyma of leaves, so all that remains is the thin epidermis and veins. Larger larvae tend to burrow holes through thick areas of plants. For example, they will burrow straight into a head of lettuce rather than neatly removing tissue from one particular leaf, rendering the produce unmarketable. Larvae also attack buds and new growth on plants, preventing flowers from opening, new leaves from sprouting, and vegetables from developing. As the smaller larvae move about they leave strands of silk behind, netting the leaves with a silvery film.

Illustration

== Ecology ==
The wide host range of the beet armyworm includes asparagus, beans and peas, sugar and table beets, celery, cole crops, lettuce, potato, tomato, cotton, cereals, oilseeds, tobacco, cannabis, many flowers, and a multitude of weed species. The beet armyworm does not tolerate cold. It can overwinter in warm areas, such as Florida and Hawaii, but in colder areas, it dies off during the winter and the region is reinvaded by the adult moth as the weather warms and crop plants sprout.

== Control ==
Pheromone traps and mechanical hand picking of adults and caterpillars are extensively used. Parasitoids such as Chelonus insularis, Cotesia marginiventris, Meteorus autographae, Lespesia archippivora lay eggs on the caterpillars, and their larvae feed and emerge. Predators like Orius sp., Geocoris sp., Nabis sp., Podisus maculiventris are also effective controlling measures. Pupal stages can be eliminated by introducing Solenopsis invicta to the field.

Apart from biological control, many chemical pesticides are extensively used. Larvae are susceptible to neem products. Eggs can be killed by using petroleum oil concentrations. Applying cottonseed oil to leaves can eliminate both eggs and larvae.

== See also ==
- African armyworm (Spodoptera exempta)
