= Cotesia =

- Male C. congregata courting an immobilized female (slow motion)
- Male C. congregata courtship song

Scientific classification
- Kingdom: Animalia
- Phylum: Arthropoda
- Class: Insecta
- Order: Hymenoptera
- Family: Braconidae
- Subfamily: Microgastrinae
- Genus: Cotesia; Cameron, 1891

Diversity
- more than 300 species

Genus of wasps

Cotesia is a genus of braconid wasps first described by Peter Cameron in 1891 and named in honour of E. C. Cotes. Some species parasitize caterpillars of species considered pests, and are used as biocontrol agents. Cotesia congregata parasitizes the tomato and the tobacco hornworms. C. glomerata and C. rubecula feed on the cabbage white and other white butterfly caterpillars. C. gonopterygis and C. risilis are host-specific and parasitize the common brimstone.

The wasp C. melanoscelus parasitizes the caterpillar of the spongy moth. It, and the spongy moth, are native to Europe. The spongy moth is an invasive species in North America, and C. melanoscelus has been imported as a biocontrol of the moth. Cotesia icipe is a parasitoid of Spodoptera littoralis and beet armyworm (Spodoptera exigua) which are pests of amaranth crops.

== Species ==
List of Cotesia species

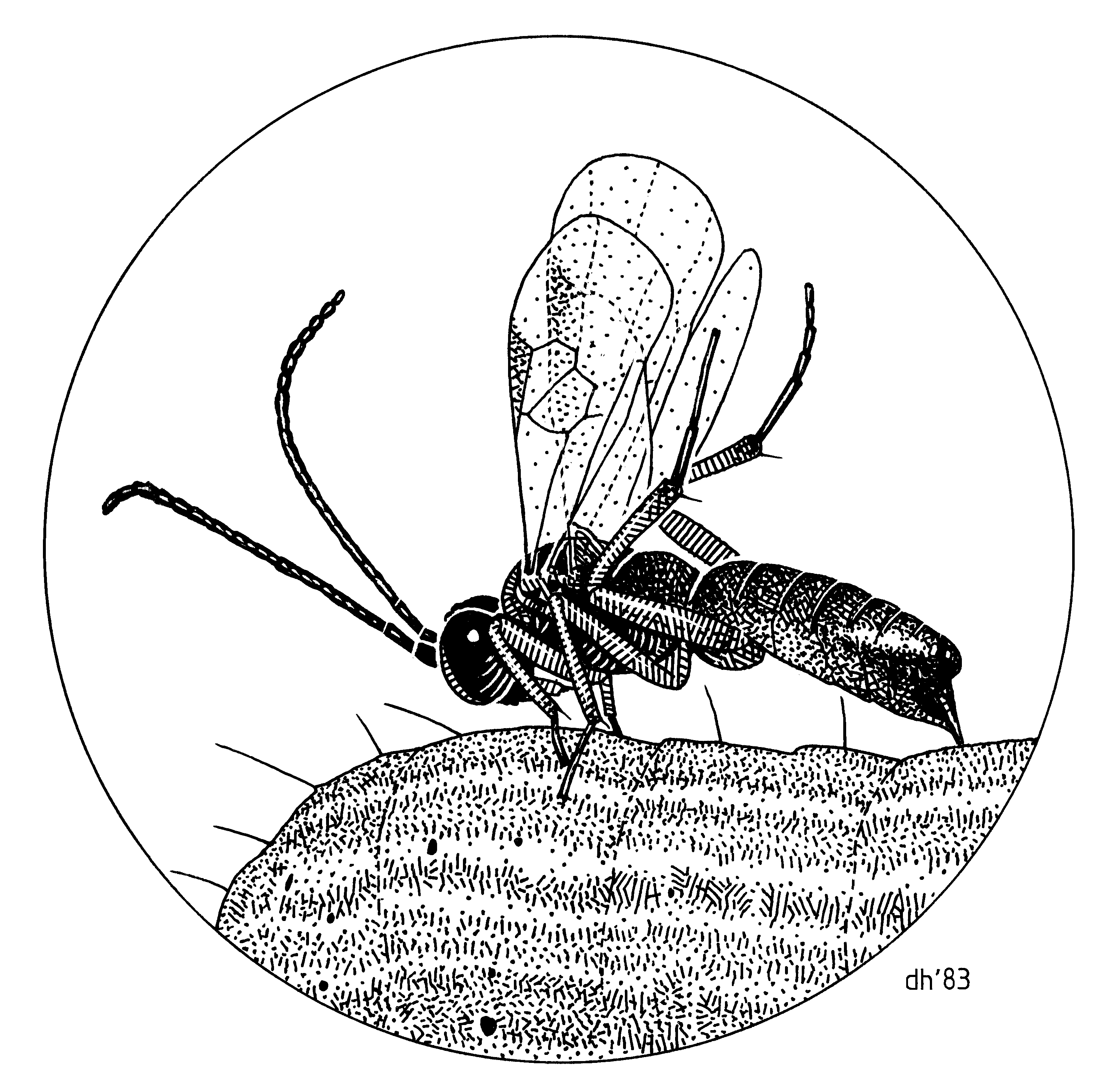
Cotesia ruficrus illustrated by Des Helmore

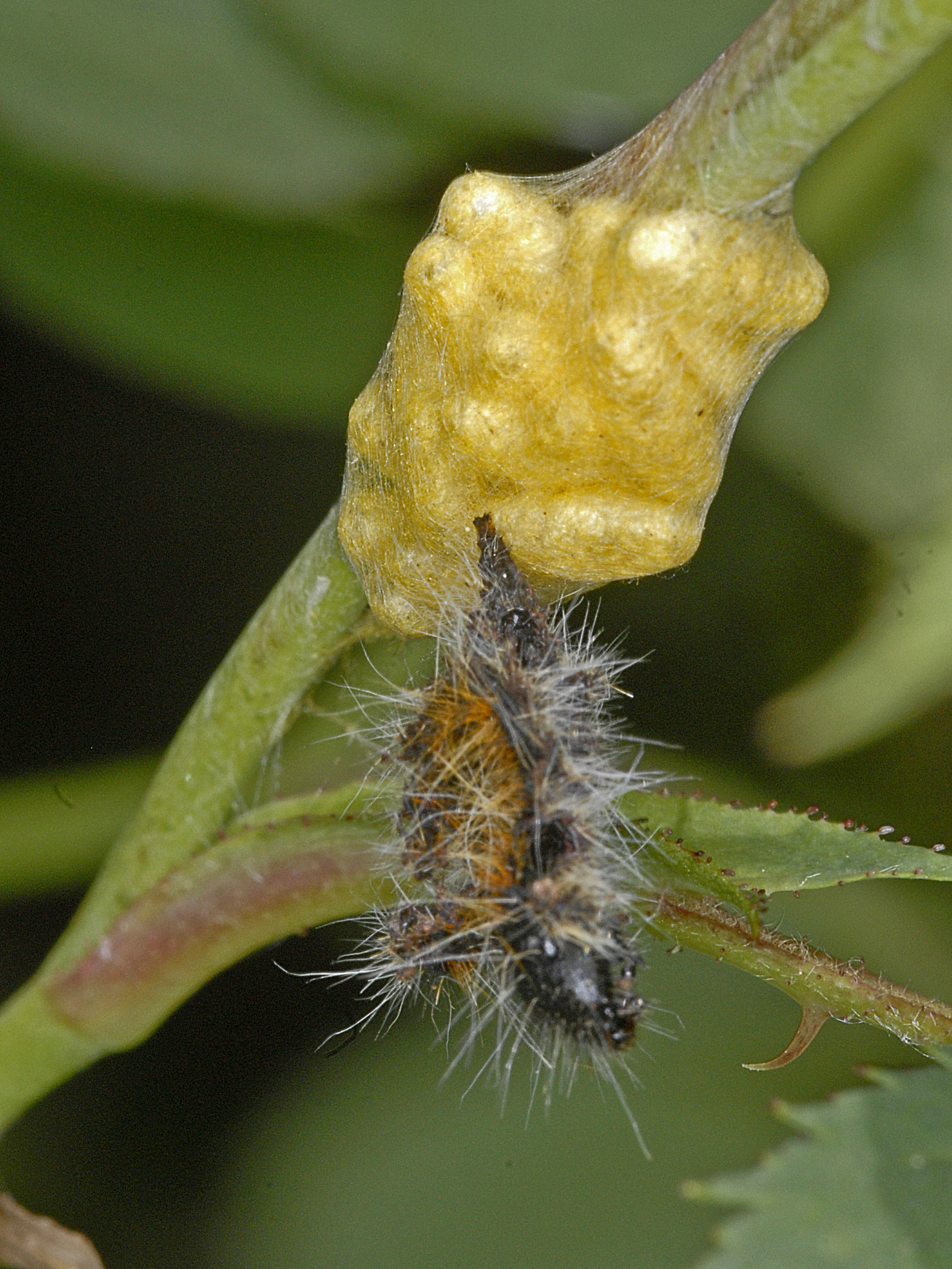
Cotesia sp. cocoons

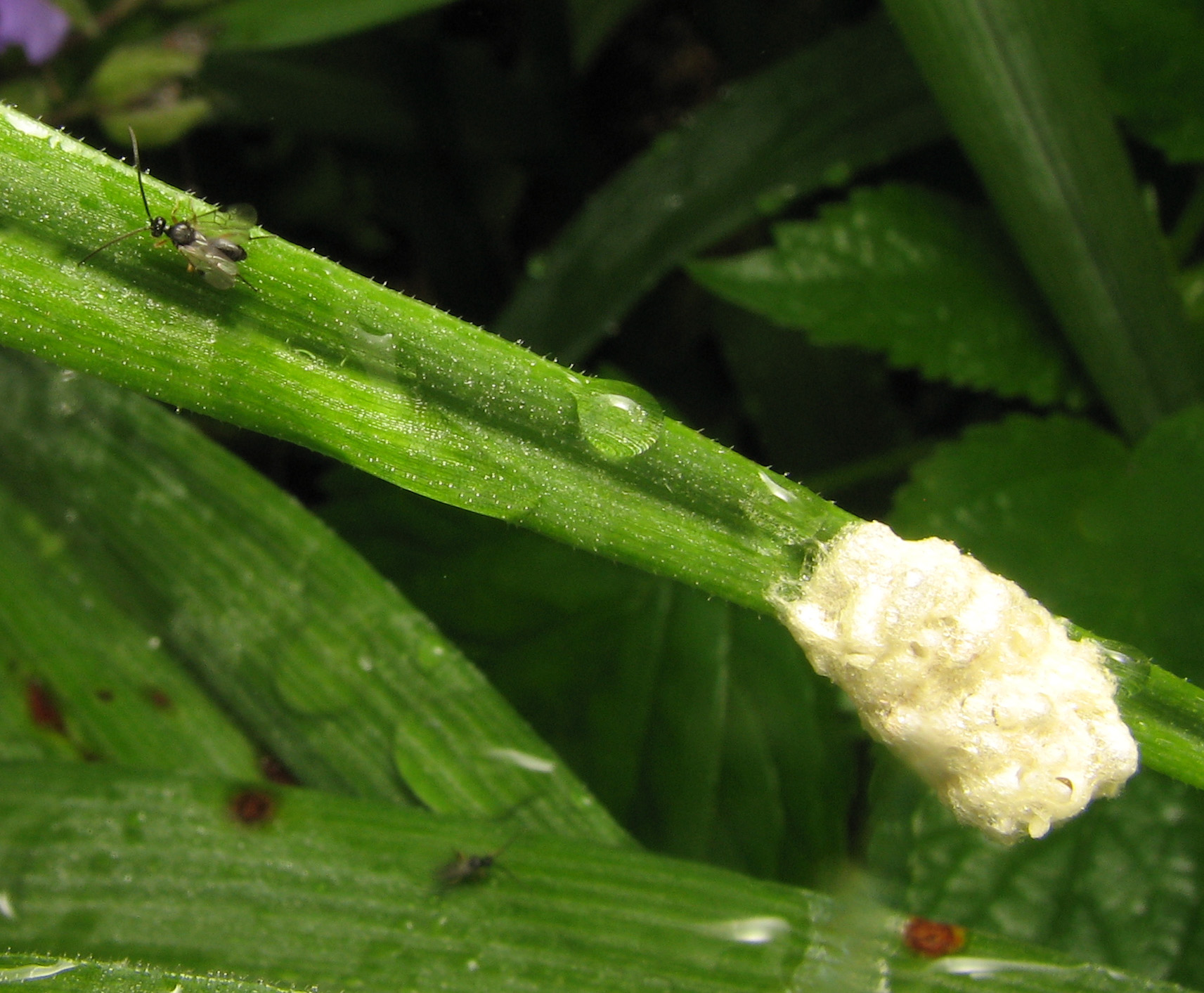
Cotesia sp. cocoons

== See also ==
- List of Cotesia species
