= Cotesia rubecula =

Scientific classification
- Kingdom: Animalia
- Phylum: Arthropoda
- Clade: Pancrustacea
- Class: Insecta
- Order: Hymenoptera
- Family: Braconidae
- Genus: Cotesia
- Species: C. rubecula

Binomial name
- Cotesia rubecula (Marshall, 1885)

Synonyms
- Apanteles rubecula Marshall, 1885

Species of wasp

Cotesia rubecula is a parasitoid wasp from the large wasp family Braconidae.

== Description ==
Black in adulthood with a body less than 1/4 of an inch long, C. rubecula has long, extending antenna about the same size as its body.

== Distribution and habitat ==
Cotesia rubecula is not common, established in only a few areas of the world. Originally native to China, the parasite has been introduced as biological pest control in North America, specifically in New England. The population dies down during winter months with a population bubble in late summer related to the growth of its host species.

== Reproduction and lifecycle ==
The mating system of C. rubecula is polygynous. Mate-guarding, a process in which a member of a species prevents another member of the same species from mating with their partner, is seen in C. rubecula. Males are attracted to females through pheromones and they induce females to mate through vibrations, to which the female responds by assuming a specific position. When a male who has copulated with a female sees another male trying to court her, he will often adopt the female receptive position. Post-copulatory female mimicry by the male offers an advantage by acting as a mate-guarding mechanism. If a second male arrives soon enough after the female copulates with the first male, the second male may be able to induce a second copulation which will compete with the first one. However, if the first male who copulated with her mimics the female, it distracts the second male long enough that the female becomes unreceptive.

Cotesia rubecula parasitizes the cabbage worm caterpillar, generally in the stage of first instar, with the female wasp stinging and laying between 20 and 50 eggs within the host instar. The defense mechanism of the caterpillars can sometimes kill the eggs. If they do not, the caterpillar does not die until the larvae of the wasp emerge. The impact on the host population can vary greatly, from a small percentage to up to 75% of the caterpillars in a given habitat.
