= Cotesia marginiventris =

Scientific classification
- Domain: Eukaryota
- Kingdom: Animalia
- Phylum: Arthropoda
- Class: Insecta
- Order: Hymenoptera
- Family: Braconidae
- Genus: Cotesia
- Species: C. marginiventris

Binomial name
- Cotesia marginiventris Cresson 1865

Synonyms
- Apanteles marginiventris

Species of wasp

Cotesia marginiventris is a species of parasitoid wasp that develops in Noctuidae caterpillars. It can be found in the Americas. The wasp finds caterpillar hosts to rear its young in by detecting the volatiles produced by the plants that the herbivorous caterpillars feed on.
