= Allatostatin =

Hormones in insects and crustaceans

Allatostatins are neuropeptide hormones in insects and crustacea. They have a twofold function: they both inhibit the generation of juvenile hormone and reduce their food intake. They are therefore putative targets for insecticide research.

== Types ==
There are three distinct Allatostatin types: A, B, and C. Allatostatin C's have 3 subtypes as a result of gene multiplication: C, CC, and CCC. Each Allatostatin type has a unique evolutionary history resulting in distinct conservation and functions across the animal kingdom. Although originally identified in different insects, all three type are found in Drosophila (needs source).

=== Allatostatin A ===
Allatostatin A (AstA) peptides are found in all arthropods and contain a C-terminus Y/FXFGLamide. In Drosophila, there are 4 AstA peptides (AstA-1, AstA-2, AstA-3, AstA-4) and 2 AstA receptors (AstA-R1 and AstA-R2). The AstA receptor is a GIRK1 channel and is homologous to the mammalian galanin receptor

== Control of food intake ==
Allatostatin is found in the cells in a small neuronal cluster, the frontal ganglion. It is also present in the axons which leave the frontal ganglion and run across the surface of the gut. Application of low concentrations of Allatostatin inhibit the spontaneous contractions of the gut. All three forms of Allatostatin appear to inhibit gut motility in all the insects which have been tested.

== Interaction with juvenile hormone ==
Juvenile hormone is synthesised in the corpora allata. In every insect tested, at least one of the three types of Allatostatin inhibits the biosynthesis of juvenile hormone. This is achieved by paracrine release of Allatostatin from neurons in the brain which terminate in the corpora allata. The signal is transduced by GPCR receptors, but the intracellular pathway is not yet known. Other amine and neuropeptide neurotransmitters may also inhibit juvenile hormone biosynthesis.
