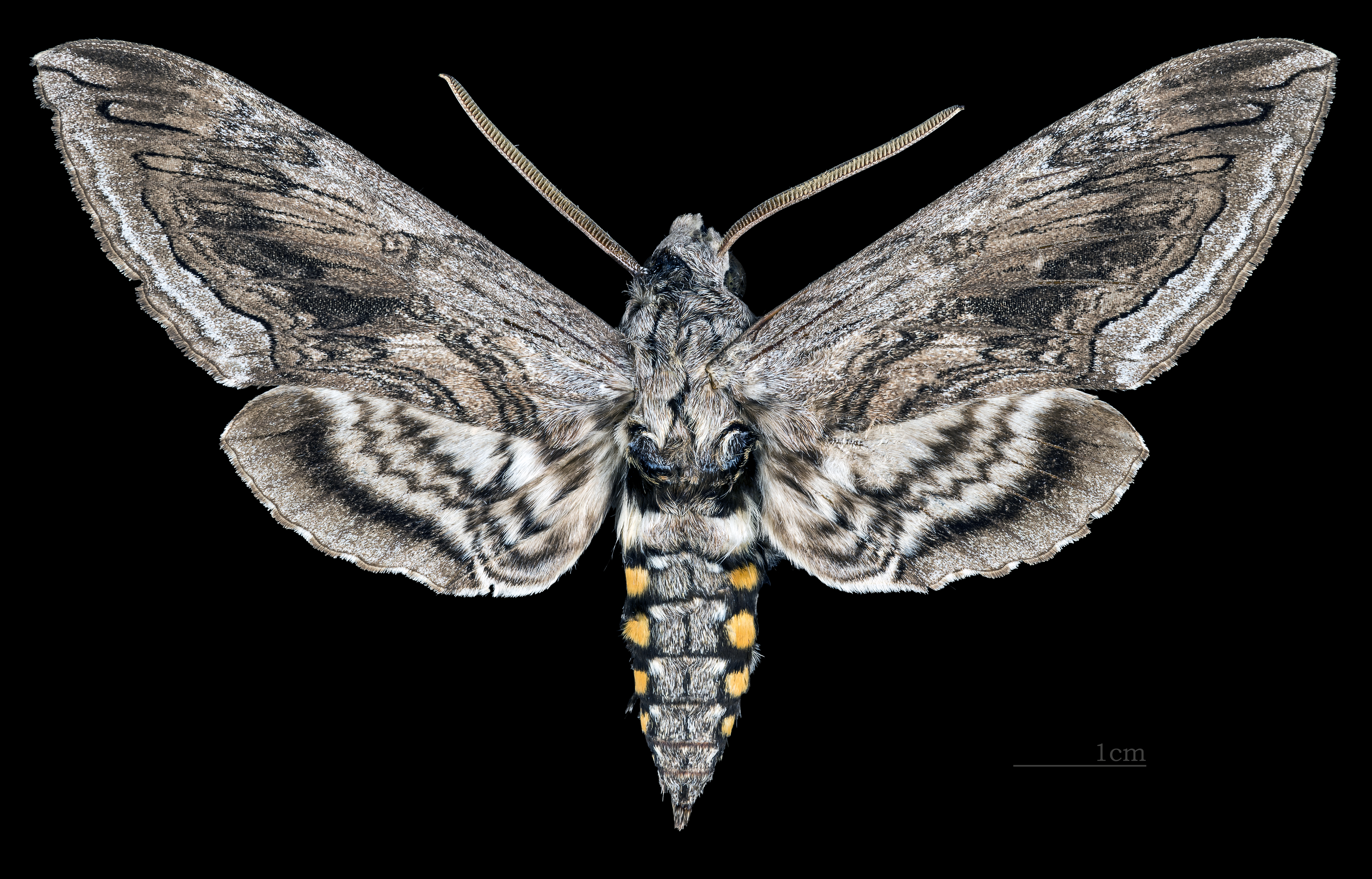
- Male - dorsal view
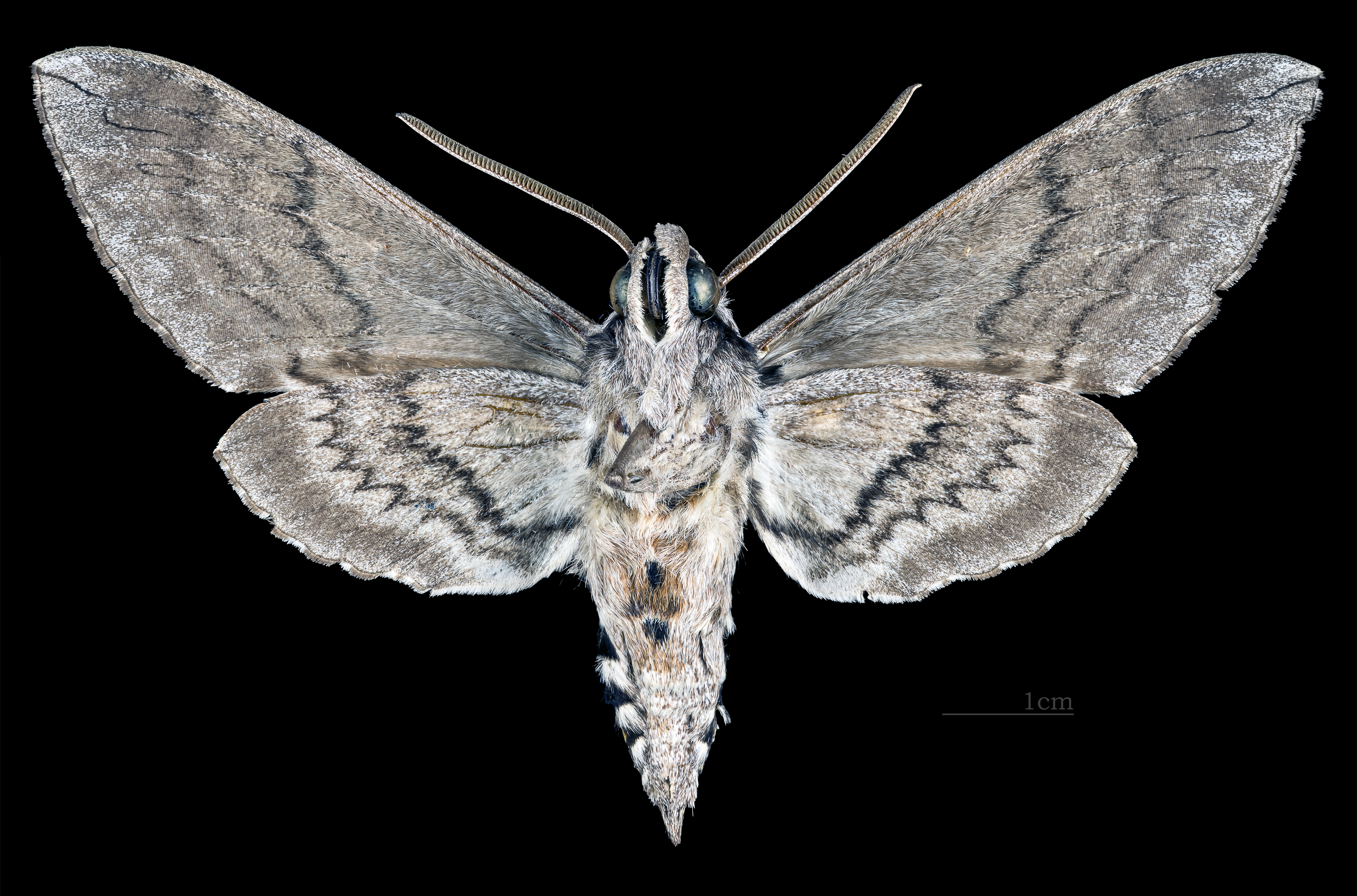
- Male - ventral view

Scientific classification
- Kingdom: Animalia
- Phylum: Arthropoda
- Clade: Pancrustacea
- Class: Insecta
- Order: Lepidoptera
- Family: Sphingidae
- Genus: Manduca
- Species: M. quinquemaculata

Binomial name
- Manduca quinquemaculata (Haworth, 1803)

Synonyms
- Sphinx 5-maculatus Haworth, 1803; Phlegethontius quinquemaculatus; Protoparce quinquemaculatus; Phlegethontius celeus Hübner, 1821; Protoparce quinquemaculatus wirti Schaus, 1927

= Manduca quinquemaculata =

Species of moth

Manduca quinquemaculata, the five-spotted hawkmoth, is a brown and gray hawk moth of the family Sphingidae. The caterpillar, often referred to as the tomato hornworm, can be a major pest in gardens; they get their name from a dark projection on their posterior end and their use of tomatoes as host plants. Tomato hornworms are closely related to (and sometimes confused with) the tobacco hornworm Manduca sexta and Blackburn's sphinx moth Manduca blackburni. This confusion arises because caterpillars of both species have similar morphologies and feed on the foliage of various plants from the family Solanaceae, so either species can be found on tobacco or tomato leaves. Because of this, the plant on which the caterpillar is found does not indicate its species.

== Range ==
M. quinquemaculata is found across North America and Australia. The tobacco hornworm, a close relative of the tomato hornworm, tends to dominate the south while tomato hornworms are more prevalent in the northern United States.

== Food plants ==
=== Larva ===
Tomato hornworms are known to eat various plants from the family Solanaceae, commonly feeding on tomato, eggplant, pepper, tobacco, moonflowers and potato. Females prefer to oviposit on young leaves near the stem of host plants, and early instar caterpillars can often be found there during the day. In the evening or early morning when sunlight is less direct, the caterpillars will feed on more distal leaves.

=== Adult ===
==== Adult diet ====
Adults feed on nectar from flowering plants including Datura meteloides, Oenothera caespitosa, and Mirabilis multiflora. Most of the food plants they target have large, fragrant white flowers.

==== Interactions with host plants ====
Hawkmoths, including M. quinquemaculata, are the primary pollinators of D. meteloides. The length of the moth's proboscis (around 10 cm), which is an elongated, tubular mouthpart used for sucking and feeding, is well-suited for retrieving nectar from the flowers. Aside from being a host plant for M. quinquemaculata, D. meteloides has also been used by humans for its psychoactive effects. D. meteloides contains tropane alkaloids, which are present throughout the plant including in the flowers. These alkaloids have an intoxicating effect on the moth, which displays erratic flight patterns as well as uncoordinated, and often unsuccessful, landing attempts after consuming the nectar. Despite the impairment the nectar causes, the moths have been observed returning to the flowers and consuming more nectar. It has been hypothesized that the "spiked" nectar offers the moths reward beyond just nutrients.

Both Mirabilis multiflora and Oenothera caespitosa are also dependent on hawkmoths for pollination. M. quinquemaculata has been found to feed from Oenothera caespitosa first and only later to visit Mirabilis multiflora, indicating a preference for the former.

== Life cycle ==
=== Oviposition ===
Females lay eggs singly on the surface of host plant leaves in late spring. Larvae hatch after approximately one week. The female decides where to lay eggs based on an assessment of the risk of predation her offspring will face. On the tobacco plant Nicotiana attenuata, young leaves close to a plant's stem are more protected from predators and larvae that grow there gain more mass than larvae grown elsewhere on the plant; females prefer to oviposit, or lay their eggs, on these leaves. Eggs are large and range in color from pale green to off-white.

=== Larva ===
M. quinquemaculata larvae are large green caterpillars reaching a length of up to 10 cm (3.9 inches) when fully grown. The caterpillars have a dark, pointed projection on their rear end that earns them the name "hornworm". Although the tomato hornworm, M. quinquemaculata, can be confused with the tobacco hornworm, M. sexta, the larvae of these species can be distinguished by their lateral markings: tomato hornworms have eight V-shaped white markings with no borders and dark blue or black horns, while tobacco hornworms have seven white diagonal lines with a black border and red horns.

Caterpillars hatch in late spring to early summer. They develop through five instars to reach maturity. In warmer climates where the first generation emerges earlier in the year, two generations of caterpillars can coexist in a single summer. Once fully grown, caterpillars fall from their host plants to pupate.

=== Pupa ===
Caterpillars pupate in early fall, which means they enter a stage of their life cycle where they become a pupa and undergo transformation into a moth. After pupation, M. quinquemaculata overwinter in the soil near their host plants, with adults emerging the following summer.

=== Adults ===
Adults are large, with a wingspan of up to 13 centimetres (5.1 in). The wings of the moth are brown and gray with large mottled front wings and smaller hindwings with light and dark zig-zag patterned bands. The abdomens are brown and white with a row of five yellow spots down each side, giving them the name "five-spotted hawkmoth". The moths of M. quinquemaculata and M. sexta can be distinguished by the number of spots on their abdomens.

Shortly after adults emerge from the soil, they mate and females lay their eggs on host plants, renewing the life cycle.

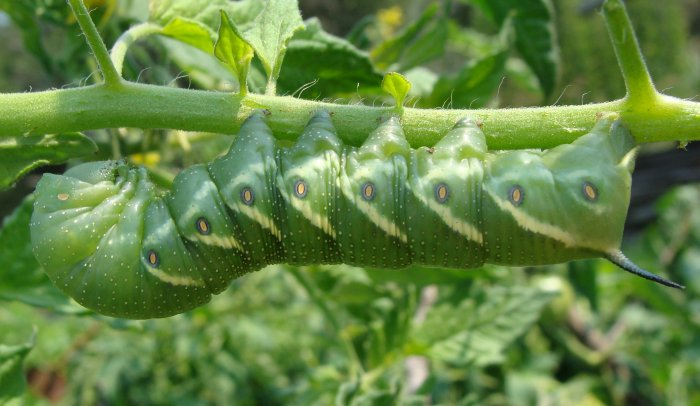
Tomato hornworm larva

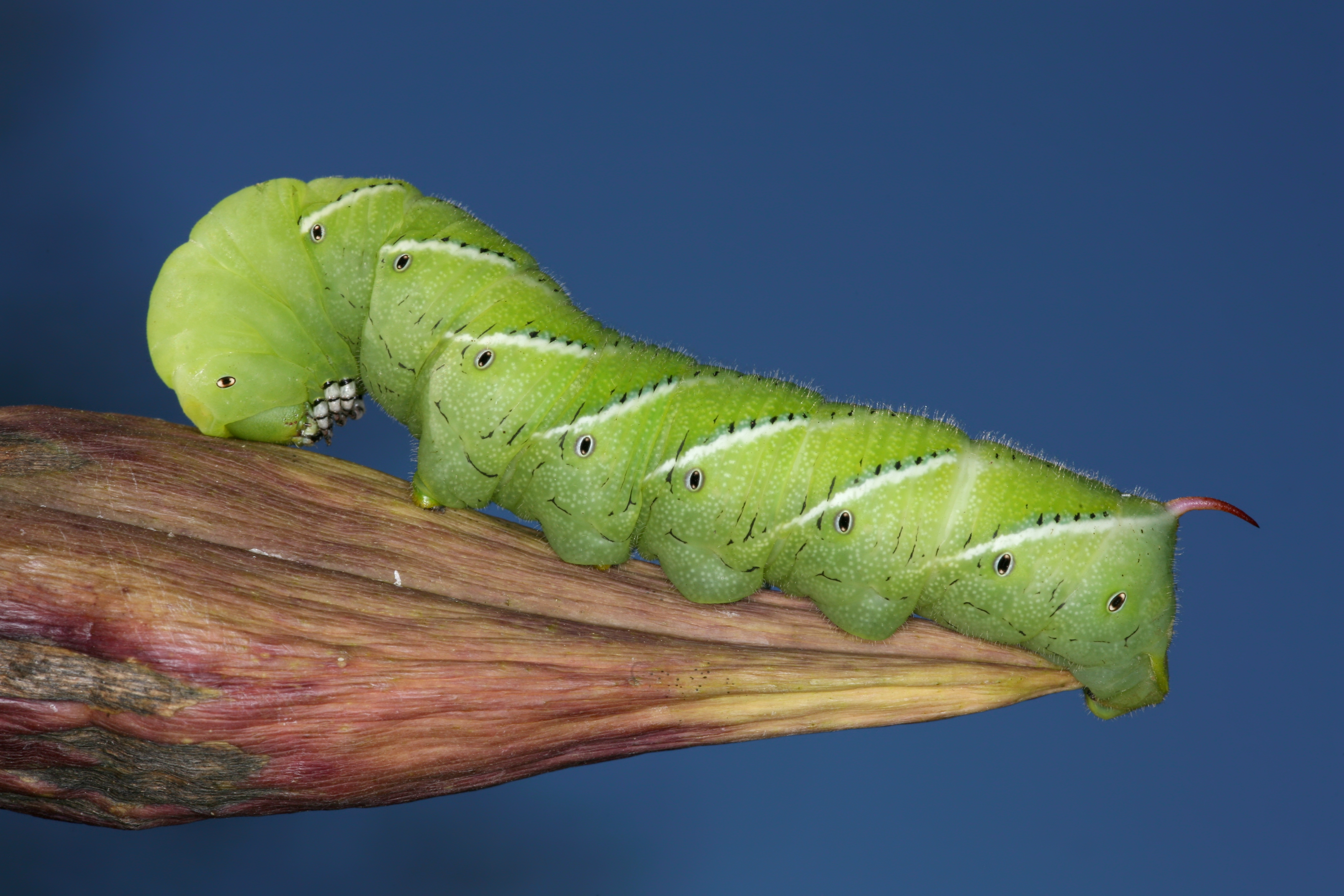
Closely related tobacco hornworm; note the red horn and lack of V-shaped white markings

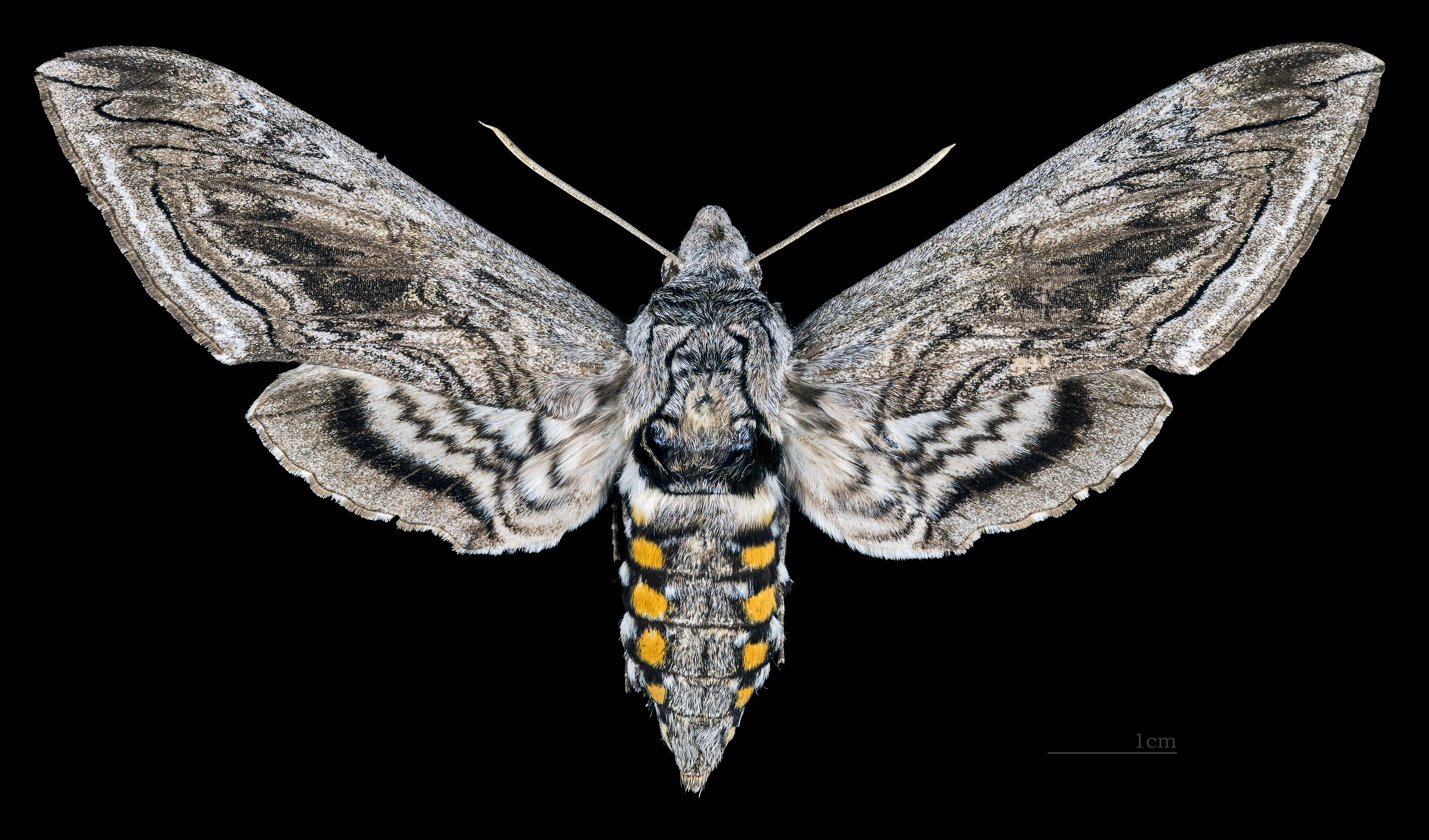
Female – dorsal view

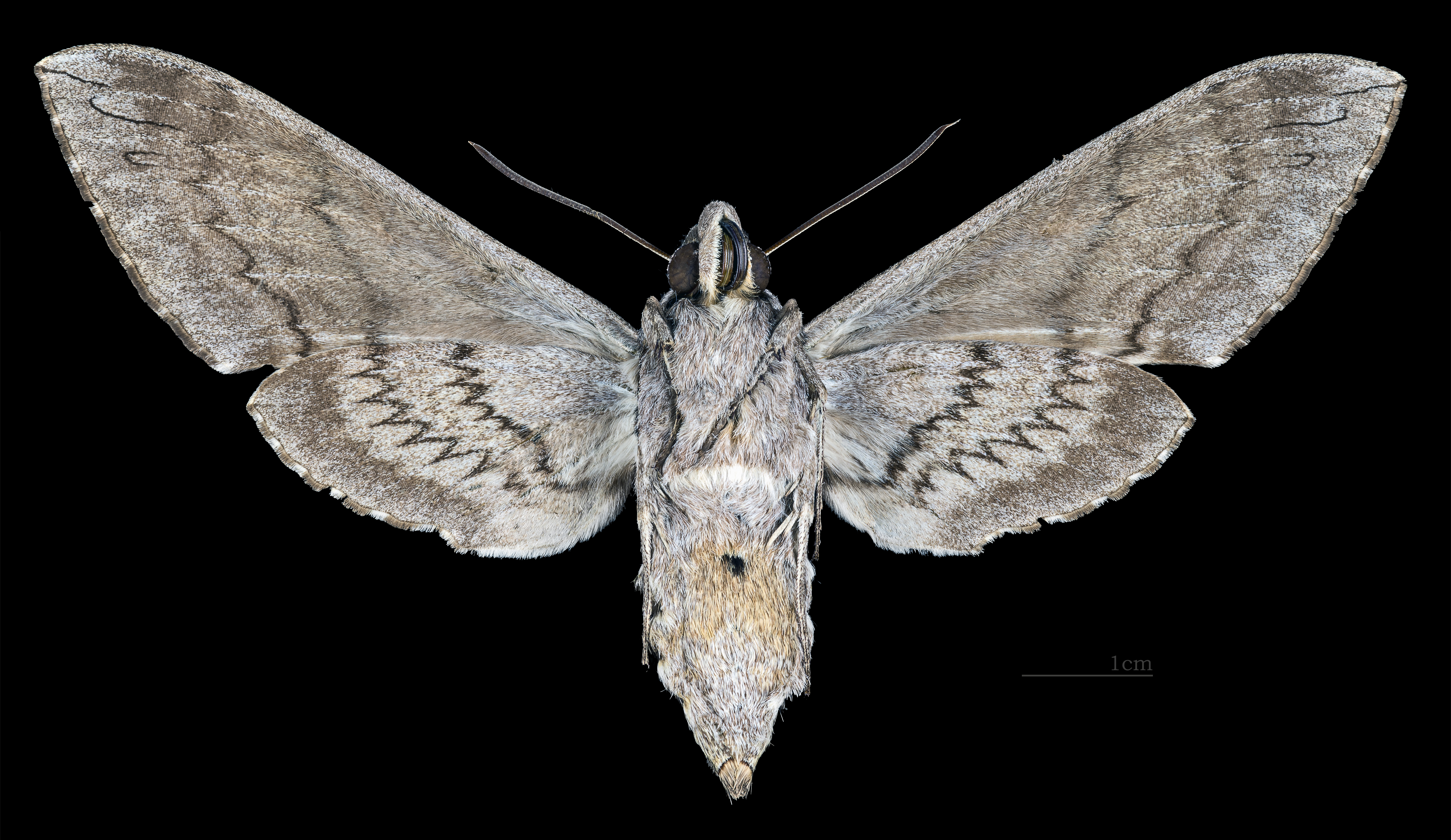
Female – ventral view

== Relationship with M. sexta ==
M. quinquemaculata and M. sexta are both large hawkmoths of the genus Manduca. The two species have similar appearances in both larvae and adults and share common food sources, including tobacco. Past research, observing that the two species are similar, referred to the two as sister species. However, a recent phylogenetic analysis from Kawahara et al. (2013) found that the two species, though closely related, are not sister species. The authors tracked the ancestral origin of both species to Central America, where the two species diverged from one another.

== Pest control ==
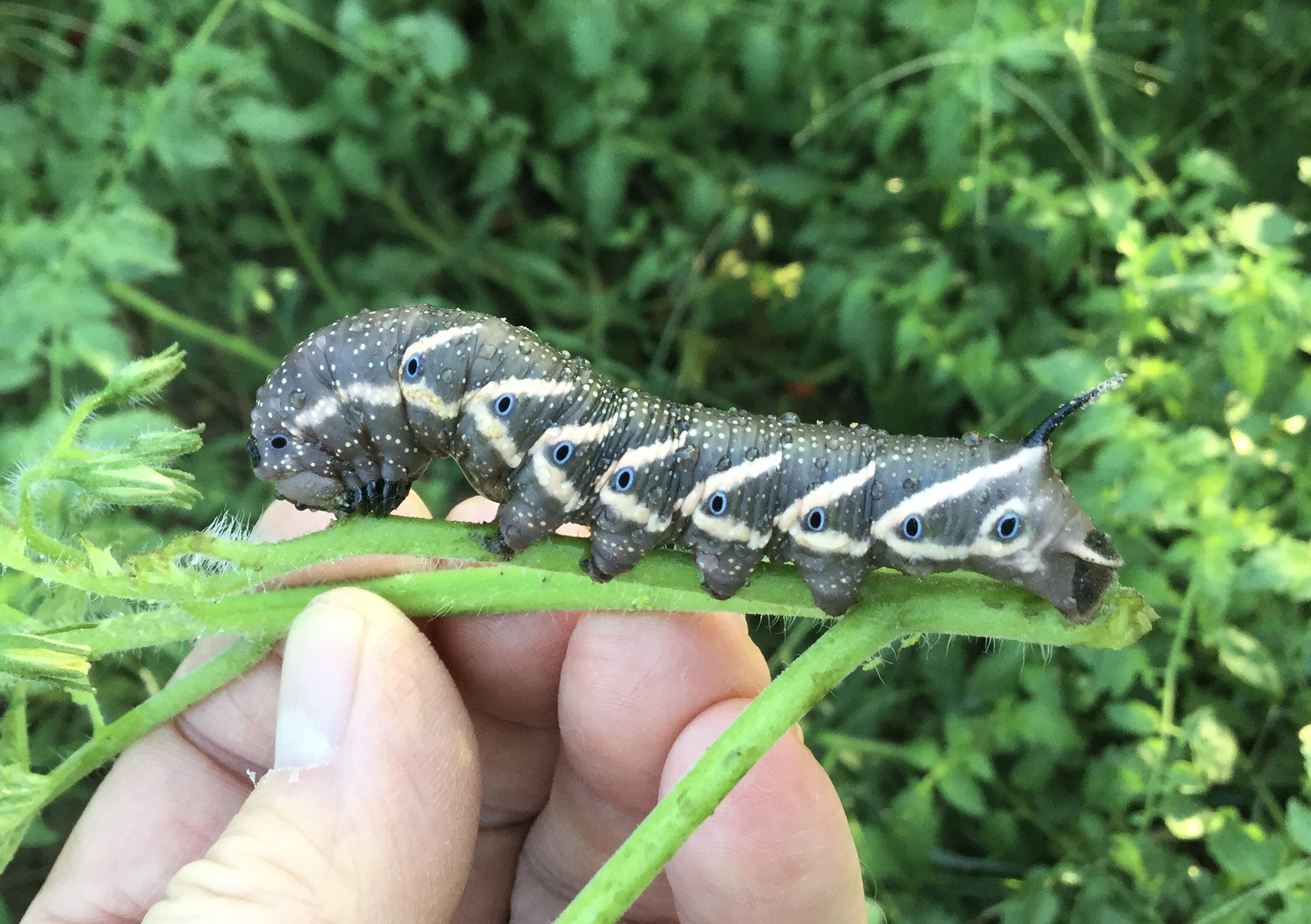
Tomato hornworm caught feeding on tomato plant

Because the larvae are pests of crop plants such as tomatoes and tobacco, biological control agents and traps have been used to control their populations. Gardeners whose tomato plants are predated by the tomato hornworm pick the caterpillars off of their plants. The use of a UV blacklight at night helps to find them, as they glow bright green. (see photo below). Among other examples, the larvae can also be eaten by most common bird species.

=== Parasites ===
The parasitoid wasp Trichogramma attacks M. quinquemaculata eggs. The larvae of the wasp develop in the egg, preventing the development of the caterpillar larvae. Trichogramma is a natural enemy of M. quinquemaculata and has also been used as a biological control agent by humans.

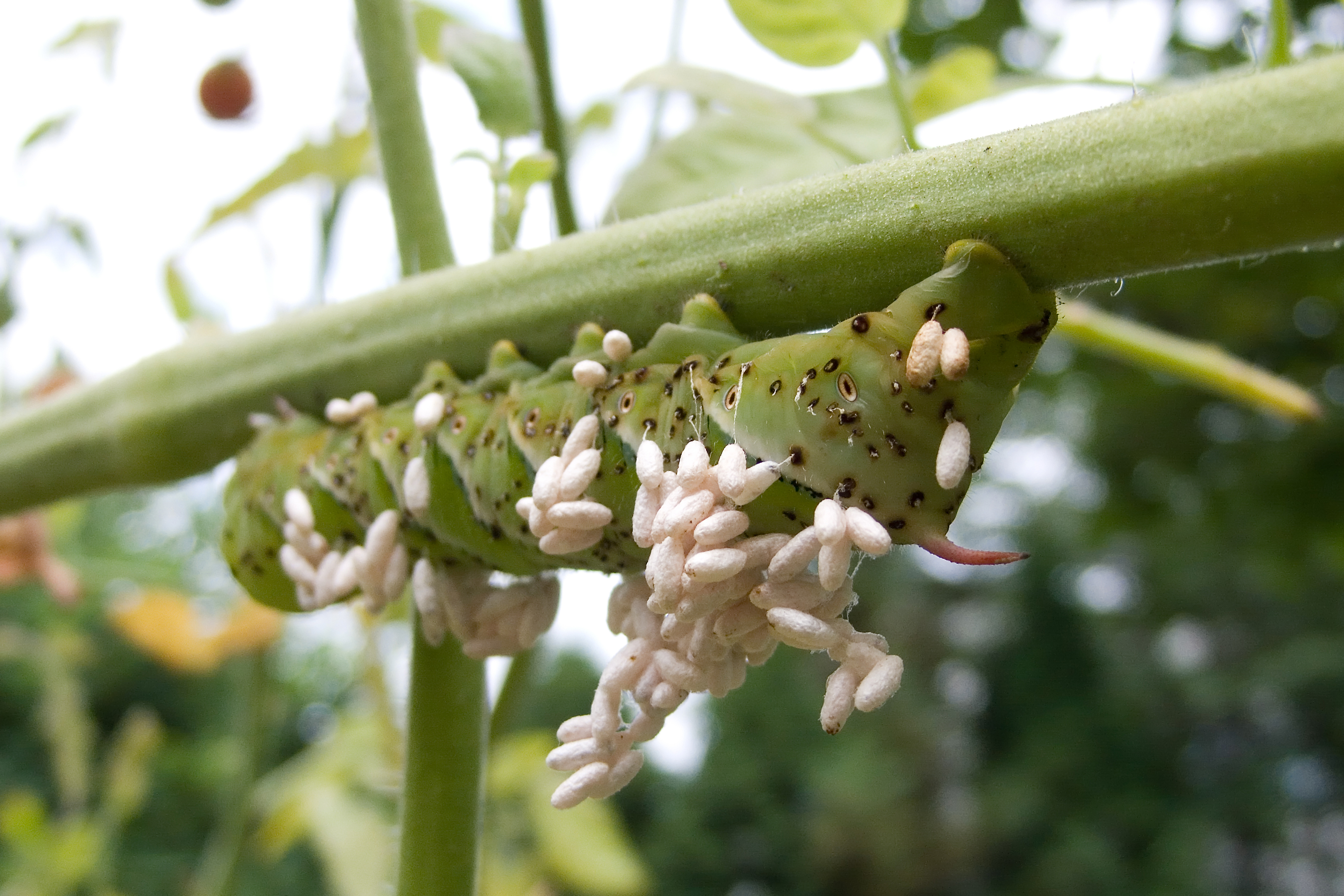
closely related tobacco hornworm parasitized by braconid wasp

A second parasitoid wasp, Cotesia congregata of the family Braconidae, also kills M. quinquemaculata. Adult females lay their eggs inside the skin of the hornworm caterpillar. After hatching, the wasp larvae use the organs and tissues of the caterpillar as food sources before burrowing out of the skin and pupating on the back and sides of the caterpillar. Once the wasps have emerged from their cocoons, the weakened caterpillar dies. Like the parasitoid wasp mentioned above, these wasps have also been suggested as a means of biological control of the tomato hornworm.

=== Traps ===
Adult M. quinquemaculata are most active in flight after dark. Early studies found that the moths are attracted to blacklight, which is used as a lure in some traps. Although the traps can be used for research and the moths can be released after capture, traps like these have been suggested as a means of population control. However, one study found that the reduction in population was not strong enough to significantly impact population size.

== Images ==
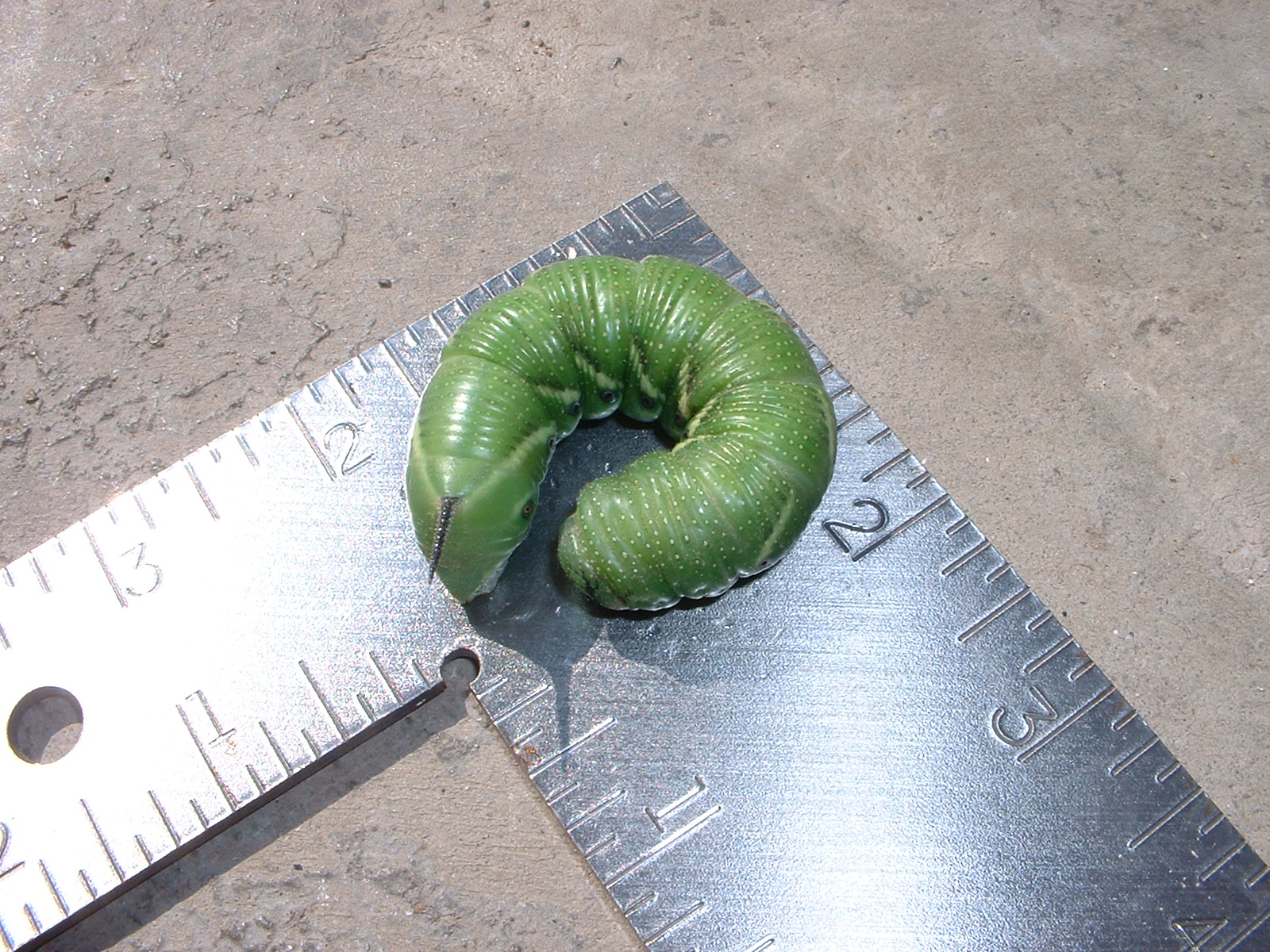
Tomato hornworm larva

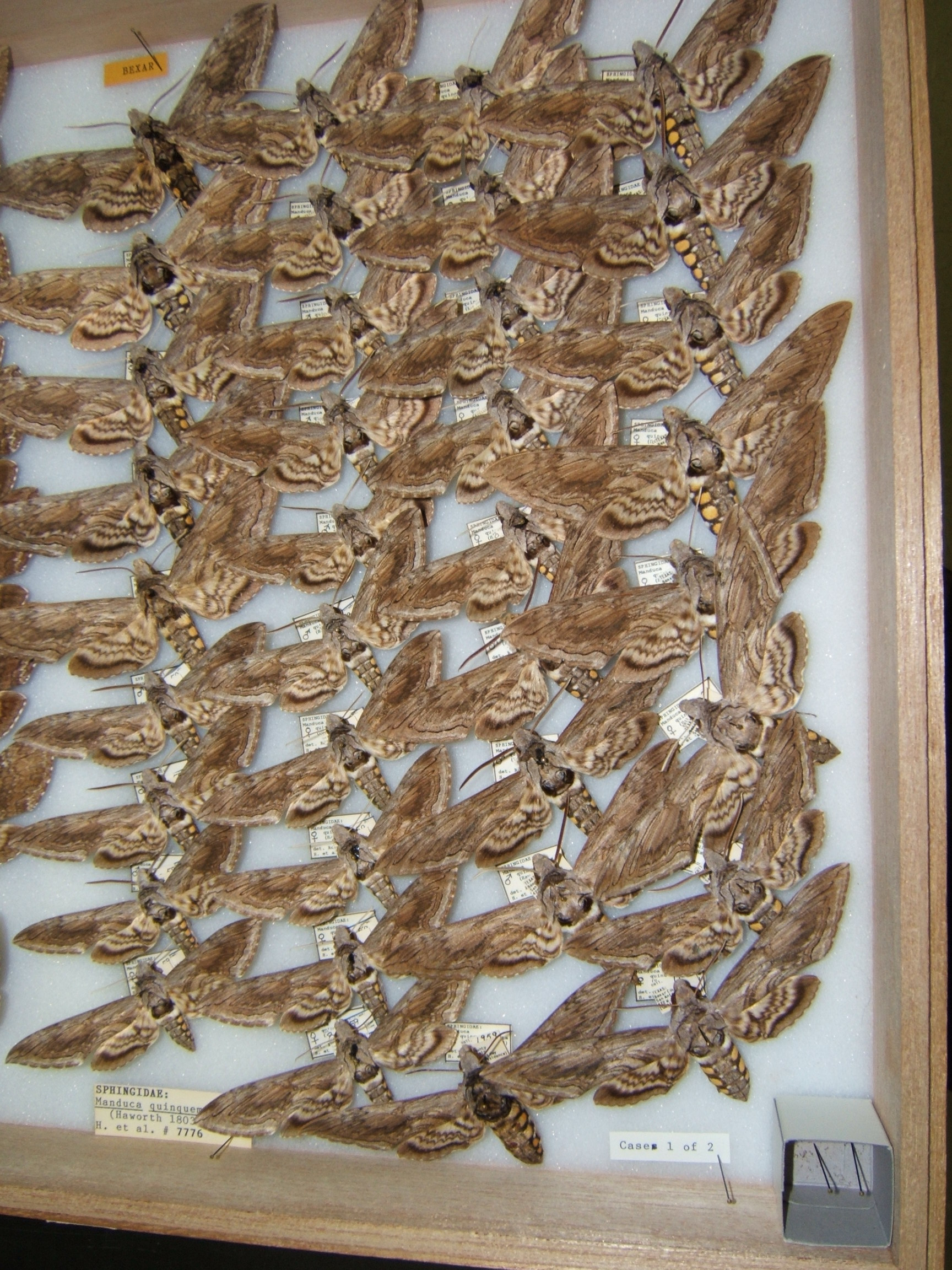
M. quinquemaculata diversity

Head detail

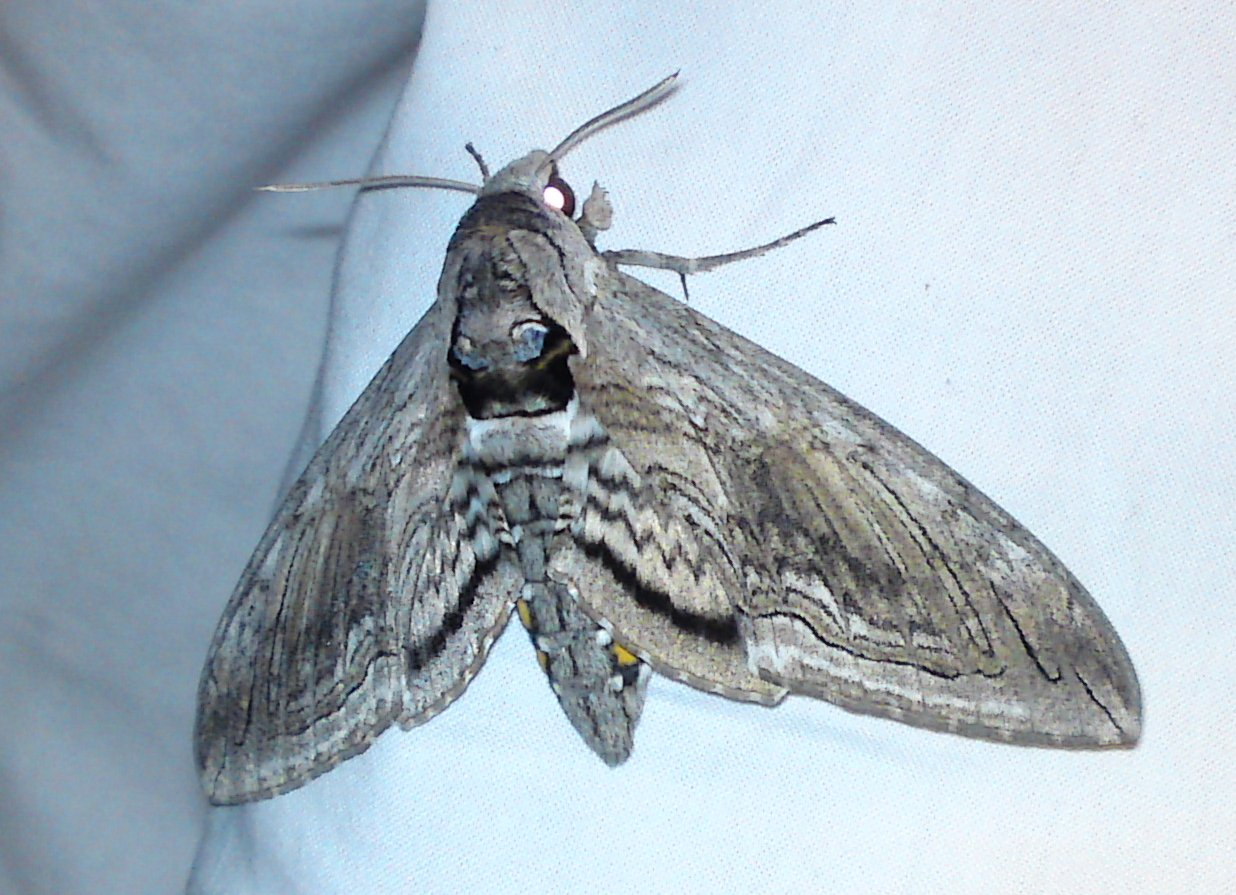
Live M. quinquemaculata

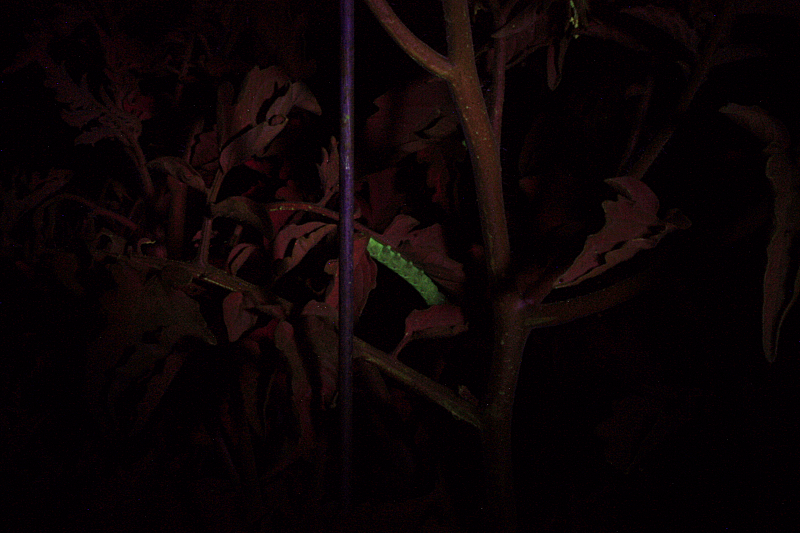
Tomato worm illuminated with UV on tomato plant
