= 4-hydroxyphenylacetaldehyde oxime monooxygenase =

Class of enzymes

Identifiers
- EC no.: 1.14.14.37

Databases
- BRENDA: enzyme data
- ExPASy: NiceZyme view
- KEGG: enzyme entry
- MetaCyc: metabolic pathway
- Rhea: reactions
- PDB structures: RCSB PDB PDBe PDBsum
- Gene Ontology: AmiGO / QuickGO
Search
- PMC: articles
- PubMed: articles
- NCBI: proteins

4-hydroxyphenylacetaldehyde oxime monooxygenase (EC 1.14.14.37, CYP71E1) is an enzyme that catalyzes a sequence of three chemical reactions that are part of the biosynthesis of the cyanogenic glycoside dhurrin in sorghum.

== Reactions catalysed ==
An earlier enzyme, in the pathway to dhurrin, tyrosine N-monooxygenase, converts L-tyrosine to (E)-(4-hydroxyphenyl)acetaldehyde oxime. The first reaction catalysed by 4-hydroxyphenylacetaldehyde oxime monooxygenase isomerises this compound to the (Z) oxime:

(E)-oxime
CYP71E1
(Z)-oxime

The enzyme then catalyses the loss of water from the intermediate (Z)-oxime, giving 4-hydroxyphenylacetonitrile:

(Z)-oxime
H_{2}O
4-hydroxyphenylacetonitrile

Finally, the cytochrome P450 component of the enzyme uses nicotinamide adenine dinucleotide phosphate (NADPH) and molecular oxygen to convert 4-hydroxyphenylacetonitrile to (S)-4-hydroxymandelonitrile.

4-hydroxyphenylacetonitrile
+ NADPH
O_{2} + H^{+}
H_{2}O
(S)-4-hydroxymandelonitrile
+ NADP^{+}

Cyanogenic glycoside, dhurrin

(S)-4-hydroxymandelonitrile is converted to dhurrin by the enzyme cyanohydrin beta-glucosyltransferase.

== Classification ==
The systematic name of this enzyme class is (Z)-4-hydroxyphenylacetaldehyde oxime,NADPH:oxygen oxidoreductase. Other names in common use include 4-hydroxybenzeneacetaldehyde oxime monooxygenase, cytochrome P450II-dependent monooxygenase, NADPH-cytochrome P450 reductase (CYP71E1), CYP71E1, and 4-hydroxyphenylacetaldehyde oxime,NADPH:oxygen oxidoreductase.
