= Uridine diphosphoglucose-cyanohydrin glucosyltransferase =

Uridine diphosphoglucose-cyanohydrin glucosyltransferase may refer to:

- Cyanohydrin beta-glucosyltransferase
- Hydroxymandelonitrile glucosyltransferase
