= Cyanohydrin beta-glucosyltransferase =

Class of enzymes

Identifiers
- EC no.: 2.4.1.85
- CAS no.: 55354-52-4

Databases
- IntEnz: IntEnz view
- BRENDA: BRENDA entry
- ExPASy: NiceZyme view
- KEGG: KEGG entry
- MetaCyc: metabolic pathway
- PRIAM: profile
- PDB structures: RCSB PDB PDBe PDBsum
- Gene Ontology: AmiGO / QuickGO
Search
- PMC: articles
- PubMed: articles
- NCBI: proteins

Cyanohydrin beta-glucosyltransferase (EC 2.4.1.85) is an enzyme that catalyzes the chemical reaction:

(S)-4-hydroxymandelonitrile
+ UDP-D-glucose
dhurrin

Tyrosine N-monooxygenase, the first enzyme in the pathway to dhurrin, converts L-tyrosine to (E)-(4-hydroxyphenyl)acetaldehyde oxime. Subsequently, (S)-4-hydroxymandelonitrile is formed by the action of 4-hydroxyphenylacetaldehyde oxime monooxygenase.

Cyanohydrin beta-glucosyltransferase uses uridine diphosphate glucose (UDP-D-glucose) to add the glucoside component. The enzyme is a glycosyltransferase, specifically one of the hexosyltransferases. The systematic name of this enzyme class is UDP-D-glucose:(S)-4-hydroxymandelonitrile beta-D-glucosyltransferase. Other names in common use include uridine diphosphoglucose-p-hydroxymandelonitrile, glucosyltransferase, UDP-glucose-p-hydroxymandelonitrile glucosyltransferase, uridine diphosphoglucose-cyanohydrin glucosyltransferase, uridine diphosphoglucose:aldehyde cyanohydrin, beta-glucosyltransferase, UDP-glucose:(S)-4-hydroxymandelonitrile beta-D-glucosyltransferase, UGT85B1, and UDP-glucose:p-hydroxymandelonitrile-O-glucosyltransferase.

The enzyme from Sorghum bicolor can act on a range of alcohols, not just the cyanohydrin group of 4-hydroxymandelonitrile.
