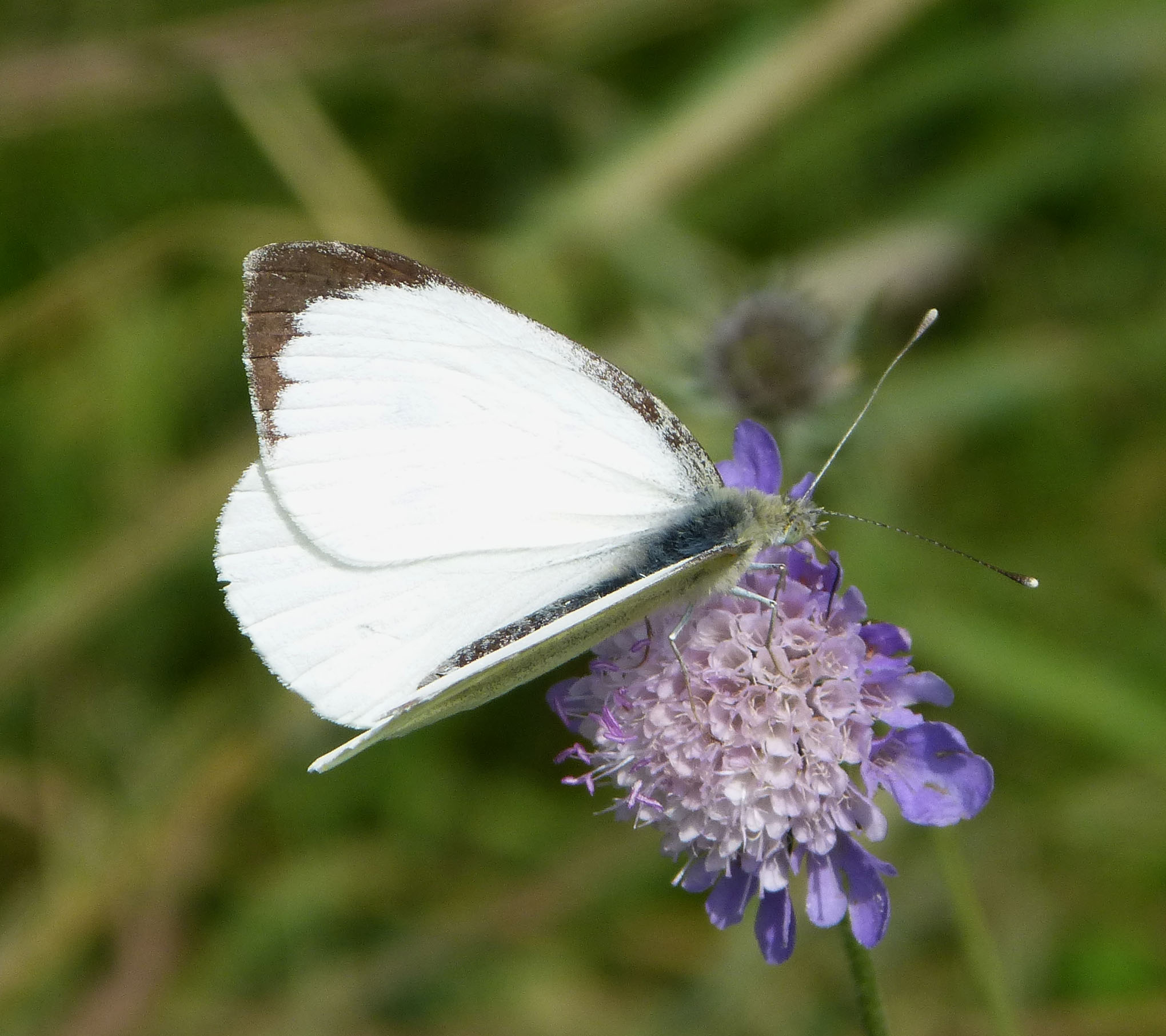
- Male
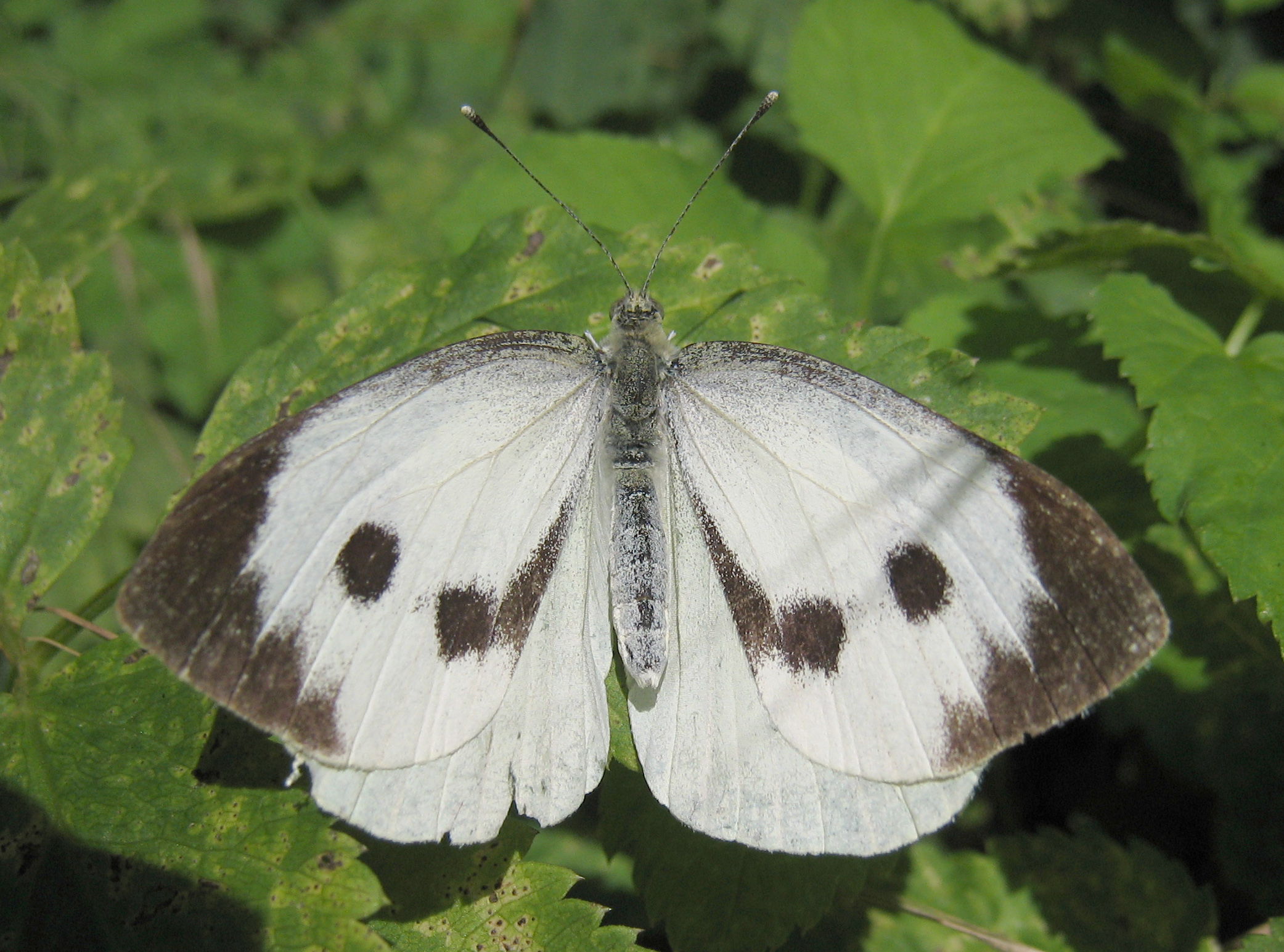
- Female

Conservation status
- Least Concern (IUCN 3.1)

Scientific classification
- Kingdom: Animalia
- Phylum: Arthropoda
- Clade: Pancrustacea
- Class: Insecta
- Order: Lepidoptera
- Family: Pieridae
- Genus: Pieris
- Species: P. brassicae

Binomial name
- Pieris brassicae (Linnaeus, 1758)

Synonyms
- Papilio brassicae Linnaeus, 1758

= Pieris brassicae =

Large white

Species of butterfly

Pieris brassicae, the large white, also called cabbage butterfly, cabbage white, (Note: In North America, "cabbage white" and "cabbage butterfly" refer instead to Pieris rapae, also known as the "small white".) cabbage moth (erroneously), or in India the large cabbage white, is a butterfly in the family Pieridae. It is a close relative of the small white, Pieris rapae.

The large white is common throughout Europe, North Africa and Asia.

== Distribution ==
The large white is common throughout Europe, north Africa, and Asia to the Himalayas often in agricultural areas, meadows and parkland. It has managed to establish a population in South Africa and in 1995 it was predicted to spread to Australia and New Zealand.

The large white is a strong flier and the British population has been reinforced in most years by migrations from the continent. Scattered reports of the large white from the north-eastern United States (New York, Rhode Island and Maine) over the past century are of a dubious nature and indicate either accidental transport or intentional release. Such introductions threaten to establish this agricultural pest in North America.

In 2010 the butterfly was found in Nelson, New Zealand where it is known as the great white butterfly. It is classed as an unwanted pest due to the potential effect on crops. For a limited period in October 2013 the Department of Conservation offered a monetary reward for the capture of the butterfly. After two weeks, the public had captured 134 butterflies, netting $10 for each one handed in. As a result of this and other containment measures, such as over 263,000 searches in the upper South Island and the release of predatory wasps, the large white was officially declared to be eradicated from New Zealand as of December 2014.

=== Eggs ===
The large white ova are pale yellow, turning darker yellow within twenty-four hours of being oviposited. A few hours prior to hatching, they become black, the shell more transparent, and the larvae visible within.

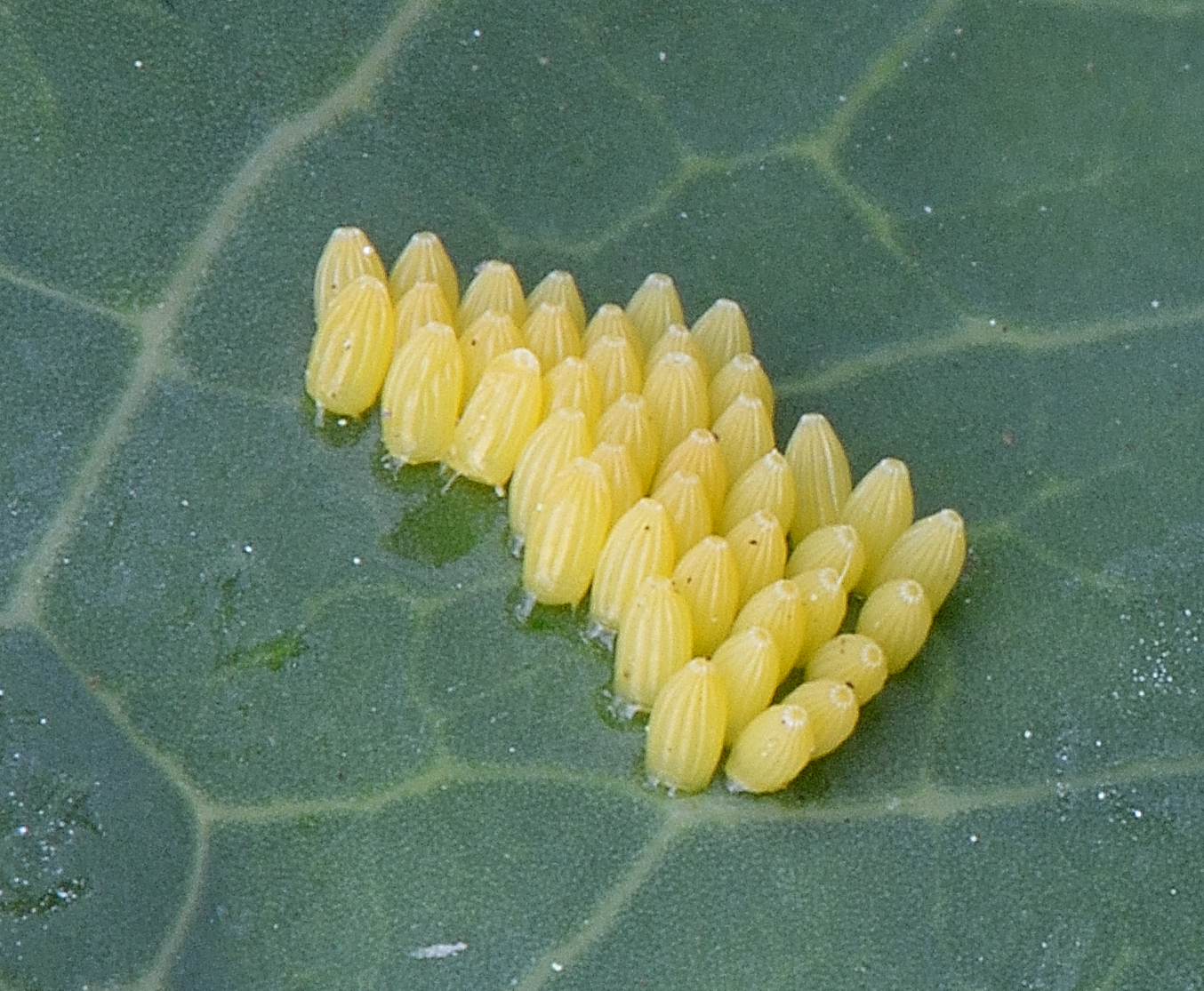
Eggs of the large white on the underside of the cauliflower leaf

=== Larvae ===
Large white larvae experience four moultings and five instars. The first instar follows the hatching of the egg into large white larvae. The larvae are light yellow with distinctive brown heads and have soft bodies. The larvae appear to be very hairy. Following a moulting, the larvae enter the second instar. They have tubercles covered with black hair. In the third instar, large white larvae display more activity. This instar is when the larvae are observed to eat voraciously, and cause significant amounts of damage to their host plant. At this point, they are observed to be more yellow in colour, studded with black dots. Following the third instar, the larvae go through the fourth instar, with similar appearances as the larvae of the third instar, but with more aggrandized size and feeding behaviour. The large white larvae are observed to be cylindrical, robust, and elongated by the fifth instar, yellow in colour and with bright colouration on their abdomen and thorax. They are also observed to have a grey and black head. This instar requires maximum food quality and quantity in order to aid in full development, otherwise the larva dies before becoming an adult butterfly.

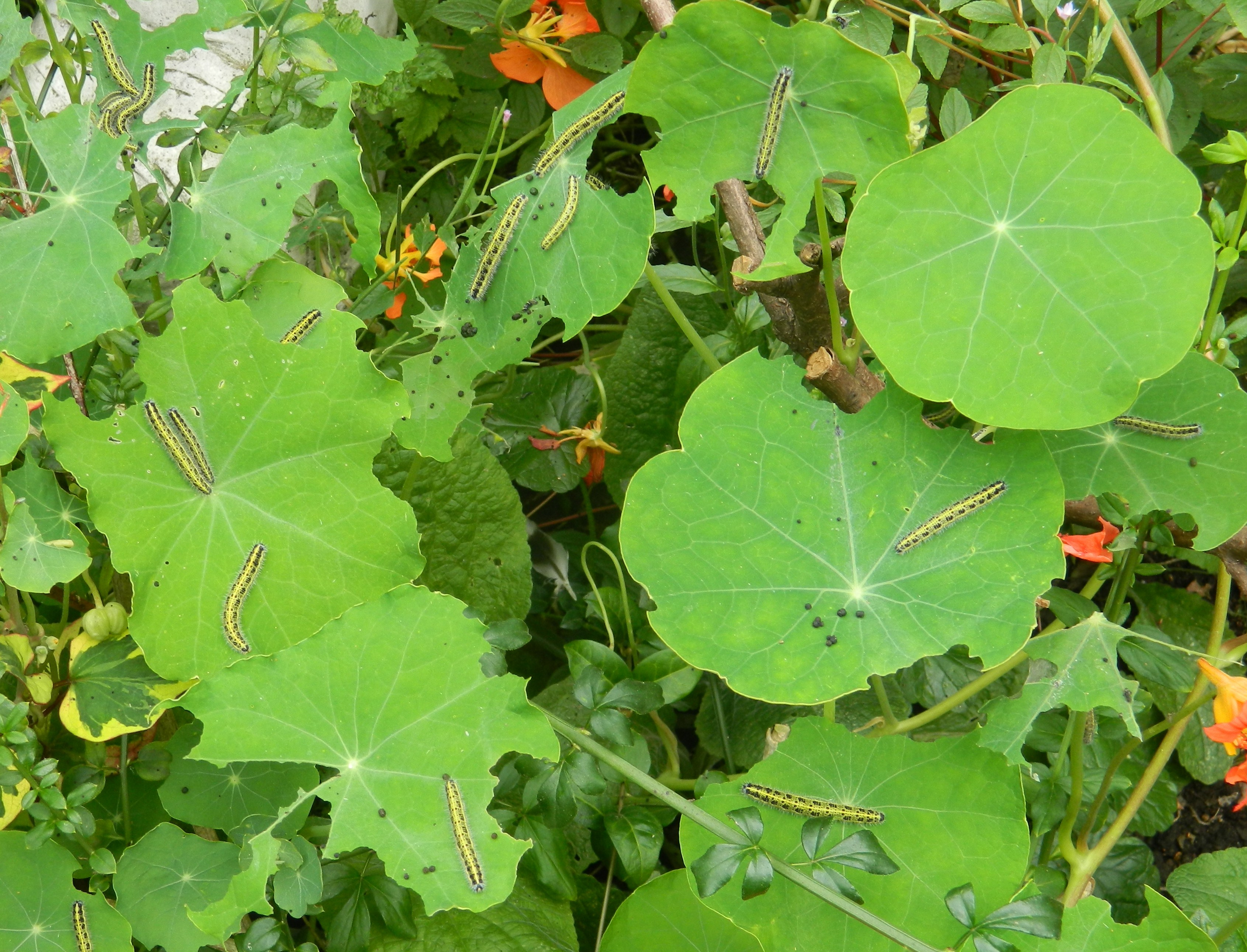
Large white caterpillars on garden nasturtium leaves

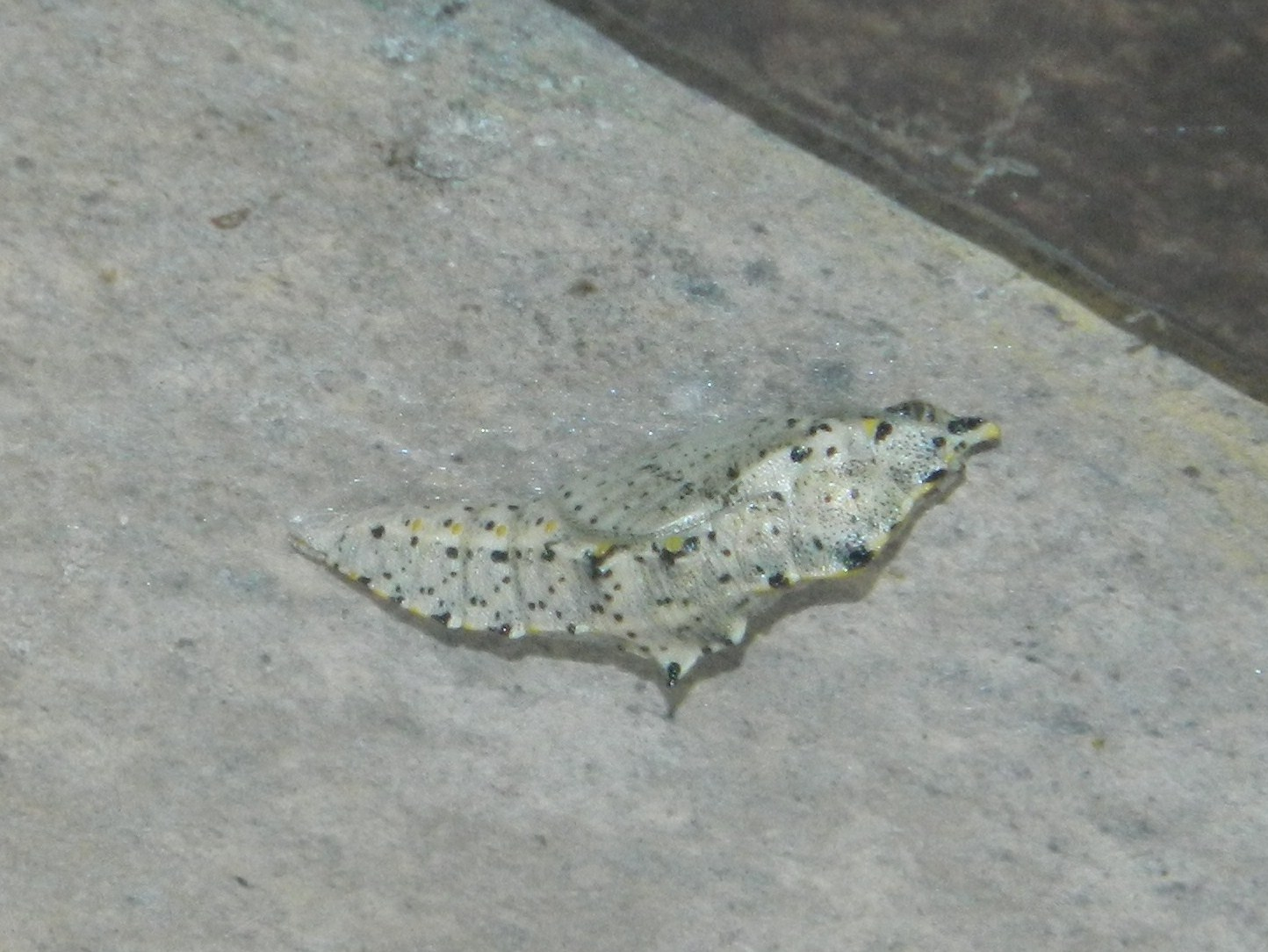
Large white chrysalis, under house eaves

=== Imagines ===
For both males and females, the wings are white with black tips on the forewings. The female also has two black spots on each forewing. The underside of each wing is a pale greenish and serves as excellent camouflage when at rest. The black markings are generally darker in the summer brood. The large white butterfly's wingspan reaches 5 to 6.5 cm on average.

==== Male ====
The upperside of the male is creamy white. The forewing is irrorated (sprinkled) with black scales at the base and along the costa for a short distance. The apex and termen above vein 2 are more or less broadly black with the inner margin of the black area containing a regular even curve. In one or two specimens a small longitudinally narrow black spot was found in interspace 3. Hindwing: uniform, irrorated with black scales at base, a large black subcostal spot before the apex, and in a few specimens indications of black scaling on the termen anteriorly. The underside of the forewing is white, slightly irrorated with black scales at the base of cell and along costa. The apex is light ochraceous brown with a large black spot in outer half of interspace 1 and another quadrate black spot at base of interspace 3. The hindwing is light ochraceous brown, closely irrorated with minute black scales. The subcostal black spot before the apex shows through from the upperside. The antennae are black and white at apex. The head, thorax, and abdomen are black, with some white hairs, where underneath is whitish.

==== Female ====
The upperside of the female is similar to that of the male, but the irroration of black scales at the bases of the wings is more extended. The black area on apex and termen of forewing is broader, its inner margin less evenly curved. A conspicuous large, black spot also exists in the outer half of interspace 1 near the base of interspace 3. On the hindwing the subcostal black spot before the apex is much larger and more prominent. The underside is similar to that of the male but the apex of the forewing and the whole surface of the hindwing is a light ochraceous yellow, not ochraceous brown. The black discal spots on forewing are much larger. The antennae, head, thorax, and abdomen of the females are the same as for the male.

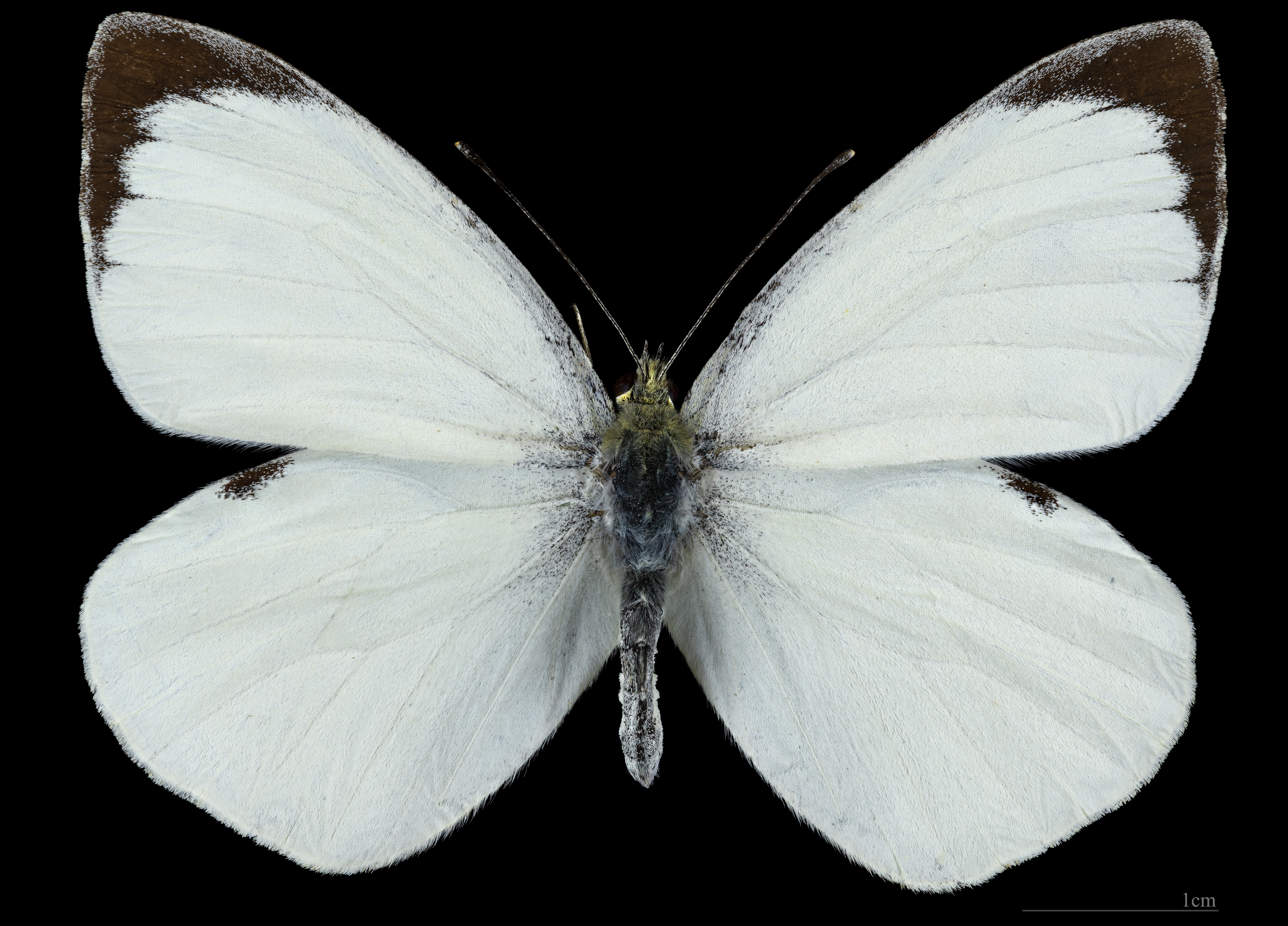
Pieris brassicae ♂

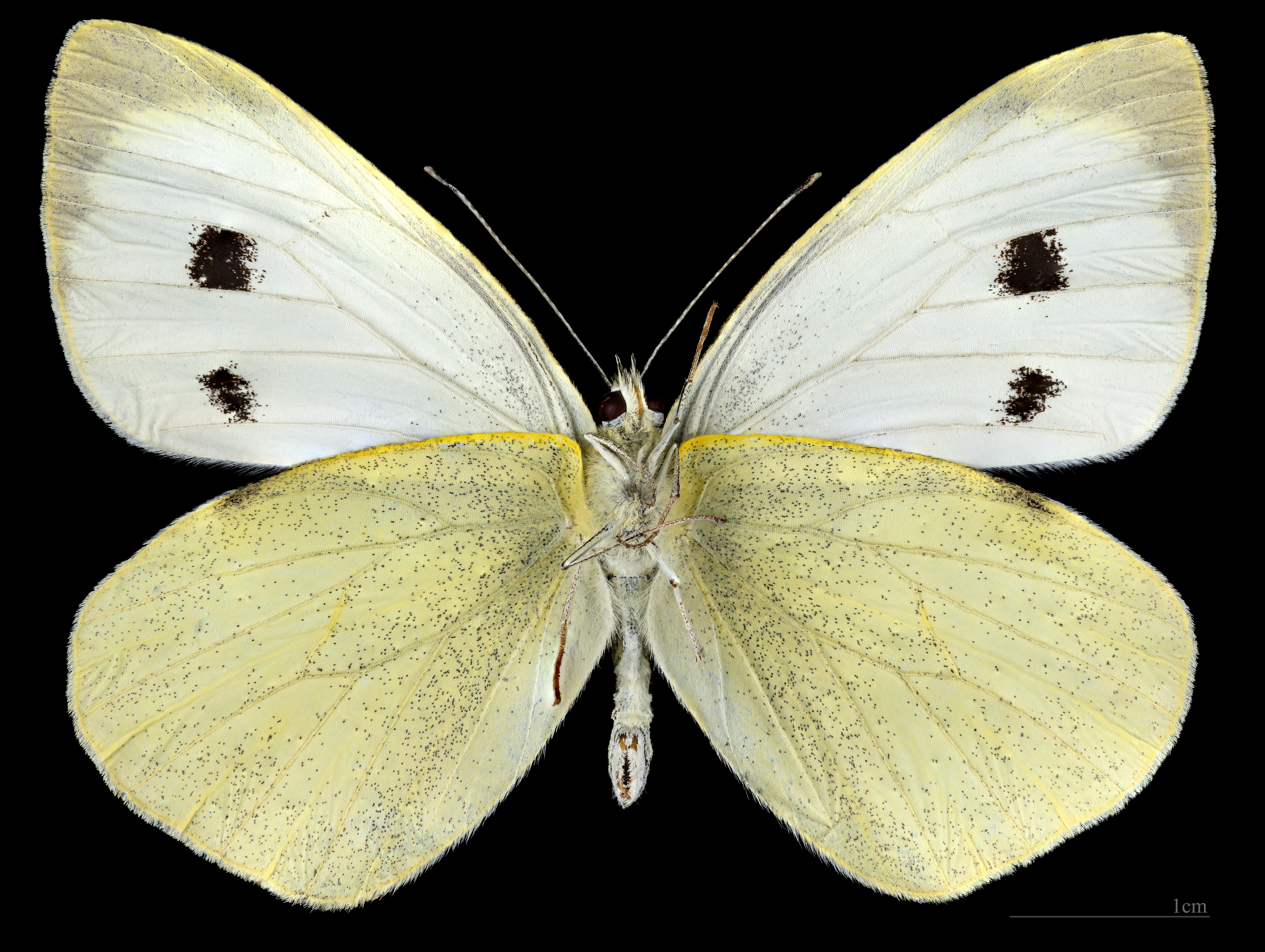
Pieris brassicae ♂ △

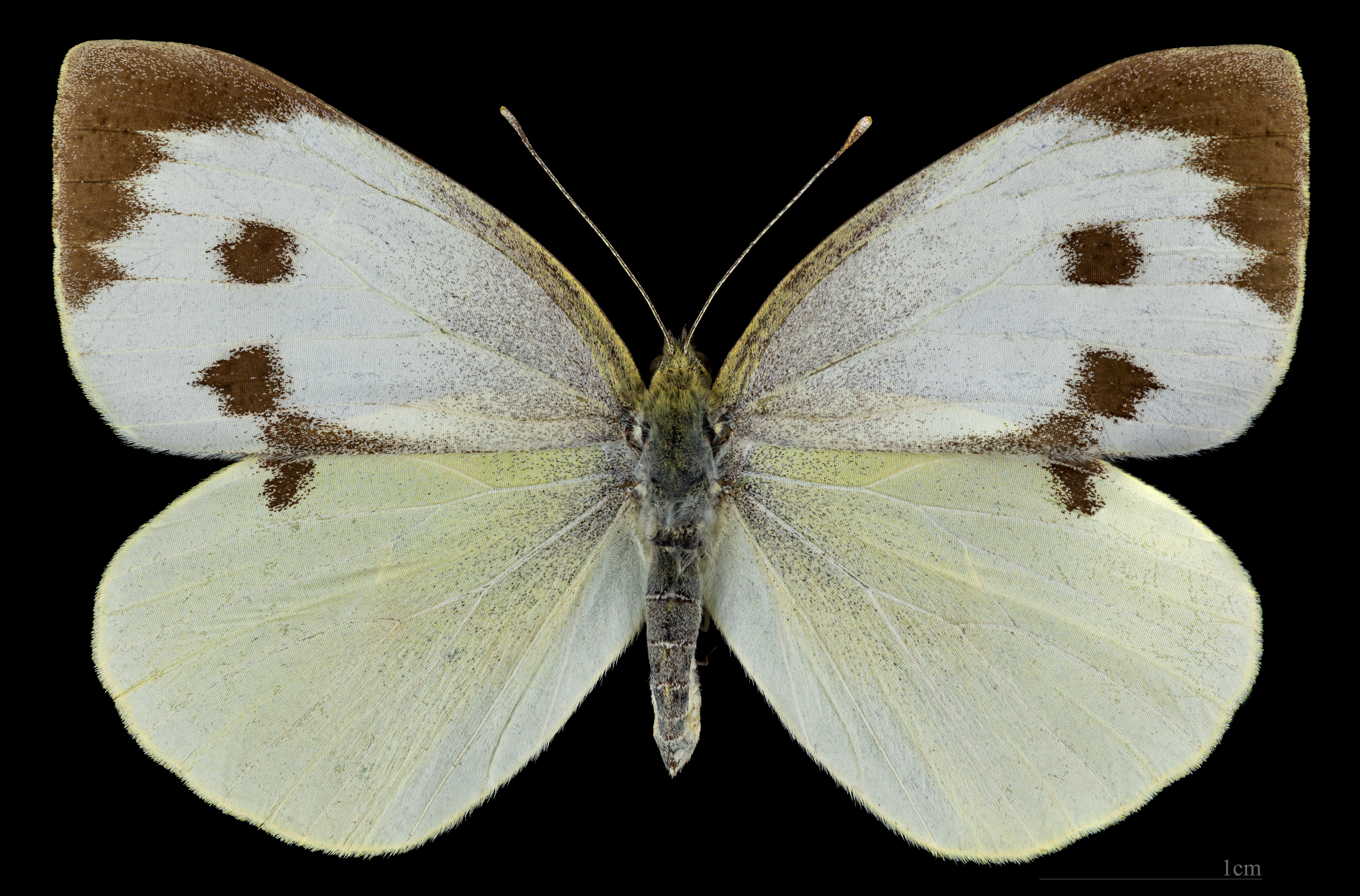
Pieris brassicae ♀

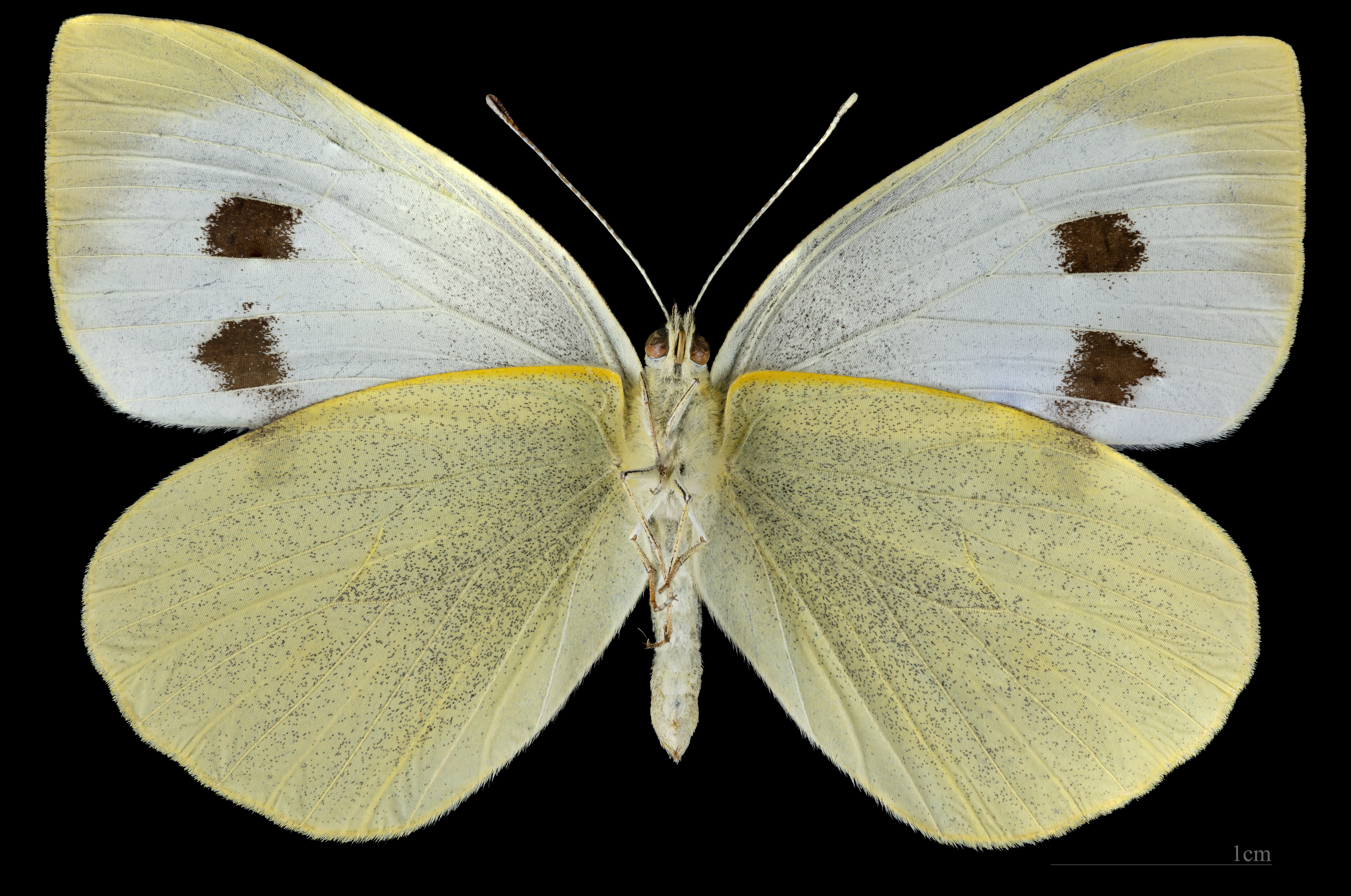
Pieris brassicae ♀ △

== Habitat ==
The large white butterfly's habitat consists of large, open spaces, as well as farms and vegetable gardens, because of the availability of its food source. Some favoured locations include walls, fences, tree trunks, and often their food plant. They primarily hover around these locations, which should contain both wild and cultivated crucifer, as well as oil-seed rape, cabbages, and Brussels sprouts.

== Reproduction and development ==
=== Mating system ===
These butterflies can be polyandrous, but it is not the predominant mating system. This means that, though some female butterflies can have more than one mate, most of the large white females only have one male mate at a time through a monogamous mating system.

Two generations of butterflies are produced each year. The first brood consists of adults with a spring hatching around April. The second brood is made up of adults that hatch around July. Sometimes, a third brood can be observed farther along in the summer if the weather is warm enough.

=== Life cycle ===
==== Oviposition ====
These female butterflies oviposit in clusters on the undersides of leaves because the larvae prefer the morphology of leaf undersides over the upper surface of leaves. To oviposit, the female butterflies use the tip of the abdomen and arrange the ova in specific batches.

The pre-oviposition period, which lasts three to eight days, provides ample time for these butterflies to mate. Females tend to use their forelegs to drum on the surfaces of their intended leaves as a test of the plant's suitability for breeding. If they find a suitable surface, female large whites oviposit two to three days following copulation. They oviposit approximately six to seven times in eight days. The females can pair up to mate again approximately five or more days after the previous mating.

===== Choosing locations for oviposition =====
Females rely on visual cues, such as the colours of plants, to decide where to lay their eggs. They favour green surfaces in particular to display oviposition behaviour. This colour preference could be due to the fact that the large white's food source also acts as a host plant for oviposition.

Most females choose nectar plants like buddleia or thistles, which are green and ideal plants for the larvae. These plants, used as oviposition sites, typically contain mustard oil glucosides, whose primary function is to help the larvae survive as their essential food source. For instance, previous studies have shown that the large white larvae do not survive if the adult butterflies oviposit on a different host plant such as broad bean (Vicia faba) because this bean does not contain the proper nutrients to aid larval development.

==== Hatching ====
The large white eggs hatch approximately one week after being laid and live as a group for some time. The hatching period constitutes around two to seven hours. Upon hatching, they cause a lot of damage to the host plant by eating away at and destroying the host plant. As expected during the colder moments of the day they may appear inactive - dormant.

==== Hibernation and aestivation ====
In the majority of their range, overwintering is via pupal diapause, although on the southern part of the Iberian peninsula summer diapause (aestivation) occurs.

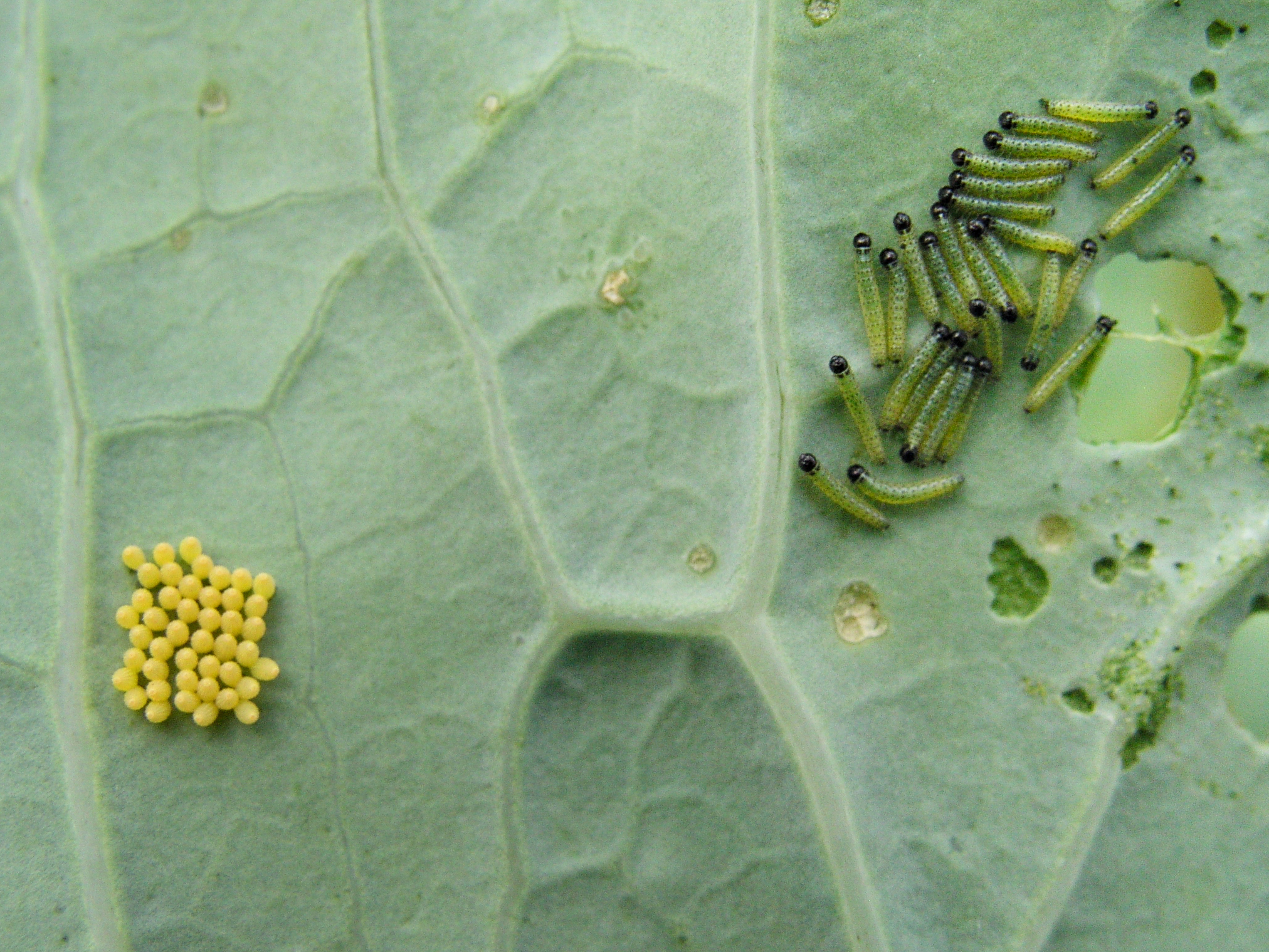
Eggs and newly hatched caterpillars

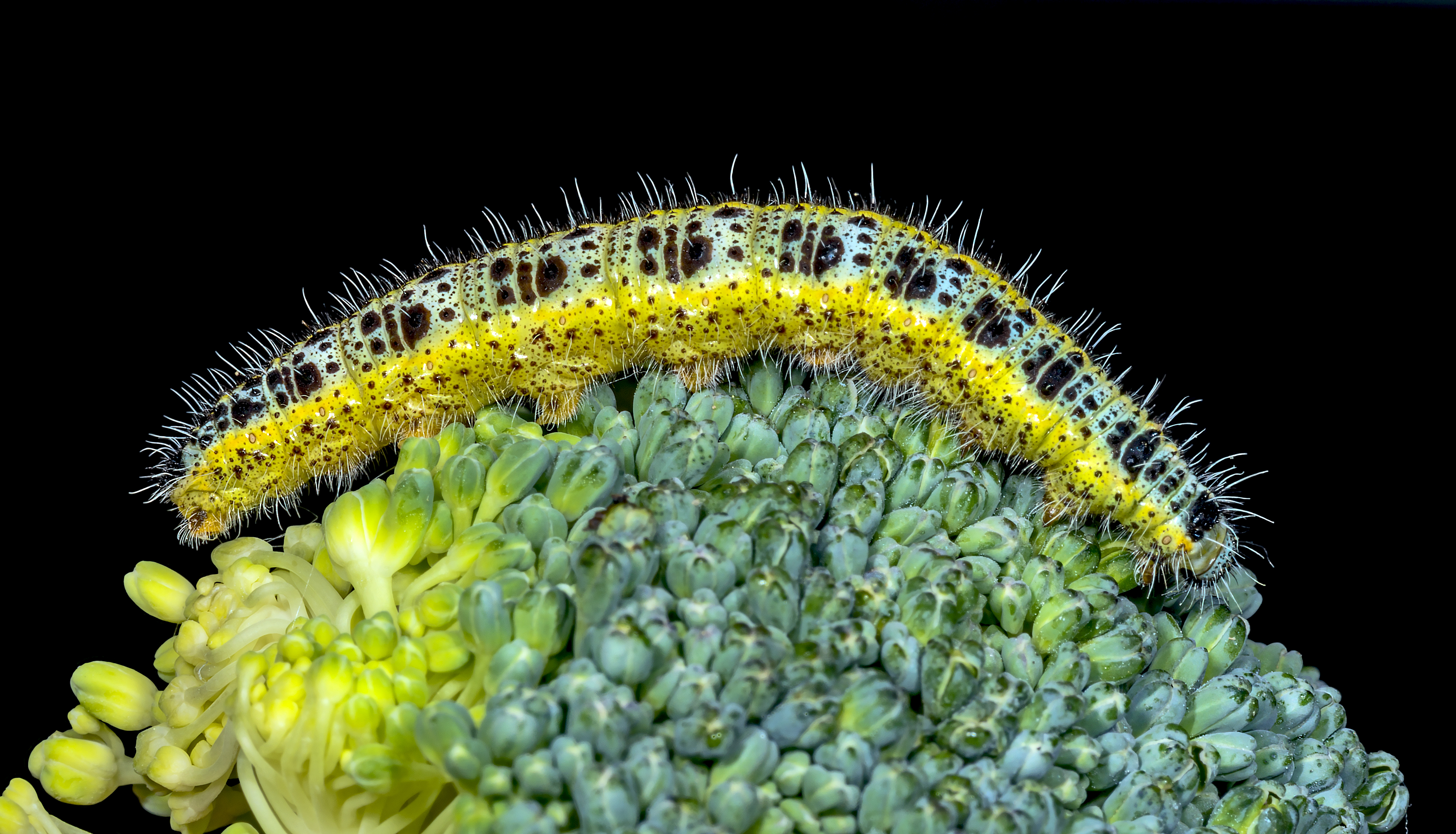
Caterpillar

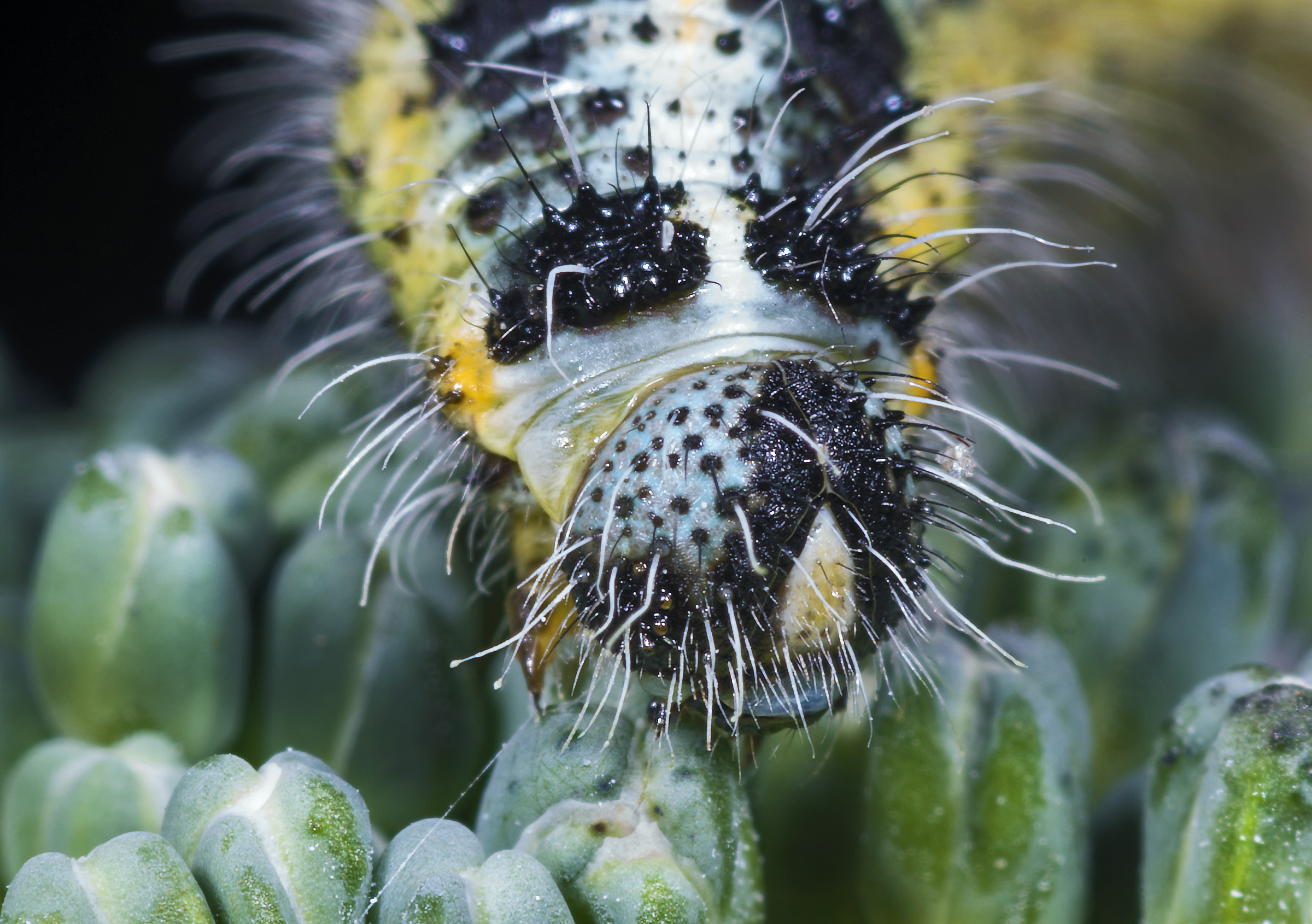
Caterpillar

== Behaviour ==
=== Migration ===
The large whites are found throughout most of Eurasia, though there are some seasonal fluctuations present due to migration. The northern populations tend to be augmented during the summer migration season from butterflies from southern areas. The large whites fly starting early spring, and keep migrating until seasons shift to autumn and the resultant cold weather. This means the large whites typically take two to three flights per butterfly reproductive season.

Large white butterfly migration patterns are typically observed only when there is a disturbance. In general, the large white butterfly's migratory patterns are atypical; normally, butterflies fly towards the poles in the spring, and towards the more temperate Equator during the fall. However, they fly in random directions, excluding north, in the spring, and there is little return migration observed. However, it has been hard to track entire migratory paths, since these butterflies can migrate more than 800 kilometres; thus, individual butterflies may not migrate the 800 kilometres, but rather that other butterflies start their migrations from where the other butterflies ended.

=== Hibernation ===
Large white broods in the north have not been seen to overwinter, nor hibernate over the winter, successfully. However, they have been observed to hibernate in the south in the Northern Hemisphere.

=== Territorial behaviour ===
Males do not display considerable amounts of territorial behaviour. It has been suggested that this could be a reason why there is no observed significant sexual dimorphism between the male and female large white butterflies.

== Ecology ==
=== Diet and food selection ===
Large white butterflies have a preference for what types of food plant they usually eat. Studies have shown that the preference for certain plants is reliant upon the butterflies' previous experiences. The large white butterflies, then, are shown to rely on the species of food plants, the time of experience, and the choice-situation. Thus, the large white butterflies learn what types of foods they prefer, rather than relying on their sense organs or physiological changes. In contrast, this preference for adult food plant differs from the preference of female large whites using visual cues such as plant colour to determine the best host plants for oviposition.

Plants with mustard-oil glucosides are important for this butterfly because it dictates their eating behaviours, and resultant survival rates, as specified in the section regarding oviposition. This is so beneficial for large whites because their large consumption of plants containing mustard oils is the specific reason they are so distasteful to predators, such as birds. Thus, caterpillars are protected from attack, despite them being brightly coloured; in fact, the bright colouration is to signal to predators that they taste bad.

However, there is more benefit to this species' use of mustard oil glucosides. In addition to predator protection, these glucosides belong to a class of stimuli that produce the biting responses associated with eating. Some plants contain alkaloids and steroids; these reduce and inhibit the butterflies' responsiveness to mustard oil glucosides. Thus, this utilization of mustard oil glucosides dramatically affects the behaviour of the butterfly, and the resulting food selection for survival.

The food source of the larva of the white butterfly are cabbages, radishes, and the undersides of leaves. Adults feed on flower nectar.

=== Predators ===
Large white butterflies do not have a specific group of predators. Instead, they are preyed upon by a wide range of animals, and even the occasional plant. This butterfly's main predators include birds; however, large whites can also be preyed upon by species in orders such as Hymenoptera, Hemiptera, Coleoptera, Diptera, Arachnid; some species of mammals, one of reptiles, one species of insectivorous plant, and species in amphibian orders, as well as other miscellaneous insect species. The butterflies are typically preyed upon as eggs, larvae, and imagoes.

=== Aposematism ===
Large white butterflies emit an unpleasant smell which deters predators. In addition, large whites are an aposematic species, meaning that they display warning colours, which benefits the large whites against predation. This aposematic colouration occurs in the larval, pupal, and imago stages, where toxic mustard oil glycosides from food plants are stored in the individuals' bodies. Aposematism is not entirely related to Müllerian mimicry; however, large white larvae often benefit from multiple other aposematic larvae from other species, such as the larvae of Papilio machaon.

== Relationship to people ==
=== Role as pests ===
The crops most susceptible to P. brassicae damage in areas in Europe are those in the genus Brassica (cabbage, mustard, and their allies), particularly Brussels sprouts, cabbage, cauliflower, kohlrabi, rape, swede, and turnip. The attacks to crops are rather localized and can lead to 100% crop loss in a certain area. In addition, because of its strong inclination to migrate, adults may infest new areas that were previously free from attack. Because many of the host plants of P. brassicae are sold for consumption, damage by these butterflies can cause a great reduction of crop value. Larvae may also bore into the vegetable heads of cabbage and cauliflower and cause damage. High populations of these larvae may also skeletonise their host plants. In present-day areas such as Great Britain, P. brassicae are now less threatening as pests because of natural and chemical control reasons. However, it is still considered a pest in other European countries, in China, India, Nepal, and Russia. In fact, it is estimated to cause over 40% yield loss annually on different crop vegetables in India and Turkey.

== Subspecies ==
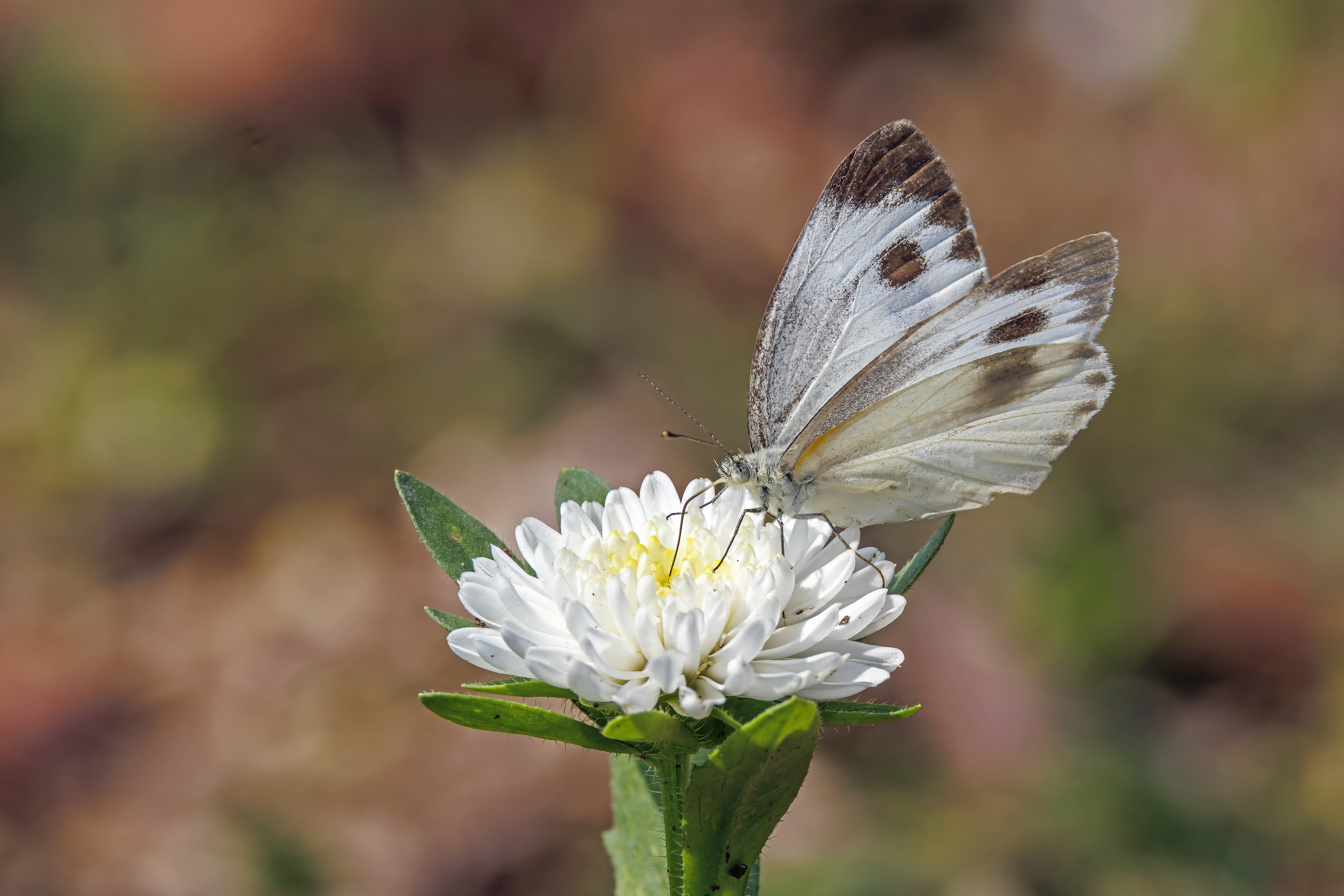
P. b. nepalensis) on China aster (Callistephus chinensis), Laos

Subspecies include the following:

- Pieris brassicae azorensis Rebel, 1917
- Pieris brassicae brassicae (Linnaeus, 1758)
- Pieris brassicae catoleuca Röber, 1896
- Pieris brassicae cyniphia (Turati, 1924)
- Pieris brassicae cypria Verity, 1908
- Pieris brassicae italorum Stauder, 1921
- Pieris brassicae nepalensis Gray, 1846
- Pieris brassicae ottonis Röber, 1907
- Pieris brassicae subtaeniata (Turati, 1929)
- Pieris brassicae vazquezi Oberthür, 1914
- Pieris brassicae verna Zeller, 1924
- Pieris brassicae wollastoni (Butler, 1886) †

== See also ==
- Madeiran large white
