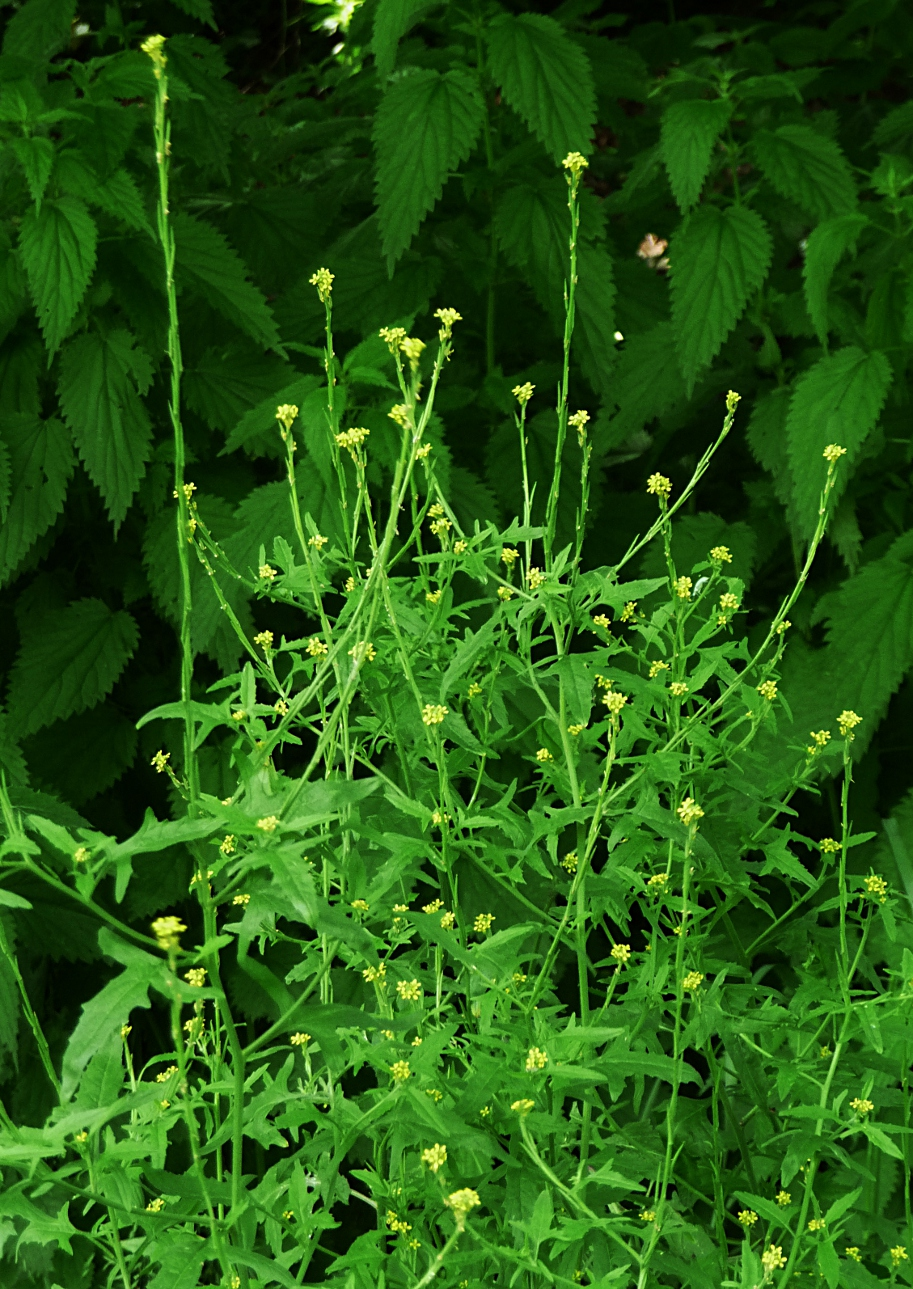

Scientific classification
- Kingdom: Plantae
- Clade: Tracheophytes
- Clade: Angiosperms
- Clade: Eudicots
- Clade: Rosids
- Order: Brassicales
- Family: Brassicaceae
- Genus: Sisymbrium
- Species: S. officinale

Binomial name
- Sisymbrium officinale (L.) Scop.

Synonyms
- Erysimum officinale L.

= Sisymbrium officinale =

Hedge-mustard

Species of flowering plant

Sisymbrium officinale, the hedge mustard, (formerly Erysimum officinale) is a plant in the family Brassicaceae.

== Description ==
It is distinct from the mustard plants which belong to the genus Brassica. S. officinale is similar to other Sisymbrium, but differs in its tall, erect stems with tiny flowers and fruits that are compacted parallel to the stem instead of hanging free. S.officinale grows to 80 cm high. The lower leaves are broad with two or three lateral lobes. The flowers are about 4 mm across and yellow. Fruits are long and without hairs when young but show hairs when mature and reach 18 mm long on racemes pressed close to the stems.

Hedge-mustard is food for the caterpillars of some Lepidoptera, such as the small white (Pieris rapae).

== Distribution ==
Once indigenous to North Africa and southern Europe, but found in Ireland, Wales and England and also in the highlands of Scotland. It is found on roadsides, wasteland and as a weed of arable land. It is now well-established throughout the world.

== Uses ==
=== In food ===
This plant is widely cultivated across Europe for its edible leaves and seeds. It is widely used as a condiment in Northern Europe (particularly Denmark, Norway and Germany).

The plant is also eaten in combination with yogurt in some parts of the Levant.

The leaves have a bitter cabbage-like flavour and they are used either in salads or cooked as a leaf vegetable (in cultivar versions). The seeds have been used to make mustard pastes in Europe.

=== Traditional medicine ===
The Greeks believed it was an antidote to all poisons. In folk medicine, it was used to soothe sore throats - indeed one French name for it is the herbe aux chantres (the singers' plant). This plant "grows by our roadsides and on waste ground, where it is a common weed, with a peculiar aptitude for collecting and retaining dust...it is named by the French the 'Singer's Plant,' it having been considered up to the time of Louis XIV an infallible remedy for loss of voice. Jean Racine, writing to Nicolas Boileau, recommends him to try the syrup...in order to be cured of voicelessness." It is "good for all diseases of the chest and lungs, hoarseness of voice...the juice...made into a syrup with honey or sugar, is no less effectual...for all other coughs, wheezing and shortness of breath...the seed is held to be a special remedy against poison and venom." It was "formerly used for hoarseness, weak lungs and to help the voice." Herbalists use the juice and flowers for bronchitis and stomach ailments, among other uses, and as a revitalizer. In Tibetan medicine it is used to repress the symptoms of food poisoning.
