= 4-Hydroxyphenylacetonitrile =

Names
- Preferred IUPAC name 4-(Hydroxyphenyl)acetonitrile

Identifiers
CAS Number	14191-95-8
3D model (JSmol)	Interactive image
ChEBI	CHEBI:16667
ChemSpider	24729
ECHA InfoCard	100.034.572
EC Number	238-046-0
KEGG	C03766
PubChem CID	26548
UNII	18Q5J224RM
CompTox Dashboard (EPA)	DTXSID90161856
- InChI: InChI=1S/C8H7NO/c9-6-5-7-1-3-8(10)4-2-7/h1-4,10H,5H2 Key: AYKYOOPFBCOXSL-UHFFFAOYSA-N
- SMILES: C1=CC(=CC=C1CC#N)O

Properties
Chemical formula	C_{8}H_{7}NO
Molar mass	133.15 g·mol^{−1}

Hazards
- GHS labelling
Pictograms	(GHS07: Exclamation mark)
Signal word	Warning
Hazard statements	H302, H312, H332
Precautionary statements	P261, P264, P264+P265, P270, P271, P280, P301+P317, P302+P352, P304+P340, P305+P351+P338, P317, P319, P321, P330, P332+P317, P337+P317, P362+P364, P403+P233, P405, P501
- Except where otherwise noted, data are given for materials in their standard state (at 25 °C [77 °F], 100 kPa). Infobox references

4-Hydroxyphenylacetonitrile is a naturally occurring nitrile.

== Occurrence ==
4-Hydroxyphenylacetonitrile occurs alongside 4-hydroxybenzylisothiocyanate as a degradation product of glucosinalbin, which is found in white mustard. The cabbage butterfly, which feeds on cruciferous plants containing glucosinalbin, among other things, can evade the toxicity of isothiocyanate by specifically breaking down glucosinalbin to 4-hydroxyphenylacetonitrile, which it can further metabolize. The horseradish tree contains niazirine, a glycoside of 4-hydroxyphenylacetonitrile.

== Reactions ==
The hydrogenation of 4-hydroxyphenylacetonitrile under palladium catalysis yields tyramine.
