= Hydroxymandelonitrile glucosyltransferase =

Class of enzymes

Identifiers
- EC no.: 2.4.1.178
- CAS no.: 89287-39-8

Databases
- BRENDA: enzyme data
- ExPASy: NiceZyme view
- KEGG: enzyme entry
- MetaCyc: metabolic pathway
- Rhea: reactions
- PDB structures: RCSB PDB PDBe PDBsum
- Gene Ontology: AmiGO / QuickGO
Search
- PMC: articles
- PubMed: articles
- NCBI: proteins

Hydroxymandelonitrile glucosyltransferase (EC 2.4.1.178) is an enzyme that catalyzes the chemical reaction

4-hydroxymandelonitrile
+ UDP-glucose
UDP
taxiphyllin

The two substrates of this enzyme characterised from Triglochin maritima are 4-hydroxymandelonitrile and UDP-glucose. Its products are taxyphillin and uridine diphosphate (UDP). The enzyme is related to (R)-mandelonitrile β-glucosyltransferase (EC 2.4.1.354), which produces prunasin from mandelonitrile. These products are both cyanogenic glucosides.

This enzyme belongs to the family of glycosyltransferases, specifically the hexosyltransferases. The systematic name of this enzyme class is UDP-glucose:4-hydroxymandelonitrile glucosyltransferase. Other names in common use include cyanohydrin glucosyltransferase, and uridine diphosphoglucose-cyanohydrin glucosyltransferase.
