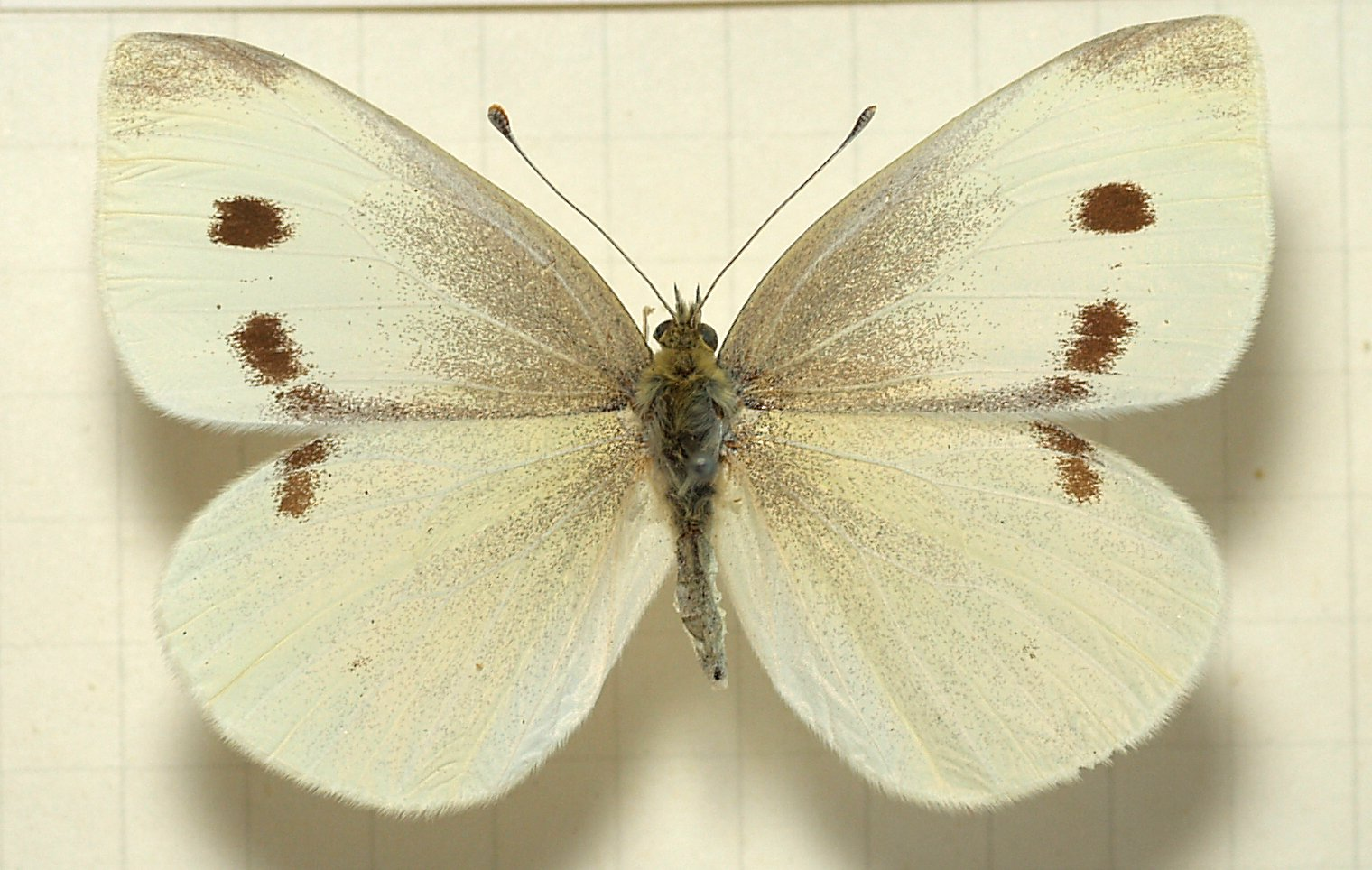
- Female
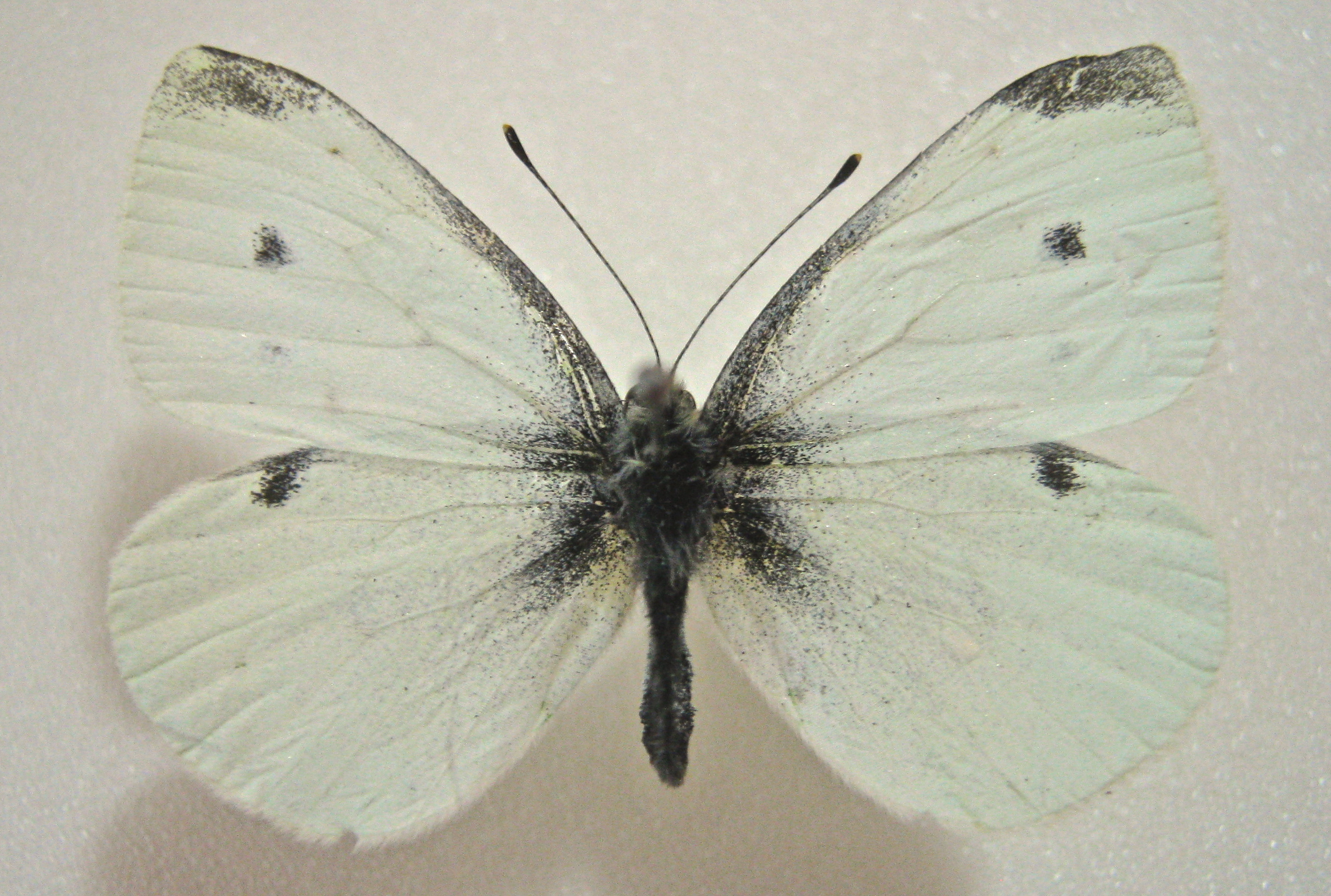
- Male

Conservation status
- Least Concern (IUCN 3.1)

- Secure (NatureServe)

Scientific classification
- Kingdom: Animalia
- Phylum: Arthropoda
- Clade: Pancrustacea
- Class: Insecta
- Order: Lepidoptera
- Family: Pieridae
- Genus: Pieris
- Species: P. rapae

Binomial name
- Pieris rapae (Linnaeus, 1758)

Synonyms
- Papilio rapae Linnaeus, 1758; Artogeia rapae (Linnaeus, 1758)

= Pieris rapae =

Small white

Species of butterfly

Pieris rapae is a small-to-medium-sized butterfly species of the whites-and-yellows family Pieridae. It is known in Europe as the small white, in North America and the United Kingdom as the cabbage white or cabbage butterfly, (Note: In Europe, "cabbage white" and "cabbage butterfly" refer instead to Pieris brassicae, also known as "large white") on several continents as the small cabbage white, and in New Zealand as the white butterfly. The butterfly is recognizable by its white color with small black dots on its wings, and it can be distinguished from P. brassicae by the latter's larger size and black band at the tip of the forewings.

The caterpillar of this species, often referred to as the "imported cabbageworm", is a pest to crucifer crops such as cabbage, kale, bok choy and broccoli. Pieris rapae is widespread in Europe and Asia; it is believed to have originated in the Eastern Mediterranean region of Europe and to have spread across Eurasia thanks to the diversification of brassicaceous crops and the development of human trade routes. Over the past two centuries, it spread to North Africa (about 1800), North America (1860s), Hawaii (1897), New Zealand (1930), and Australia (1937), as a result of accidental introductions.

== Description ==
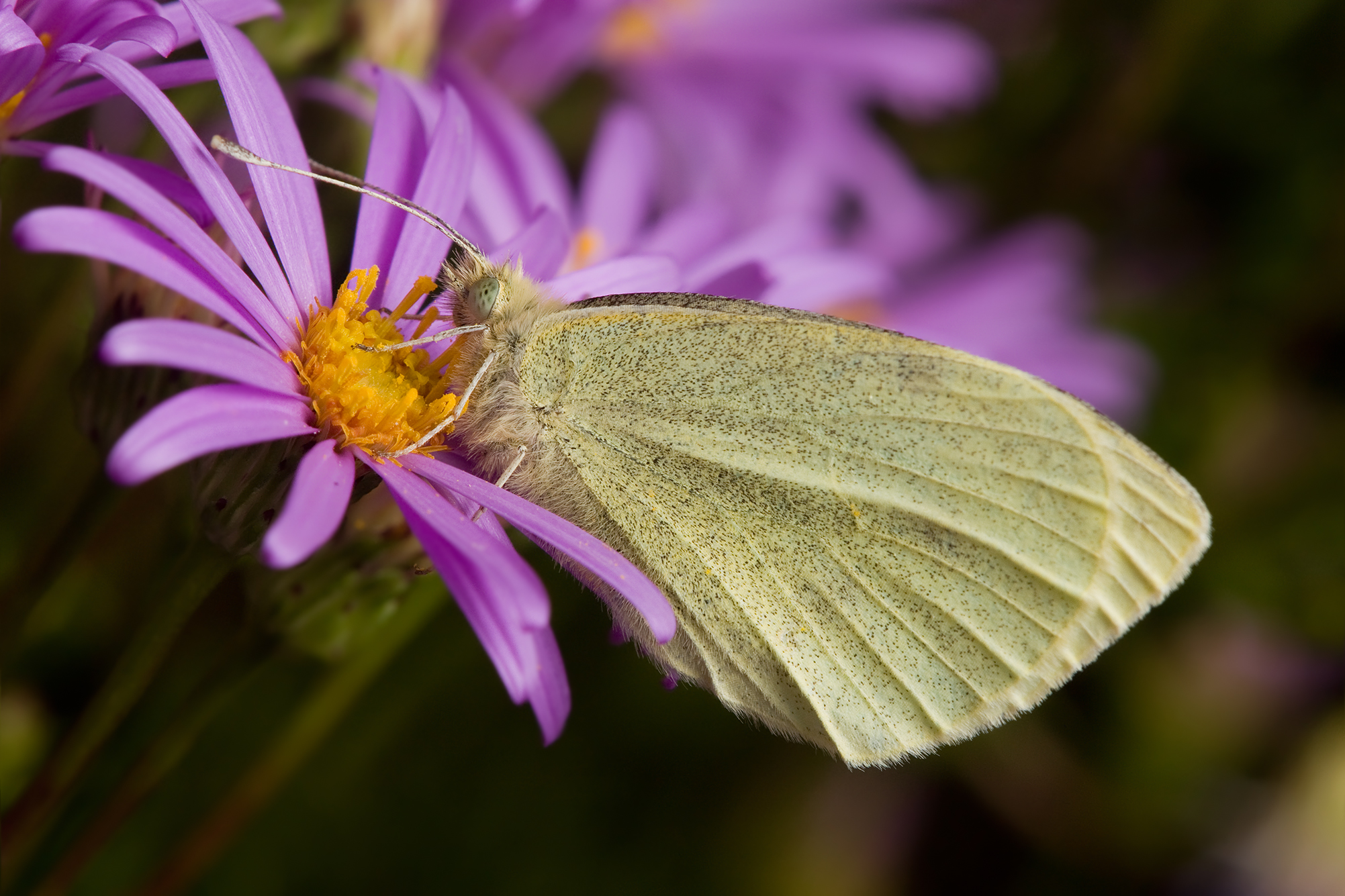
Feeding on the nectar of Aster amellus

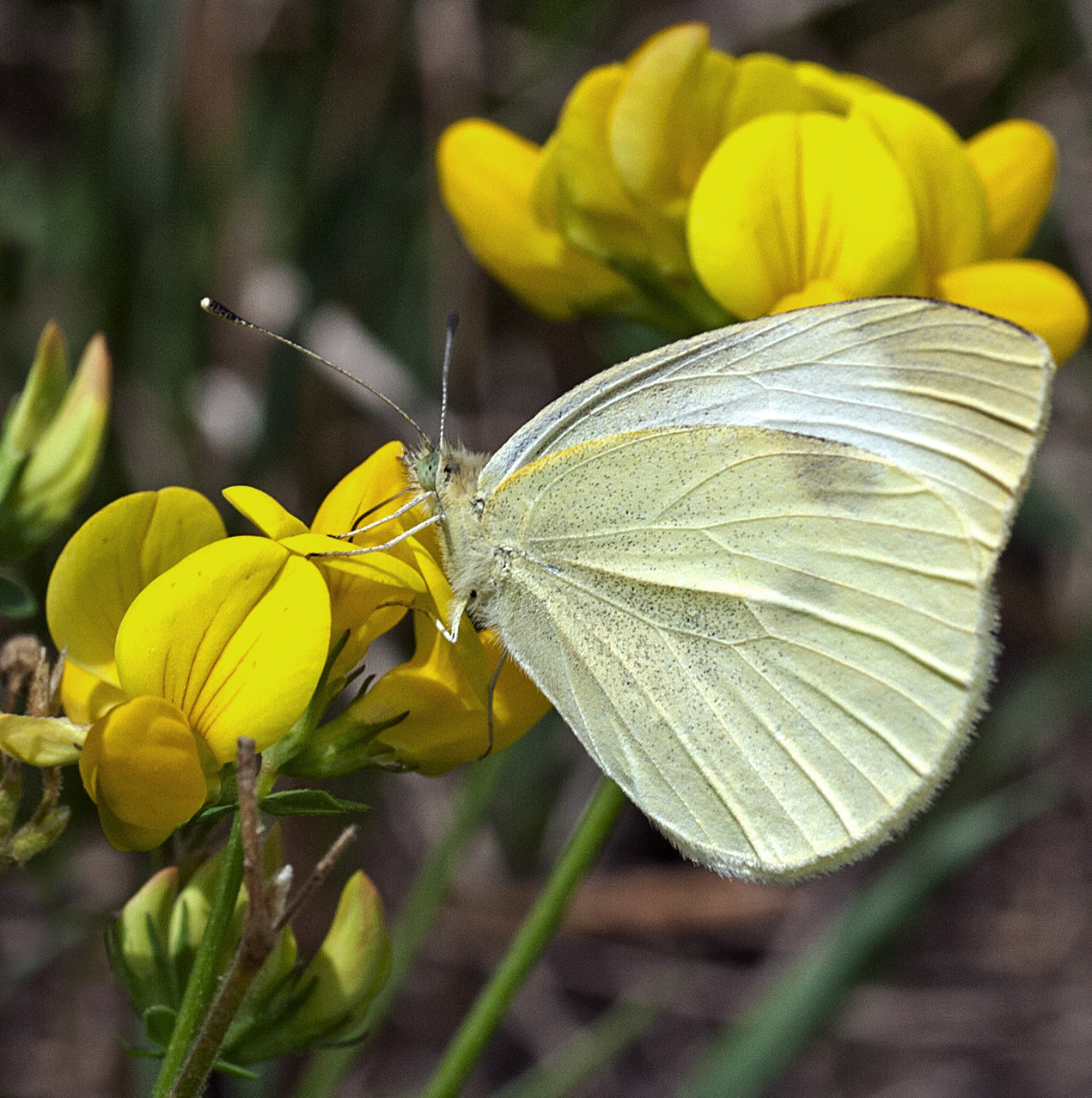
Cabbage white butterfly (Pieris rapae), wings closed

In appearance it looks like a smaller version of the large white (Pieris brassicae). The upperside is creamy white with black tips on the forewings. Females also have two black spots in the center of the forewings. Its underwings are yellowish with black speckles. It is sometimes mistaken for a moth due to its plain appearance. The wingspan of adults is roughly 32–47 mm (1.3–1.9 in).

Pieris rapae has a wingbeat frequency averaging 12.8 flaps per second.

== Distribution and habitat ==
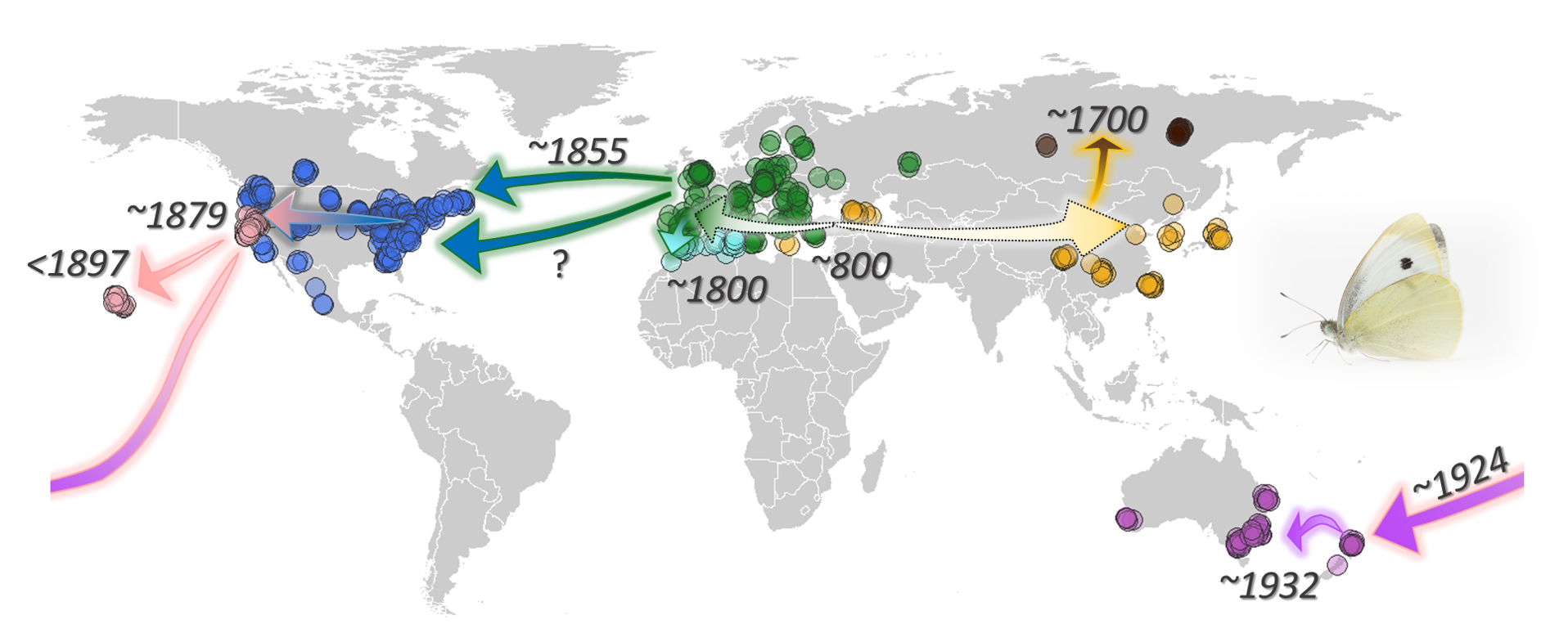
Global invasion history of Pieris rapae

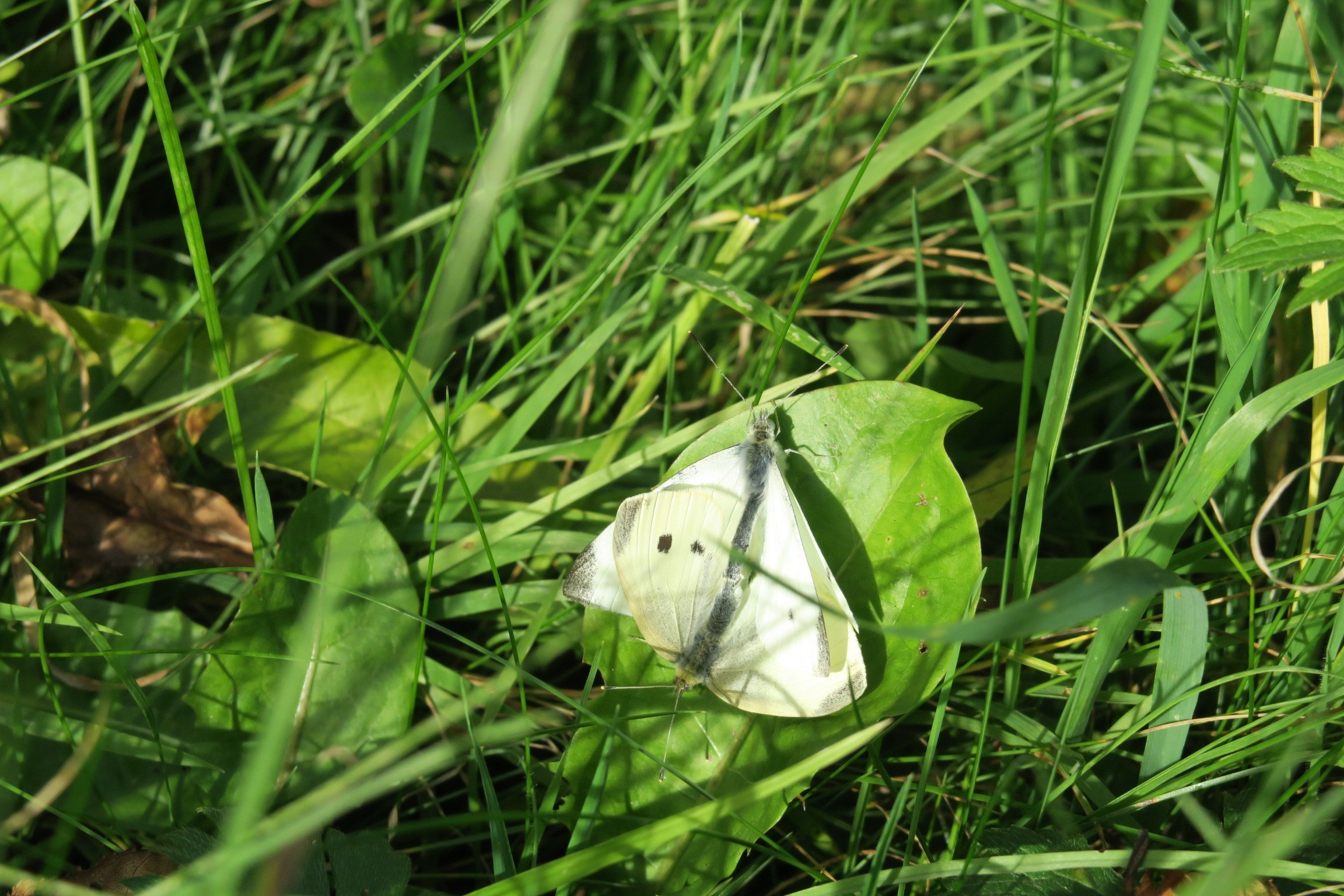
Small whites mating (German/Dutch border region)

The species has a natural range across Europe, Asia, and North Africa. It was accidentally introduced to Quebec, Canada, around 1860 and spread rapidly throughout North America. The species has spread to all North American life zones from Lower Austral/Lower Sonoran to Canada. Estimates show that a single female of this species might be the progenitor in a few generations of millions. It is absent or scarce in desert and semidesert regions (except for irrigated areas). It is not found north of Canadian life zone, nor on Channel Islands off the coast of southern California. By 1898, the small white had spread to Hawaii; by 1929, it had reached New Zealand and the area around Melbourne, Australia, and found its way to Perth as early as 1943. It does not seem to have made it to South America.

In Britain, it has two flight periods, April–May and July–August, but is continuously brooded in North America, being one of the first butterflies to emerge from the chrysalis in the spring and flying until hard freeze in the fall.

The species can be found in any open area with diverse plant association. It can be seen usually in towns, but also in natural habitats, mostly in valley bottoms. Although an affinity towards open areas is shown, the small white is found to have entered even small forest clearings in recent years.

The nominate subspecies P. r. rapae is found in Europe, while Asian populations are placed in the subspecies P. r. crucivora. Other subspecies include atomaria, eumorpha, leucosoma, mauretanica, napi, novangliae, and orientalis.

== Life cycle ==
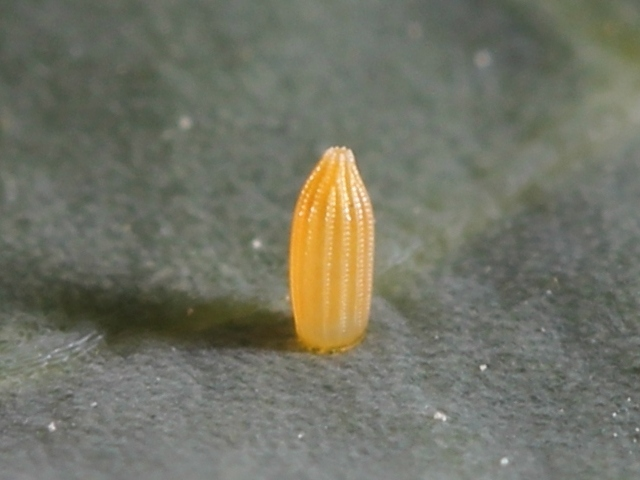
Egg

The small white will readily lay eggs on both cultivated and wild members of the cabbage family, such as charlock (Sinapis arvensis) and hedge mustard (Sisymbrium officinale). P. rapae is known to lay eggs singularly on the host plant. The egg is characterized by a yellowish color and 12 longitudinal ridges. The egg production peaks about a week after adulthood in lab and the female can live up to 3 weeks. Females tend to lay fewer eggs on plants in clumps than on isolated plants. It has been suggested that isothiocyanate compounds in the family Brassicaceae may have been evolved to reduce herbivory by caterpillars of the small white. However, this suggestion is not generally accepted because the small white has later been shown to be immune to the isothiocyanate forming reaction due to a specific biochemical adaptation. In contrast, the small white and relatives seem to have evolved as a consequence of this biochemical adaptation to the isothiocyanate-forming glucosinolates.

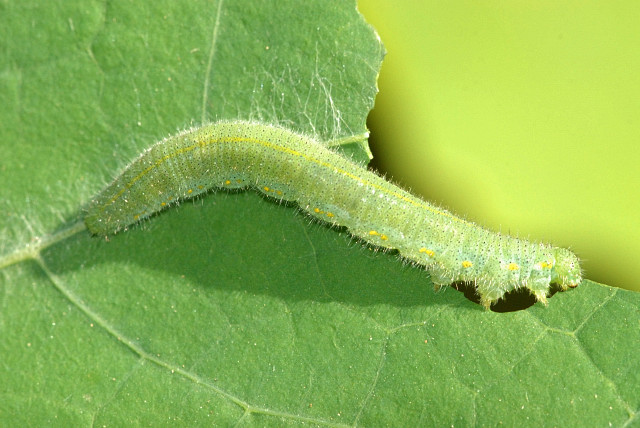
Caterpillar

Traditionally known in the United States as the imported cabbage worm, now more commonly the cabbage white, the caterpillars are bluish-green, with tiny black spots, a black ring around the spiracles, and a lateral row of yellow dashes, and a yellow middorsal line. Caterpillars rest on the undersides of the leaves, making them less visible to predators. Although the larval instars have not been fully studied, different instars are easily differentiated simply by comparing sizes, especially the head alone. During the first and second instar the head is entirely black; third instar has the clypeus yellow but the rest of the head black. In the fourth and fifth instar, there is a dark greenish-yellow dot behind each eye but with rest of the head black. However, the color of the caterpillar head does not necessarily indicate specific instar, as the time of color change is not fixed. In the larval stage, the small white can be a pest on cultivated cabbages, kale, radish, broccoli, and horseradish. The larva is considered a serious pest for commercial growth of cabbage and other Brassicaceae.

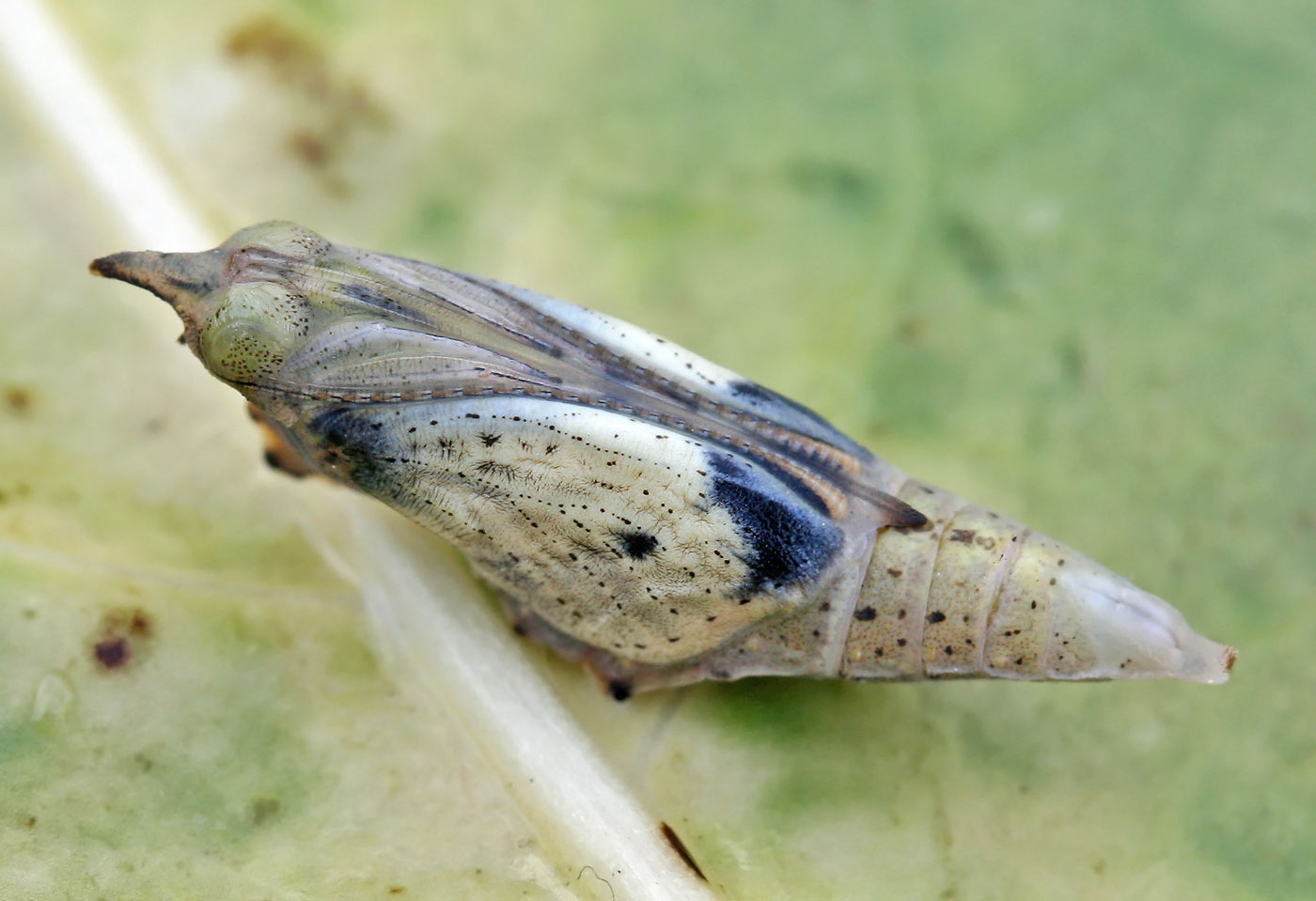
Pupa

The pupa of P. rapae is very similar to that of P. napi. It is brown to mottled-gray or yellowish, matching the background color. It has a large head cone, with a vertical abdomen and flared subdorsal ridge. The two (pupa of P. rapae and P. napi) can be easily distinguished by comparing the proboscis sheath. In P. rapae, the proboscis sheath extends far beyond the antennal sheath while in P. napi, only a very short distance.

Like its close relative the large white, the small white is a strong flyer and the British population is increased by continental immigrants in most years. Adults are diurnal and fly throughout the day, except for early morning and evening. Although there is occasional activity during the later part of the night, it ceases as dawn breaks. Adult P. rapae can move many kilometers in individual flights. Adults have been observed to fly as much as 12 km in one flight. On average, a female flies about 0.7 km per day and moves 0.45 km from where she starts. Males patrol all day around host plants to mate with females.

== Behavior and ecology ==
=== Larva feeding and role as pests ===
The P. rapae larva is voracious. Once it hatches from the egg, it eats its own eggshell and then moves to eat the leaves of the host plant. It bores into the interior of the cabbage, feeding on the new sprouts. The larvae adjust their feeding rate to maintain a constant rate of nitrogen uptake. They will feed faster in low nitrogen environment and utilize the nitrogen more efficiently (at the cost of efficiency in other nutrients) than larvae hatched on nitrogen high host plant. However, no significant difference in growth rate was observed between larvae in the two environments. Considered a serious pest, the caterpillar is known to be responsible for annual damage worth hundreds of thousands of dollars.

The larvae are shown to disperse their damage on the plant. Larvae are shown to feed mostly during the day. They move around the plant mostly spending their time feeding. A feeding bout is immediately followed by a change in position, either to a new leaf or to another part of the same leaf. This dispersal of damage is seen as an adaptive behavior to hide the visual cues from predators that rely on vision. Even though P. rapae larvae are cryptic, they remain in the sun for the majority of the day, rather than hiding on the underside of the leaf. The condition of the host plant influences the larval growth significantly.

Larval duration, pupal weights, adult weights, and larval growth rates were significantly altered by both plant nutrient availability and plant species. Larvae preferred Brassicaceae plants over other host plants. Larvae that have previously fed on crucifers will refuse nasturtium leaves to the point of starving to death. Within the family Brassicaceae, larvae show no significant difference in feeding behavior; larvae placed on kale show no difference from larvae placed on Brussels sprouts.

Survival rates do not differ depending on nutrition availability of host plant. Elevated plant nutrient levels decrease larval duration and increase larval growth rate. The elevated nutrition level also decreased the fourth instar's consumption rate and increased its food utilization efficiencies. Larvae on cultivated host plant was observed to have higher growth efficiency than those fed in foliage of wild species. In short, larvae fed on high nutrition foliage show shorter duration of development, less consumption rate, higher growth rate and food processing efficiency.

=== Adult feeding ===
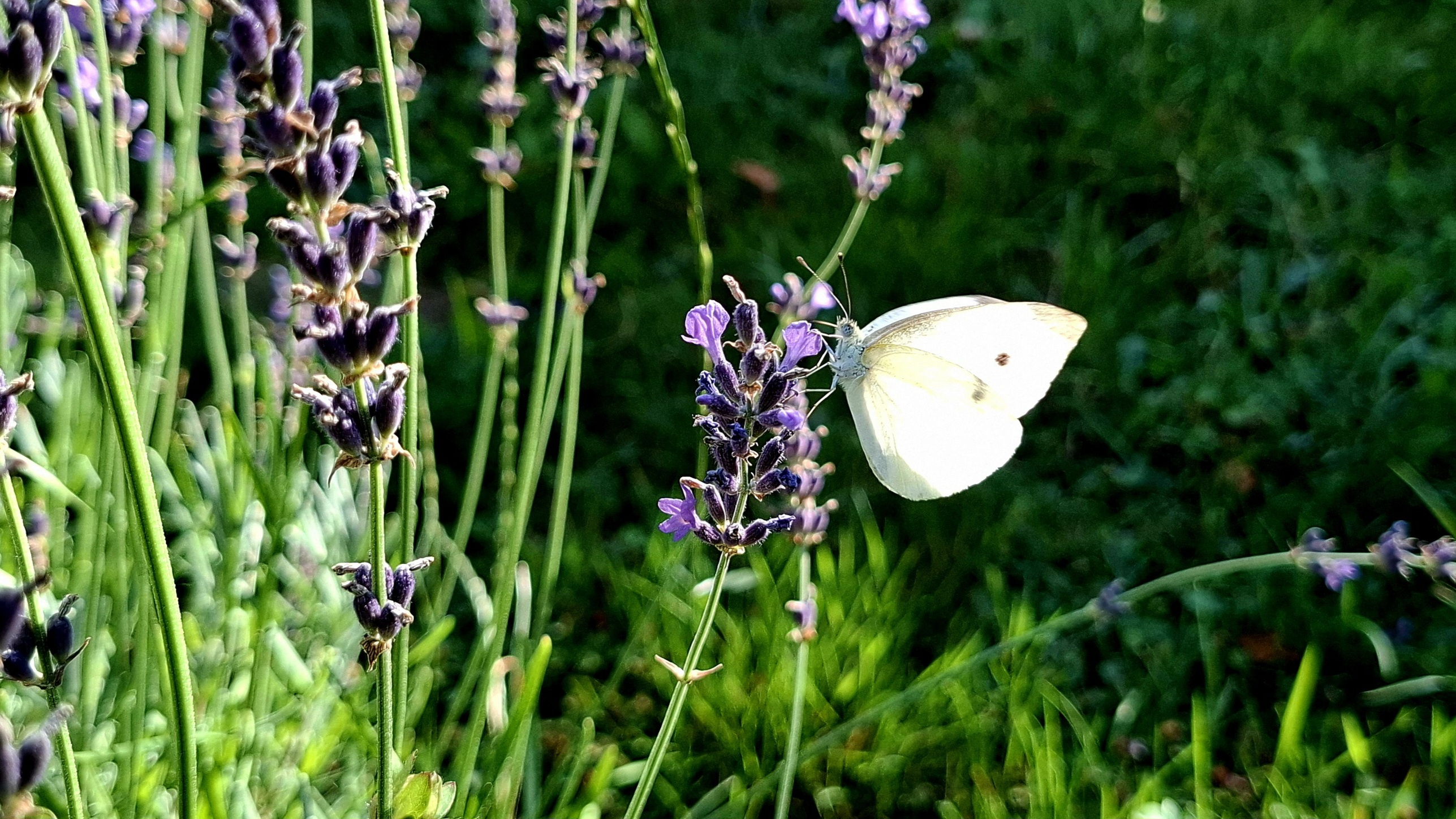
Pieris rapae feeding on a lavender flower

Adult P. rapae use both visual and olfactory cues to identify flowers in their foraging flight. The cabbage butterfly prefers purple, blue, and yellow flowers over other floral colors. Some flowers, like Brassica rapa, have a UV guide which aids the butterfly in search for nectar where the petals reflect near UV light, whereas the center of the flower absorbs UV light, creating a visible dark center in the flower when seen in UV condition. This UV guide plays a significant role in P. rapae foraging.

The adult flies around feeding from nectars of the plant. The adult looks for certain colors among green vegetation (purple, blue, and yellow preferred to white, red, and green) and extends the proboscis before landing. It probes for nectar after landing. The butterfly identifies the flower through vision and odor. Chemical compounds such as Phenylacetaldehyde or 2-Phenylethanol were shown to provoke reflex proboscis extension. The search for nectar is also limited by the memory constraint. An adult butterfly shows a flower constancy in foraging, visiting flower species that it has already experienced. The ability to find nectar from the flower increases over time, showing a certain learning curve. Furthermore, the ability to find nectar from the first flower species decreased if the adult butterfly started to feed on nectar from other plant species.

=== Courtship and reproduction ===
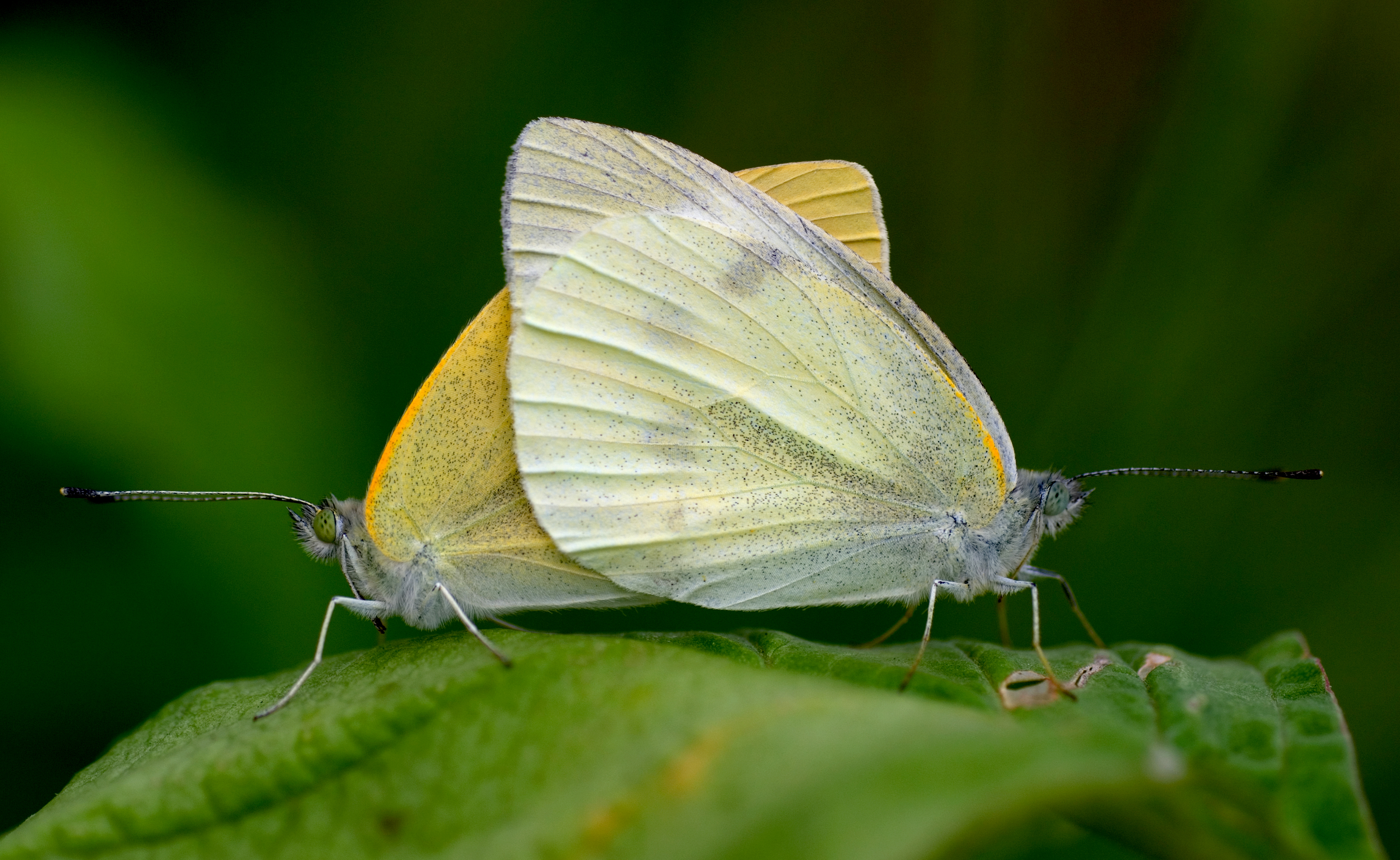
Copulating pair

The male, when it spots a female, zigzags up, down, below, and in front of her, flying until she lands. The male flutters, catches her closed forewings with his legs, and spreads his wings. This causes her to lean over. He usually flies a short distance with her dangling beneath him. An unreceptive female may fly vertically or spread her wings and raise the abdomen to reject the male. Most host plants of P. rapae contain mustard oils and females use these oils to locate the plants. Females then lay the eggs singly on host leaves. In the northern hemisphere, adults appear as early as March and they continue to brood well into October. Spring adults have smaller black spots on their wings and are generally smaller than summer adults.

Males seem to benefit from the sodium uptake through mud-puddling behaviour with an increase in reproductive success.

=== Host selection ===
All known host plants contain natural chemicals called glucosinolates, that are cues for egg laying. Host plants are: herb Cruciferae – Arabis glabra, Armoracia lapthifolia, Armoracia aquatica, Barbarea vulgaris, Barbarea orthoceras, Barbarea verna, Brassica oleracea, Brassica rapa, Brassica caulorapa, Brassica napus, Brassica juncea, Brassica hirta, Brassica nigra, Brassica tula, Cardaria draba, Capsella bursa-pastoris (females oviposit but larvae refuse it), Dentaria diphylla, Descurainia Sophia, Eruca sativa, Erysimum perenne, Lobularia maritima, Lunaria annua (retards larval growth), Matthiola incana, Nasturtium officinale, Raphanus sativus, Raphanus raphanistrum, Rorippa curvisiliqua, Rorippa islandica, Sisymbrium irio, Sisymbrium altissimum, Sisymbrium officinale (and var. leicocarpum), Streptanthus tortuosus, Thlaspi arvense (larvae grow slowly or refuse it); Capparidaceae: Cleome serrulata, Capparis sandwichiana; Tropaeolaceae: Tropaeolum majus; Resedaceae: Reseda odorata.

There are three phases to host selection by the P. rapae adult female butterfly: searching, landing, and contact evaluation. A gravid female adult will first locate suitable habitats, and then identify patches of vegetation that contain potential host plants. The cabbage butterflies seem to limit their search to open areas and avoid cool, shaded woodlands even when host plants are available in these areas. Furthermore, gravid females will not oviposit during overcast or rainy weather. In laboratory conditions, high light intensity is required to promote oviposition. The females fly in a linear path independent of wind direction or position of the sun.

==== Host plant searching behavior ====
Pre-mating females do not display host plant searching behavior. The behavior starts soon after mating. Flight behavior of an ovipositing female of P. rapae follows the Markov process. Females foraging for nectar will readily abandon a linear path; they will show tight turns concentrating on flower patches. Females searching for host plant, however, will follow a linear route. As a result of directionality, the number of eggs laid per plant declines with increases in host plant density. The average move length declined as host plant density increases, but the decline is not enough to concentrate eggs on a dense host plant. Although females avoid laying eggs on plants or leaves with other eggs or larvae in a lab condition; this discrimination is not shown in field conditions.

Adult females may search for a suitable Brassicaceae over a range of 500 m to several kilometers.

Small differences in flight patterns have been observed in Canadian and Australian P. rapae, indicating that there may be slight variation among different geographic populations.

Pieris rapae in Tokyo, 2020

==== Plant preference ====
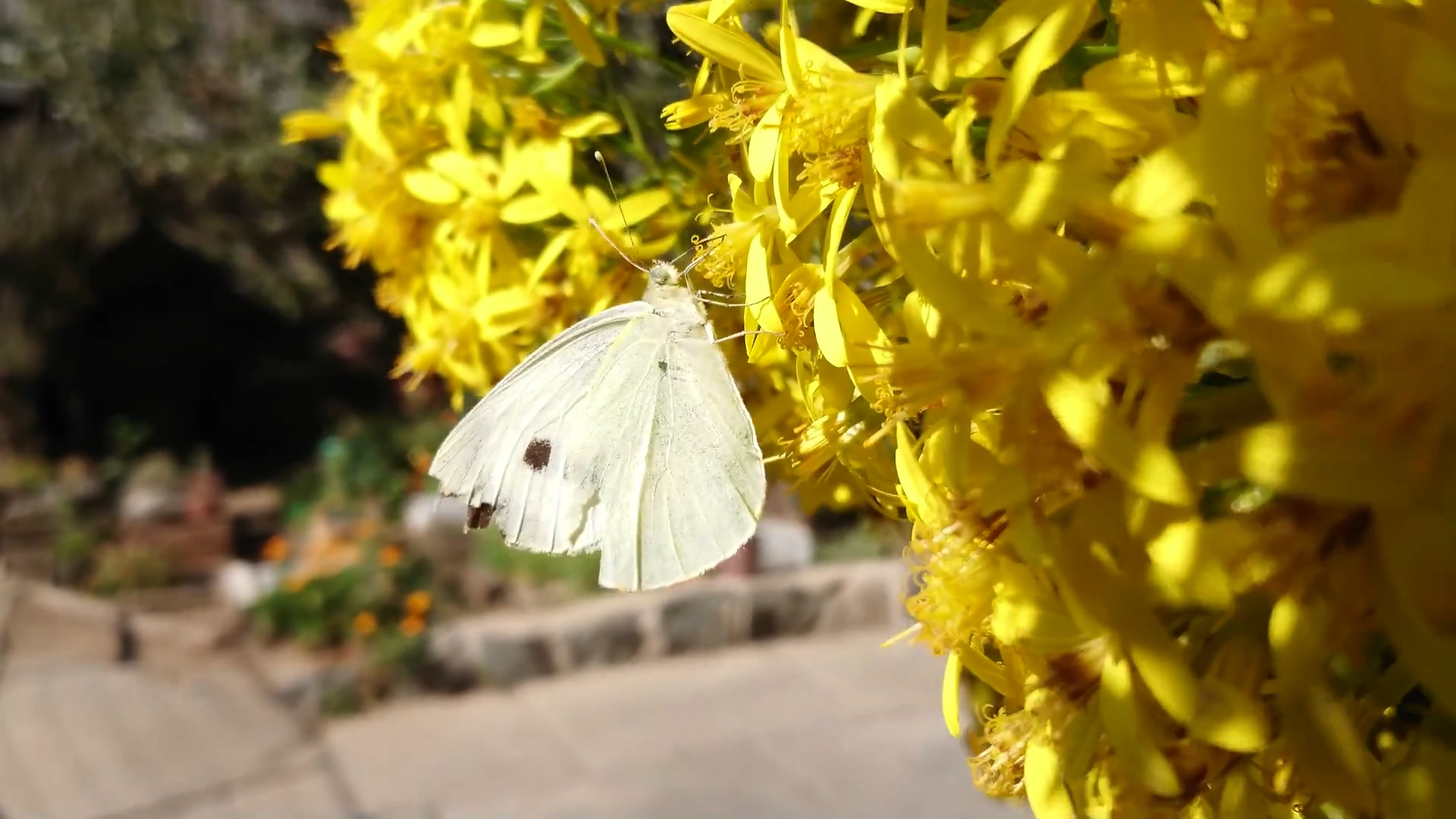
Pollinating the flowers of Senecio tamoides

Landing appears to be mediated primarily by visual cues, of which color is the most important. P. rapae in a lab environment showed no significant preference for the shape or size of the oviposition substrate. Gravid females responded most positively to green and blue/green colors for oviposition. The preference was shown for surfaces with maximal reflectance of 550 nm. In natural conditions, oviposition was preferred on larger plants, but this was not reflected in laboratory conditions. Younger plants often had yellow/green color while older plants display a darker and stronger green. Female butterflies preferred the older plants due to the attraction to the darker green color. However, larvae perform better on younger plants.

==== Behavior on plant ====
Once a gravid female lands on a plant, tactile and contact chemical stimuli are major factors affecting acceptance or rejection of the site for egg deposition. Once a female lands on a host plant, it will go through a "drumming reaction" or a rapid movement of the forelegs across the surface of a leaf. This behavior is believed to provide physical and chemical information about the suitability of a plant. P. rapae is shown to prefer smooth hard surfaces similar to a surface of an index card over rougher softer textures like blotting paper or felt. P. rapae use their chemoreceptors on their tarsi to search for chemical cues from the host plant. An adult female will be sensitive to number of glucosinolates, gluconasturtiin being the most effective glucosinolate stimulants for these sensilla.

==== Egg-laying behavior ====
A gravid female adult will lay disproportionate number of eggs on peripheral or isolated plants. A single larva is less likely to exhaust the whole plant, therefore laying eggs singly prevents the likelihood of larval starvation from resource exhaustion. This behavior may have evolved to exploit the original vegetation in the eastern Mediterranean where brassica plants originated.

Age of butterflies appears to have no effect on their ability to select the source of highest concentration of oviposition stimulant.

Additionally, it has been shown that the weather has a large impact on the eggs of P. rapae. The main issues with the weather are that strong winds can blow eggs from the leaves and strong rains can drown the caterpillars.

=== Larval growth ===
Larvae feeding and growth is highly dependent on their body temperature. While the larvae survives from as low as 10 °C, the growth of larvae changes with changing temperature. From 10 °C to 35 °C, growth increases, but declines rapidly at temperatures higher than 35 °C. Past 40 °C, larvae start showing substantial mortality. The diurnal variation of temperature can be extensive with daily range of more than 20 °C on some sunny days and clear nights. Larvae are able to respond well to a wide range of temperature condition, which allows them to inhabit various locations in the world. In natural conditions, larvae shows fastest growth at temperatures close to 35 °C. however, in constant temperature conditions in laboratory, larvae shows mortality at 35 °C. In this lab condition, larvae grows between 10 °C to 30.5 °C while showing maximal developmental rate at 30.5 °C. The difference between lab and natural condition is due to routine temperature changes on the scale of minutes to hours under field conditions.

== Predation ==
Studies in Britain showed that birds are a major predator in British town and city environments (such as in gardens) while arthropods had larger influence in rural areas. Bird predators include the house sparrow (Passer domesticus), goldfinch (Carduelis carduelis) and skylark (Alauda arvensis). Caterpillars are cryptic, coloured as green as the host plant leaves and they rest on the undersides of the leaves, thus making them less visible to predators. Unlike the large white, they are not distasteful to predators like birds. Like many other "white" butterflies, they overwinter as a pupa. Bird predation is usually evident only in late-instar larvae or on overwintering pupae.

=== Parasitism ===
P. rapae caterpillars are commonly parasitized by a variety of insects. The four main parasitoids are braconid wasps Cotesia rubecula and Cotesia glomerata, and flies Phryxe vulgaris, and Epicampocera succinata. Cotesia rubecula and Cotesia glomerata, previously in the genus Apanteles, were introduced in North America from Asia as biocontrols. C. rubecula lays its eggs in the 1st and 2nd instar caterpillars. The larva then grows within the caterpillar and continues to feed on the caterpillar until it is almost fully grown, and at that point the caterpillar is killed. Only one larva develops per host and the rate of C. rubecula is largely independent of P. rapae population size. C. glomerata is similar to C. rubecula in that both parasitize the host in either the 1st or 2nd instar. The main difference is that C. glomerata always kill the host in the 5th instar and multiple larvae can be raised within one host.

P. rapae pupae are frequently parasitized by Pteromalus puparum.

== Gallery ==
Emerging from egg and first feedings.

Second instar larvae eating. Speeded up 50 times to illustrate feeding behavior. This species first and second instar larvae's nearly transparent body shows internal digestion.

This species second instar larvae sheds skin in under 20 minutes.

Larvae eating remainder of a leaf. Six hours speeded up one hundred times.

Segments of the last two hours of the larvae shedding its 4th instar skin, after starting a few hours earlier.

Fifth instar white cabbage larvae walking on broccoli stem and on glass, showing it laying down silk it then walks on.

Parasitized larvae showing wasp larvae exiting its body, spinning cocoons. Playback at double speed. Adult wasps at normal speed.

Larvae shedding skin, becoming a chrysalis. Recorded over fifteen hours. Closeups at two times speed. Other clips at ten times speed.

Emerging from chrysalis into an adult.

Butterflies flying. Later clips in slow motion.

Male butterflies mud-puddling to concentrate salts for female reproduction.

Butterflies depositing eggs under leaves. Each repeated in slow motion.
