= Tyrosine N-monooxygenase =

Class of enzymes

Identifiers
- EC no.: 1.14.14.36
- CAS no.: 159447-19-5

Databases
- IntEnz: IntEnz view
- BRENDA: BRENDA entry
- ExPASy: NiceZyme view
- KEGG: KEGG entry
- MetaCyc: metabolic pathway
- PRIAM: profile
- PDB structures: RCSB PDB PDBe PDBsum
Search
- PMC: articles
- PubMed: articles
- NCBI: proteins

Tyrosine N-monooxygenase (EC 1.14.14.36, tyrosine N-hydroxylase, CYP79A1) is an enzyme with systematic name L-tyrosine,NADPH:oxygen oxidoreductase (N-hydroxylating). This enzyme catalyses a sequence of chemical reactions starting from the amino acid L-tyrosine.

The first is an oxidation using molecular oxygen as oxidant and gives N-hydroxytyrosine:

tyrosine
+ NADPH
O_{2} + H^{+}
H_{2}O
N-hydroxytyrosine
+ NADP^{+}

The enzyme is a cytochrome P450 type of hemoprotein which contains reduced nicotinamide adenine dinucleotide phosphate (NADPH) as a cofactor.

Another similar oxidation step leads to N,N-dihydroxy-L-tyrosine, which loses carbon dioxide and water to give (E)-(4-hydroxyphenyl)acetaldehyde oxime as the final product of the enzyme.

N-hydroxytyrosine
O_{2} + H^{+}
H_{2}O
N,N-dihydroxy-L-tyrosine
CO_{2} + H_{2}O
(E)-(4-hydroxyphenyl)acetaldehyde oxime

Cyanogenic glycoside, dhurrin

In plants such as sorghum, the product goes on to form the cyanogenic glycoside, dhurrin after the (E) isomer of the oxime is converted to its (Z) form and further transformed.
