= Dhurrin =

Names
- IUPAC name (S)-(β-D-Glucopyranosyloxy)(4-hydroxyphenyl)acetonitrile
- Systematic IUPAC name (S)-(4-Hydroxyphenyl){[(2R,3R,4S,5S,6R)-3,4,5-trihydroxy-6-(hydroxymethyl)oxan-2-yl]oxy}acetonitrile
- Other names (S)-4-Hydroxymandelnitrile-β-D-glucopyranoside

Identifiers
| CAS Number | 499-20-7 |
| 3D model (JSmol) | Interactive image |
| ChemSpider | 141737 |
| ECHA InfoCard | 100.007.163 |
| PubChem CID | 161355 |
| UNII | P5999IY65C |
| CompTox Dashboard (EPA) | DTXSID90198142 |
- InChI: InChI=1S/C14H17NO7/c15-5-9(7-1-3-8(17)4-2-7)21-14-13(20)12(19)11(18)10(6-16)22-14/h1-4,9-14,16-20H,6H2/t9-,10-,11-,12+,13-,14-/m1/s1 Key: NVLTYOJHPBMILU-YOVYLDAJSA-N; InChI=1/C14H17NO7/c15-5-9(7-1-3-8(17)4-2-7)21-14-13(20)12(19)11(18)10(6-16)22-14/h1-4,9-14,16-20H,6H2/t9-,10-,11-,12+,13-,14-/m1/s1 Key: NVLTYOJHPBMILU-YOVYLDAJBT
- SMILES: C1=CC(=CC=C1[C@@H](C#N)O[C@H]2[C@@H]([C@H]([C@@H]([C@H](O2)CO)O)O)O)O

Properties
| Chemical formula | C_{14}H_{17}NO_{7} |
| Molar mass | 311.29 g/mol |
- Except where otherwise noted, data are given for materials in their standard state (at 25 °C [77 °F], 100 kPa). verify (what is ?) Infobox references

Dhurrin is a cyanogenic glycoside produced in many plants. Discovered in multiple sorghum varieties in 1906 as the culprit of cattle poisoning by hydrogen cyanide, dhurrin is most typically associated with Sorghum bicolor, the organism used for mapping the biosynthesis of dhurrin from tyrosine. Dhurrin's name is derived from the Arabic word for sorghum.

== Biosynthesis ==
=== Regulation in Sorghum bicolor ===
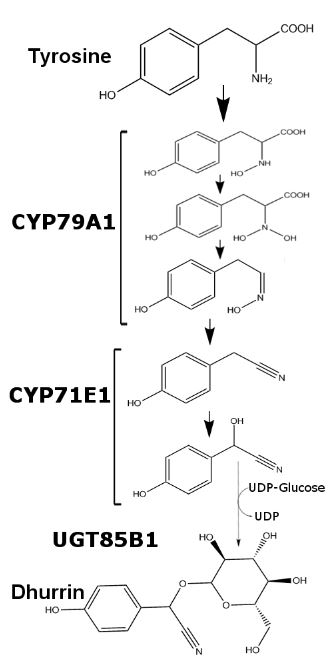
Starting with tyrosine, CYP79A1 and CYP71E1 alter the compound before UGT85B1 transfers glucose to form dhurrin.

In Sorghum bicolor, dhurrin production is regulated at the transcriptional level and varies depending on the plant's age and available nutrients. Dhurrin content within S. bicolor can be correlated to the amount of mRNA and translated protein of enzymes CYP79A1 and CYP71E1, two membrane bound members of the cytochrome P450 superfamily. While transcription and translation of these two enzymes is relatively higher for the first few days of growth, transcription is greatly reduced past one week of growth. After five weeks of growth, transcription and translation of both enzymes in the leaves becomes undetectable, while stems in said plants maintain the minimal production of both enzymes. With the addition of excess nitrate, transcription of both enzymes increases, though not to the levels seen in early development. The last enzyme in dhurrin synthesis, UGT85B1, is a soluble enzyme which exchanges glucose from UDP-glucose to the aglycone of dhurrin and forms the glycosidic bond.

=== Transgenic synthesis ===
Addition of both CYP79A1 and CYP71E1 into the genomes of Arabidopsis thaliana and Nicotiana tabacum has been shown to be sufficient for Dhurrin production to occur. Both of these enzymes are sufficient and necessary for Dhurrin production, as removal of the CYP79A1 gene from the Sorghum bicolor genome results in plants lacking dhurrin content. This strain could theoretically be used as a safer crop for fodder in arid environments where sorghum is the only available grain. In vitro biosynthesis of dhurrin has been constructed in both microsomes recovered from Sorghum bicolor seedlings and in micelles.

== Toxicity ==
=== Mammals ===
Mammalian intestines contain multiple glucosidases which efficiently hydrolyze glycosidic bonds. Upon hydrolysis of the glycosidic bond, the aglycone of dhurrin rapidly degrades to form hydrogen cyanide which is then absorbed into the bloodstream. Lethal dosage of dhurrin in humans and other mammals is theoretically high as one molecule of hydrogen cyanide is produced per molecule of dhurrin. Content of dhurrin by mass in sorghum is relatively low with respect to overall plant matter. As such, it would require a human to eat a considerably large amount of raw sorghum before experiencing adverse effects. In arid environments, sorghum is the best option for cereal grain and fodder as it can withstand extreme drought conditions. Animals consuming the raw sorghum as fodder are much more likely to eat an amount that would contain a lethal dosage of dhurrin for their respective species and can result in animal loss due to hydrogen cyanide poisoning.

=== As an insect repellent ===
In response to external damage to the stem, sorghum varieties can release dhurrin at the damage site. This response has been shown to repel insects as transgenic sorghum made unable to produce dhurrin was heavily favored by herbivorous insects when compared to wild-type sorghum varieties.
