= List of fellows of the Royal Society elected in 2020 =

This article lists fellows of the Royal Society who were elected in 2020.

== Fellows ==
1. Timothy Behrens
2. Yoshua Bengio
3. Malcolm J. Bennett
4. Ben Berks FRS, University of Oxford
5. Zulfiqar Bhutta
6. Kevin Brindle
7. Gordon Brown FMedSci FRS, University of Exeter
8. William C. Campbell
9. Henry N. Chapman
10. G. Marius Clore
11. Vikram Deshpande
12. John Endler
13. Adam Eyre-Walker
14. Daniel Frost
15. François Guillemot
16. David Harel
17. Marian Holness
18. Ehud Hrushovski
19. Andrew P. Jackson FRS, University of Edinburgh
20. George Jackson
21. Xin Lu
22. Alexander Makarov
23. Keith Matthews
24. Iain McCulloch
25. Linda Nazar
26. Peter Nellist
27. Giles Oldroyd
28. Hugh Osborn
29. Oliver Phillips
30. Raymond Pierrehumbert
31. John Plane
32. Cathy J. Price
33. Carol Prives
34. Didier Queloz
35. Nicholas Read
36. Michael Rudnicki
37. William Schafer
38. Nigel Scrutton
39. John Shine
40. Stephen Smartt
41. Ralf Speth
42. Molly Stevens
43. Donna Strickland
44. Andrew M. Stuart
45. Sarah Teichmann
46. Richard Thompson
47. Jack Thorne
48. Nicholas Turner
49. Jane Visvader
50. Alan M. Wilson FRS, Royal Veterinary College
51. Steve Young

== Honorary Fellows ==
1. David Cooksey

== Foreign Members ==
1. Frances Arnold ForMemRS
2. Francis Collins ForMemRS
3. Kerry Emanuel ForMemRS
4. Ben Feringa ForMemRS
5. Else Marie Friis ForMemRS
6. Regine Kahmann ForMemRS
7. Margaret Kivelson ForMemRS
8. Ramamoorthy Ramesh ForMemRS
9. Wendelin Werner ForMemRS
10. Ada Yonath ForMemRS
