= Kevin Brindle =

British biochemist (born 1955)

Kevin Michael Brindle FMedSci FRS
- Born: 27 August 1955 (age 71)
- Education: University of Oxford
- Known for: Magnetic resonance imaging
- Scientific career
- Fields: Biochemistry; Medical imaging
- Workplaces: University of Oxford; University of Manchester; University of Cambridge
- Website: Official website

Kevin Michael Brindle (born 27 August 1955) is a British biochemist who is Emeritus Professor of Biomedical Magnetic Resonance in the Department of Biochemistry at the University of Cambridge and a Senior Group Leader at Cancer Research UK. He is known for developing magnetic resonance imaging (MRI) techniques for use in cell biochemistry and new imaging methods for early detection, monitoring, and treatment of cancer.

== Early life and career ==
Brindle took his BA in Biochemistry at Oxford University in 1978, before earning a D.Phil in 1982. He became a Royal Society University Research Fellow, also at Oxford, in 1986. Four years later, he took up a lectureship at Manchester University. He became a lecturer at Cambridge in 1993 and has been a professor there since 2005.

== Research interests ==
Brindle's research focuses on the use and development of new kinds of magnetic resonance imaging for investigating the biochemistry of cells, most recently in the early detection, monitoring of progression, and treatment of tumours. He has developed and patented a novel imaging agent for detecting cell death. He has also worked on the development of hyperpolarized carbon-13 MRI in cancer treatment, which involves injecting a carbon-13-labelled molecule into a tumour and using MRI to monitor how quickly it is growing or dying following drug treatment. Brindle estimates the technique to be between 10,000 and 100,000 times more sensitive than conventional techniques such as magnetic resonance spectroscopy and magnetic resonance spectroscopic imaging, and its main advantage is that it can show whether cancer drugs are working within days rather than weeks or months. It has been tested on numerous different types of cancer, including lung, brain, oesophageal, and breast cancers.

== Awards ==
Brindle has received numerous awards and recognition for his work, including the European Society for Molecular Imaging (ESMI) Award in 2013 and the Gold Medal of the World Molecular Imaging Society the following year. He was elected a Fellow of the Academy of Medical Sciences in 2012, to the European Academy of Cancer Sciences in 2014, and became a Fellow of the Royal Society in 2020. He served as President of the European Society for Molecular Imaging from 2018 to 2019. Brindle holds three patents on medical imaging.

== Selected publications ==
- Stincone, Anna; Prigione, Alessandro; Cramer, Thorsten; Wamelink, Mirjam M. C.; Campbell, Kate; et al. (22 September 2014). "The return of metabolism: biochemistry and physiology of the pentose phosphate pathway". Biological Reviews. 90 (3): 927–963. doi:10.1111/brv.12140. eISSN 1469-185X. ISSN 1464-7931. PMC 4470864. PMID 25243985.
- Gallagher, Ferdia A.; Kettunen, Mikko I.; Day, Sam E.; Hu, De-En; Ardenkjær-Larsen, Jan Henrik; et al. (28 May 2008). "Magnetic resonance imaging of pH in vivo using hyperpolarized 13C-labelled bicarbonate". Nature. 453 (7197): 940–943. Bibcode:2008Natur.453..940G. doi:10.1038/nature07017. eISSN 1476-4687. ISSN 0028-0836. PMID 18509335. S2CID 4405157.
- Brindle, Kevin (February 2008). "New approaches for imaging tumour responses to treatment". Nature Reviews Cancer. 8 (2): 94–107. doi:10.1038/nrc2289. eISSN 1474-1768. ISSN 1474-175X. PMID 18202697. S2CID 2710205.
- Day, Sam E; Kettunen, Mikko I; Gallagher, Ferdia A; Hu, De-En; Lerche, Mathilde; et al. (28 October 2007). "Detecting tumor response to treatment using hyperpolarized 13C magnetic resonance imaging and spectroscopy". Nature Medicine. 13 (11): 1382–1387. doi:10.1038/nm1650. eISSN 1546-170X. ISSN 1078-8956. PMID 17965722. S2CID 11576068.
- Raamsdonk, Léonie M.; Teusink, Bas; Broadhurst, David; Zhang, Nianshu; Hayes, Andrew; et al. (January 2001). "A functional genomics strategy that uses metabolome data to reveal the phenotype of silent mutations". Nature Biotechnology. 19 (1): 45–50. doi:10.1038/83496. eISSN 1546-1696. ISSN 1087-0156. PMID 11135551. S2CID 15491882.

== See also ==
- Hyperpolarized carbon-13 MRI
- Dynamic nuclear polarization
- Magnetic resonance imaging
