= Anton Windfelder =

German zoologist and immunologist

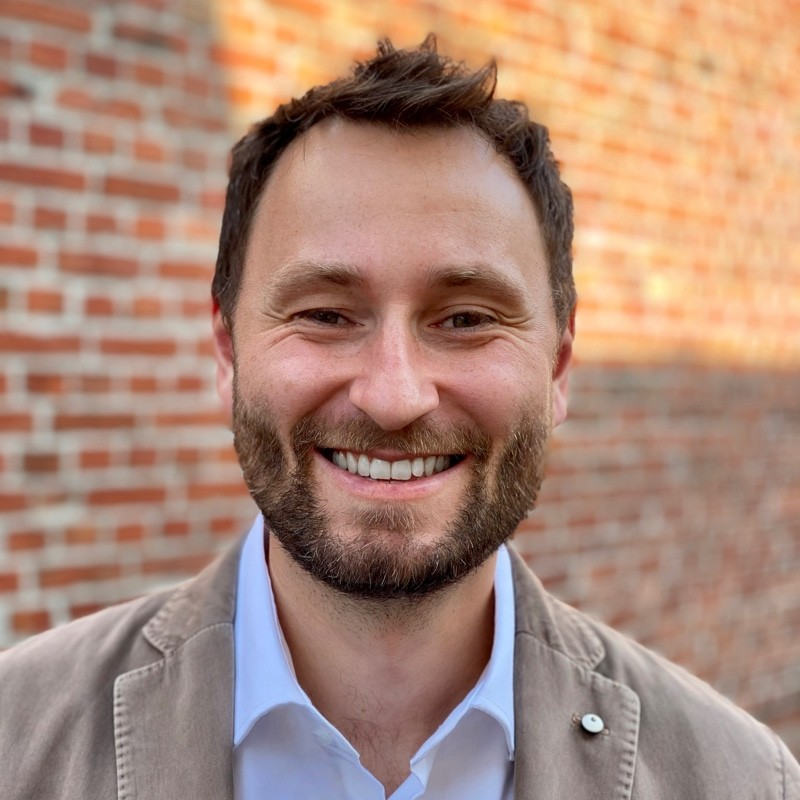
Anton Windfelder

Anton George Windfelder is a German zoologist and immunologist whose primary research interests include functional imaging of insects.

== Life ==
Windfelder became known after he established the caterpillars of the tobacco hornworm (Manduca sexta) as an alternative animal model for medical research. His work has received international attention and helps to reduce the number of mammals in medical research according to the 3R principle.

Windfelder was born in Berlin, where he also graduated from high school. After this, Windfelder studied biology at the Justus-Liebig University in Giessen, with a major in zoology, and became scientifically active early on during his studies. After graduation, Windfelder became a research associate at the Institute of General Zoology and Developmental Biology in the research group for cellular recognition and defense processes led by Tina Trenczek.

Windfelder received his doctorate in 2021 on the topic "High-throughput screening of insect larvae as a replacement for mammalian models of gut inflammation" from Tina Trenczek and Ulrich Flögel. The doctorate was awarded with the highest grade summa cum laude, and Windfelder was awarded the Dr.-Herbert-Stolzenberg-Prize for outstanding achievements in biology in 2023 for his work. After receiving his doctorate, Windfelder moved to the Fraunhofer Institute for Molecular Biology and Applied Ecology to work with Andreas Vilcinskas. He is also employed at the University Hospital Giessen in Experimental Radiology. Windfelder is also involved in university teaching and advocates the use of new didactic methods, such as virtual reality, in medical education.

During his time in Giessen, Windfelder met his wife. Windfelder is married and has two children.

== Scientific work ==
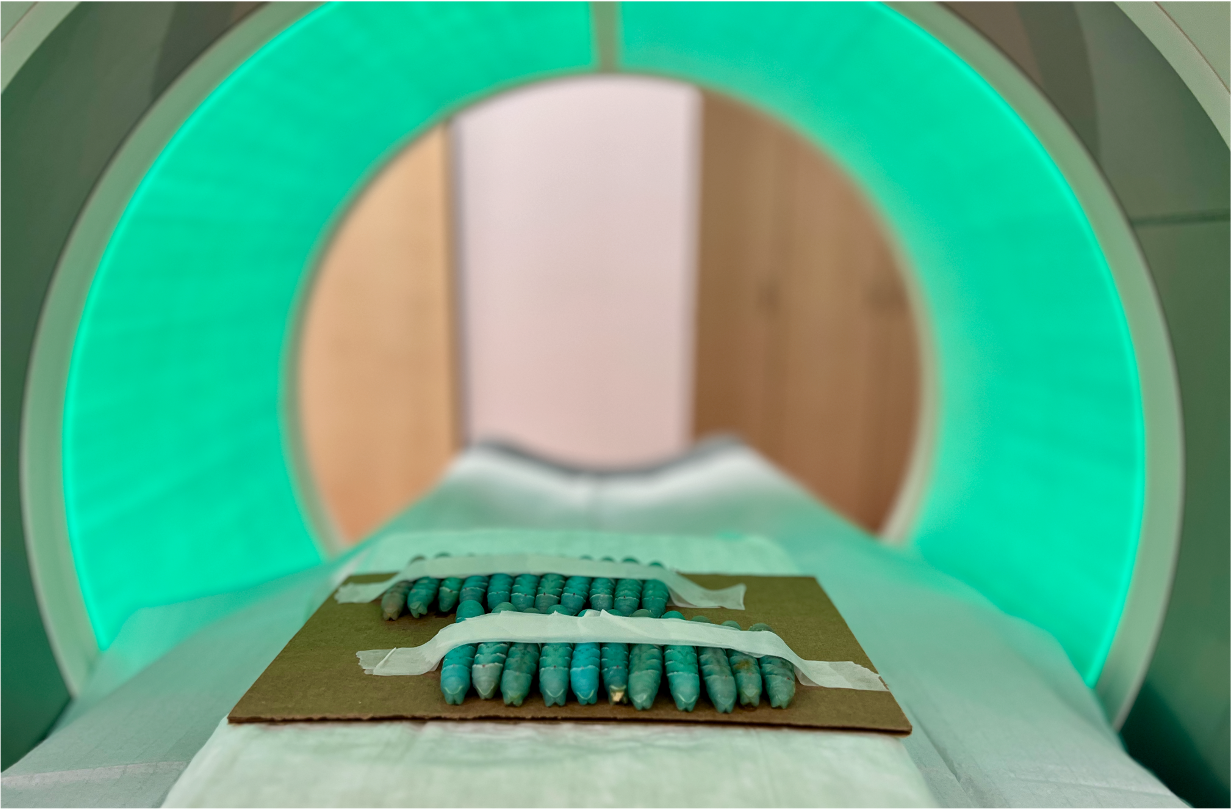
Manduca sexta during Magnetic resonance imaging (MRI)

Windfelder's scientific focus is on the functional imaging of insects. He exploits medical imaging methods such as computed tomography, magnetic resonance imaging, positron emission tomography, or photoacoustic imaging to study physiological and immunological processes in insects. He was the first scientist to use ^{18}F-fluorodeoxyglucose positron emission tomography (FDG-PET) to show pathological glucose metabolism in tobacco hornworms with gut inflammation His work shows that the previously mentioned methods can also be used in insects to detect inflammation in analogy to humans.

This allows insects to be better protected from harmful influences such as pesticides, as the adverse effects of these substances can now be detected more easily. On the other hand, insects can be used as alternative animal models in biomedical research. Due to the close evolutionary conservation of the innate immune system and the anatomy of the intestinal epithelium between insects and mammals, insects represent excellent models for studying gut inflammation. For this purpose, Windfelder and his team established the larvae of the tobacco hornworm (Manduca sexta) using the above methods as an alternative animal model for chronic inflammatory bowel diseases such as Crohn's disease and ulcerative colitis. In addition, new promising contrast agents for radiology or tracers for nuclear medicine can first be tested on insects instead of mice or rats, as was previously the case. Since Windfelder's research helps reduce the number of experiments involving small mammals, his research also significantly contributes to animal welfare (3Rs principle).

== Literature (selection) ==
- Windfelder, Anton G., et al. "High-throughput screening of caterpillars as a platform to study host–microbe interactions and enteric immunity." Nature communications 13.1 (2022): 7216.
- Windfelder, Anton G., et al. "A quantitative micro-tomographic gut atlas of the lepidopteran model insect Manduca sexta." iScience 26.6 (2023).
- Windfelder, Anton G., et al. "An enteric ultrastructural surface atlas of the model insect Manduca sexta." iScience 27.4 (2024).
- Koshkina, Olga, et al. "Biodegradable polyphosphoester micelles act as both background-free 31P magnetic resonance imaging agents and drug nanocarriers." Nature Communications 14.1 (2023): 4351.
- Laussmann, Tim, et al. "Dynamic monitoring of vital functions and tissue re-organization in Saturnia pavonia (Lepidoptera, Saturniidae) during final metamorphosis by non-invasive MRI." Scientific Reports 12.1 (2022): 1105
- Müller, F. H. H., et al. "Positron emission mammography in the diagnosis of breast cancer." Nuklearmedizin-NuclearMedicine 55.01 (2016): 15–20.
