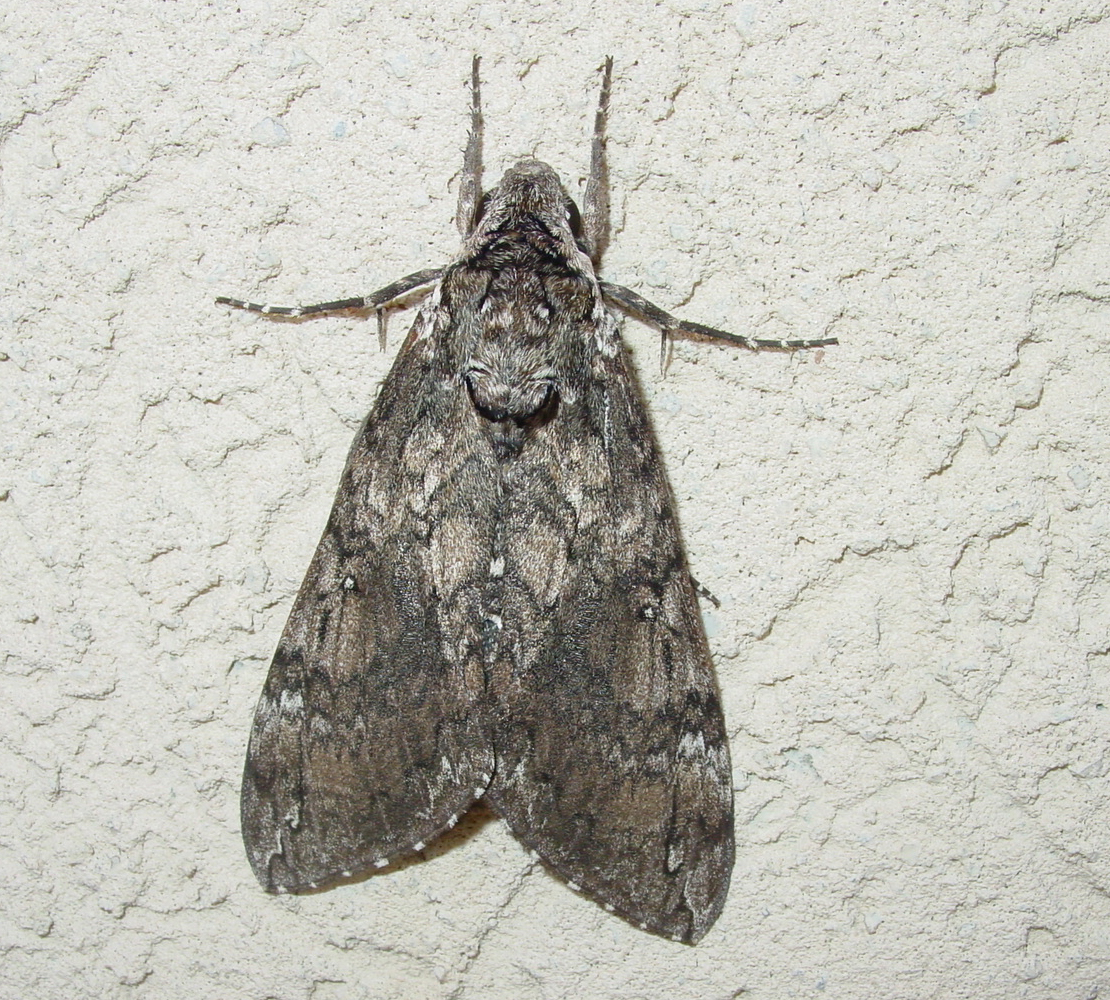
- Adult moth (Imago)

Scientific classification
- Kingdom: Animalia
- Phylum: Arthropoda
- Clade: Pancrustacea
- Class: Insecta
- Order: Lepidoptera
- Family: Sphingidae
- Genus: Manduca
- Species: M. sexta

Binomial name
- Manduca sexta (Linnaeus, 1763)

Synonyms
- Sphinx sexta Linnaeus, 1763; Protoparce sexta; Phlegethontius sex; Sphinx carolina Linnaeus, 1764; Manduca carolina; Phlegethontius carolina; Protoparce carolina; Macrosila carolina; Protoparce jamaicensis Butler, 1876; Sphinx lycopersici Boisduval, [1875]; Sphinx nicotianae Boisduval, [1875]; Sphinx paphus Cramer, 1779; Protoparce griseata Butler, 1875; Protoparce leucoptera Rothschild and Jordan, 1903; Protoparce sexta luciae Gehlen, 1928; Protoparce sexta peruviana Bryk, 1953; Sphinx caestri Blanchard, 1854; Sphinx eurylochus Philippi, 1860; Sphinx tabaci Boisduval, [1875]; Protoparce sexta saliensis Kernbach, 1964

= Manduca sexta =

- Caterpillar (Larva)

Species of moth

Manduca sexta is a moth of the family Sphingidae present through much of the Americas. The species was first described by Carl Linnaeus in his 1763 Centuria Insectorum.

Commonly known as the Carolina sphinx moth and the tobacco hawk moth (as adults) and the tobacco hornworm and the Goliath worm (as larvae), it is closely related to and often confused with the very similar tomato hornworm (Manduca quinquemaculata); the larvae of both feed on the foliage of various plants of the family Solanaceae. The larvae of these species can be distinguished by their lateral markings: tomato hornworms have eight V-shaped white markings with no borders, while tobacco hornworms have seven white diagonal lines with a black border. Additionally, tobacco hornworms have red horns, while tomato hornworms have dark blue or black horns. A mnemonic to remember the markings is tobacco hornworms have straight white lines like cigarettes, while tomato hornworms have V-shaped markings (as in "vine-ripened" tomatoes). M. sexta has mechanisms for selectively sequestering and secreting the neurotoxin nicotine present in tobacco.

M. sexta is a common model organism, especially in neurobiology, due to its easily accessible nervous system and short life cycle. Because of its immense size M. sexta is big enough for medical imaging modalities (like CT, MRI, or PET) and used as a model in imaging and gut inflammation. It is used in a variety of biomedical and biological scientific experiments. It can be easily raised on a wheat-germ-based diet. The larva is large, and thus it is relatively easy to dissect it and isolate its organs.

== Life cycle ==
M. sexta has a short life cycle, lasting about 30 to 50 days. In most areas, M. sexta has about two generations per year, but can have three or four generations per year in Florida.

=== Eggs ===
M. sexta eggs are spherical, approximately 1.5 millimeters in diameter, and translucent green. They typically hatch two to four days after they are laid. Eggs are normally found on the underside of foliage, but can also be found on the upper surface.

=== Larva ===
M. sexta larvae are bright green in color and grow up to 100 millimeters in length. The posterior abdominal segment is tipped with a dorsocaudal horn that earns them the name "hornworm". The final instar consists of a cylindrical body covered with fine hairlike setae. The head is equipped with a pair of ocelli and chewing mouthparts. Each of the three thoracic segments bears a pair of true legs, and there is a pair of prolegs on the third, fourth, fifth, sixth, and last abdominal segments in all larval instars. The prothoracic segment bears one pair of spiracles, and additional pairs occur on each of the eight abdominal segments.

The hemolymph (blood) of this species contains insecticyanin, a blue-colored biliprotein. When the larva feeds on its normal diet of plant foliage, it ingests pigmentacious carotenoids, which are primarily yellow in hue. The resulting combination is green. Under laboratory conditions—when fed a wheat-germ-based diet—larvae are turquoise in color due to the lack of carotenoids in their diet.

The caterpillar stage of the tobacco hornworm is quite similar in appearance to that of the closely related tomato hornworm. The larvae of these two species can however be readily distinguished by their lateral markings. Specifically, the M. sexta caterpillar has seven white diagonal lines with a black border at the first seven abdominal segments, and the horn is red or green with a red tip. The M. quinquemaculatacaterpillar has V-shaped white markings with no borders at all eight of its abdominal segments, and the horn is dark blue or black in color.

During the larval stage, M. sexta caterpillars feed on plants of the family Solanaceae, principally tobacco, tomatoes and members of the genus Datura. M. sexta has five larval instars, which are separated by ecdysis (molting), but may add larval instars when nutrient conditions are poor. Near the end of this stage, the caterpillar seeks a location for pupation, burrows underground, and pupates. This searching behavior is known as "wandering". The imminence of pupation—suggested behaviorally by the wandering—can be anatomically confirmed by spotting the heart (aorta), which is a long, pulsating vessel running along the length of the caterpillar's dorsal side. The heart becomes visible through the skin just as the caterpillar is reaching the end of the final instar.

A common biological control for hornworms is the parasitic braconid wasp Cotesia congregata, which lays its eggs in the bodies of the hornworms. The wasp larvae feed internally and emerge from the body to spin their cocoons. Parasitized hornworms are often seen covered with multiple white, cottony wasp cocoons, which are often mistaken for large eggs. A wasp species, Polistes erythrocephalus, feeds on hornworm larvae.

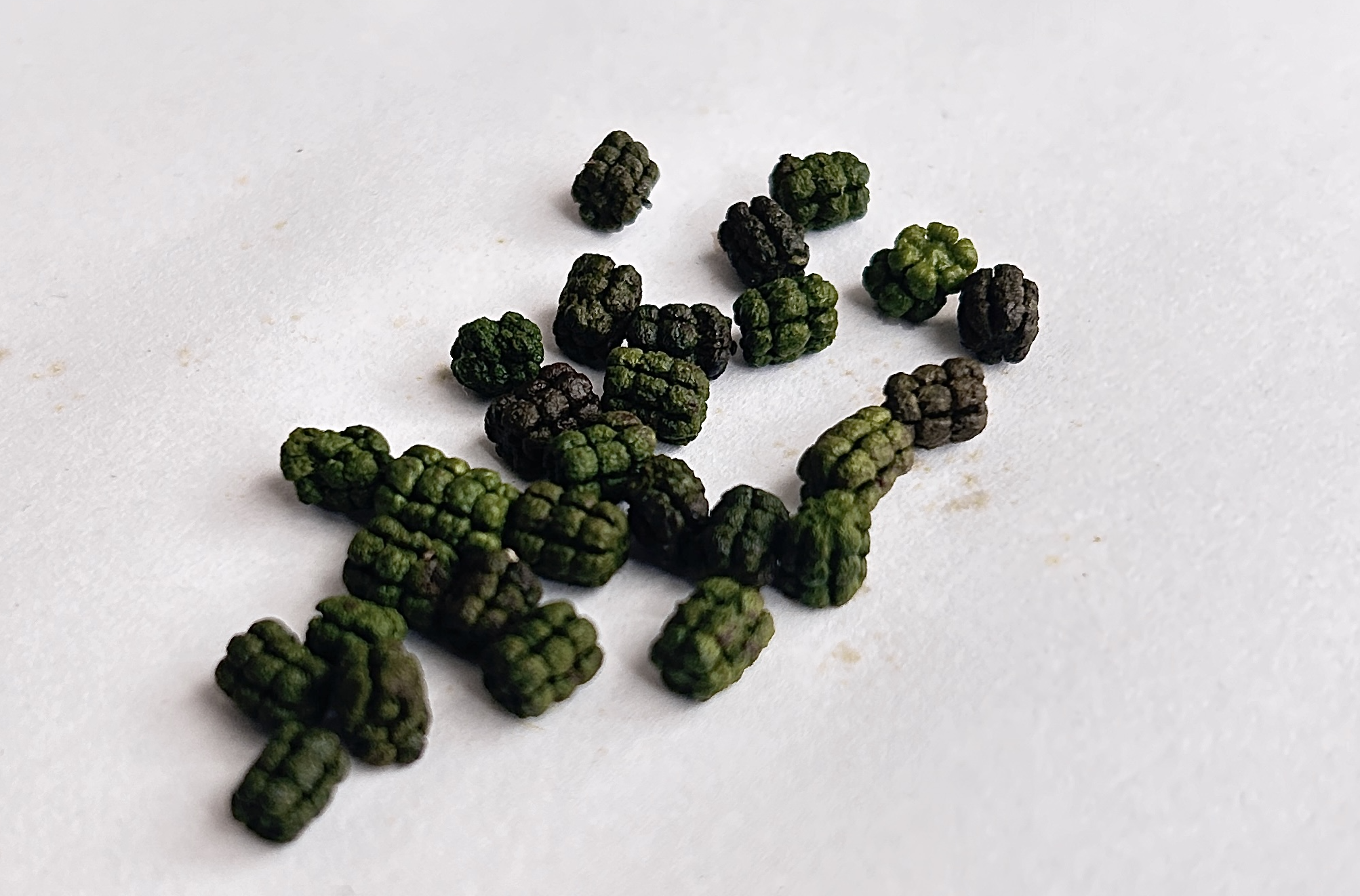
Droppings from a Manduca sexta larva

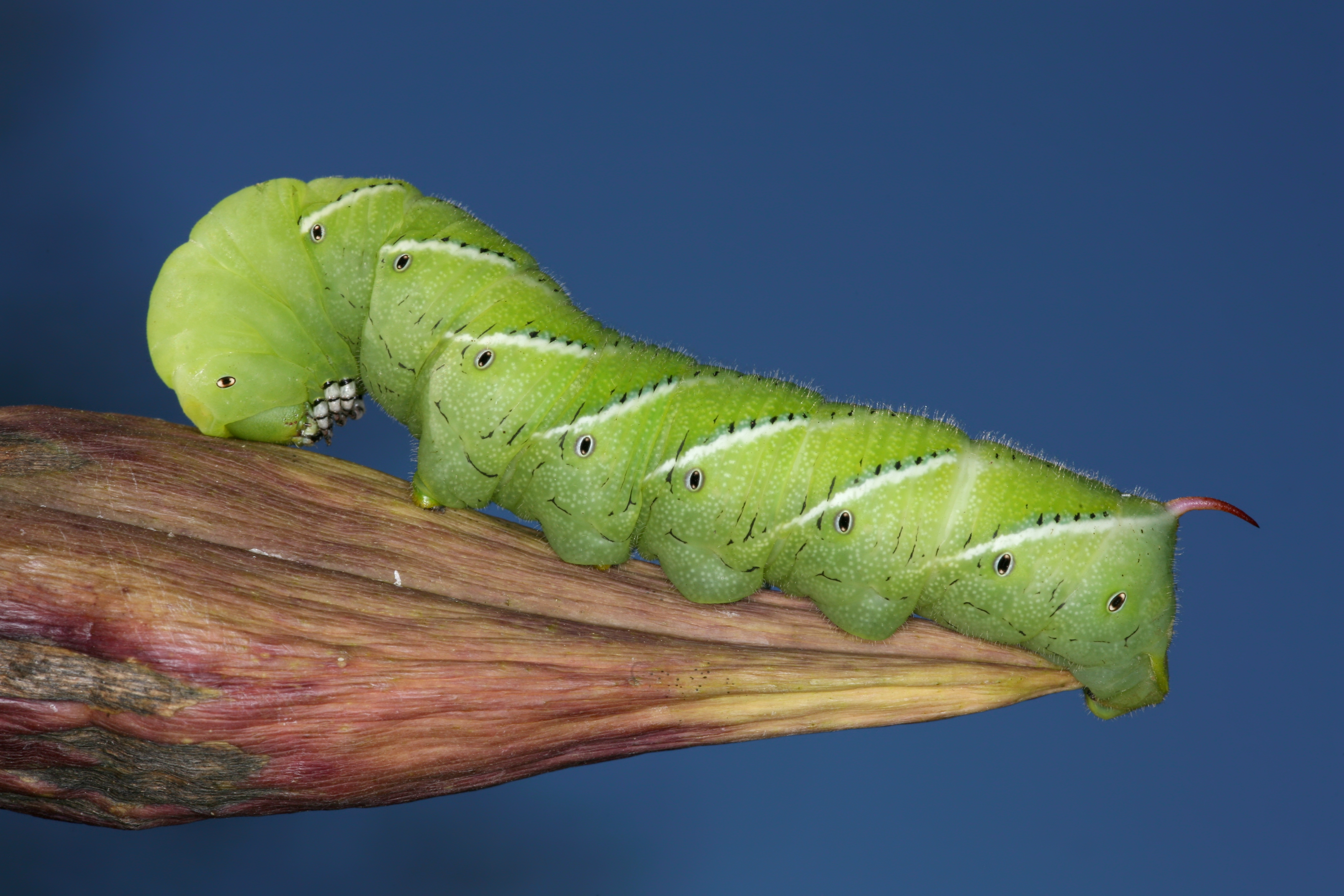

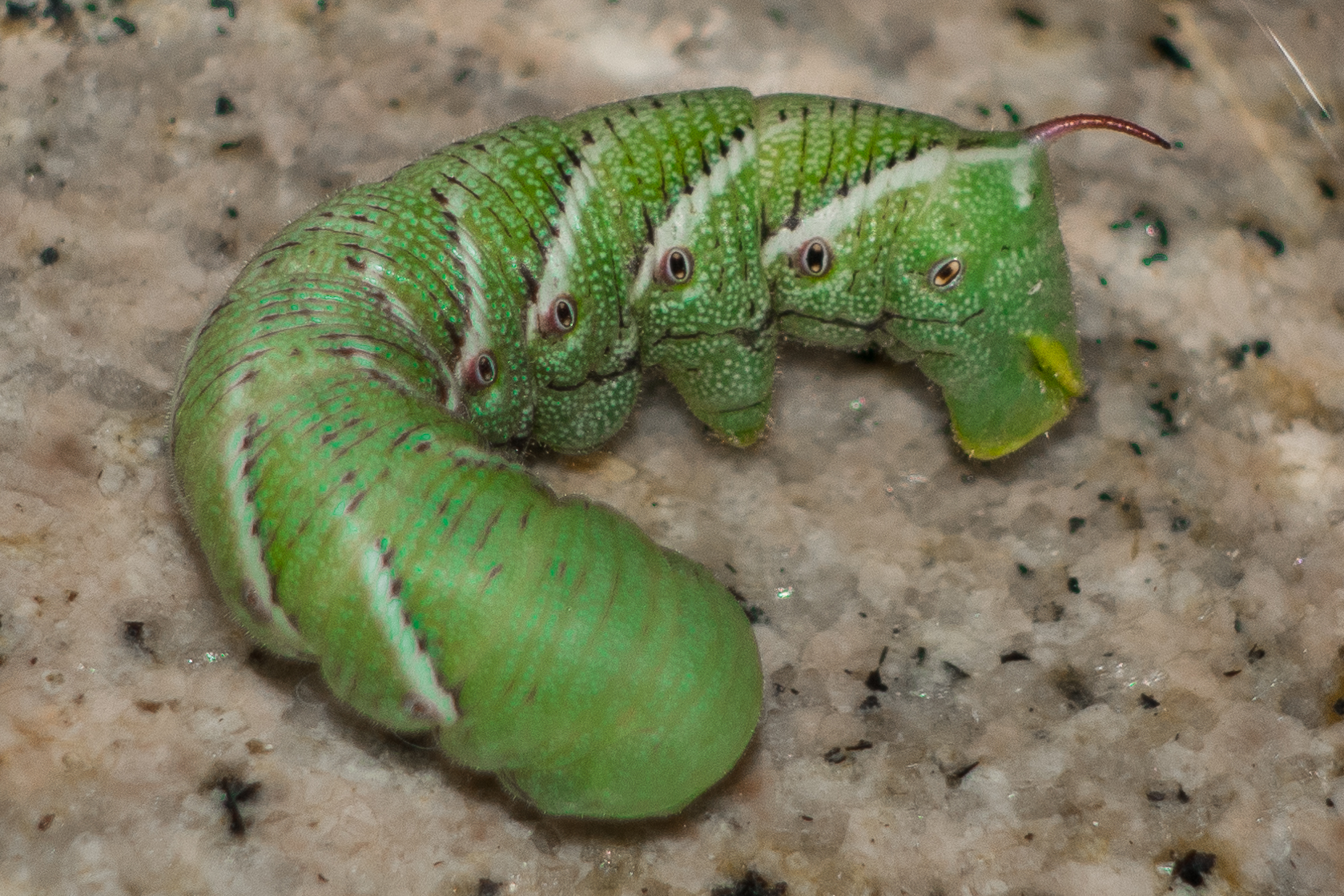
In the larval state its back end might be confused as its head.

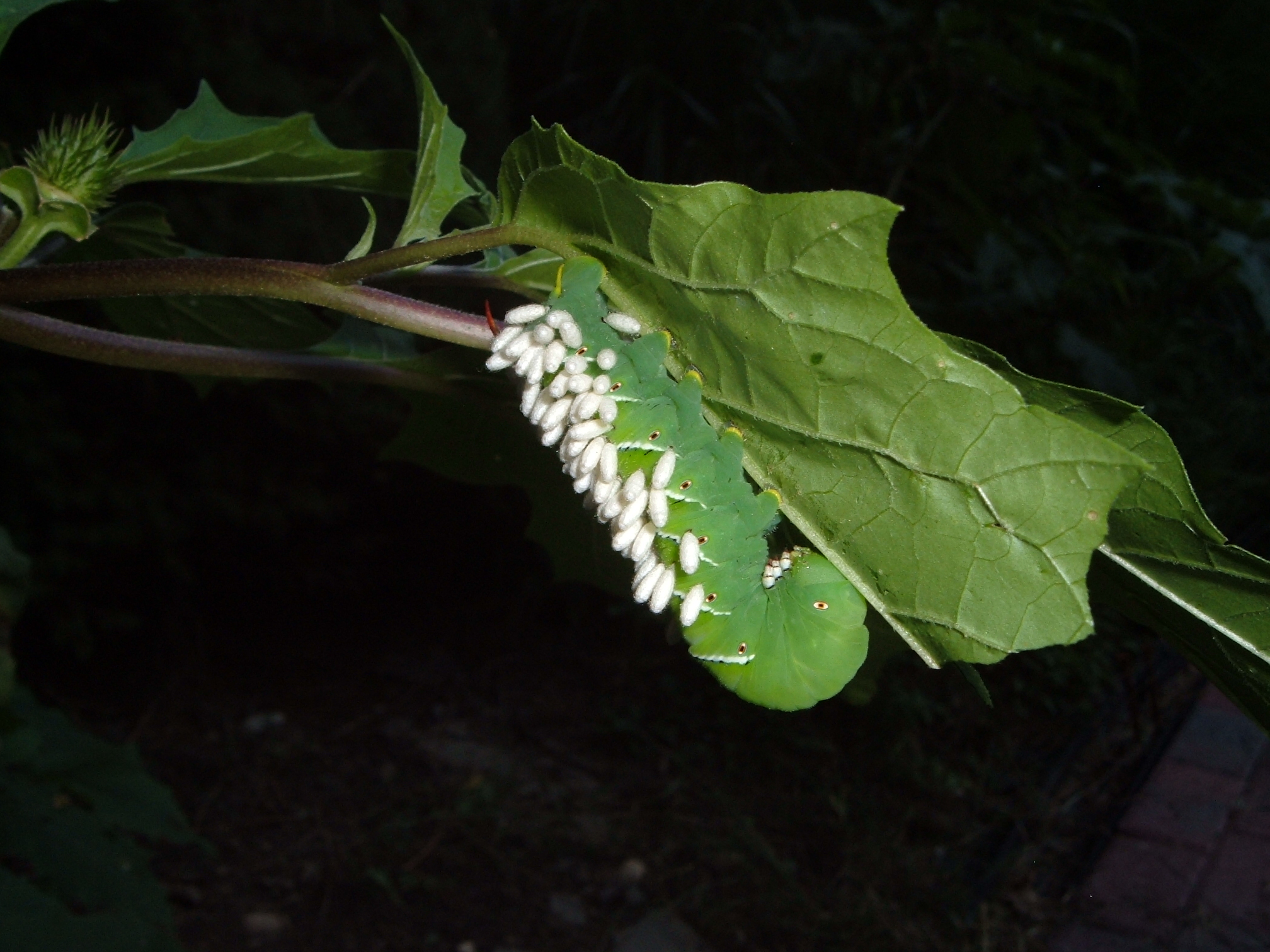
With parasitic wasp cocoons

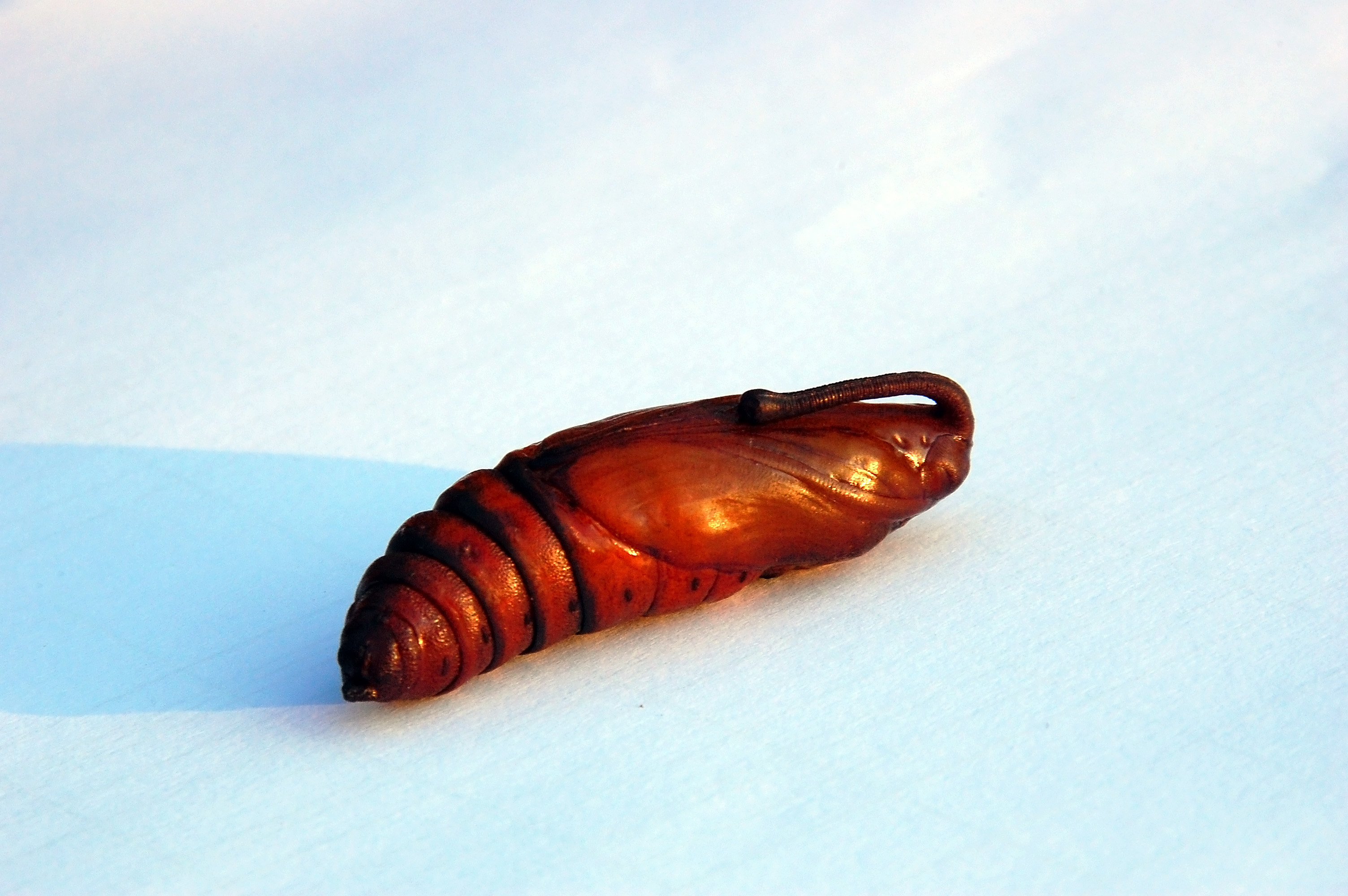
Pupa

=== Pre-pupa ===
Before the larva pupates, it goes through a stage called the pre-pupa, where it shrinks considerably and prepares to pupate. Often people mistake this stage for a dead or dying caterpillar.

=== Pupa ===
The pupal stage lasts approximately 14–18 days under laboratory conditions (17 hours light, 7 hours dark, 27 °C). When reared on a short-day photoperiod (12 hours light, 12 hours dark), pupae enter a state of diapause that can last several months. During the pupal stage, structures of the adult moth form within the pupal case, which is shed during eclosion (adult emergence).

=== Adult ===
Adult M. sexta have narrow wings with a wing span of approximately 9.5-12 cm. M. sexta moths are nectarivorous and feed on flowers, demonstrating a remarkable ability to hover.

Adults are sexually dimorphic. Males are identifiable by their broader antennae and the presence of claspers at the end of the abdomen. Female moths are typically ready to mate one week after eclosion, and do so only once. Males may mate many times. Mating generally occurs on a vertical surface at night, and can last several hours, with the male and female facing in opposite positions, their posterior ends touching. After mating, females deposit their fertilized eggs on foliage, usually on the underside of leaves.

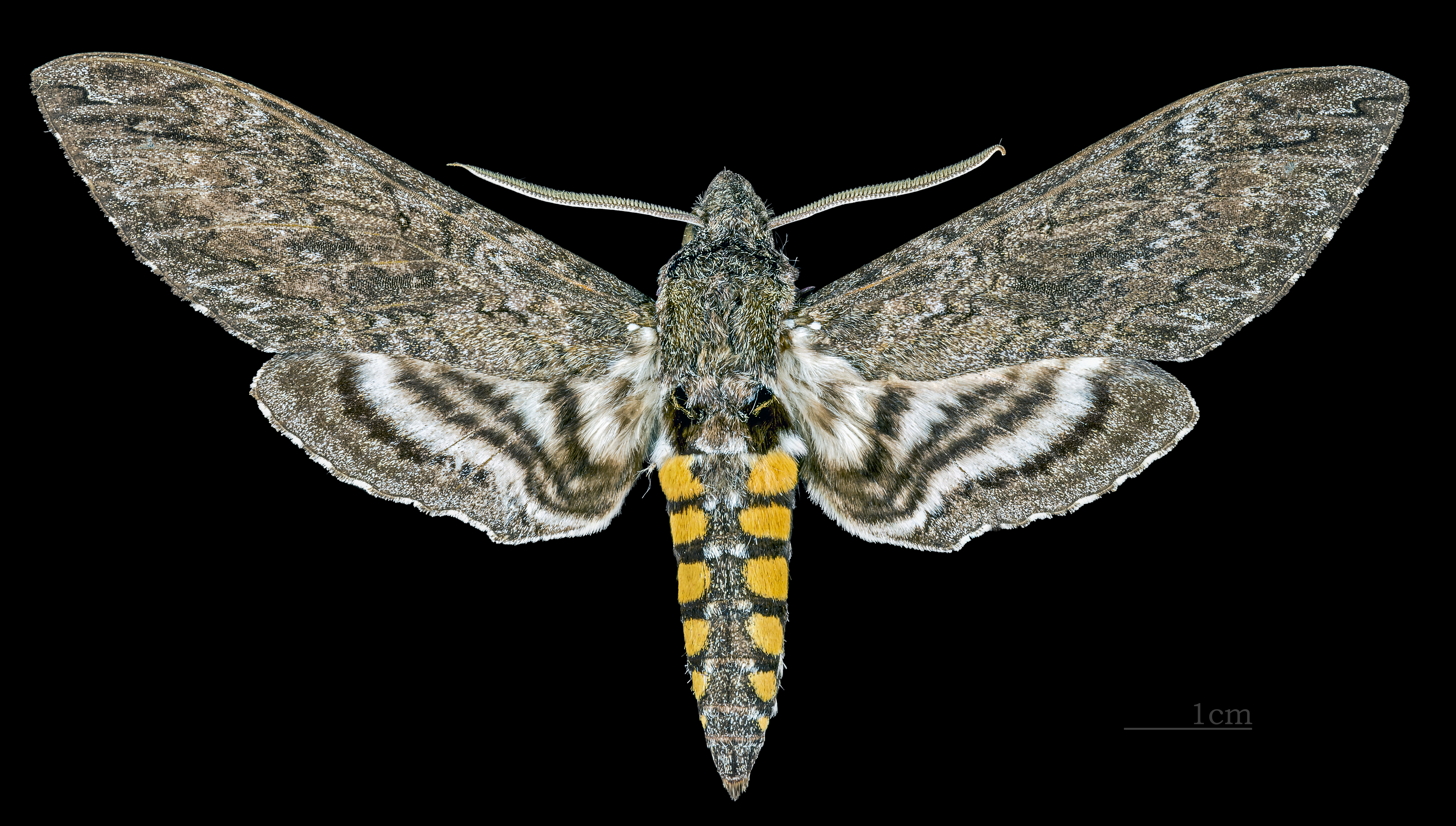
Male

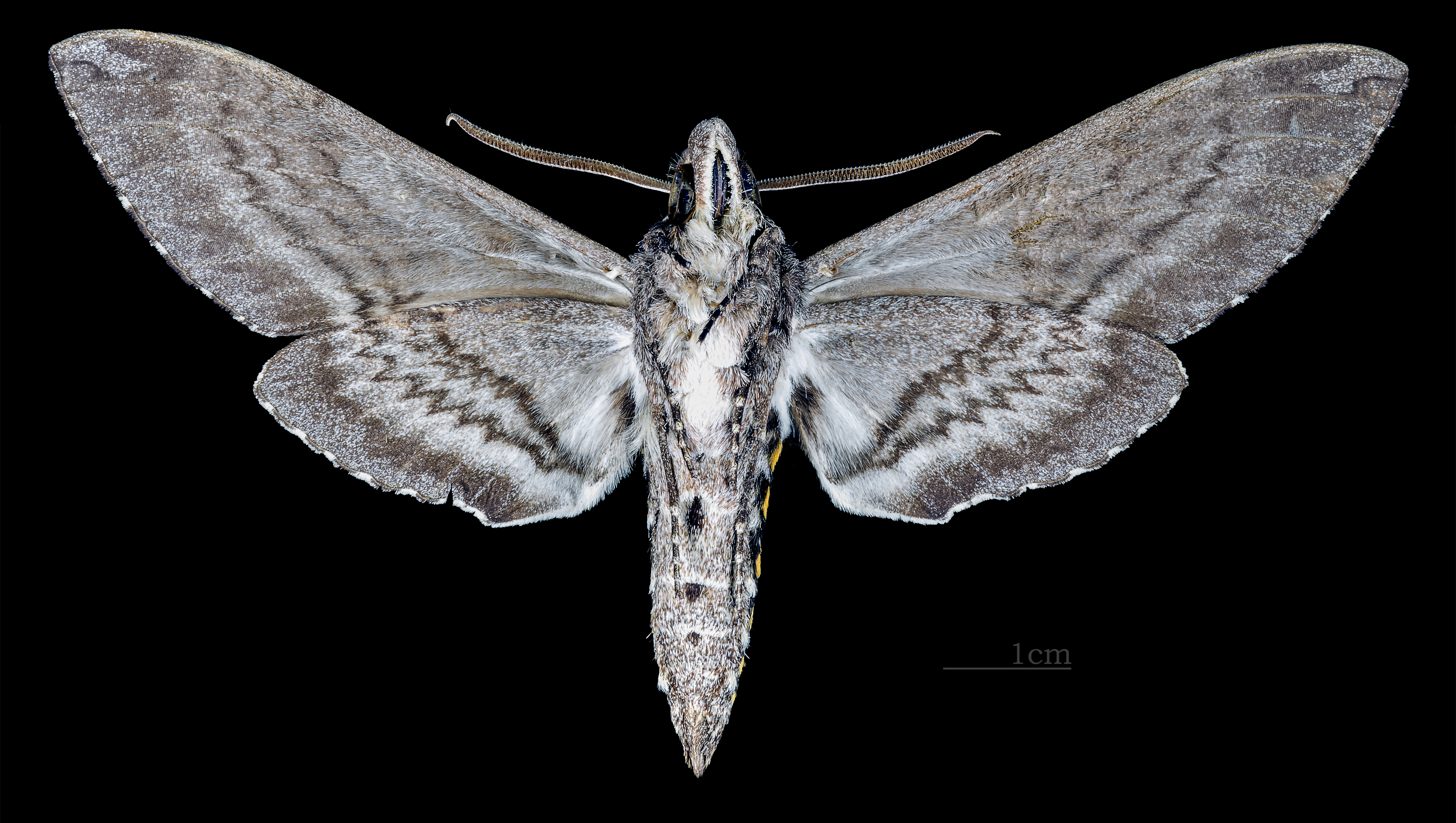
Male underside

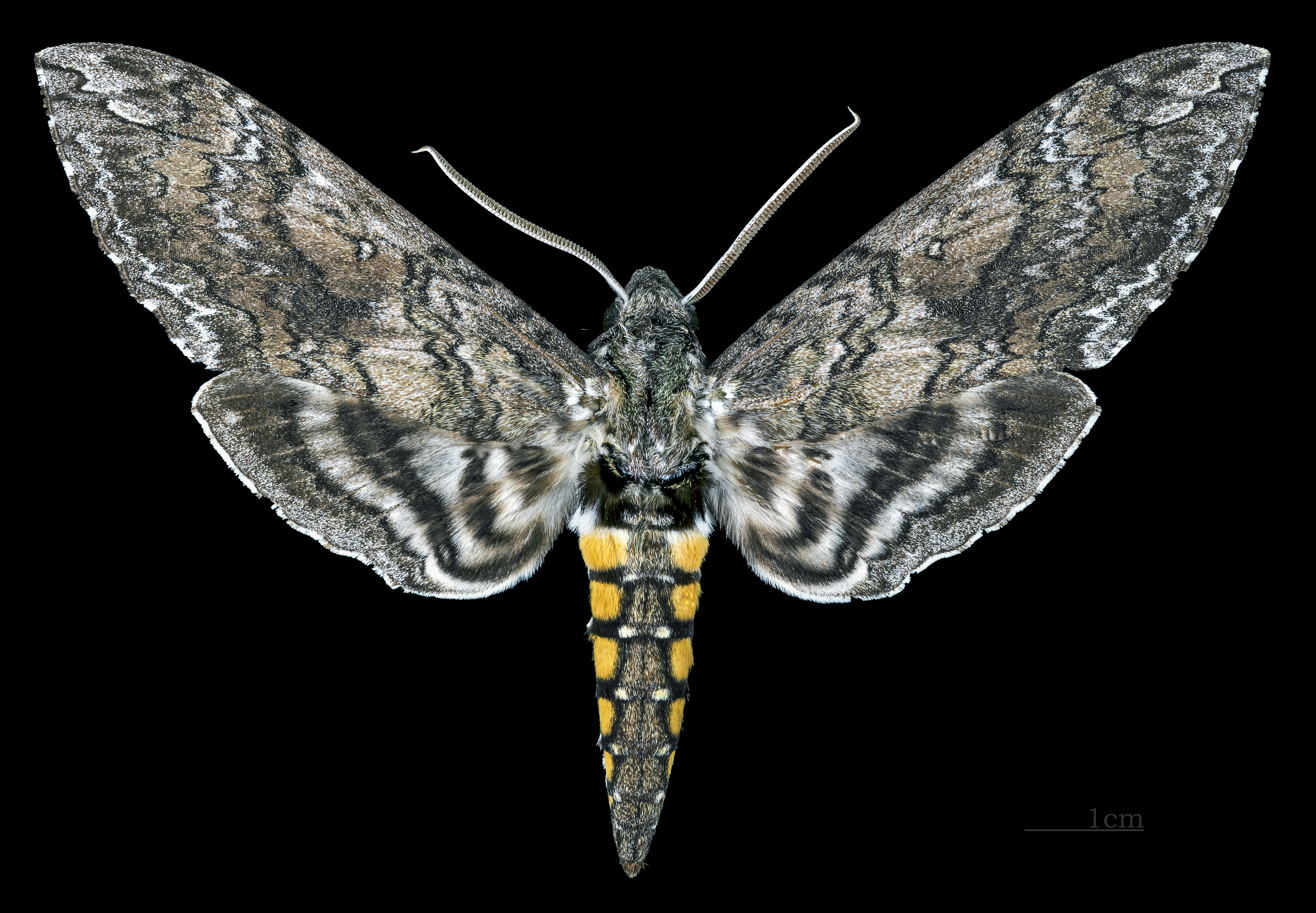
Female

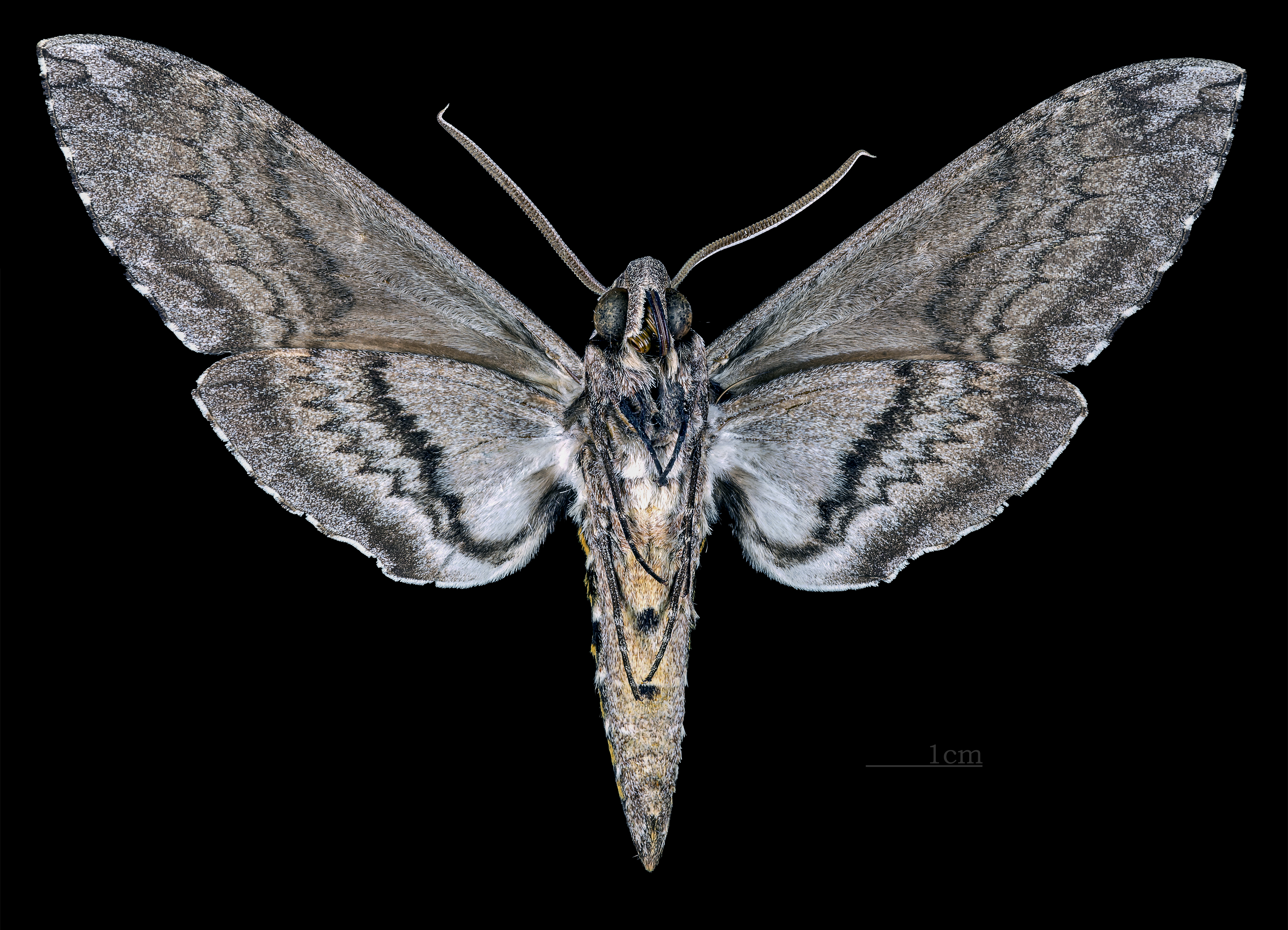
Female underside

=== Laboratory rearing ===
Like Drosophila melanogaster, M. sexta is commonly used as a model organism for experiments. They are frequently studied in the laboratory due to their large size and relative ease of rearing. They may be reared on host plants, such as tobacco and tobacco relatives, tomato plants, or wheat-germ-based artificial diet. Their rearing is straightforward, provided they receive a long daylight cycle (e.g., 14 hours) during development to prevent diapause.

Eggs are rinsed for one to five minutes in dilute household bleach for disinfection.

Eggs are placed on diet cubes or host plants. The eggs hatch and develop at different speeds depending on temperature. The larvae are moved to a fresh diet or leaves as their food spoils or is consumed. When they start to "wander", they are about to pupate, so are placed in a pupation chamber. Pupation chambers are holes drilled into a wood board. The Manduca larvae are sealed in the chamber using a stopper and allowed to pupate. After pupation, the pupae are placed in a breeding or colony chamber to eclose. Providing a cup of sugar water and a tobacco (or related) plant will allow mated females to oviposit fertile eggs, which can then be reared.

When fed an artificial diet, Manduca larvae do not consume the xanthophyll -which is a yellow pigment- needed to produce their green coloration; instead they appear blue. On some diets, they have very little pigment and pigment precursors, so are a very pale blue-white. As vitamin A and other carotenoids are necessary for the visual pigments (rhodopsin), an artificial-diet-reared hornworm may have poor vision due to lack of carotenoids in the diet.

=== As pet food ===
Captive-bred hornworms fed on an artificial diet are often given to insectivorous exotic animals, such as certain reptiles, fish and small mammals. They are preferred over wild-collected hornworms, which may bioaccumulate poisonous substances found in dietary plants. Hornworms, though originally bred for laboratories, are also farmed for this purpose. They are often sold already packed into pods that include everything the larvae need, including food. Care is relatively easy, and animals seem to relish their bright color and flavor.

== Animal model ==
M. sexta larvae grow up to 100 millimeters in length, reaching up to 20 grams. Due to their large size, they are used as alternative animal models for medical imaging modalities like computed tomography, magnetic resonance imaging, or positron emission tomography. Researchers around Anton Windfelder have established the larvae of M. sexta as an alternative animal model for chronic inflammatory bowel diseases or as an animal model for testing new contrast agents for radiology.

== Subspecies ==
- Manduca sexta sexta (North and Central America)
- M. s. caestri (Blanchard, 1854) (Chile)
- M. s. jamaicensis (Butler, 1875) (Caribbean)
- M. s. leucoptera (Rothschild & Jordan, 1903) (Galápagos Islands)
- M. s. paphus (Cramer, 1779) (South America)
- M. s. saliensis (Kernbach, 1964) (Argentina)
- M. s. garapa (Pixley, 2016) (Saipan)
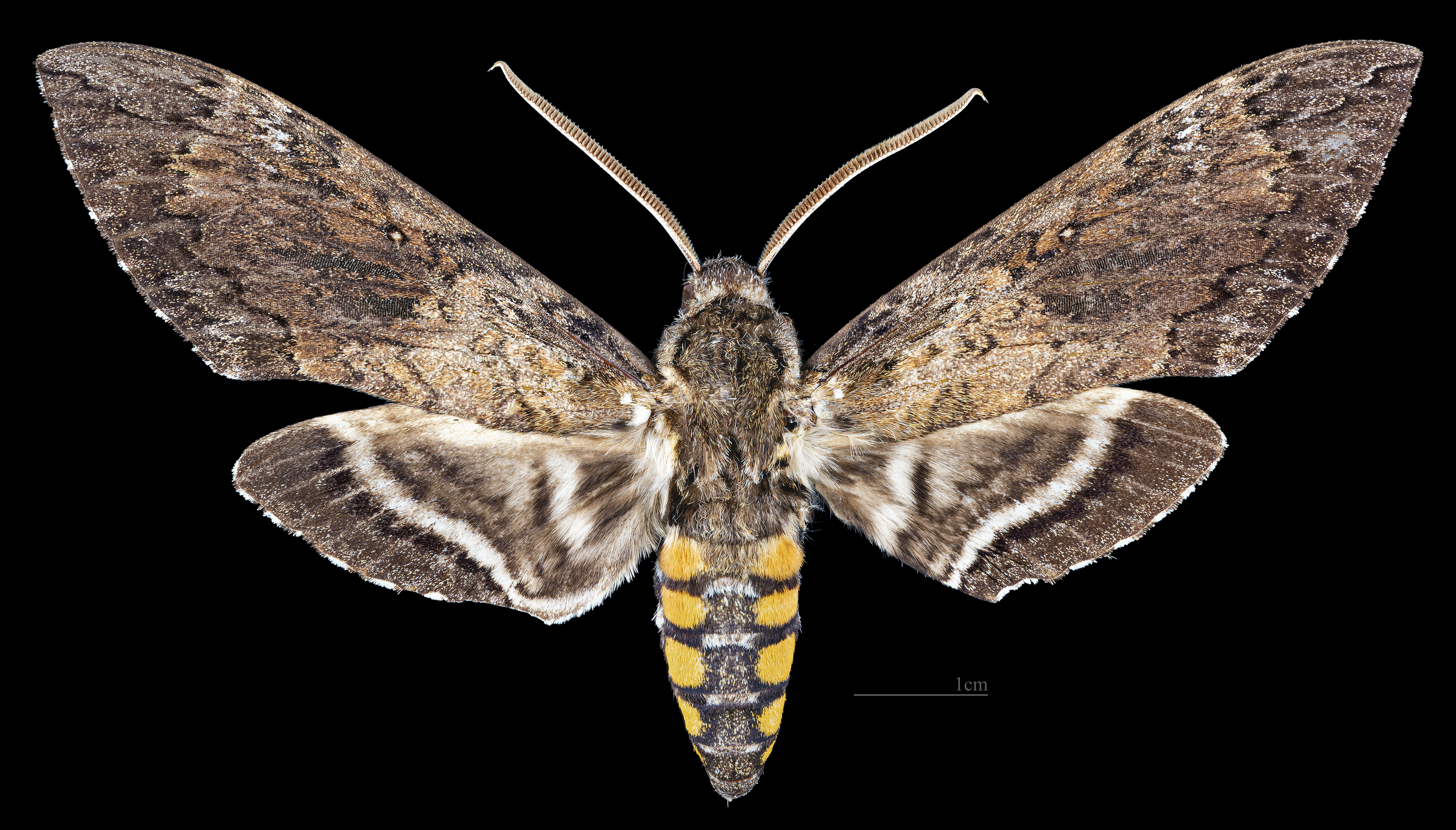
Manduca sexta jamaicensis
Male dorsal

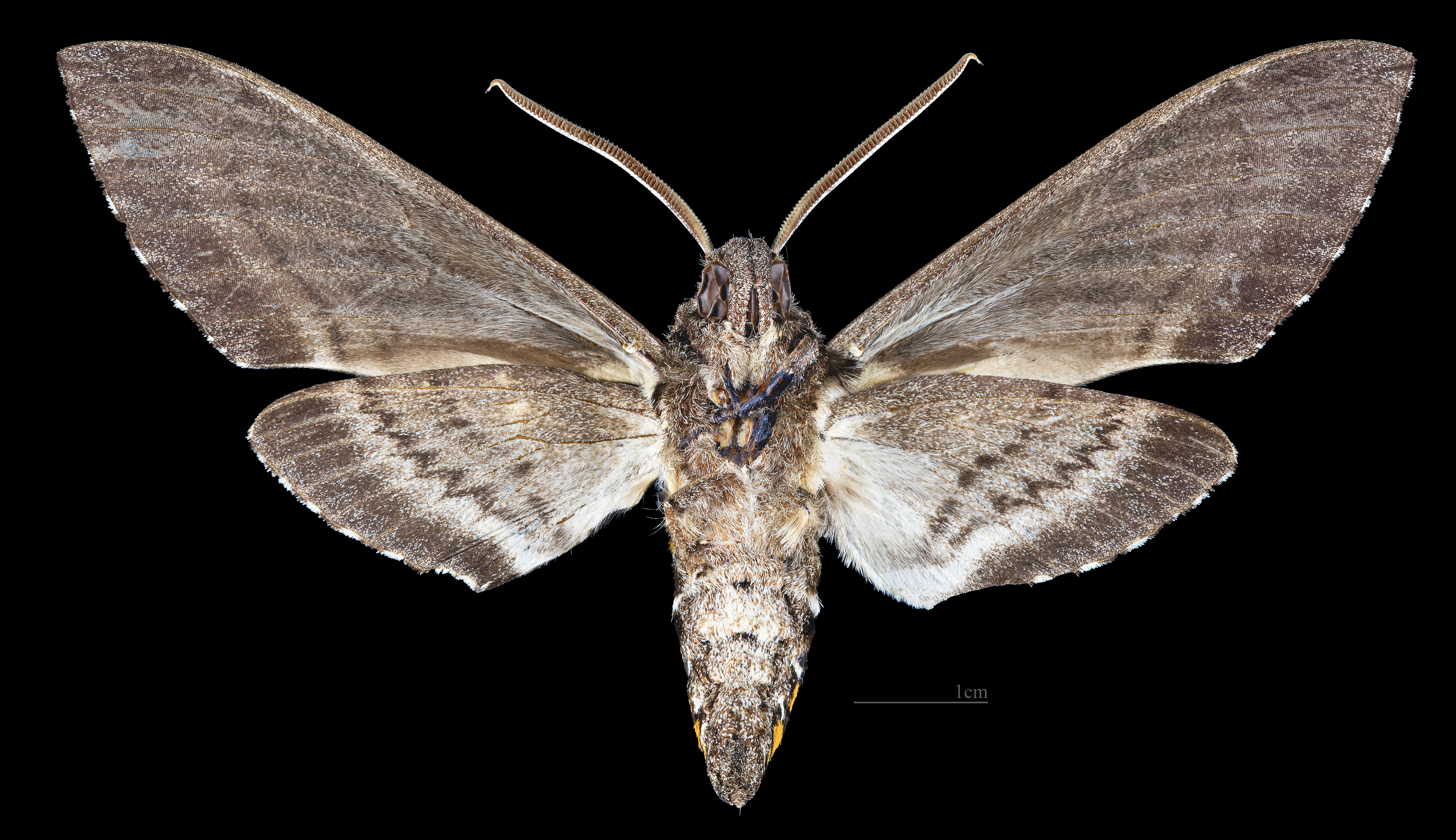
Manduca sexta jamaicensis
Male ventral

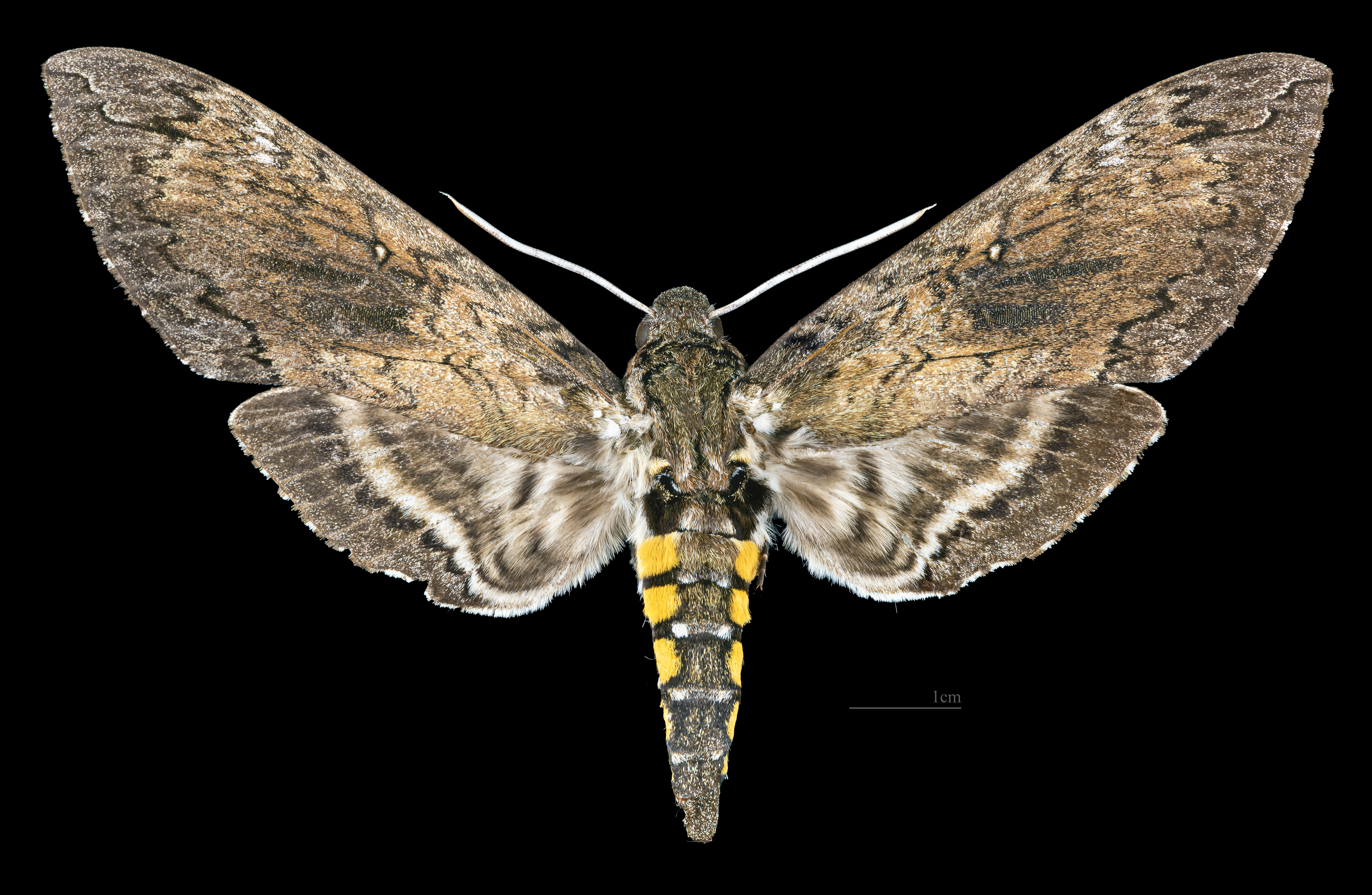
Manduca sexta jamaicensis
Female dorsal

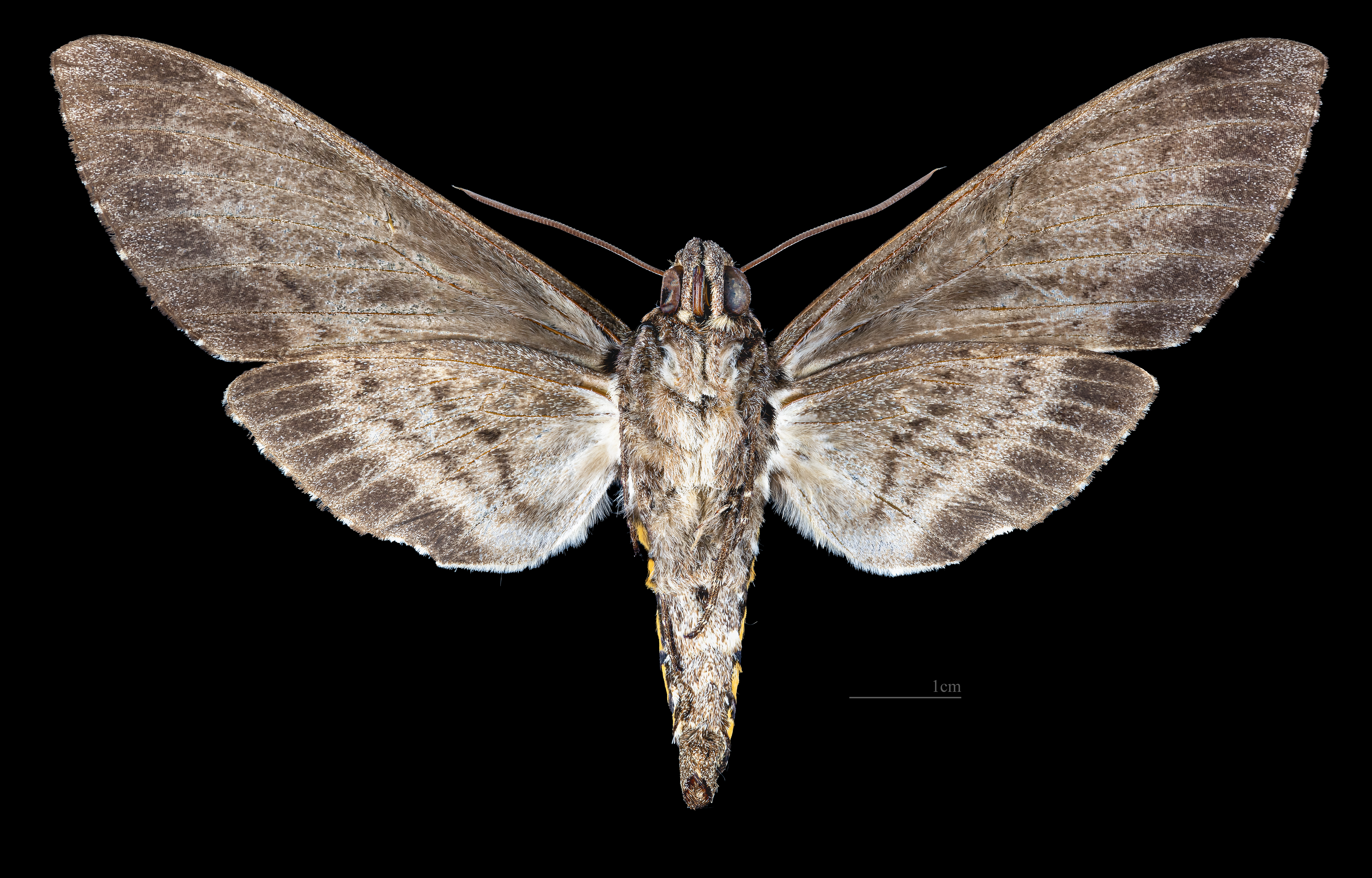
Manduca sexta jamaicensis
Female ventral
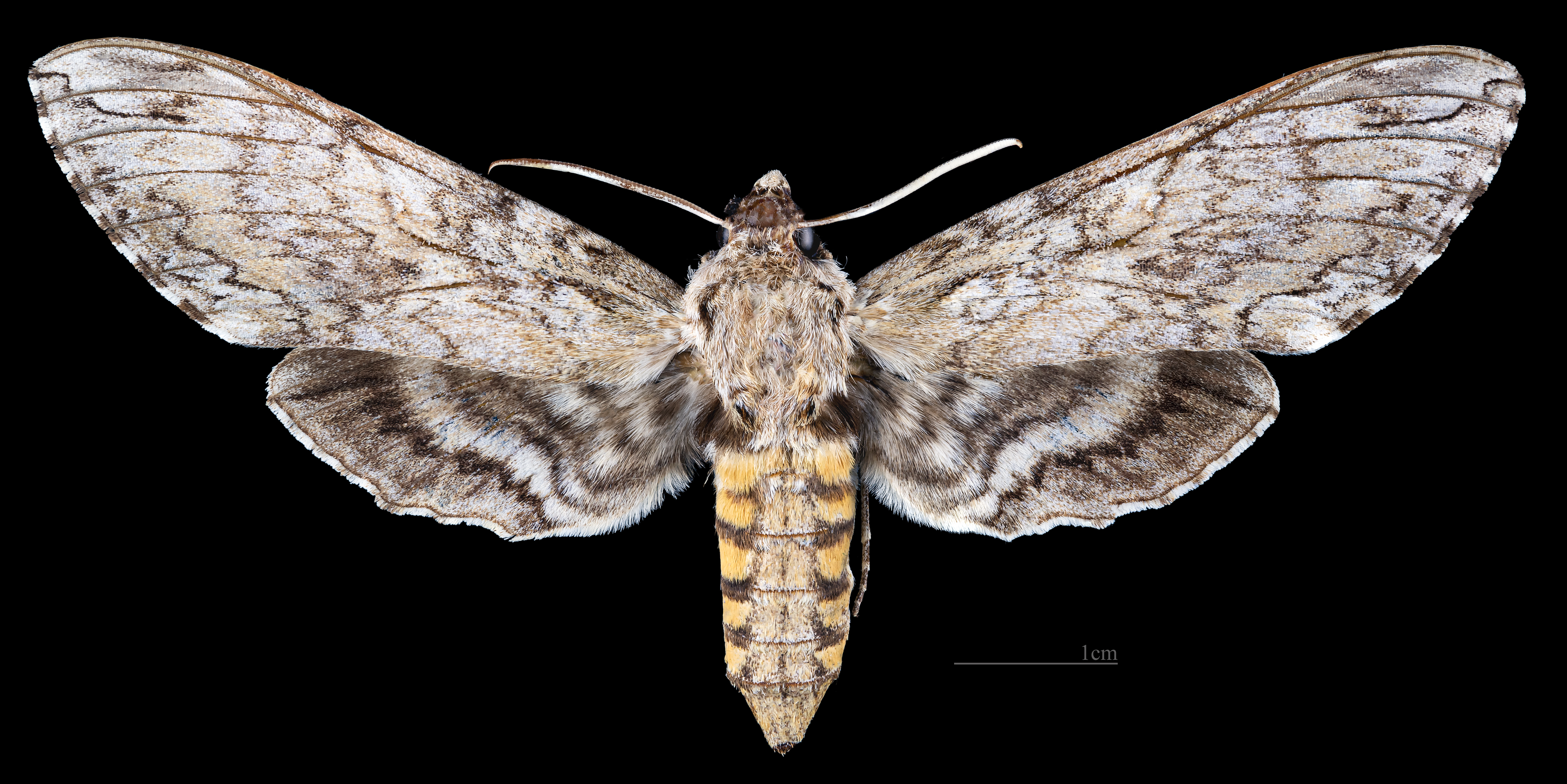
Manduca sexta leucoptera
Female dorsal

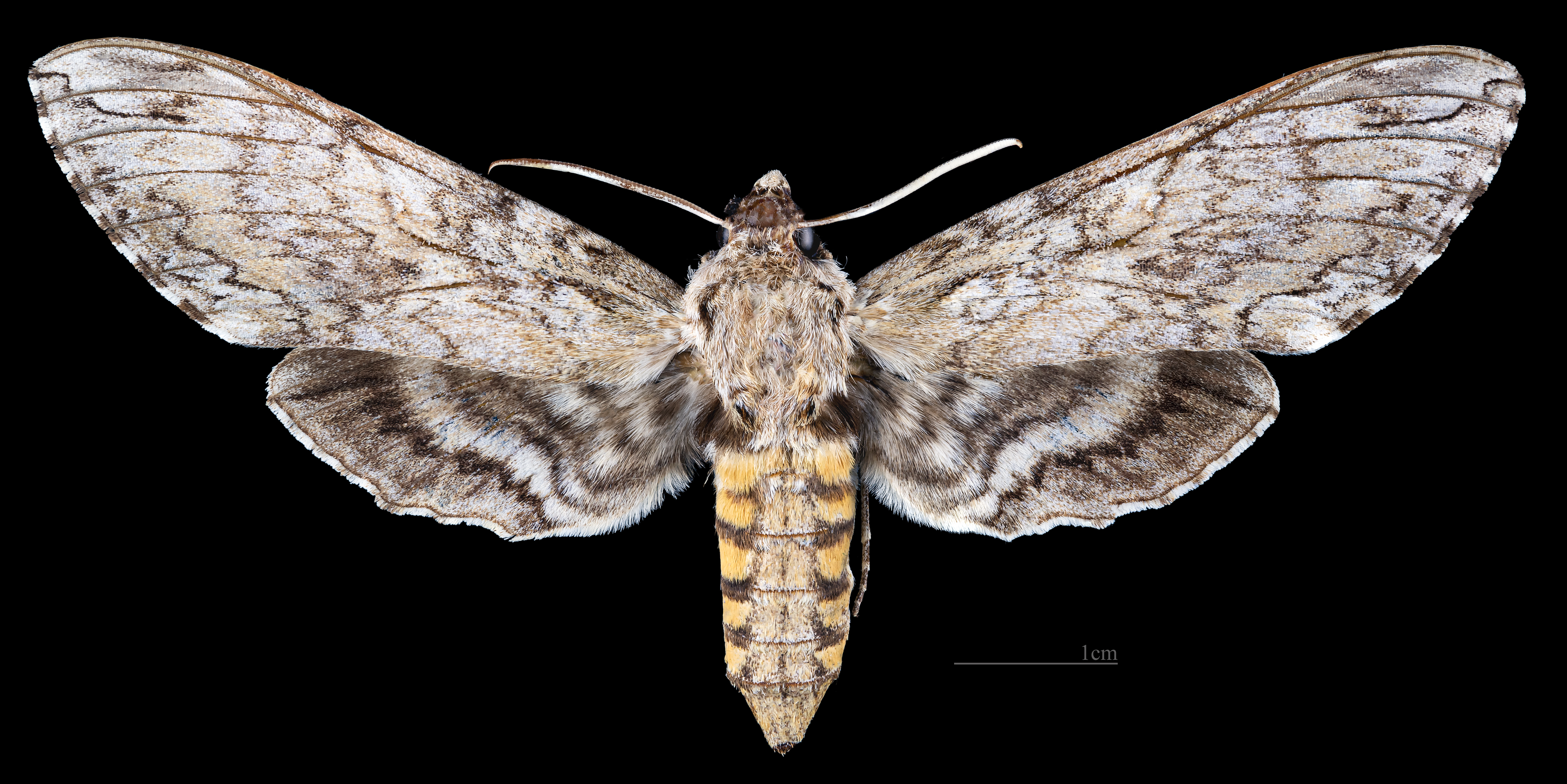
Manduca sexta leucoptera
Female ventral
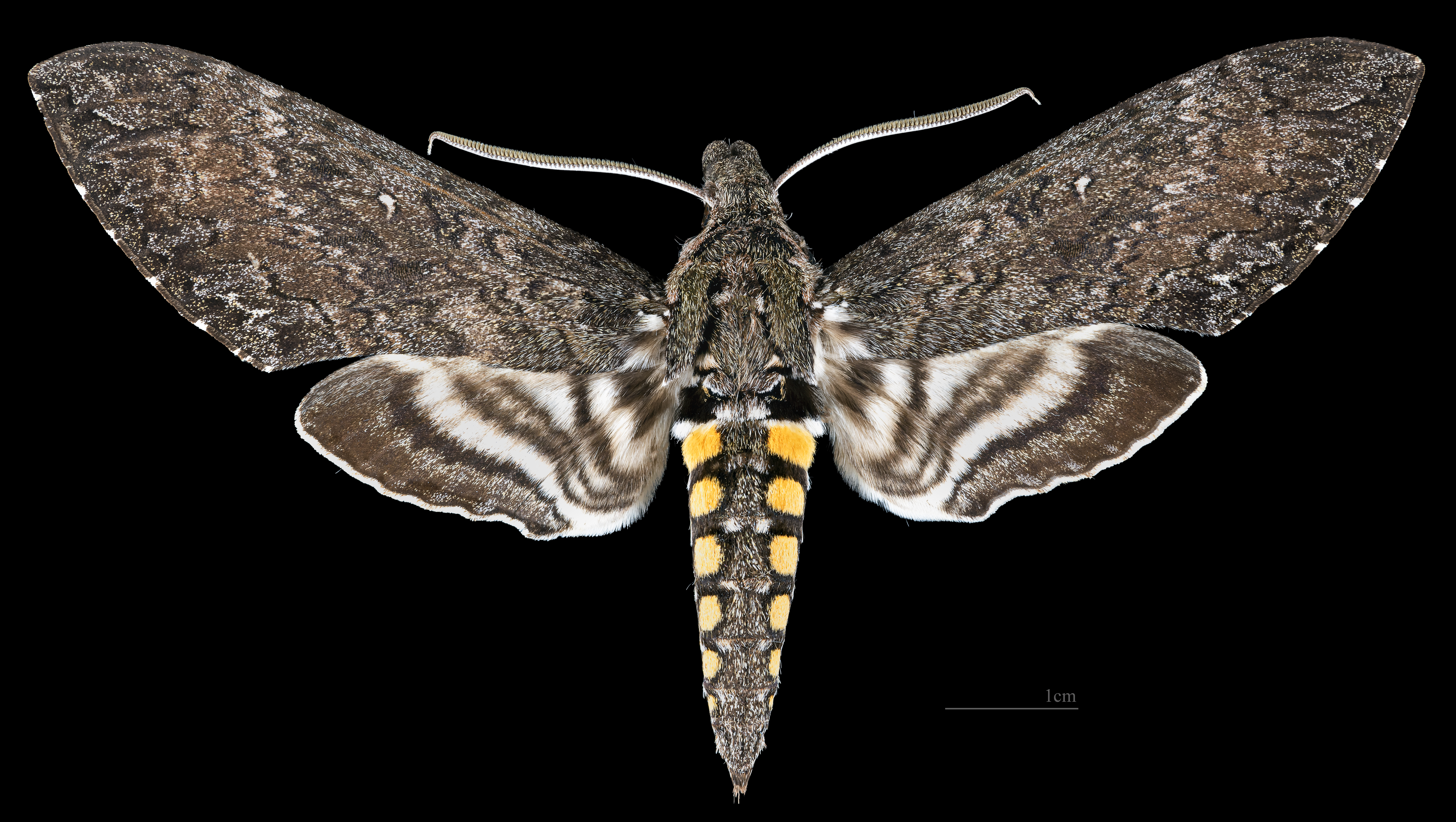
Manduca sexta paphus
Male dorsal

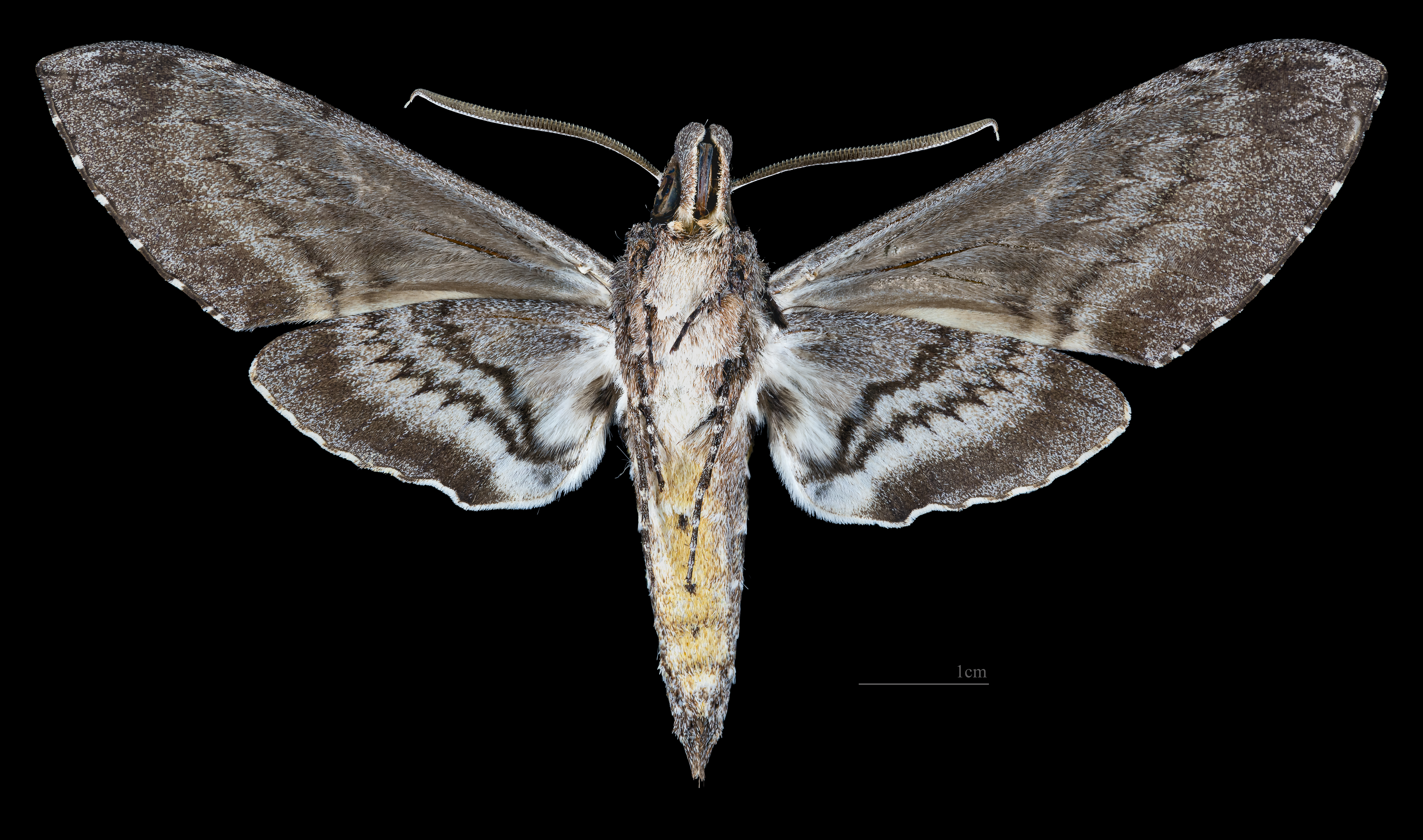
Manduca sexta paphus
Male ventral

== Behavior ==
=== Feeding ===
Tobacco hornworms are facultative specialists; the larvae can grow and develop on any host plants. However, the larvae prefer solanaceous plants, such as tobacco and tomato plants. On these types of plants, larvae grow and develop faster. The lateral and medial sensilla styloconia (sensory receptors) on their mouthparts help them to identify solanaceous plants by recognizing indioside D, a steroidal glycoside found in those particular plants (del Campo et al., 2001). Salicin is a distasteful phagodeterrent, found only in Salix spp. while caffeine is a phagodeterrent that is actually toxic. Schoonhoven 1969 found that M. sexta habituation to salicin is mediated by desensitization of the deterrence associated peripheral neurons and Glendinning et al. 1999 the same for caffeine. However Glendinning et al. 2001 find only a small peripheral desensitization for salicin, concluding that Schoonhoven erred, and that habituation in this case is centrally mediated. Tobacco hornworms are considered pests because they feed on the upper leaves of tobacco plants and leave green or black droppings on the plants. As adults, they do not damage plants since they feed on nectar.

Tobacco hornworm larvae prefer humid environments. When dehydrated, tobacco hornworm larvae will move towards a source of water or to an area with a high relative level of humidity. They use their antennae to locate water to drink .

=== Defense ===
Nicotine is poisonous to most animals that use muscles to move because nicotine targets the acetylcholine receptor at the neuromuscular junction. However, the tobacco hornworm is capable of metabolizing nicotine from the tobacco plant and using nicotine as a defense against predators. It possesses a gene called cytochrome P450 6B46 (CYP6B46) that converts nicotine into a metabolite. About 0.65% of nicotine metabolites are transported from the gut to the hemolymph, where they are reconverted to nicotine and released into the air from the tobacco hornworm's spiracles. The emitted nicotine is used as a way to deter spiders, a practice known as “toxic halitosis.” In one study, tobacco hornworms that fed from nicotine-deficient plants or expressed low levels of CYP6B46 were more susceptible to wolf spider predation.

Tobacco hornworm caterpillars emit short clicking sounds from their mandibles when they are being attacked. This sound production is believed to be a type of acoustic aposematism, or warning sounds that let predators know that trying to eat them will be troublesome; tobacco hornworms have been observed to thrash and bite predators after producing those clicking sounds. These clicks can be heard at a close distance with a frequency range of 5 to 50 kHz. The intensity of clicks increases with the number of attacks (Bura et al., 2012).

== Gallery ==
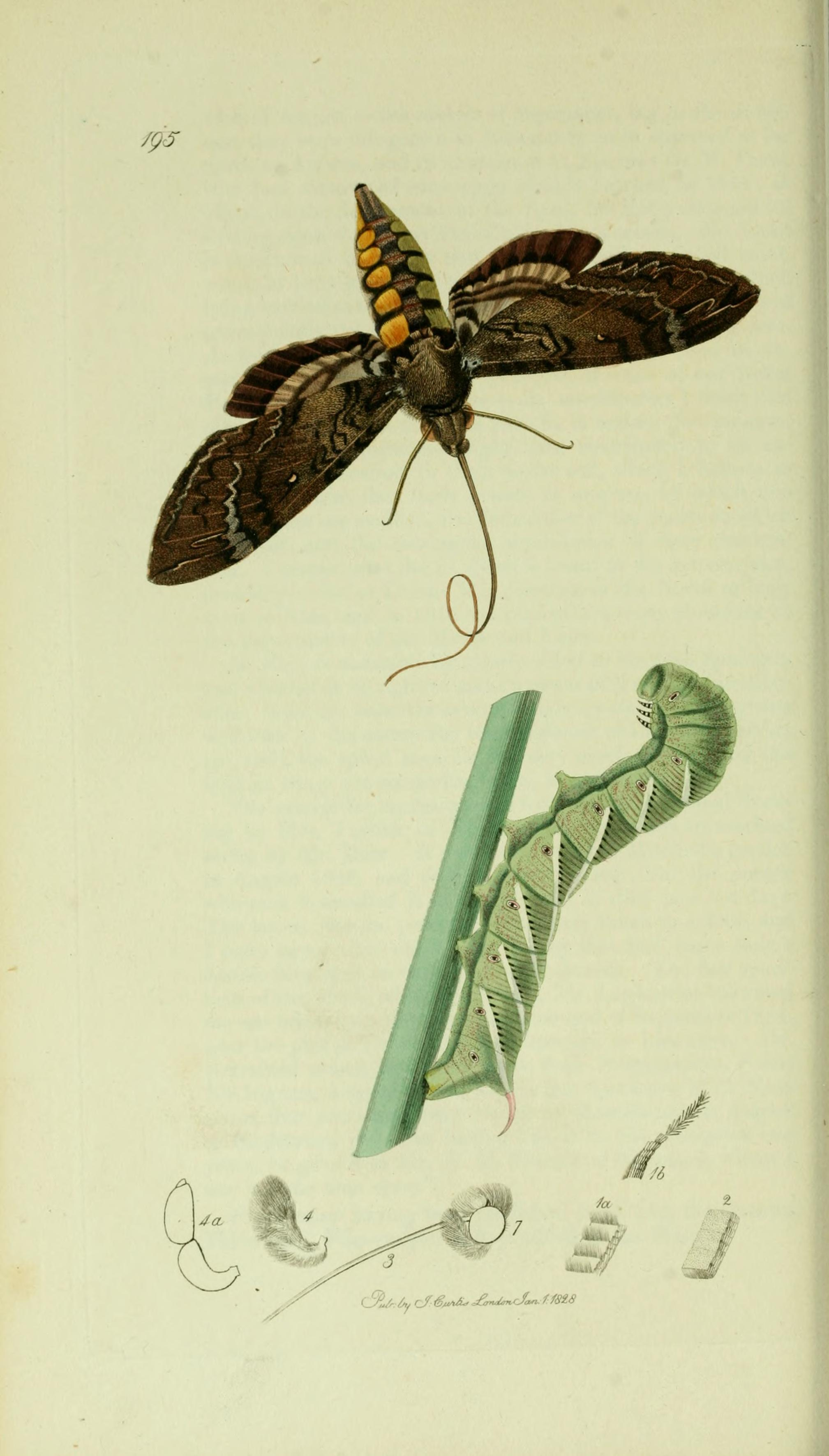
Illustration from John Curtis's British Entomology Volume 5, possibly the only British record for this species

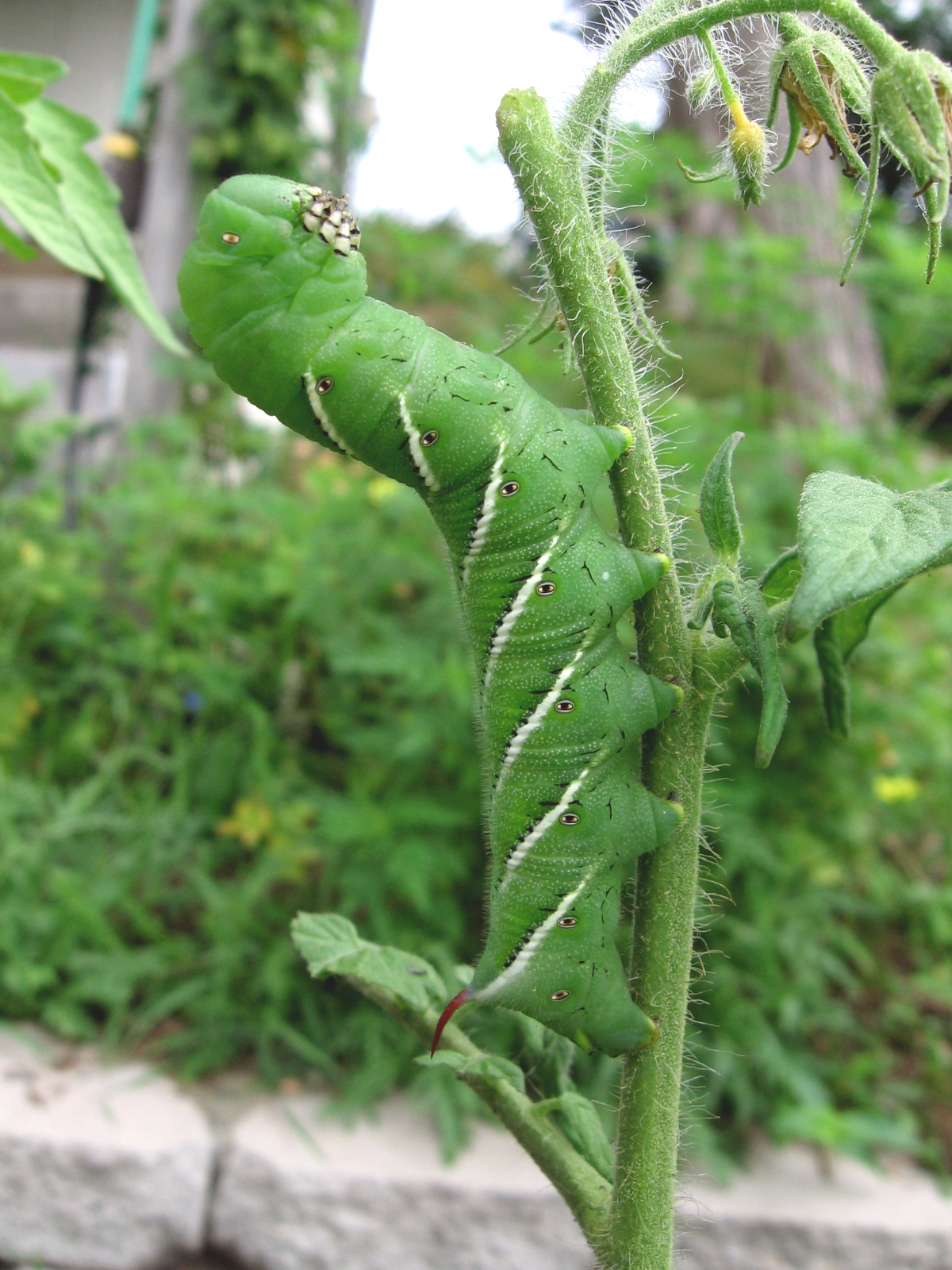
Feeding on tomato plant

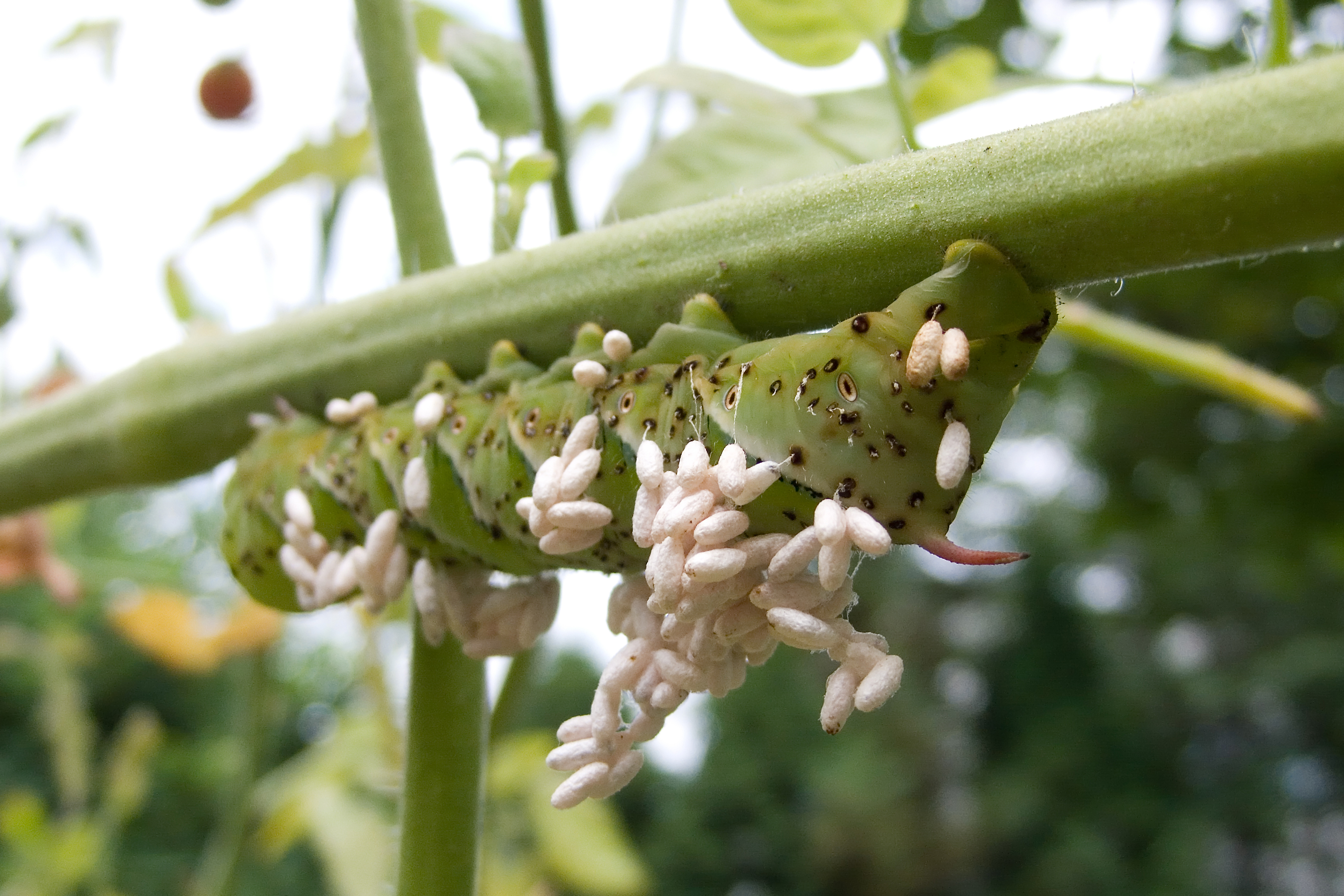
Manduca sexta parasitized by Cotesia congregata wasp larvae

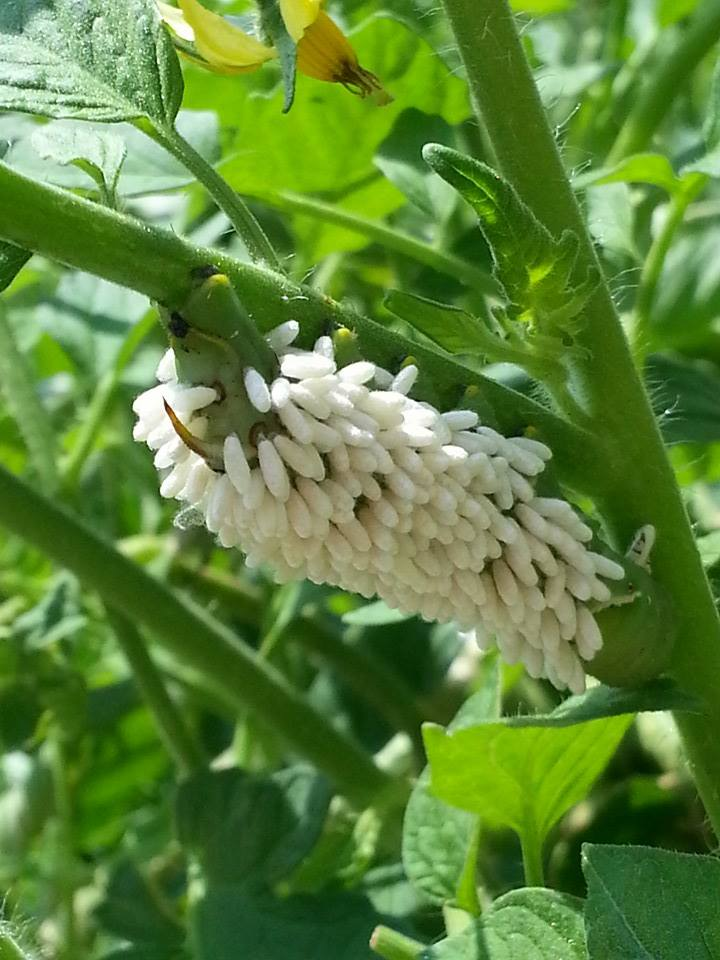
A tobacco hornworm with wasp cocoons

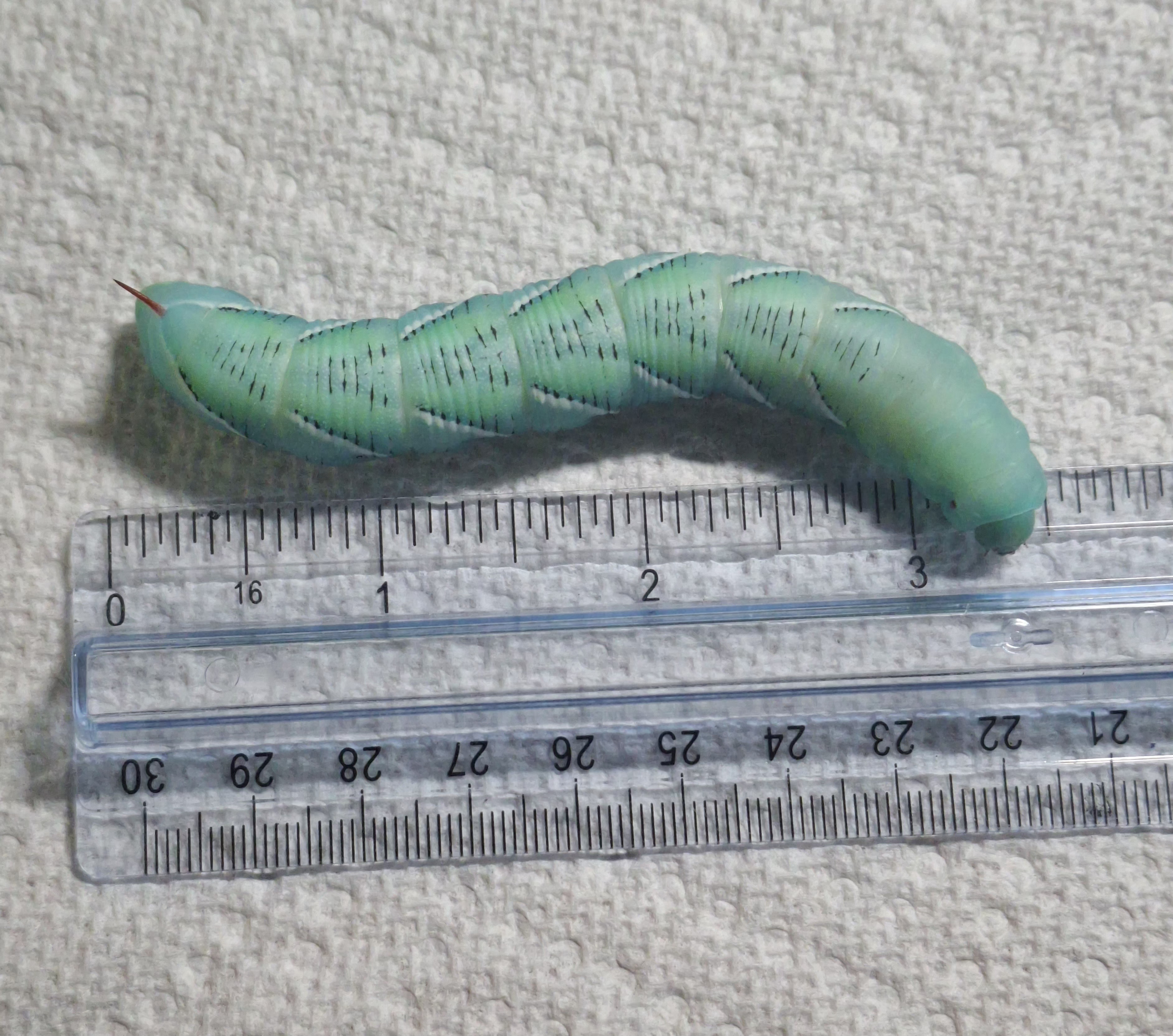
The average size of a late instar Manduca sexta caterpillar.

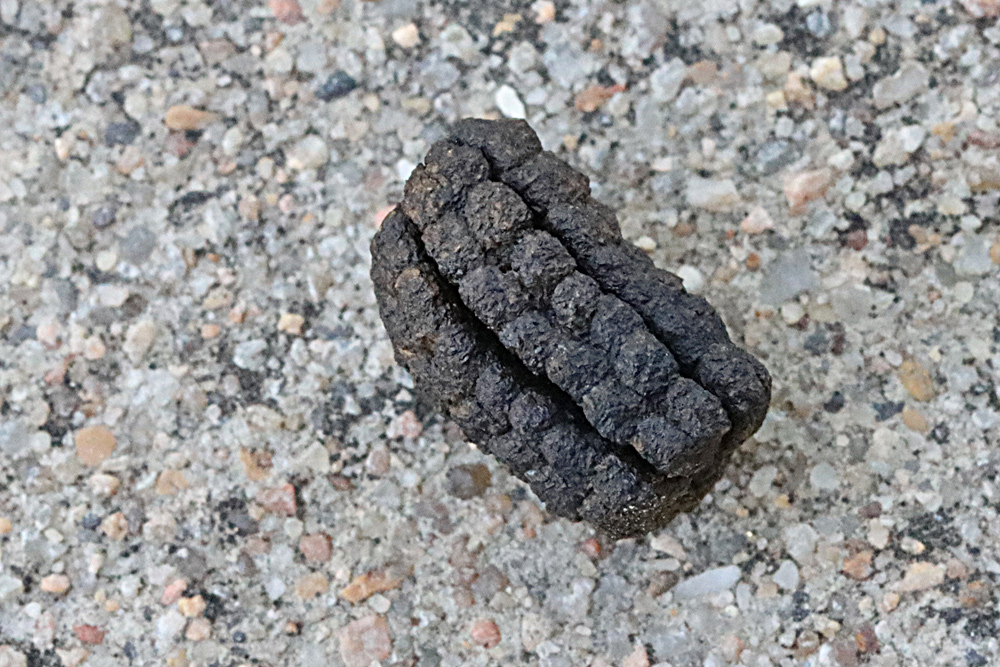
Typical frass with distinctive ridges

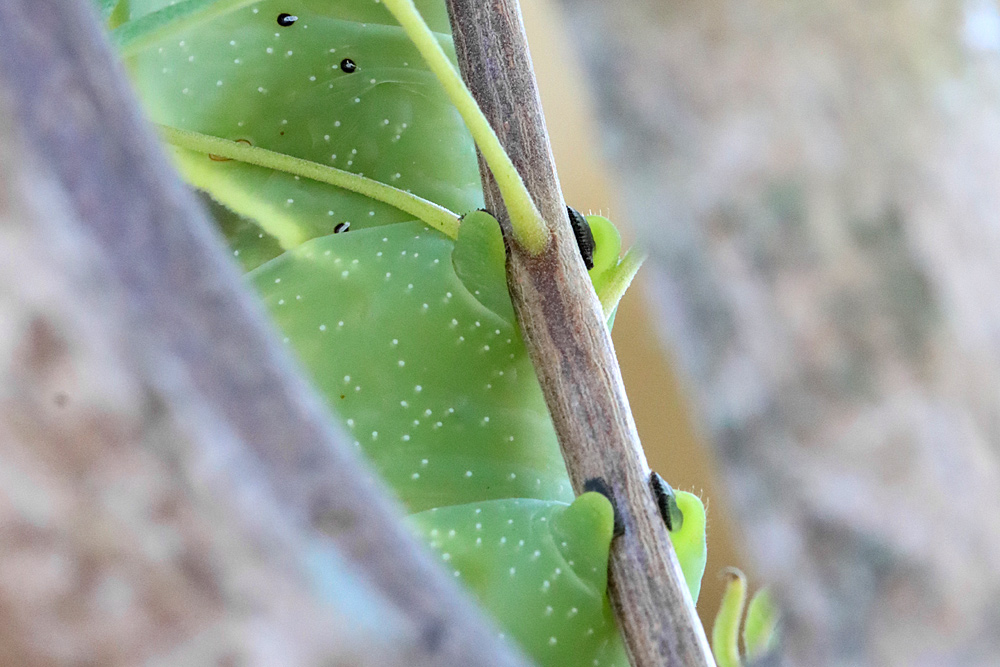
Detail of feet grasping twig

Pinned specimen of Manduca sexta
