= Magnetic resonance spectroscopic imaging =

Scientific imaging method

- Purpose: imaging method that provides spectroscopic information

Magnetic resonance spectroscopic imaging (MRSI) is a noninvasive imaging method that provides spectroscopic information in addition to the image that is generated by MRI alone.

Whereas traditional magnetic resonance imaging (MRI) generates a black-and-white image in which brightness is determined primarily by the T1 or T2 relaxation times of the tissue being imaged, the spectroscopic information obtained in an MRSI study can be used to infer further information about cellular activity (metabolic information). For example, in the context of oncology, an MRI scan may reveal the shape and size of a tumor, while an MRSI study provides additional information about the metabolic activity occurring in the tumor. MRSI can be performed on a standard MRI scanner, and the patient experience is the same for MRSI as for MRI. MRSI has broad applications in medicine, including oncology and general physiological studies.

When hydrogen is the target element, MRSI is also called 1H-nuclear magnetic resonance spectroscopic imaging and proton magnetic resonance spectroscopic imaging. MRSI can also be performed with phosphorus, or hyperpolarized carbon-13.

Magnetic resonance spectroscopy provides a window overlooking different biochemical processes that happen within the body. It is no longer restricted to solely being used in the field of research, and its applications in clinical practice are found to become increasingly common.

These biomedical applications of NMR, also known as nuclear magnetic resonance, are considered to be twofold: magnetic resonance imaging (MRI) and magnetic resonance spectroscopy (MRS).

Nuclear resonance occurs because the nuclei of at least one of the isotopes of most elements involved possess some sort of magnetic movement.

MRI is a non-invasive technique that provides us with information on T1 and T2, proton density, blood flow, perfusion of blood, and localized tissue temperature. MRS is a technique that provides us with information on tissue chemistry non-invasively.

Both MRI and MRS can yield information on over 40 physico-chemical variables. The past few decades have been spent trying to develop techniques for establishing estimates in these variables and establishing their significance in clinical research as well. They are both increasingly being used as a means of predicting the evolution of disease and guiding us through different possible interventions.

Many have started involving MRI techniques in treatment options for cancer.

However, the main disadvantage of MR is that it usually takes minutes for it to acquire the images, which can be an issue when doctors are trying to look at images of the heart under emergency situations.

MR is also found to be involved in more acute amounts of prediction in the stroke field. It is able define the zones of where the brain tissue can be seen as irrecoverable, and then provides data to clinicians to be able to make informed therapeutic decisions.
