= Hyperpolarized carbon-13 MRI =

Medical imaging technique

- Purpose: imaging technique for probing perfusion and metabolism

Hyperpolarized carbon-13 MRI is a functional medical imaging technique for probing perfusion and metabolism using injected substrates.

It is enabled by techniques for hyperpolarization of carbon-13-containing molecules using dynamic nuclear polarization and rapid dissolution to create an injectable solution. Following the injection of a hyperpolarized substrate, metabolic activity can be mapped based on enzymatic conversion of the injected molecule. In contrast with other metabolic imaging methods such as positron emission tomography, hyperpolarized carbon-13 MRI provides chemical as well as spatial information, allowing this technique to be used to probe the activity of specific metabolic pathways. This has led to new ways of imaging disease. For example, metabolic conversion of hyperpolarized pyruvate into lactate is increasingly being used to image cancerous tissues via the Warburg effect.

== Hyperpolarization ==
Hyperpolarization of ^{13}C for MRI is typically achieved using either dissolution dynamic nuclear polarization (dDNP) or parahydrogen-induced polarization (PHIP). Although "brute force" polarization methods also exist, they are far less commonly used.

In dDNP, imaging agents such as ^{13}C-pyruvate are physically mixed (but not chemically reacted) with a stable free radical known as a polarizing agent (PA). This mixture is cooled to cryogenic temperatures (~1 K) and subjected to a strong magnetic field (~3 T), which causes the unpaired electron of the PA to become highly polarized. Microwave radiation is then applied near the electron resonance frequency, enabling the transfer of polarization from the electron to the ^{13}C nuclei via hyperfine coupling (for more details on polarization transfer mechanisms, see Dynamic nuclear polarization).

In PHIP, hydrogen gas is cooled—typically to 77 K by passing it through a liquid nitrogen bath—resulting in a substantial population difference between the singlet (parahydrogen) and triplet (orthohydrogen) spin states. This difference, known as singlet order (SO), is long-lived and serves as a reservoir of polarization. Parahydrogen is then chemically added to molecules such as ^{13}C-pyruvate, and the singlet order is converted into ^{13}C polarization using tailored radiofrequency (RF) pulses.

== Dissolution and injection ==
Hyperpolarized samples of ^{13}C pyruvic acid are typically dissolved in some form of aqueous solution containing various detergents and buffering reagents. For example, in a study detecting tumor response to etoposide treatment, the sample was dissolved in 40 mM HEPES, 94 mM NaOH, 30 mM NaCl, and 50 mg/L EDTA.

=== Preclinical models ===
Hyperpolarized carbon-13 MRI is currently being developed as a potentially cost effective diagnostic and treatment progress tool in various cancers, including prostate cancer. Other potential uses include neuro-oncological applications such as the monitoring of real-time in vivo metabolic events.

=== Clinical trials ===
The majority of clinical studies utilizing ^{13}C hyperpolarization are currently studying pyruvate metabolism in prostate cancer, testing reproducibility of the imaging data, as well as feasibility of acquiring time.

== Imaging methods ==
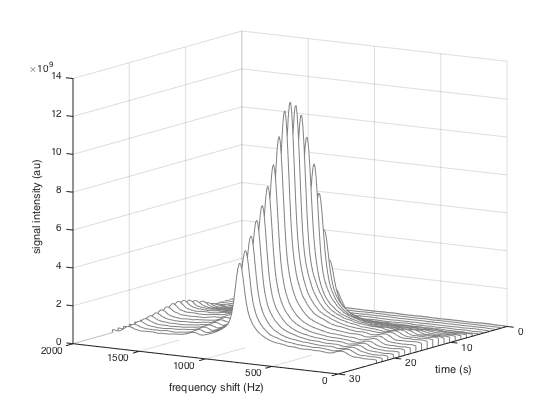
Sequence of NMR spectra from a dynamic hyperpolarized carbon-13 MR imaging experiment in a rat model. This data set shows the evolution of magnetization in a single voxel in the rat's kidney. A strong peak from the hyperpolarized pyruvate injected in the experiment is evident, along with smaller peaks corresponding to the metabolites lactate, alanine, and bicarbonate.

=== Spectroscopic imaging ===
Spectroscopic imaging techniques enable chemical information to be extracted from hyperpolarized carbon-13 MRI experiments. The distinct chemical shift associated with each metabolite can be exploited to probe the exchange of magnetization between pools corresponding to each of the metabolites.

=== Metabolite-selective excitation ===
Using techniques for simultaneous spatial and spectral selective excitation, RF pulses can be designed to perturb metabolites individually. This enables the encoding of metabolite-selective images without the need for spectroscopic imaging. This technique also allows different flip angles to be applied to each metabolite, which enables pulse sequences to be designed that make optimal use of the limited polarization available for imaging.

== Dynamic imaging models ==
In contrast with conventional MRI, hyperpolarized experiments are inherently dynamic as images must be acquired as the injected substrate spreads through the body and is metabolized. This necessitates dynamical system modelling and estimation for quantifying metabolic reaction rates. A number of approaches exist for modeling the evolution of magnetization within a single voxel.

	pyruvate	lactate	alanine
T1	~46.9–65 s dependent on B0 field strength		
T2 (HCC Tumor)		0.9 ± 0.2 s	1.2 ± 0.1 s
T2 (healthy liver)		0.52 ± 0.03 s	0.38 ± 0.05 s

=== Two-species model with unidirectional flux ===
The simplest model of metabolic flux assumes unidirectional conversion of the injected substrate S to a product P. The rate of conversion is assumed to be governed by the reaction rate constant $k_\ce{SP}$

$\ce{S ->[k_\ce{SP}] P}$.	1

Exchange of magnetization between the two species can then be modeled using the linear ordinary differential equation

$$\frac{d M_\ce{P}}{dt}(t) = -R_{1\ce P} M_P(t) + k_\ce{SP} M_S(t)$$

where $R_{1\ce P} = \frac{1}{T_{1\ce P}}$ denotes the rate at which the transverse magnetization decays to thermal equilibrium polarization, for the product species P.

=== Two-species model with bidirectional flux ===
The unidirectional flux model can be extended to account for bidirectional metabolic flux with forward rate $k_\ce{SP}$ and backward rate $k_{PS}$

$\ce{S <=>[k_\ce{SP}][k_\ce{PS}] P}$	2

The differential equation describing the magnetization exchange is then

$$\frac{d M_\ce{P}}{dt}(t) = -R_{1\ce P} M_\ce{P}(t) -k_\ce{PS} M_\ce{P}(t) + k_\ce{SP} M_\ce{S}(t).$$

=== Effect of radio-frequency excitation ===
Repeated radio-frequency (RF) excitation of the sample causes additional decay of the magnetization vector. For constant flip angle sequences, this effect can be approximated using a larger effective rate of decay computed as

$$R_{1\ce{P, eff}} = R_{1\ce P} - \frac{\log(\cos \alpha)}{TR}$$

where $\alpha$ is the flip angle and $TR$ is the repetition time. Time-varying flip angle sequences can also be used, but require that the dynamics be modeled as a hybrid system with discrete jumps in the system state.

== Metabolism mapping ==
The goal of many hyperpolarized carbon-13 MRI experiments is to map the activity of a particular metabolic pathway. Methods of quantifying the metabolic rate from dynamic image data include temporally integrating the metabolic curves, computing the definite integral referred to in pharmacokinetics as the area under the curve (AUC), and taking the ratio of integrals as a proxy for rate constants of interest.

=== Area-under-the-curve ratio ===
Comparing the definite integral under the substrate and product metabolite curves has been proposed as an alternative to model-based parameter estimates as a method of quantifying metabolic activity. Under specific assumptions, the ratio

$$\ce{\frac{AUC(P)}{AUC(S)}}$$

of area under the product curve AUC(P) to the area under the substrate curve AUC(S) is proportional to the forward metabolic rate $k_\ce{SP}$.

=== Rate parameter mapping ===
When the assumptions under which this ratio is proportional to $k_{PL}$ are not met, or there is significant noise in the collected data, it is desirable to compute estimates of model parameters directly. When noise is independent and identically distributed and Gaussian, parameters can be fit using non-linear least squares estimation. Otherwise (for example if magnitude images with Rician-distributed noise are used), parameters can be estimated by maximum likelihood estimation. The spatial distribution of metabolic rates can be visualized by estimating metabolic rates corresponding to the time series from each voxel, and plotting a heat map of the estimated rates.

== See also ==
- Carbon-13 nuclear magnetic resonance
- Dynamic nuclear polarization
- Functional imaging
- Magnetic resonance spectroscopic imaging
