= Functional imaging =

Medical imaging technique

- Purpose: measuring changes in metabolism

Functional imaging (or physiological imaging) is a medical imaging technique of detecting or measuring changes in metabolism, blood flow, regional chemical composition, and absorption. Functional imaging can complement structural imaging by providing information about physiological processes, and in clinical practice different modalities may be combined to characterize function and pathology.

As opposed to structural imaging, functional imaging centers on revealing physiological activities within a certain tissue or organ by employing medical image modalities that very often use tracers or probes to reflect spatial distribution of them within the body. These tracers are often analogous to some chemical compounds, like glucose, within the body. To achieve this, isotopes are used because they have similar chemical and biological characteristics. By appropriate proportionality, the nuclear medicine physicians can determine the real intensity of certain substances within the body to evaluate the risk or danger of developing some diseases.

== Modalities ==
- Positron emission tomography (PET)
  - Fludeoxyglucose for Glucose metabolism
  - O-15 as a flow tracer
- Single-photon emission computed tomography (SPECT)
- Computed tomography (CT) perfusion imaging
- Functional magnetic resonance imaging (fMRI)
  - BOLD
  - Diffusion MRI
  - Perfusion (blood flow)
  - Arterial spin labeling MRI
  - Blood volume
  - Hyperpolarized carbon-13 MRI
- Functional photoacoustic microscopy (fPAM)
- Magnetic particle imaging (MPI)
- Optical imaging
  - Near-infrared spectroscopy (NIRS)

== See also ==
- Biomedical engineering
- Medical imaging
- PET-CT
- Radiology
- Functional neuroimaging
