= Keith Matthews (biologist) =

British biologist

Professor Keith Matthews FRS FRSE FMedSci
- Born: 24 June 1964 (age 62)
- Education: University of Glasgow; Brunel University
- Known for: Trypanosomes in sleeping sickness
- Scientific career
- Fields: Cell biology; Parasitology
- Workplaces: University of Manchester; University of Edinburgh; Yale University
- Thesis: Metacyclic VSG gene activation in Trypanosoma brucei rhodesiense (1990)
- Doctoral advisor: David Barry
- Website: Official website

Keith Roland Matthews (born 24 June 1964) is a British cell biologist and parasitologist, currently a professor of parasite biology in the School of Biological Sciences at the University of Edinburgh. His research focuses on African trypanosomes (protozoan parasites spread by the tsetse fly), which cause human sleeping sickness and the equivalent cattle disease nagana.

== Early life and career ==
Matthews took a B.Sc. in biology (1986) at Brunel University, followed by a Ph.D. in genetics (1990) at the University of Glasgow, working with David Barry on metacyclic variant surface glycoprotein (VSG) regulation in Trypanosoma brucei rhodesiense. In 1990, he became NATO Fellow (Epidemiology and Public Health) at Yale University before moving to the University of Manchester in 1992, where he set up his own laboratory four years later. In 2004, he relocated to the University of Edinburgh, where he has been Professor of Parasite Biology since 2007. He is also Director of the Centre for Immunity, Infection, and Evolution (CIIE), Head of Institute for Immunology and Infection Research (IIIR), and a Wellcome Trust Senior Investigator.

== Research interests ==
Matthews researches African trypanosomes and how these parasites communicate to optimize their survival and transmission. In particular, he has researched how trypanosomes change from a "slender" form (to increase parasitaemia) into a "stumpy" form that is better adapted for transmission to and survival in tsetse flies.

== Awards ==
Matthews was awarded the 2008 British Society for Parasitology C. A. Wright Memorial Medal, the 2015 Sanofi Pasteur International Research Award for his contributions to infectious disease research and the 2023 Alice and C. C. Wang award in Molecular parasitology. He was elected Fellow of the Royal Society of Edinburgh in 2014, Fellow of the Academy of Medical Sciences in 2018, and Fellow of the Royal Society in 2020. According to his Academy of Medical Sciences citation, Matthews' work "has led to fundamental breakthroughs in our understanding of the molecular mechanisms that control trypanosome transmission and virulence".

== Selected publications ==
- Ivens, Alasdair C.; Peacock, Christopher S.; Worthey, Elizabeth A.; Murphy, Lee; Aggarwal, Gautam; et al. (15 July 2005). "The Genome of the Kinetoplastid Parasite, Leishmania major". Science. 309 (5733): 436–442. Bibcode:2005Sci...309..436I. doi:10.1126/science.1112680. eISSN 1095-9203. ISSN 0036-8075. PMC 1470643. PMID 16020728.
- Matthews, Keith R. (15 January 2005). "The developmental cell biology of Trypanosoma brucei". Journal of Cell Science. 118 (2): 283–290. doi:10.1242/jcs.01649. eISSN 1477-9137. ISSN 0021-9533. PMC 2686837. PMID 15654017.
- Matthews, K R; Tschudi, C; Ullu, E (15 February 1994). "A common pyrimidine-rich motif governs trans-splicing and polyadenylation of tubulin polycistronic pre-mRNA in trypanosomes". Genes & Development. 8 (4): 491–501. doi:10.1101/gad.8.4.491. eISSN 1549-5477. ISSN 0890-9369. PMID 7907303.
