= Monastic garden =

Kitchen garden and ornamental garden in a monastery

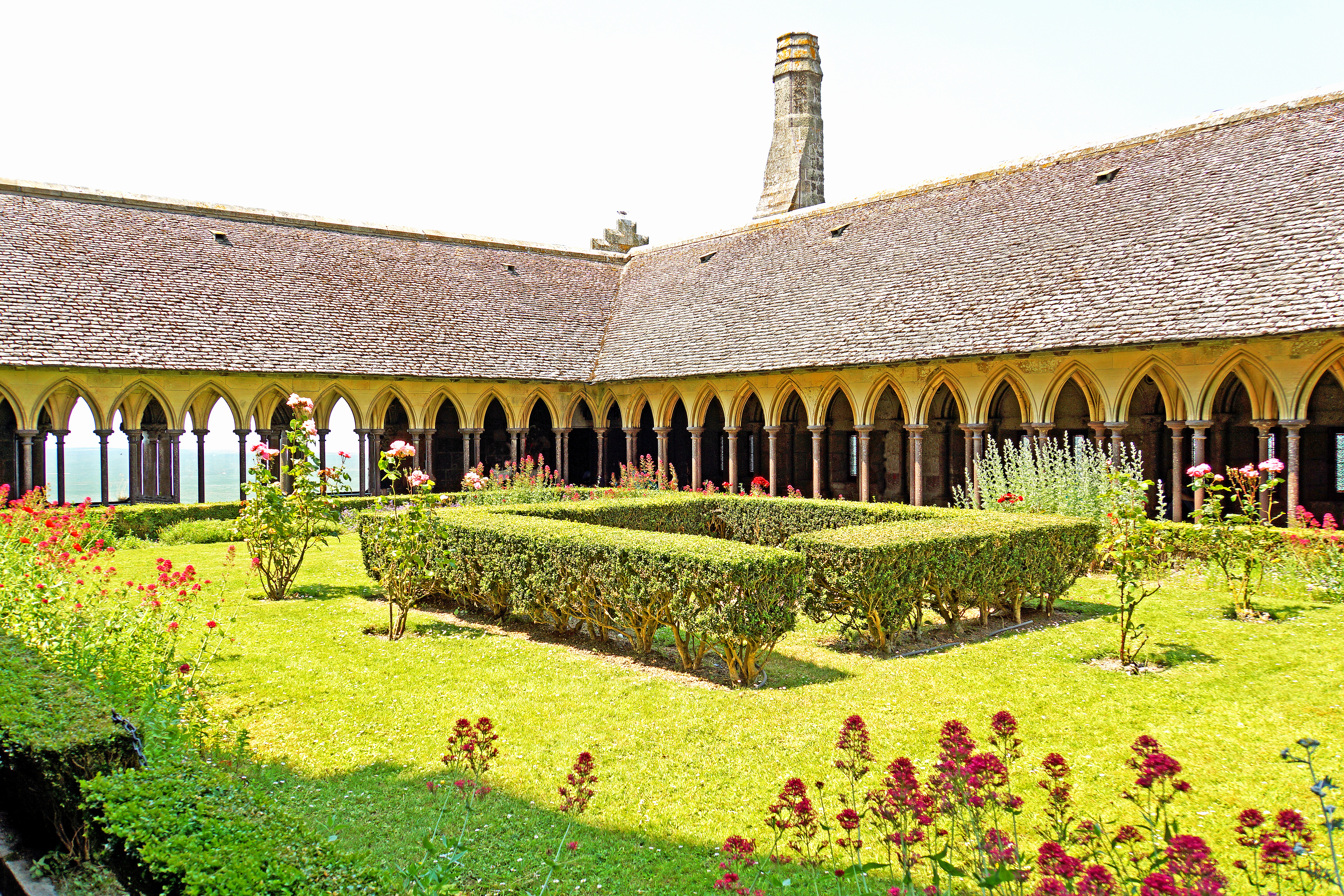
Contemplative garden at the Mont Saint Michel Abbey as recreated in 1966, featuring boxwood and Damask roses

A monastic garden was used by many people and for multiple purposes. Medieval gardens were an important source of food for households, but also encompassed orchards, cemeteries and pleasure gardens, as well as providing plants for medicinal and cultural uses. Many monasteries owned considerable holdings of agricultural land and woodland, which were increasingly worked by peasants in much the same way as the estates of secular landlords, with monks probably more likely to develop commercial specialties such as medicinal plants and vegetables. Gardens within the monastery enclosure were sometimes important in supplying the monks' livelihoods, primarily because many of the plants had multiple uses: for instance, peaches were used for cleansing wounds.

There is no real evidence for the very common modern idea that monastic cloisters were richly planted, though many had wells. Cloisters were for reading and contemplation, and plants and flowers would have been considered unwelcome distractions here.

== The garden ==
Like other medieval gardens, they were generally enclosed with fences, walls or hedges in order to protect them from wild animals. Even though wealthier monasteries could construct walls that were made out of stone and brick, wattle fences were used by all classes and were the most common type of fence. Occasionally, bushes were also used as fencing, as they provided both food and protection to the garden. Gardens were typically arranged to allow for visitors, and were constructed with pathways for easy access. However, it was not uncommon for the gardens to outgrow the monastery walls, and many times the gardens extended outside of the monastery and would eventually include vineyards as well.

Incorporating irrigation and water sources was critical to keeping the garden alive. In some more complicated systems, the irrigation system used canals to control water-flow. This required that the water source be placed at the highest part of the garden so gravity could aid in the distribution of the water, with smaller canal channels branching out for greater distribution. This was more commonly used with raised bed gardens, as the channels could run in the pathways next to the beds.

When it came to the action of gardening itself, monks of this time typically would use astronomy and the stars to help in calculating the best time of year to plant their gardens as well as the best time to harvest. The tools that were used at the time were similar to those gardeners use today; For example, shears, rakes, hoes, spades, baskets, and wheel barrows were used by monks and are still pivotal to gardening today.

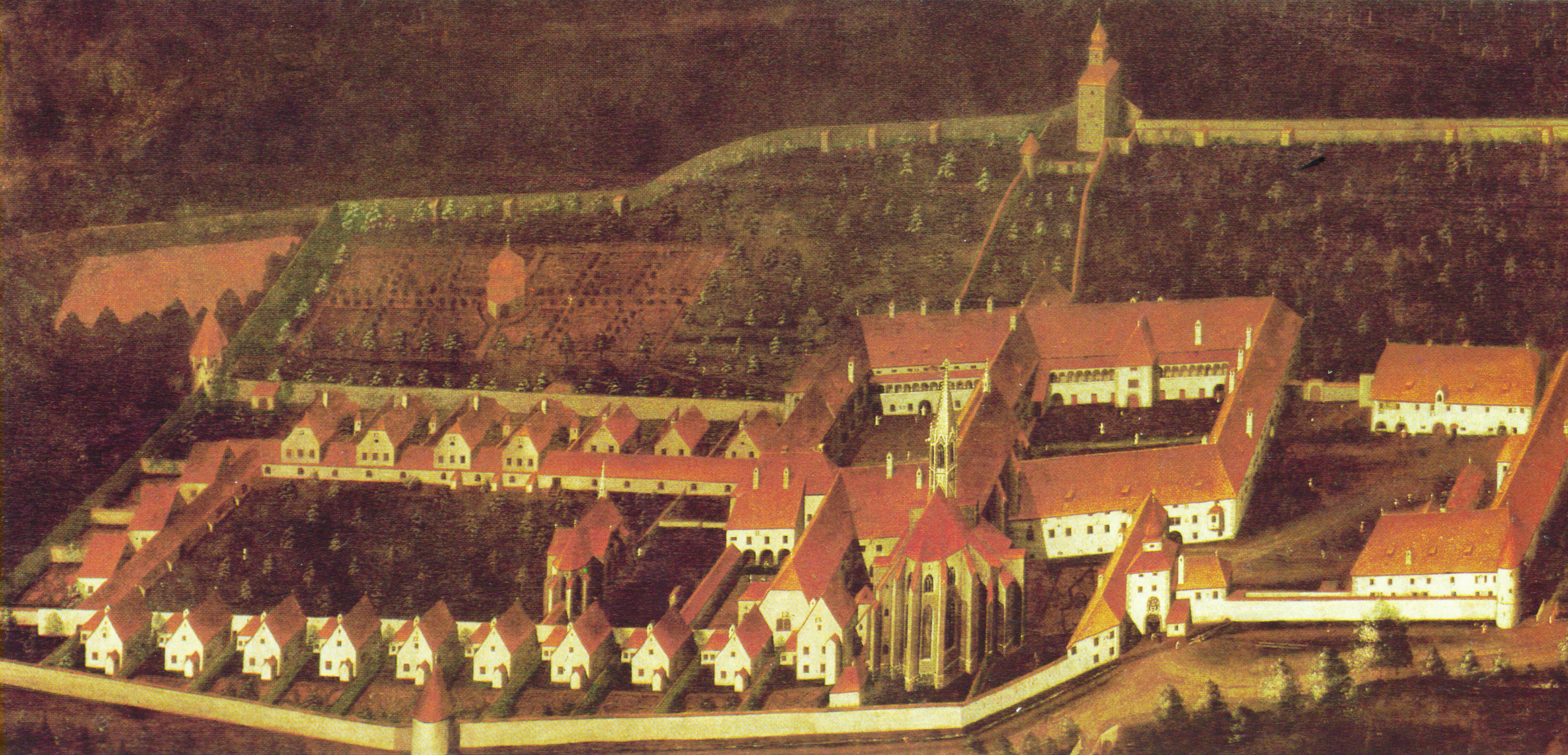
The enclosure of the Gaming Charterhouse, Austria, 17th-century, showing the individual cells' gardens and the communal areas

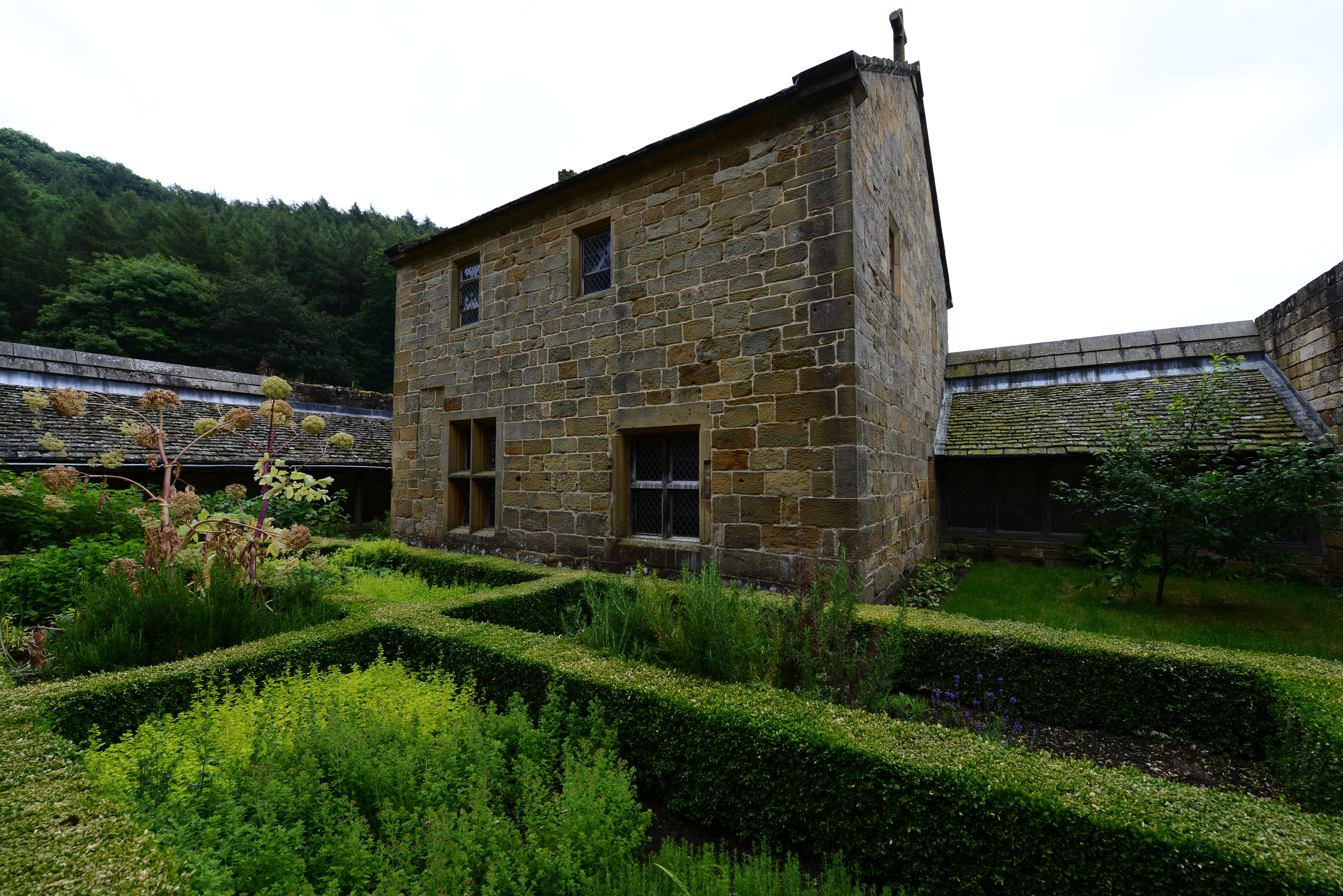
Garden of the reconstructed monks' cell at the Carthusian Mount Grace Priory

Monks of the "contemplative" Carthusian Order lived in their "cells" or small houses, each with a small garden. A number of these survive, for example at the Certosa di Pavia in Italy. These do not seem large enough to have produced all a monk's food, and at least bulk carbohydrate foods from the monastic estates were probably added, as well as fruit from orchards on communal areas.

=== Medicinal ===
Many medical practices migrated, and assimilated, into medieval Europe from the Islamic world as a result of the Islamic translation effort. As a result, gardening was particularly important for medicinal use. For example, when the peel of the poppy stalk was ground and mixed with honey, it could be used as a plaster for wounds. Other herbs and plants, such as roses, lilies, sage, rosemary and other aromatic herbs, were used for internal complications, such as a headache or stomachache. Almonds were said to aid sleep, provoke urination, and induce menstruation.

In practice, monks used these medicinal herbs not only for themselves, but also to help heal the local community. One prominent healer was Hildegard of Bingen, an abbess who lived in a double monastery with separate communities of men and women. Eventually she was elected magistra and would later care for her own secluded monastery. Besides her extensive writing, Hildegard was regularly visited by people throughout Europe, including Henry II of England, the Holy Roman Emperor, and the empress of Byzantium, as well as the local community. Hildegard was seen as the “first woman physician” because of her work as a healer and medical writings.

=== Food ===
Monasteries would also rely on their gardens to grow the food the monks needed. Monastic gardens tried to grow produce that was both medically beneficial and appetizing, with vegetables high in starch or in flavor being sought after the most. Some commonly found vegetables include:

Leek (Allium porum)	Roman Cabbage (Brassica oleracea Botrytis group – Romanesco broccoli)
Onion (Allium cepa)	Cauliflower/Cole Wort (Brassica oleracea Botrytis group – cauliflower)
Garlic (Allium sativum)	Rapeseed (Brassica napus)
Shallots (Shallot)	Turnips (Brassica rapa rapa)
Carrots (Daucus carota subsp. sativus)	White Beet (Beta vulgaris)
Parsnips (Pastinaca sativa)	Radish (Raphanus raphanistrum subsp. sativus)
Chives (Allium schoenoprasum)	Fennel (Foeniculum azoricum)
Kale (Brassica oleracea Acephala group– kale)	White Pea (Pisum sativum - Field pea)
White/headed Cabbage (Brassica oleracea Capitata group – cabbage)	Green Pea (Pisum sativum - Garden Pea)
Heart Cabbage (Description - Cabbage)	Beans (Faba vulgaris)

=== Cemetery gardens ===
In most cases, cemetery gardens were also a type of garden found in medieval monasteries. The vegetation would provide fruit, such as apples or pears, as well as manual labor for the monks as was required by the Rule of Saint Benedict. Cemetery gardens, which tended to be very similar to generic orchards, acted as a symbol of Heaven and Paradise, thus providing spiritual meaning and righteous labor.

== Historical evidence ==
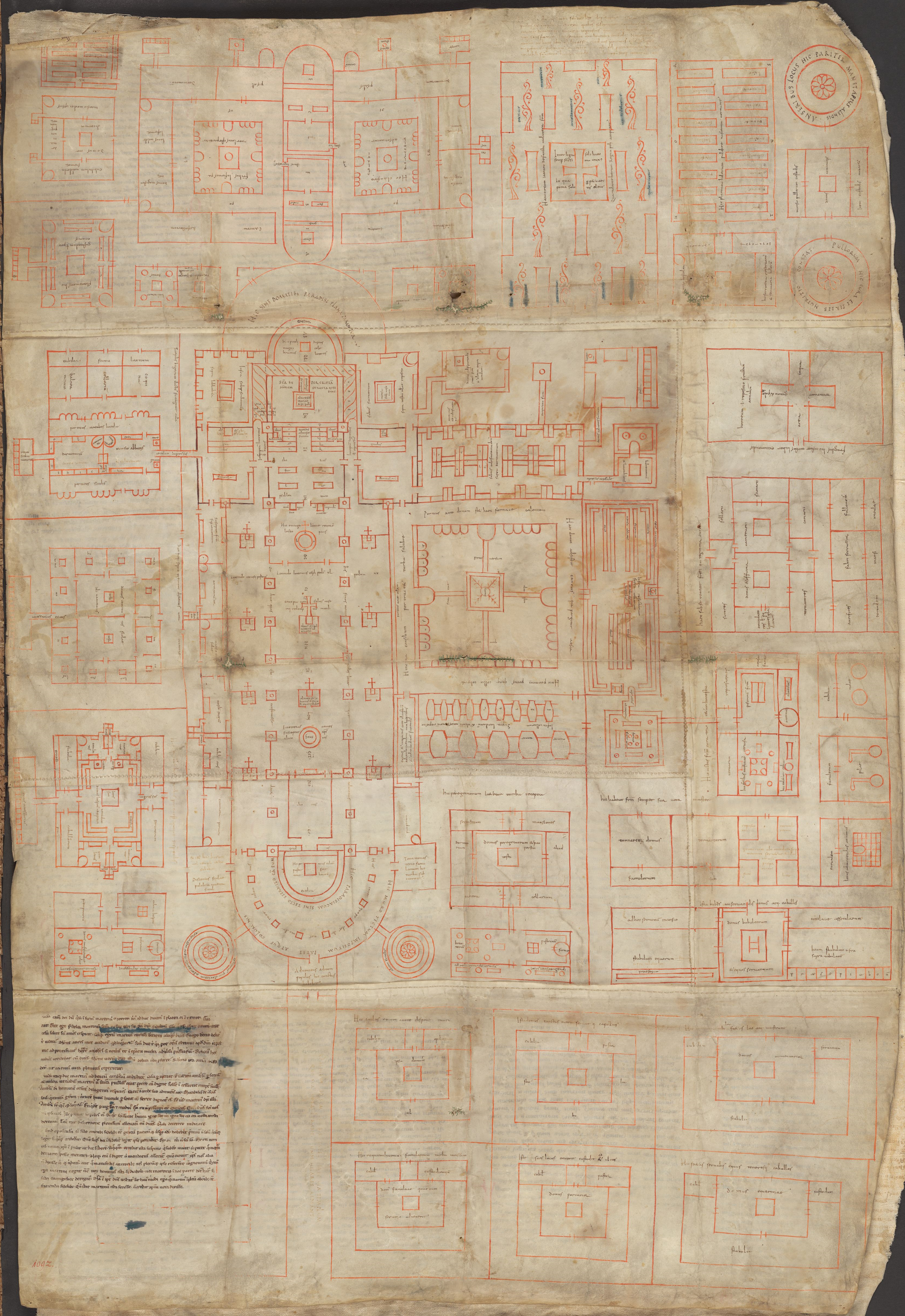
Plan of St Gall

The majority of data about monastic gardens can be found in the Middle Ages, primarily through archaeology, textual documentation, and artworks such as paintings, tapestry and illuminated manuscripts. The early Middle Ages brings a surprisingly clear snapshot of gardening at the time of Charlemagne with the survival of three important documents: the Capitulare de villis, Walafrid Strabo's poem Hortulus, and the famous plan of St Gall. The last was probably a projected plan, never actually created, but showing the ambitions of contemporary monks; it depicts three garden areas and lists what was grown. Further evidence can be found in dilapidated ruins of old monastic infirmaries, where some flowers, like peonies, have been found growing in large patches.

== Primary sources on gardening ==
- "Apuleius", a late Roman translation of ancient Greek Herbal material, revived in England from the 11th century.
- Charlemagne, Capitulare de villis (c. 800): listing the plants and estate style to be established throughout his empire. An imperial decree that leans heavily on classical sources; its impact is uncertain.
- Palladius, Late Roman author of Opus agriculturae, sometimes known as De re rustica. On farming rather than gardening. Translated into Middle English verse as On husbondrie. c. 1420
- Walahfrid Strabo, Hortulus, poem by a 9th-century German monk, praising his garden at Reichenau Abbey and listing its plants.
- Jon Gardener, The Feate of Gardening. c. 1400: poem containing plant lists and outlining gardening practices, probably by a royal gardener
- Friar Henry Daniel (14th century): compiled a list of plants
- Albertus Magnus, De vegetabilibus et plantis (c. 1260): rewrites De Plantis, a book then wrongly believed to be by Aristotle. Fundamental enquiry into the nature of plants, only peripherally concerned with how to grow them.
- Piero de' Crescenzi, Ruralium Commodorum Liber (c. 1305). The most important practical medieval work, still mostly about agriculture, and drawing heavily on classical sources. His experience came from buying a country estate, as a successful lawyer.
- 'Fromond List', original titled Herbys necessary for a gardyn (c. 1525): list of garden plants
- Thomas Hill (born c. 1528).
- Master Fitzherbert, The Booke of Husbandrie (1534): includes commentary on past horticultural practices
- T. Tusser, Five Hundred Points of Good Husbandry (1580): another relevant commentary though written in the post medieval period

== Further reading on medieval gardening ==
- Crisp, Frank; Mediaeval Gardens
- Landsberg, Sylvia; The Medieval Garden 1995
- Wright, Richardson; The Story of Gardening from the Hanging Gardens of Babylon to the Hanging Gardens of New York, 1934
- John Harvey; Mediaeval Gardens

== See also ==
- List of garden types
