= Acephala =

Acephala, Latin for "without a head", may refer to:

- Acephala group, a cultivar group of Brassica oleracea (cabbage) that grows without a central "head", including many varieties of kale, collard greens, and spring greens
- Acephala, Georges Cuvier's name for the class Bivalvia (which lack a head)
- Acephala (band), an Argentinian rock band formed in 2004
