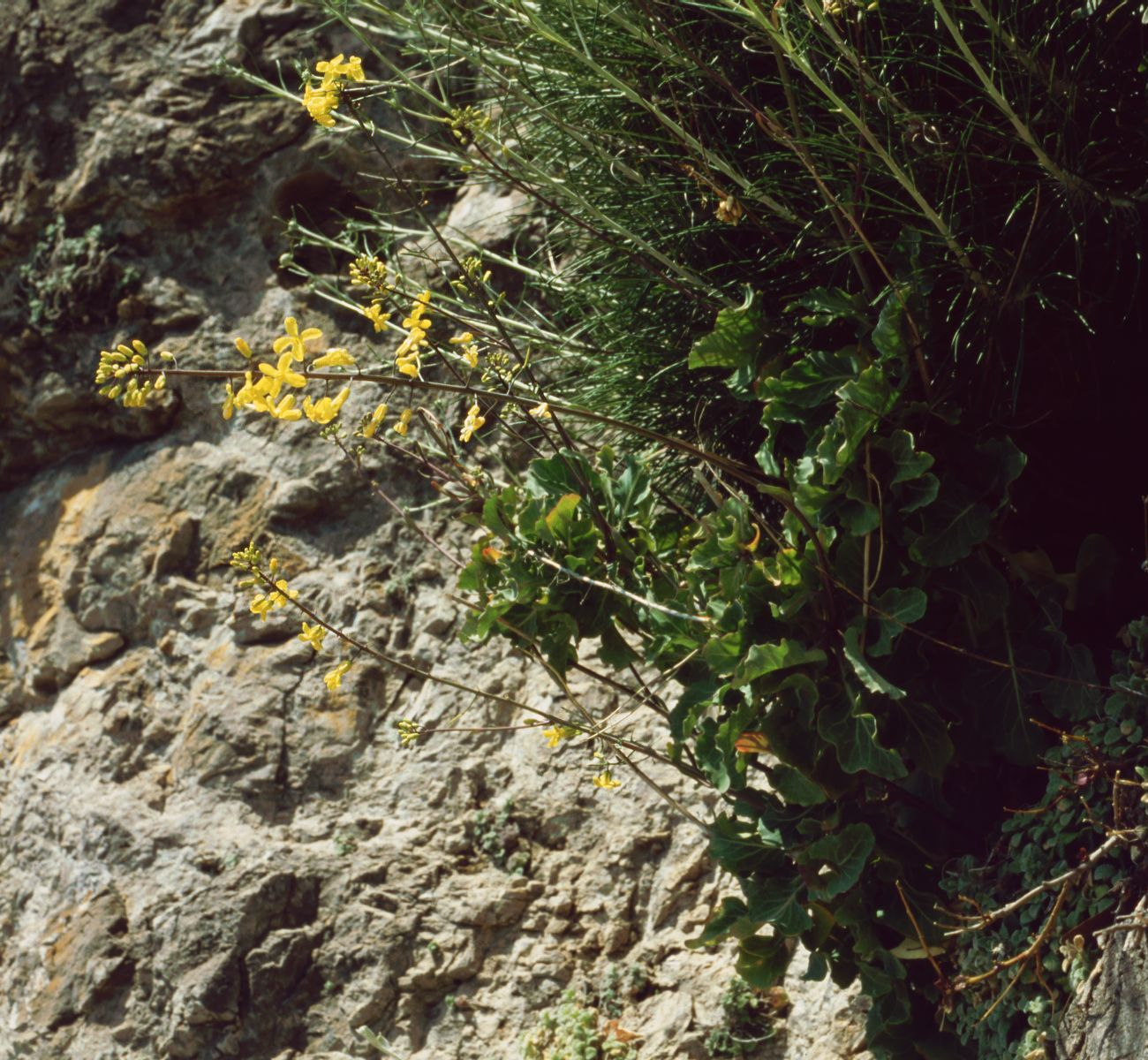
- Subsp. aegaea

Scientific classification
- Kingdom: Plantae
- Clade: Tracheophytes
- Clade: Angiosperms
- Clade: Eudicots
- Clade: Rosids
- Order: Brassicales
- Family: Brassicaceae
- Genus: Brassica
- Species: B. cretica

Binomial name
- Brassica cretica Lam.

Synonyms
- Brassica oleracea var. cretica (Lam.) Coss.

= Brassica cretica =

Species of plant

Brassica cretica is a species of flowering plant in the family Brassicaceae, native to the Eastern Mediterranean, particularly to Greece and the Aegean Islands. It was first described by Jean-Baptiste Lamarck in 1785. A 2021 study suggested that it was the origin of cultivated Brassica oleracea, with later admixture from other Brassica species.

== Subspecies ==
As of December 2022, Plants of the World Online recognized three subspecies:

- Brassica cretica subsp. aegaea (Heldr. & Halácsy) Snogerup, M.A.Gust. & Bothmer
- Brassica cretica subsp. cretica
- Brassica cretica subsp. laconica M.A.Gust. & Snogerup

Other sources have recognized only two subspecies, subsp. cretica and subsp. nivea (Boiss. & Spruner) M.A.Gust. & Snogerup. Some populations identified as B. cretica appear to be escapes from cultivation.
