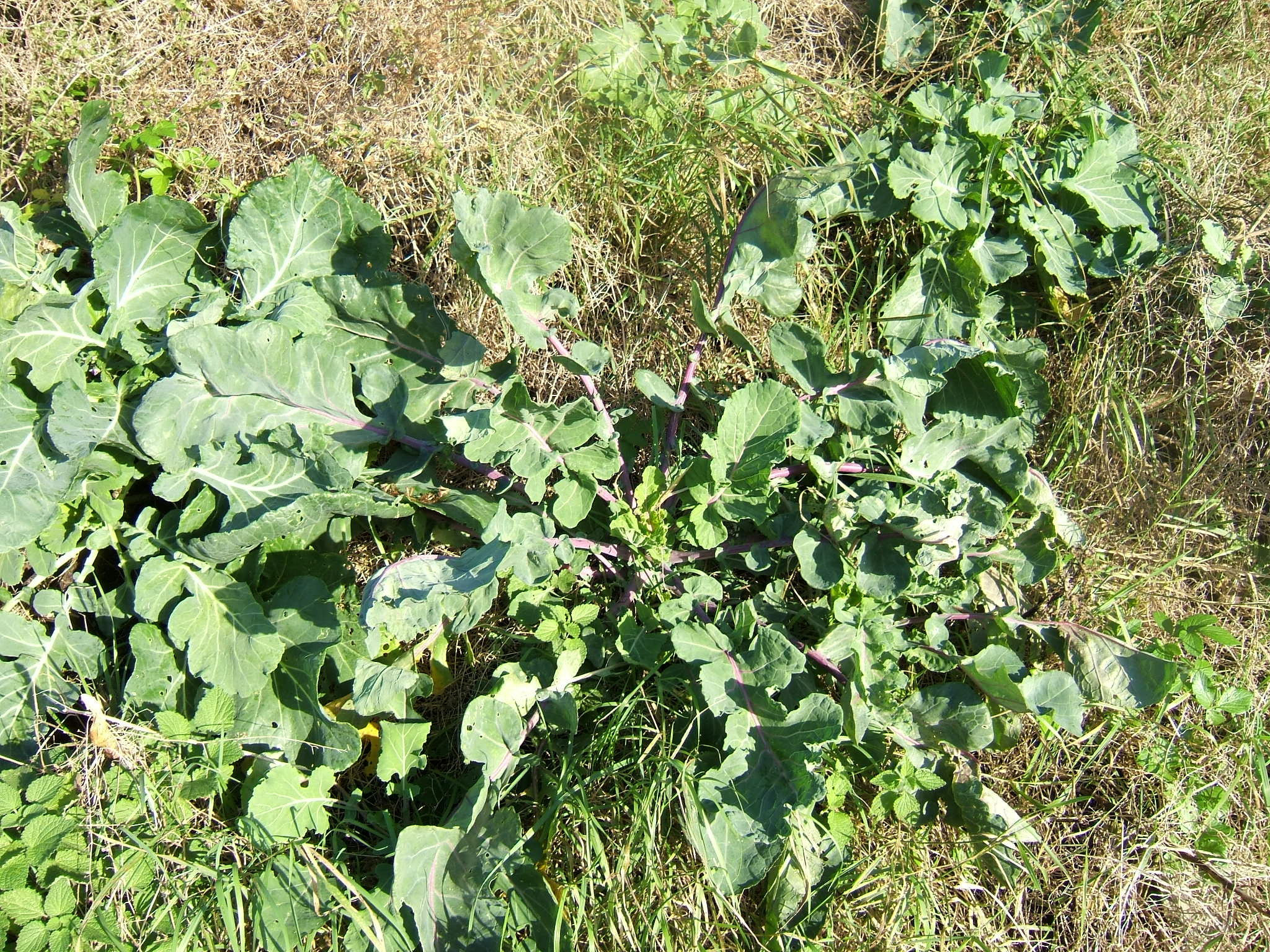
- Wild cabbage plants

Conservation status
- Data Deficient (IUCN 3.1)

Scientific classification
- Kingdom: Plantae
- Clade: Tracheophytes
- Clade: Angiosperms
- Clade: Eudicots
- Clade: Rosids
- Order: Brassicales
- Family: Brassicaceae
- Genus: Brassica
- Species: B. oleracea

Binomial name
- Brassica oleracea L.

Synonyms
- List: Brassica alboglabra L.H.Bailey; Brassica arborea Steud.; Brassica bullata Pasq.; Brassica capitala DC. ex H.Lév.; Brassica caulorapa (DC.) Pasq.; Brassica cephala DC. ex H.Lév.; Brassica fimbriata Steud.; Brassica gemmifera H.Lév.; Brassica laciniata Steud.; Brassica millecapitata H.Lév.; Brassica oleracea subsp. acephala (DC.) Metzg.; Brassica oleracea var. capitata L.; Brassica oleracea subsp. caulorapa (DC.) Metzg.; Brassica oleracea var. costata DC.; Brassica oleracea subsp. fruticosa Metzg.; Brassica oleracea var. gemmifera DC.; Brassica oleracea convar. gemmifera (DC.) Gladis ex Diederichsen; Brassica oleracea var. gongylodes L.; Brassica oleracea var. kashmiriana Naqshi & Javeid; Brassica oleracea var. laciniata L.; Brassica oleracea var. palmifolia DC.; Brassica oleracea var. rubra L.; Brassica oleracea var. sabauda L.; Brassica oleracea var. sabellica L.; Brassica oleracea var. viridis L.; Brassica quercifolia DC. ex H.Lév.; Brassica rubra Steud.; Brassica suttoniana H.Lév.; Brassica sylvestris (L.) Mill.; Crucifera brassica E.H.L.Krause; Napus oleracea (L.) K.F.Schimp. & Spenn.; Rapa rotunda Mill.; Raphanus brassica-officinalis Crantz

= Brassica oleracea =

Species of plant

Brassica oleracea, also known as wild cabbage in its uncultivated form, is a plant of the family Brassicaceae.

The species originated from feral populations of related plants in the Eastern Mediterranean, where it was most likely first cultivated. It has many common cultivars that are used as culinary vegetables, including cabbage, broccoli, cauliflower, romanesco, kale, Brussels sprout, collard, Savoy cabbage, kohlrabi, and gai lan.

== Description ==
Wild Brassica oleracea is a tall biennial or perennial plant that forms a stout rosette of large leaves in its first year. The grayish-green leaves are fleshy and thick, helping the plant store water and nutrients in difficult environments. In its second year, a woody spike grows up to 1.5 metres (5 ft) tall, from which branch off stems with long clusters of four-petaled yellow flowers.

== Taxonomy ==
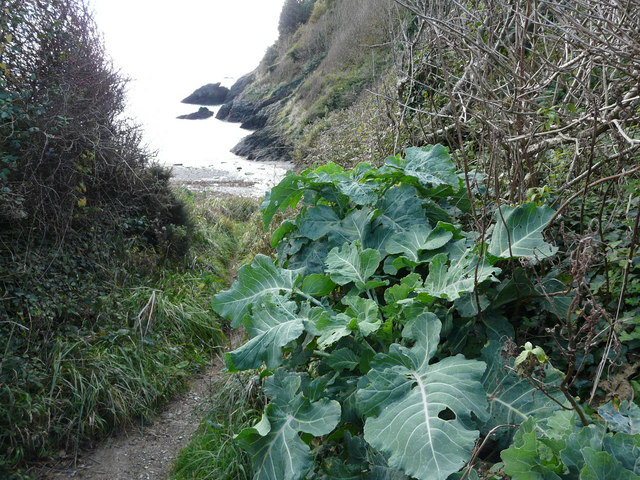
A large wild cabbage (B. oleracea var. oleracea) plant that grew near the sea at Mill Bay in East Portlemouth, Devon, England

=== Origins ===
According to the triangle of U theory, B. oleracea is very closely related to five other species of the genus Brassica. A 2021 study suggests that Brassica cretica, native to the Eastern Mediterranean, particularly Greece and the Aegean Islands, was the closest living relative of cultivated B. oleracea, thus supporting the view that its cultivation originated in the Eastern Mediterranean region, with later admixture from other Brassica species. Genetic analysis of nine wild populations on the French Atlantic coast indicated their common feral origin, deriving from domesticated plants escaped from fields and gardens.

The cultivars of B. oleracea are grouped by developmental form into several major cultivar groups, of which the Acephala ("non-heading") group remains most like the natural wild cabbage in appearance.

=== Etymology ===
"Brassica" was Pliny the Elder's name for several cabbage-like plants.

Its specific epithet oleracea means 'vegetable/herbal' in Latin and is a form of holeraceus (oleraceus).

== Distribution and habitat ==
Wild cabbage is considered to be native only to the coasts of France, Great Britain, and Spain, although widely naturalized elsewhere. Although rarely abundant, wild cabbage is also found on the coasts of Ireland, Italy, and the German island of Heligoland.

Wild cabbage is a hardy plant with high tolerance for salt and lime. Its intolerance of competition from other plants typically restricts its natural occurrence to limestone sea cliffs, like the chalk cliffs on both sides of the English Channel.

== Cultivation ==
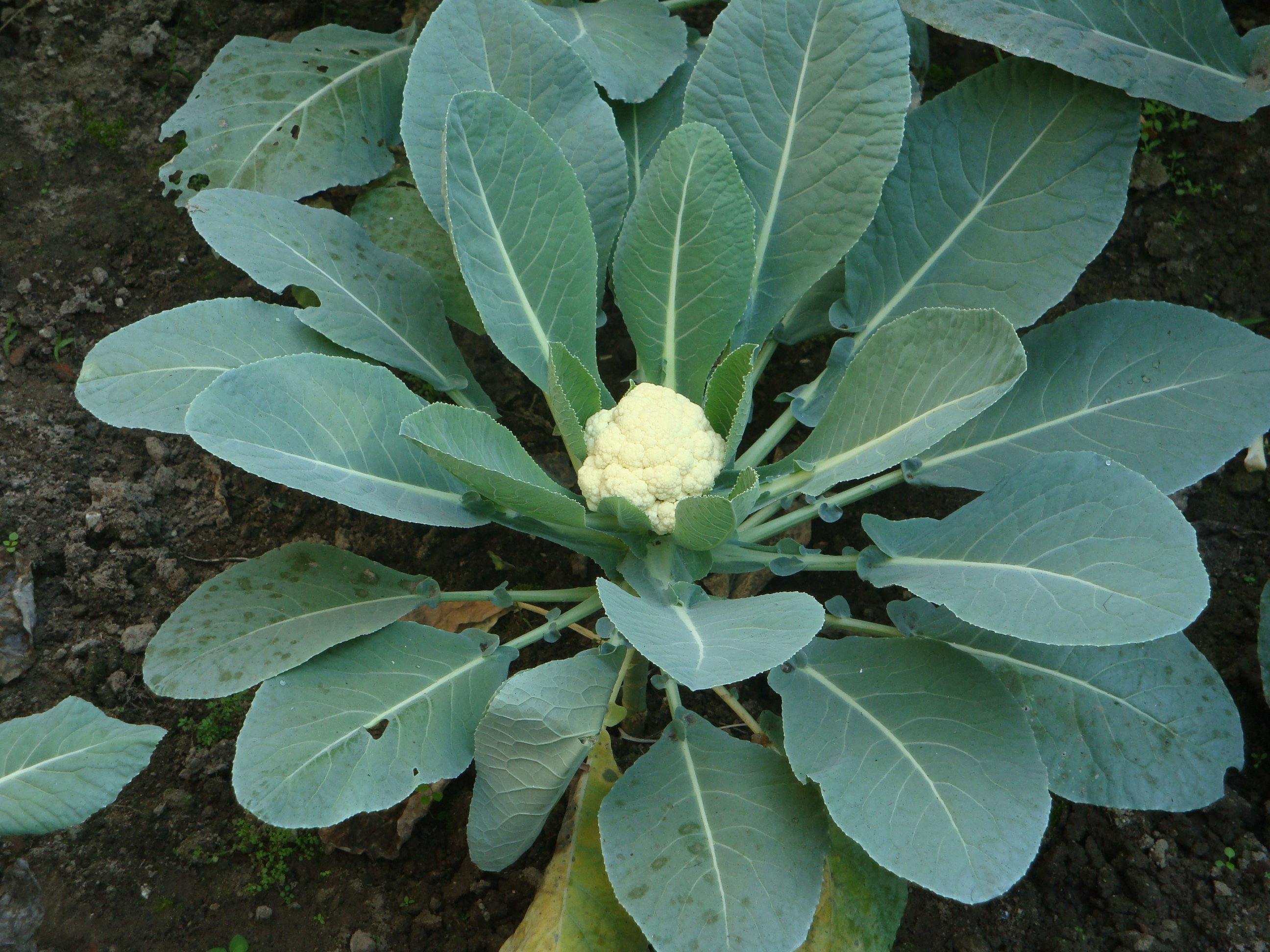
Head of B. oleracea Botrytis group (cauliflower) growing

The species has become established as an important human food crop, used because of its large food reserves, which are stored over the winter in its leaves. It has been bred into a wide range of cultivars, including cabbage, broccoli, cauliflower, brussels sprouts, collards, and kale, some of which are hardly recognizable as being members of the same genus, let alone species. The historical genus of Crucifera, meaning "cross-bearing" in reference to the four-petaled flowers, may be the only unifying feature beyond taste.

The plant is tolerant of a variety of soil conditions between pH 6.0 and 7.5, but grows particularly well in alkaline soils in full sunlight, with good drainage and high amounts of nitrogen. The plant can grow in partial shade, but care must be taken to provide sufficient ventilation, as this reduces the prevalence of downy mildew.

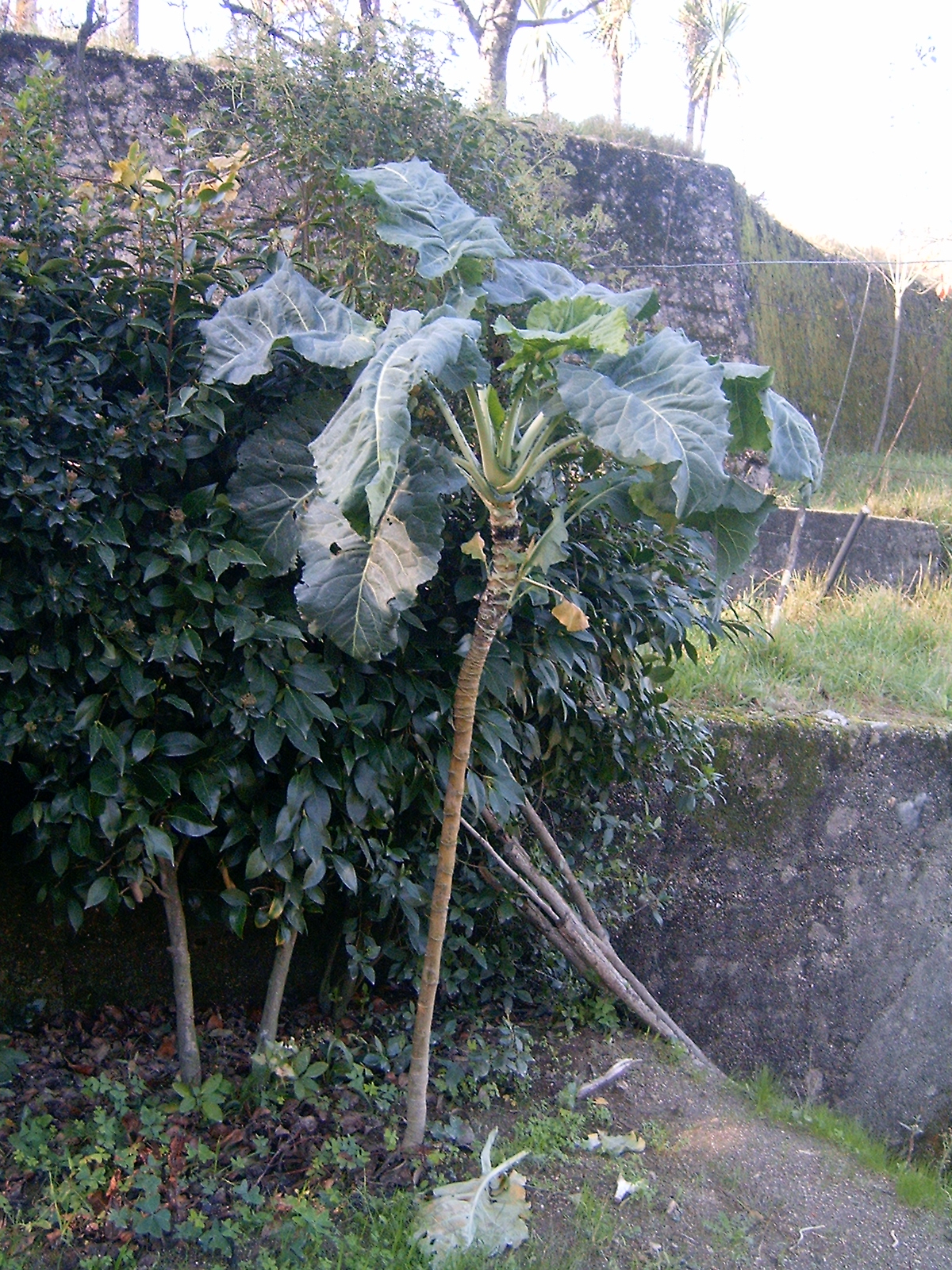
Couve-galega (ex. Brassica oleracea var. acephala DC.) for the Portuguese caldo verde

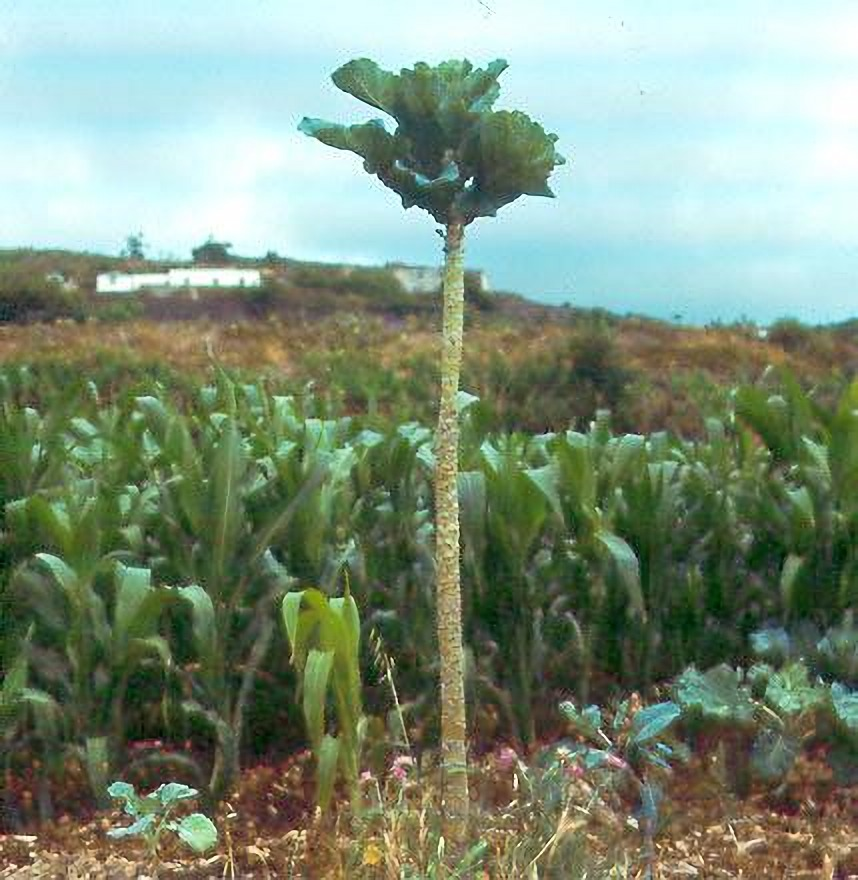
Jersey cabbage can be cultivated to grow quite large, especially in frost-free climates

=== History ===
Researchers believe that B. oleracea has been cultivated for several thousand years, but its history as a domesticated plant is not clear before Greek and Roman times, when it was a well-established garden vegetable. Theophrastus mentions three kinds of rhaphanos (ῥάφανος): a curly-leaved, a smooth-leaved, and a wild-type. He reports the antipathy of the cabbage and the grape vine, for the ancients believed cabbages grown near grapes would impart their flavour to the wine.

Through artificial selection for various phenotypic traits, the emergence of variations of the plant with drastic differences in appearance occurred over centuries. Preference for leaves, terminal buds, lateral buds, stems, and inflorescences resulted in selection of varieties of wild cabbage into the many forms known today. The wild plant (and its ancestors) originated in the eastern Mediterranean region of Europe. Estimated from Sanskrit writings 4,000 years ago, as well as Greek writings from the sixth century BC, plant cultivation may have occurred.

==== Impact of preference ====
The preference for eating the leaves led to the selection of plants with larger leaves being harvested and their seeds planted for the next growth. Around the fifth century BC, the formation of what is now known as kale had developed. Preference led to further artificial selection of kale plants with more tightly bunched leaves or terminal buds. Around the first century AD, the phenotype variation of B. oleracea known as cabbage emerged. Phenotype selection preferences in Germany resulted in a new variation from the kale cultivar. By selecting for wider stems, the variant plant known as kohlrabi emerged around the first century AD.

European preference emerged for eating immature buds, selecting for inflorescence. Early records in the 15th century AD indicate that early cauliflower and broccoli heading types were found throughout southern Italy and Sicily, although these types may not have been resolved into distinct cultivars until about 100 years later. Further selection in Belgium in lateral bud led to Brussels sprouts in the 18th century.

=== Cultivar groups ===
According to the Royal Botanic Gardens (Kew Species Profiles) the species has eight cultivar groups. Each cultivar group has many cultivars, like 'Lacinato' kale or 'Belstar' broccoli.

- Acephala: non-heading cultivars (kale, collards, ornamental cabbage, ornamental kale, flowering kale, tree cabbage).
- Alboglabra: Asian Cuisine cultivars (Chinese kale, Chinese broccoli, gai lan, kai lan).
- Botrytis: cultivars that form compact inflorescences (broccoli, cauliflower, broccoflower, calabrese broccoli, romanesco broccoli). (Note: Technically, broccoli is an inflorescence, and so it belongs to the Botrytis group. However, because its subspecies name is Brassica oleracea var. italica, some put it in the Italica group, including The North Carolina State University Cooperative Extension.)
- Capitata: cabbage and cabbage-like cultivars (cabbage, savoy cabbage, red cabbage).
- Gemmifera: bud-producing cultivars (sprouts, Brussels sprouts)
- Gongylodes: turnip-like cultivars (kohlrabi, knol-kohl)
- Italica: sprouts (purple sprouting broccoli, sprouting broccoli). Edible inflorescences not compacted into a single head.
- Tronchuda: low-growing annuals with spreading leaves (Portuguese cabbage, seakale cabbage (distinct from sea kale)).

A 2024 study compares 704 B. oleracea sequences and establishes a phylogenetic tree of cultivars. The authors find large-scale changes in gene expression and gene presence. Some genes are considered to be linked to certain traits such as arrested inflorescence (typical of cauliflower and broccoli).

Cultivar	Image	Cultivar group (Kew)	Name (variety, form)
Wild cabbage		N/A	Brassica oleracea var. oleracea
Cabbage		Capitata	Brassica oleracea var. capitata f. alba
Savoy cabbage		Capitata	Brassica oleracea var. capitata f. sabauda
Red cabbage		Capitata	Brassica oleracea var. capitata f. rubra
Pointed cabbage		Capitata	Brassica oleracea var. capitata f. acuta
Gai lan		Alboglabra	Brassica oleracea var. alboglabra
Collard greens		Acephala	Brassica oleracea var. viridis
Jersey cabbage		Acephala	Brassica oleracea var. longata
Ornamental kale		Acephala	Brassica oleracea var. acephala
Kale		Acephala	Brassica oleracea var. sabellica
Lacinato kale		Acephala	Brassica oleracea var. palmifolia
Perpetual kale		Acephala	Brassica oleracea var. ramosa
Kalette		Hybrid	Brassica oleracea var. viridis x gemmifera
Marrow cabbage		Acephala	Brassica oleracea var. medullosa
Tronchuda kale		Tronchuda	Brassica oleracea var. costata
Brussels sprout		Gemmifera	Brassica oleracea var. gemmifera
Kohlrabi		Gongylodes	Brassica oleracea var. gongylodes
Broccoli		Botrytis	Brassica oleracea var. italica
Cauliflower		Botrytis	Brassica oleracea var. botrytis
Caulini		Botrytis	Brassica oleracea var. botrytis
Romanesco		Botrytis	Brassica oleracea var. botrytis
Broccoli di Torbole		Botrytis	Brassica oleracea var. botrytis
Broccoflower		Hybrid (within Botrytis)	Brassica oleracea var. botrytis × italica
Broccolini		Hybrid	Brassica oleracea var. italica × alboglabra

== Uses ==
=== Human genetics in relation to taste ===
The TAS2R38 gene encodes a G protein-coupled receptor that functions as a taste receptor, mediated by ligands such as propylthiouracil (PTU) and phenylthiocarbamide that bind to the receptor and initiate signaling that confers various degrees of taste perception. Vegetables in the brassica family, such as collard greens, kale, broccoli, cabbage, and Brussels sprouts, contain glucosinolates and isothiocyanates, which resemble PTU, and therefore much of the perceived "bitterness" of these vegetables is mediated through TAS2R38. Bitter taste receptors in the TS2R family are also found in gut mucosal and pancreatic cells in humans and rodents. These receptors influence release of hormones involved in appetite regulation, such as peptide YY and glucagon-like peptide-1, and therefore may influence caloric intake and the development of obesity. Thus, bitter taste perception may affect dietary behaviors by influencing both taste preferences and metabolic hormonal regulation.

Three variants in the TAS2R38 gene – rs713598, rs1726866, and rs10246939 – are in high linkage disequilibrium in most populations and result in amino acid coding changes that lead to a range of bitter taste perception phenotypes. The PAV haplotype is dominant; therefore, individuals with at least one copy of the PAV allele perceive molecules in vegetables that resemble PTU as tasting bitter, and consequently may develop an aversion to bitter vegetables. In contrast, individuals with two AVI haplotypes are bitter non-tasters. PAV and AVI haplotypes are the most common, though other haplotypes exist that confer intermediate bitter taste sensitivity (AAI, AAV, AVV, and PVI). This taste aversion may apply to vegetables in general.
