= Lacinato kale =

Variety of kale

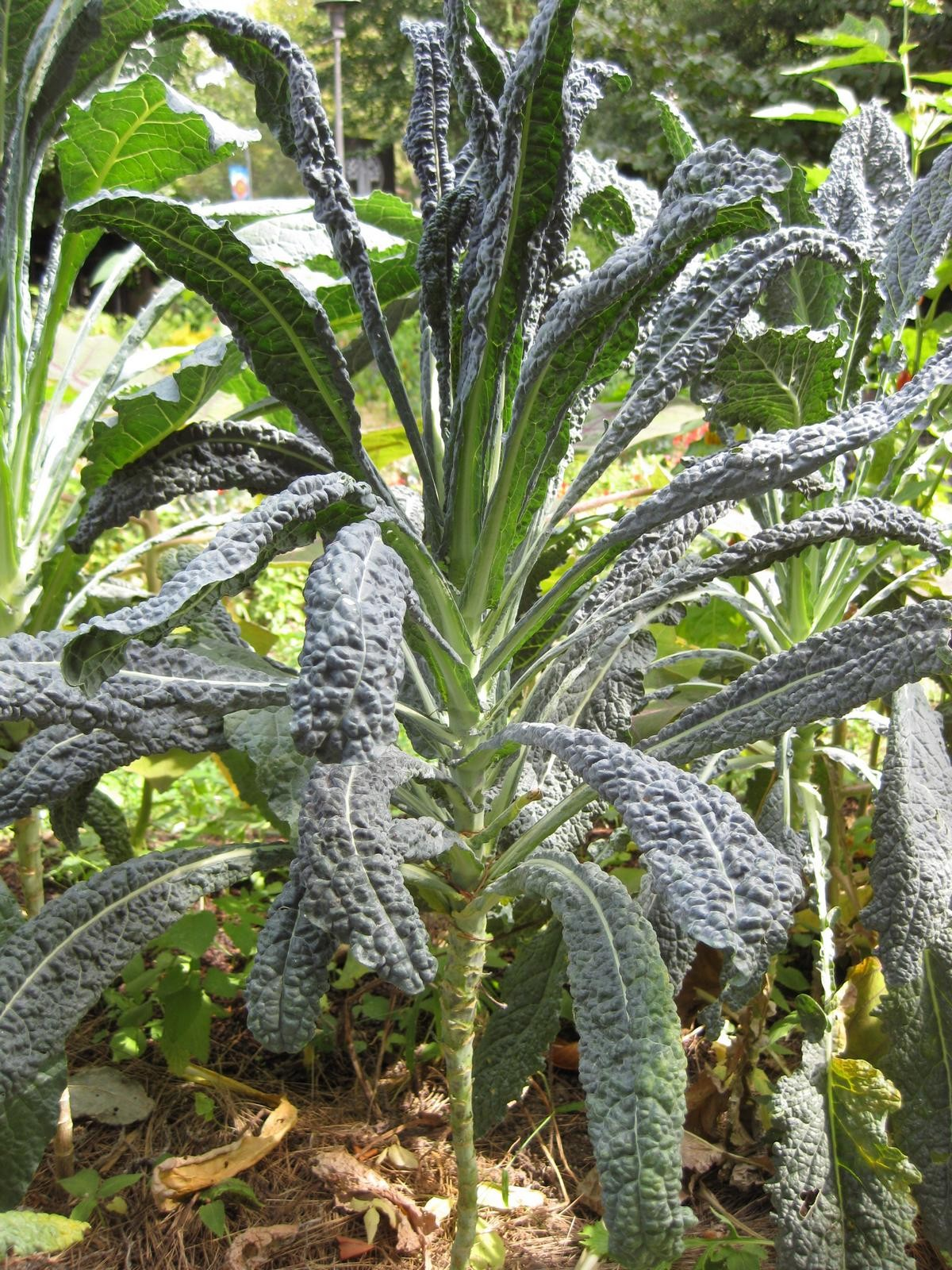
- Genus: Brassica
- Species: Brassica oleracea
- Cultivar group: Acephala group

Lacinato kale, (Note: UK: /ˌlæsɪˈnɑːtoʊ, ˌlæ(t)ʃɪ-/ LASS-in-AH-toh, LATCH-in-, LASH-in-, US: /ˌlɑːsɪ-/ LAH-sin-.) also known as Tuscan kale, Italian kale, dinosaur kale, kale, flat back kale, palm tree kale, black Tuscan palm, or, in Italian and often in English, cavolo nero, (Note: /ˌkævəloʊ ˈnɛəroʊ, ˌkɑːv-/ KA(H)V-ə-loh NAIR-oh, Italian: [ˈkaːvolo ˈneːro]; literally 'black cabbage'.) is a variety of kale from the Acephala group of cultivars Brassica oleracea grown for its edible leaves. Lacinato has a long tradition in Italian cuisine, especially that of Tuscany, where it has been grown for centuries, and it is one of the traditional ingredients of minestrone and ribollita.

== Description ==
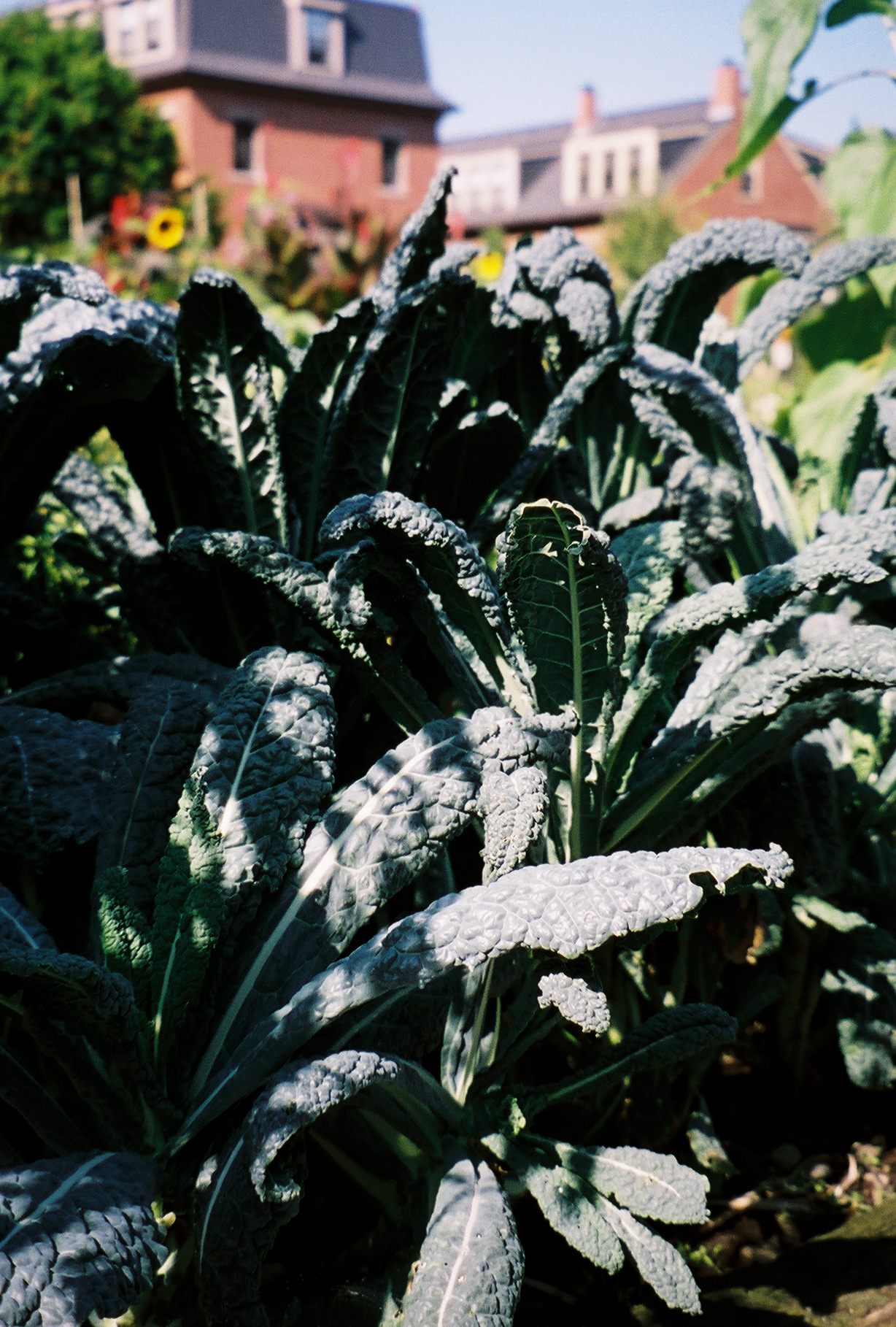
Tuscan kale (cavolo nero) growing in a SELROSLT garden

Lacinato kale grows 60 to 90 centimetres (2 to 3 ft) tall and has dark blue-green leaves with an "embossed texture"; its taste is described as "slightly sweeter and more delicate" than curly kale and "slightly bitter [and] earthy". The lacinato variety is sometimes called dinosaur kale because its bumpy leaves may resemble what dinosaur skin looked like, and perhaps because the unique appearance of the leaves is evocative of primordial flora. Because of its taste, it has been called "the darling of the culinary world".

== Preparation and dishes ==
Lacinato kale, like most other kale varieties, is usually blanched first, and then sautéed with other, flavourful ingredients; in Campanian cuisine, anchovies are often added. It is commonly used in pastas and soups, but can also be eaten raw, in a salad.

In Tuscan cuisine, lacinato kale is often used in ribollita (literally: "reboiled"), a thick, hearty soup made up of ingredients cooked for a meal the day before.

In Dutch, it is called (as in German) palmkool or palmkohl, referring to the palm-like shape with the leaves growing from the stem, especially after the bottom leaves are harvested. In Swedish and Finnish, it is known as svartkål or mustakaali, meaning 'black cabbage'.

Lacinato kale, known in Spain as Galician cabbage (berza gallega), is a key ingredient in Galician broth (caldo gallego). For this recipe, it is cooked with potatoes, white beans, and pork shoulder.

== Cultivation ==
Lacinato kale dates to the 18th century in Italy. This cultivar is popular among gardeners because of its colour and texture, and was amongst the plants Thomas Jefferson recorded in his 1777 garden at Monticello. The plant grows to a height of 60 centimetres (2 ft), with blistered leaves often over 30 cm (1 ft) in length and 5–10 cm (2–4 in) wide. The straplike leaves are typically harvested from the bottom of the stem, leaving the remainder of the plant resembling a palm tree.
