= Kohlrabi =

Biennial cultivar of wild cabbage

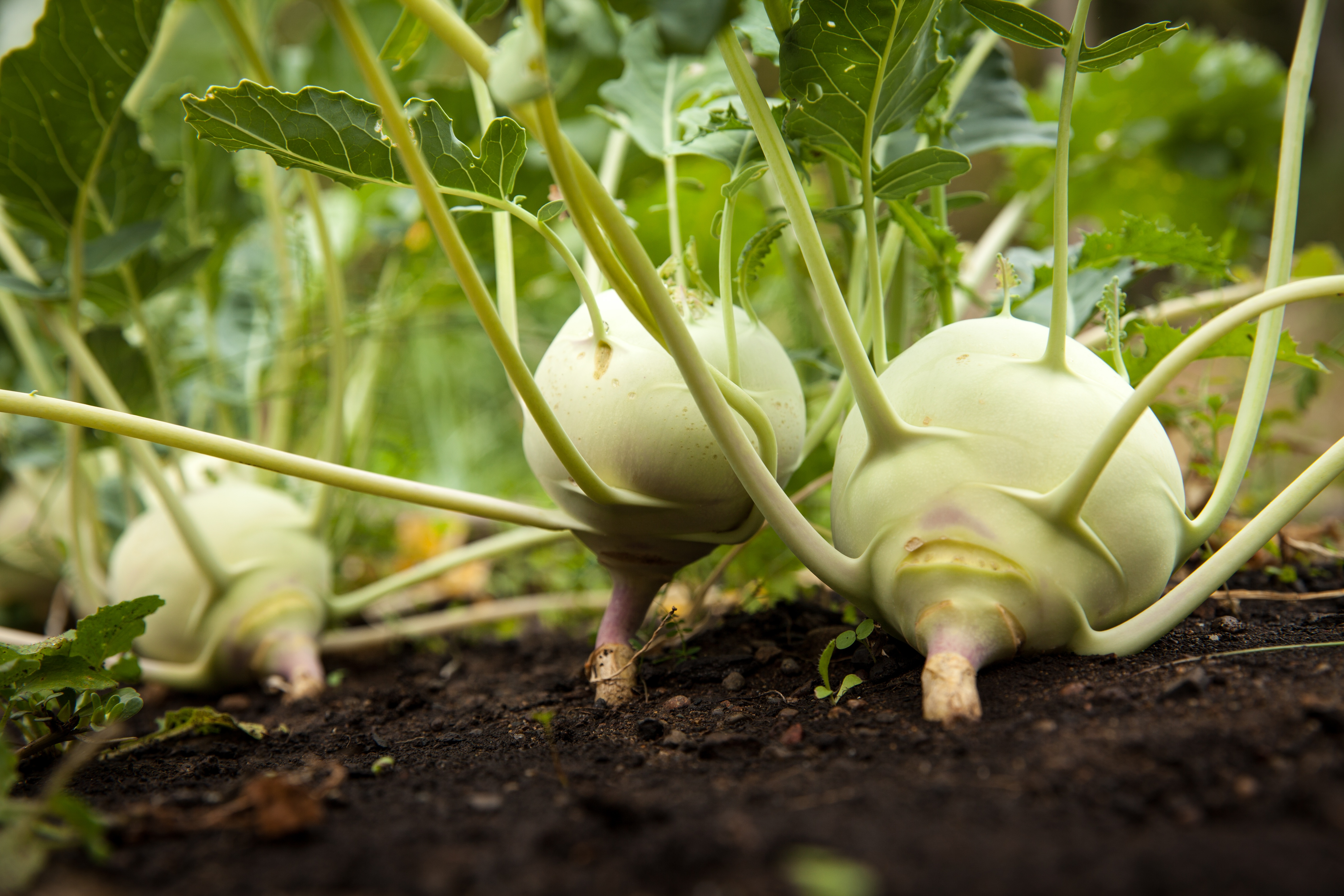
- Brassica oleracea var. gongylodes (kohlrabi)
- Species: Brassica oleracea
- Cultivar group: Gongylodes Group
- Cultivar group members: Many; see text.

Kohlrabi (German: [koːlˈʁaːbi]; pronounced /koʊlˈrɑːbi/ in English; scientific name Brassica oleracea Gongylodes Group), also called German turnip or turnip cabbage, is a biennial vegetable, a low, stout cultivar of wild cabbage. It is a cultivar of the same species as cabbage, broccoli, cauliflower, kale, Brussels sprouts, collard greens, Savoy cabbage, and gai lan.

It can be eaten raw or cooked. Edible preparations are made with both the stem and the leaves. Despite its common names, it is not the same species as turnip or rutabaga, although both are in the genus Brassica.

== Etymology ==
The name comes from the German Kohl ("cabbage") plus Rübe ~ Rabi (Swiss German variant) ("turnip"), because the swollen stem resembles the latter.

Its Group name Gongylodes (or lowercase and italicized gongylodes or gongyloides as a variety name) means "roundish" in Greek, from gongýlos (γογγύλος, 'round').

== History ==
The first European written record is by the botanist Mattioli in 1554 who wrote that it had "come lately into Italy". By the end of the 16th century, kohlrabi spread to North Europe and was being grown in Austria, Germany, England, Italy, Spain, Tripoli and parts of the eastern Mediterranean.

== Description ==
Kohlrabi was created by artificial selection for lateral meristem growth (a swollen, nearly spherical shape); its origin in nature is the same as that of cabbage, broccoli, cauliflower, kale, collard greens, and Brussels sprouts: they are all bred from, and are the same species as, the wild cabbage plant (Brassica oleracea).

The taste and texture of kohlrabi are similar to those of a broccoli stem or cabbage heart, but milder and sweeter, with a higher ratio of flesh to skin. The young stem in particular can be crisp and juicy.

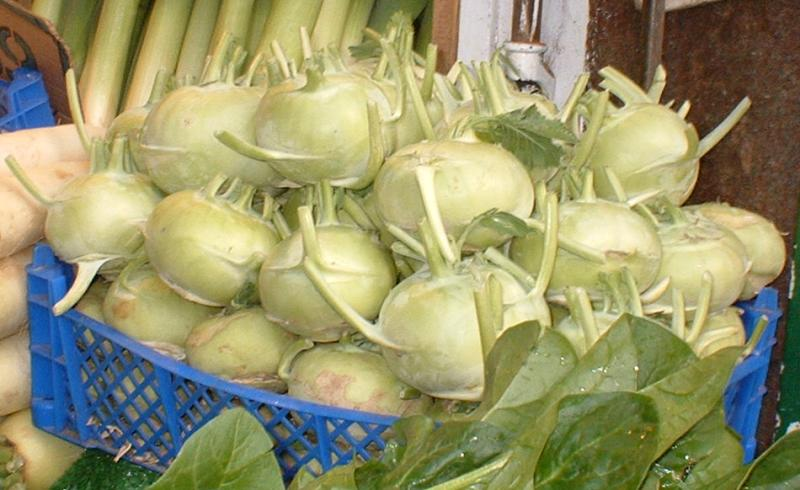
White kohlrabi

Except for the Gigante cultivar, spring-grown kohlrabi that are much over 5 cm (2 in) in size tend to be woody, as do full-grown kohlrabi much over perhaps 10 cm (4 in) in size; the Gigante cultivar can achieve great size while retaining good eating quality. The plant matures in 55–60 days after sowing and has good standing ability for up to 30 days after maturity. The approximate weight is 150 g (5.3 oz). It grows well in hydroponic systems, producing a large edible bulk without clogging the nutrient troughs.

There are several varieties commonly available, including 'White Vienna', 'Purple Vienna', 'Grand Duke', 'Gigante' (also known as "Superschmelz"), 'Purple Danube', and 'White Danube'. Colouration of the purple types is superficial: the edible parts are all pale yellow. The leafy greens can also be eaten. One commonly used variety grows without a swollen stem, having just leaves and a very thin stem, and is called Haakh. Haakh and Monj are popular Kashmiri dishes made using this vegetable. In the second year, the plant will bloom and develop seeds.

== Nutrition ==
Kohlrabi, raw
Nutritional value per 100 g (3.5 oz)
- Energy: 113 kJ (27 kcal)
- Carbohydrates: 6.2 g
- Sugars: 2.6 g
- Dietary fiber: 3.6 g
- Fat: 0.1 g
- Protein: 1.7 g
Vitamins and minerals
Vitamins	Quantity %DV^{†}
Vitamin A equiv.	0% 2 μg
Thiamine (B1)	4% 0.05 mg
Riboflavin (B2)	2% 0.02 mg
Niacin (B3)	3% 0.4 mg
Pantothenic acid (B5)	3% 0.165 mg
Vitamin B6	9% 0.15 mg
Folate (B9)	4% 16 μg
Vitamin B12	0% 0 μg
Vitamin C	69% 62 mg
Vitamin D	0% 0 μg
Vitamin E	3% 0.48 mg
Vitamin K	0% 0.1 μg
Minerals	Quantity %DV^{†}
Calcium	2% 24 mg
Copper	14% 0.129 mg
Iron	2% 0.4 mg
Magnesium	5% 19 mg
Manganese	6% 0.139 mg
Phosphorus	4% 46 mg
Potassium	12% 350 mg
Selenium	1% 0.7 μg
Sodium	1% 20 mg
Zinc	0% 0.03 mg
- Other constituents: Quantity
- Water: 91.00 g
- Link to USDA Database entry
- ^{†}Percentages estimated using US recommendations for adults, except for potassium, which is estimated based on expert recommendation from the National Academies.

Raw kohlrabi is 91% water, 6% carbohydrates, 2% protein, and contains negligible fat (table). In a 100 g (3.5 oz) reference amount, raw kohlrabi supplies 27 calories, and is a rich source (20% or more of the Daily Value, DV) of vitamin C (65% DV) and a moderate source (10–19% DV) of copper and potassium, with no other micronutrients in significant amounts (table).

== Preparation and use ==
Kohlrabi stems (the enlarged vegetal part) are surrounded by two distinct fibrous layers that do not soften appreciably when cooked. These layers are generally peeled away prior to cooking or serving raw, with the result that the stems often provide a smaller amount of food than one might assume from their intact appearance.

Although all parts of kohlrabi are edible, the bulbous stem is most frequently used, typically raw in salad or slaws. It has a texture similar to that of a broccoli stem, but with a flavor that is sweeter and less vegetal. It is also more crunchy and crisp than a raw broccoli stem.

Kohlrabi leaves are edible and can be used similarly to collard greens and kale, but take longer to cook.

Kohlrabi is an important part of Kashmiri cuisine, where it is called Mŏnji. It is one of the most commonly cooked vegetables, along with collard greens (haakh). It is prepared with its leaves and served with a light soup and eaten with rice.

In Cyprus, it is popularly sprinkled with salt and lemon and served as an appetizer.

Kohlrabi is a common ingredient in Vietnamese cuisine. It can also be found in the dish nem rán, stir fry and canh. Raw kohlrabi is usually sliced thinly for nộm or nước chấm.

Some varieties are grown as feed for cattle.

== Gallery ==
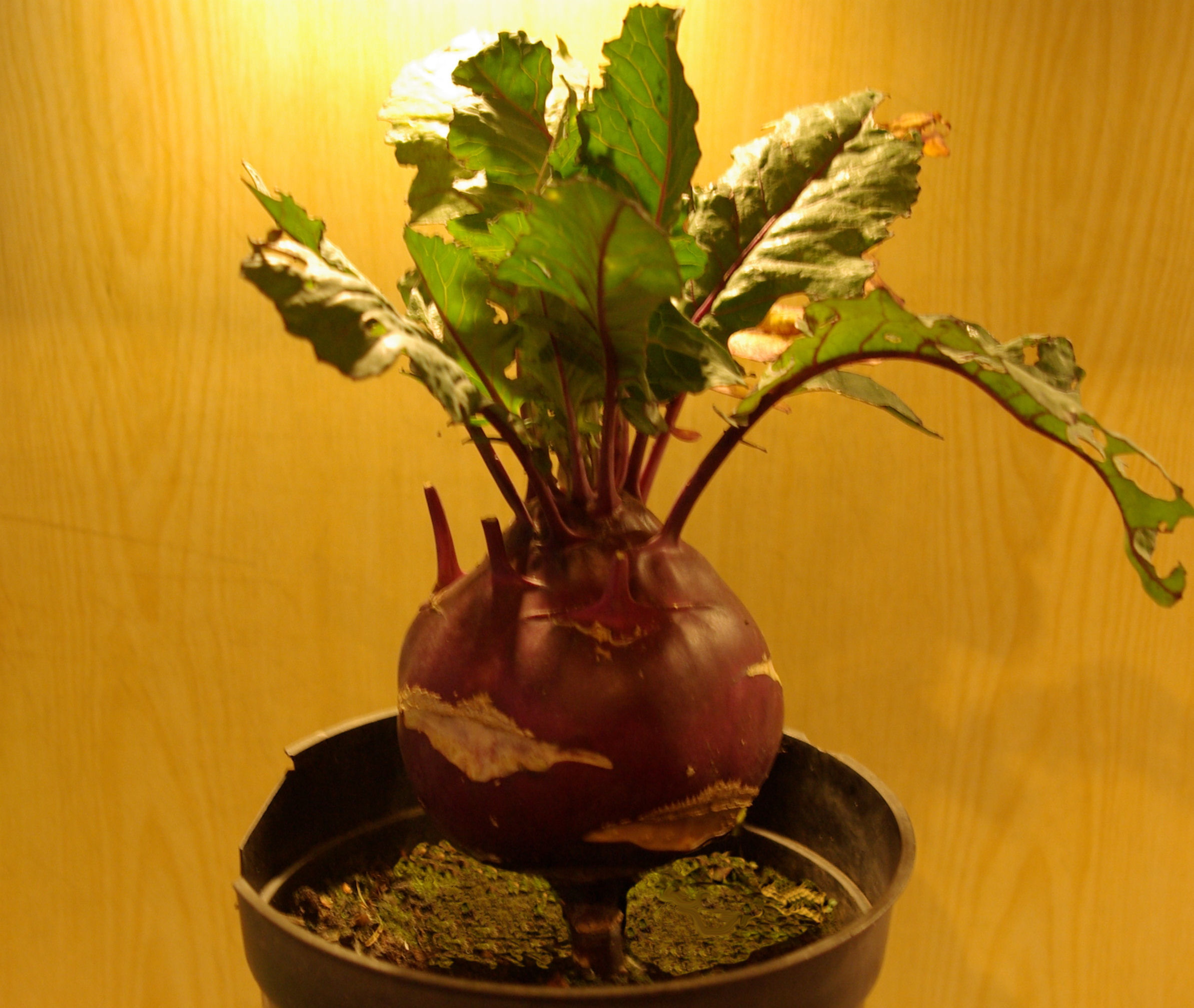
Kohlrabi grown in a flower pot

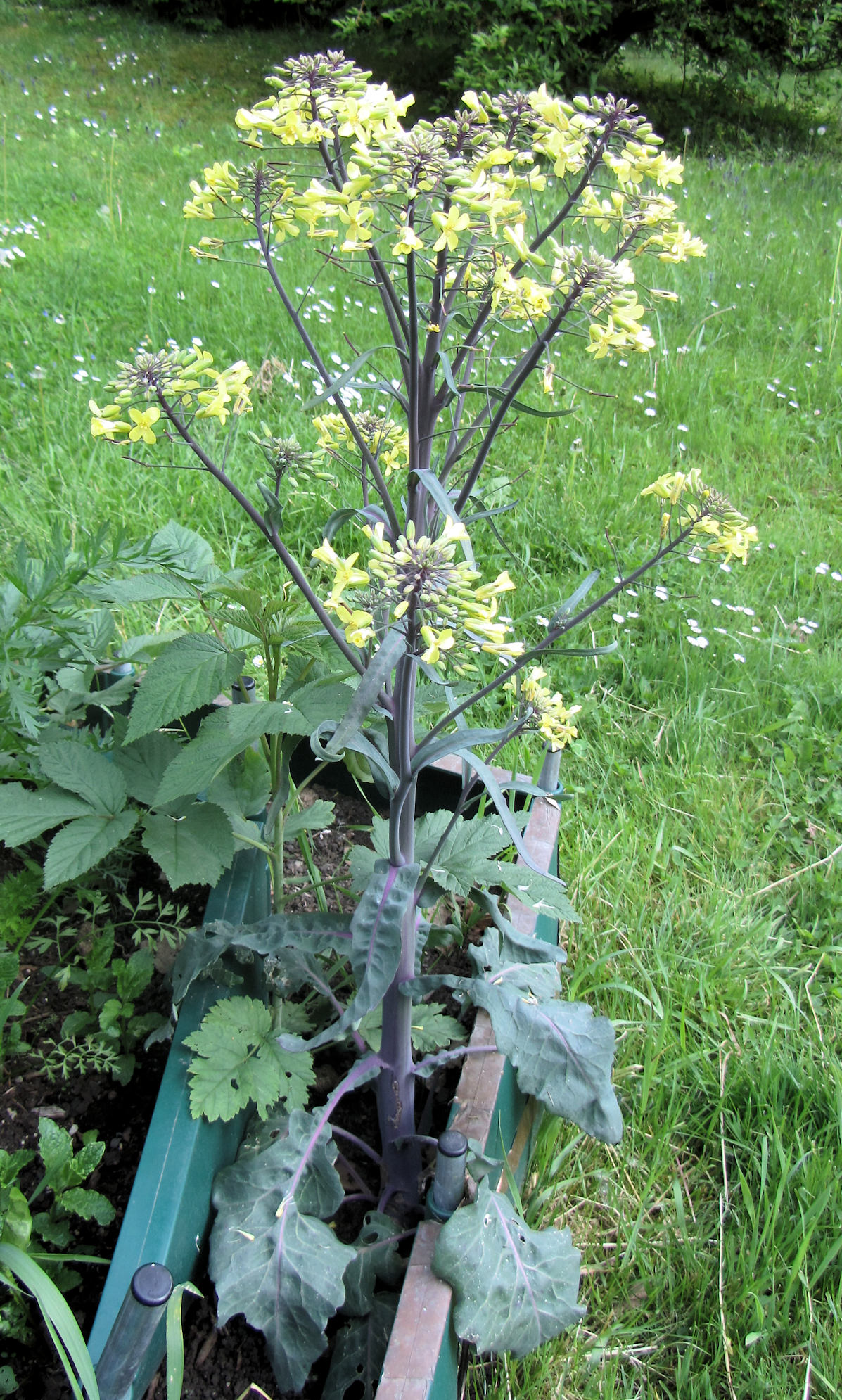
Blooming plant in the 2nd year
