= Romanesco broccoli =

Vegetable, member of the cabbage family

Romanesco
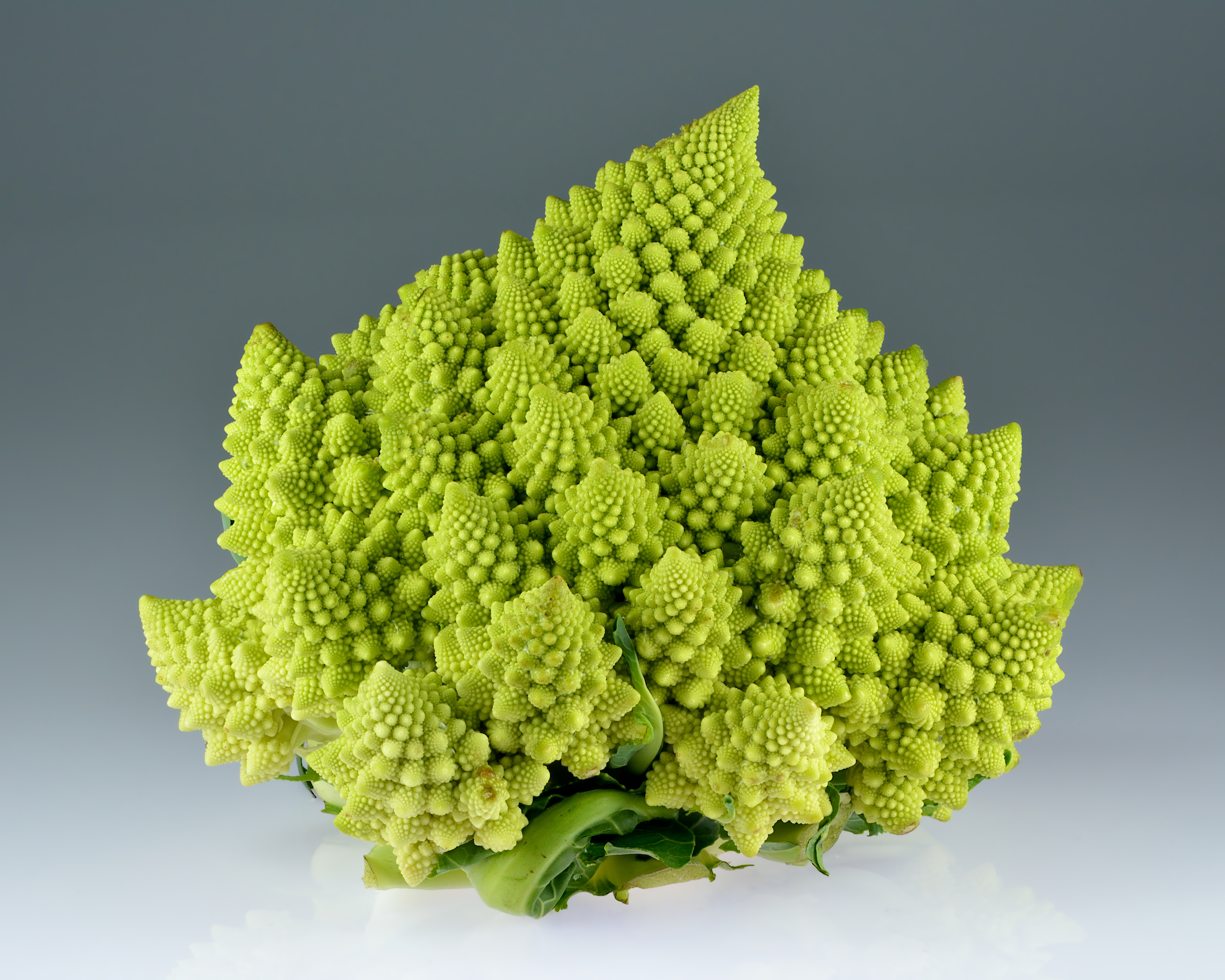
- Romanesco, showing its self-similar form
- Species: Brassica oleracea
- Cultivar group: Botrytis cultivar group

Romanesco broccoli (also known as broccolo romanesco, romanesque cauliflower, or simply romanesco) is a cultivar of the cauliflower (Brassica oleracea var. botrytis). It is an edible flower bud of the species Brassica oleracea, which also includes regular cauliflower, and broccoli. It is chartreuse in color and has a striking form that naturally approximates a fractal. Romanesco has a nutty flavor and a firmer texture than white cauliflower or broccoli when cooked. As its name suggests, it is believed to originate from the region of Rome at least prior to the early 1800's. It is one of two cauliflower varieties commonly referred to as "broccoflower" because they are green not white.

== Description ==
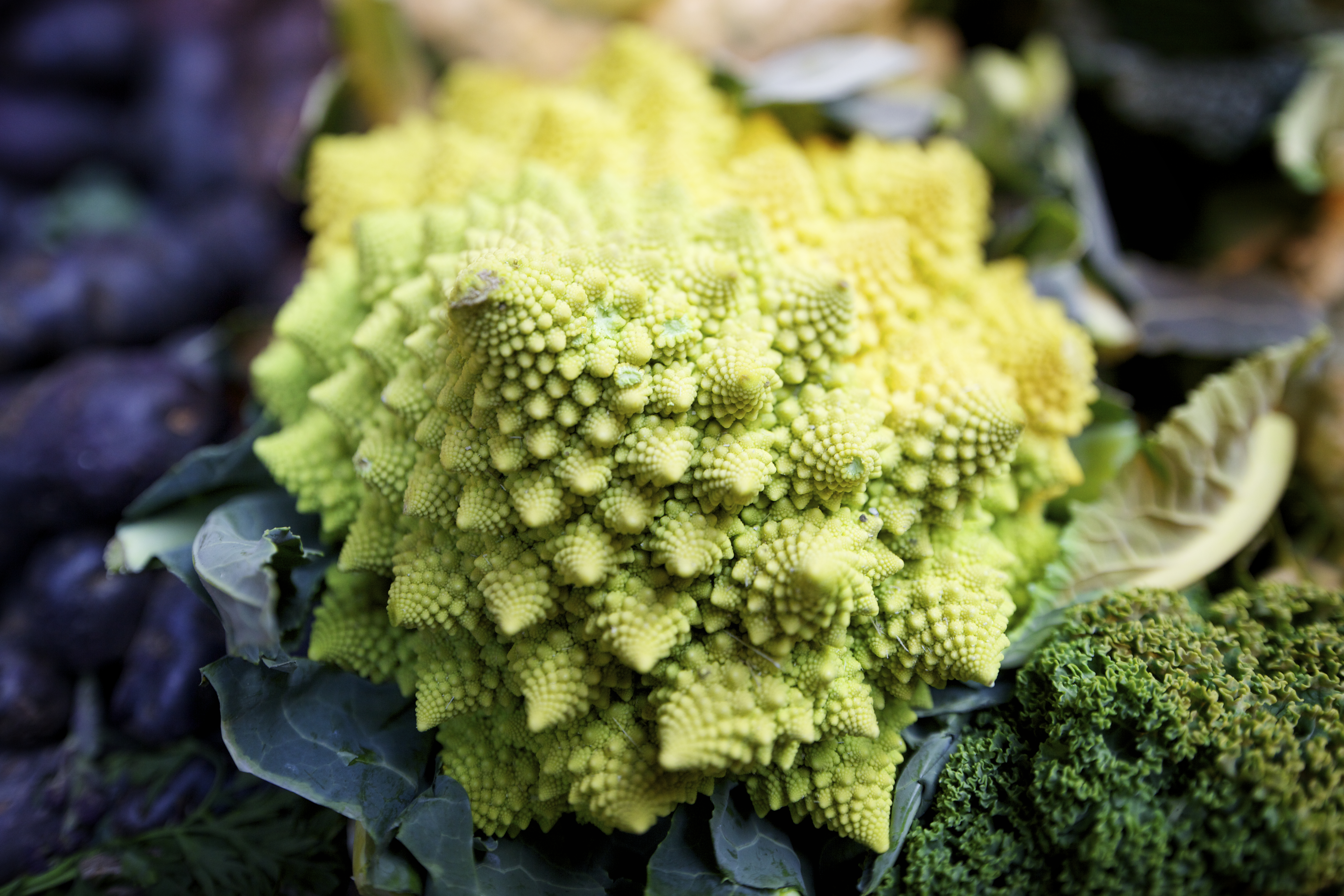
The Romanesco superficially resembles a cauliflower, but it has a visually striking fractal form.

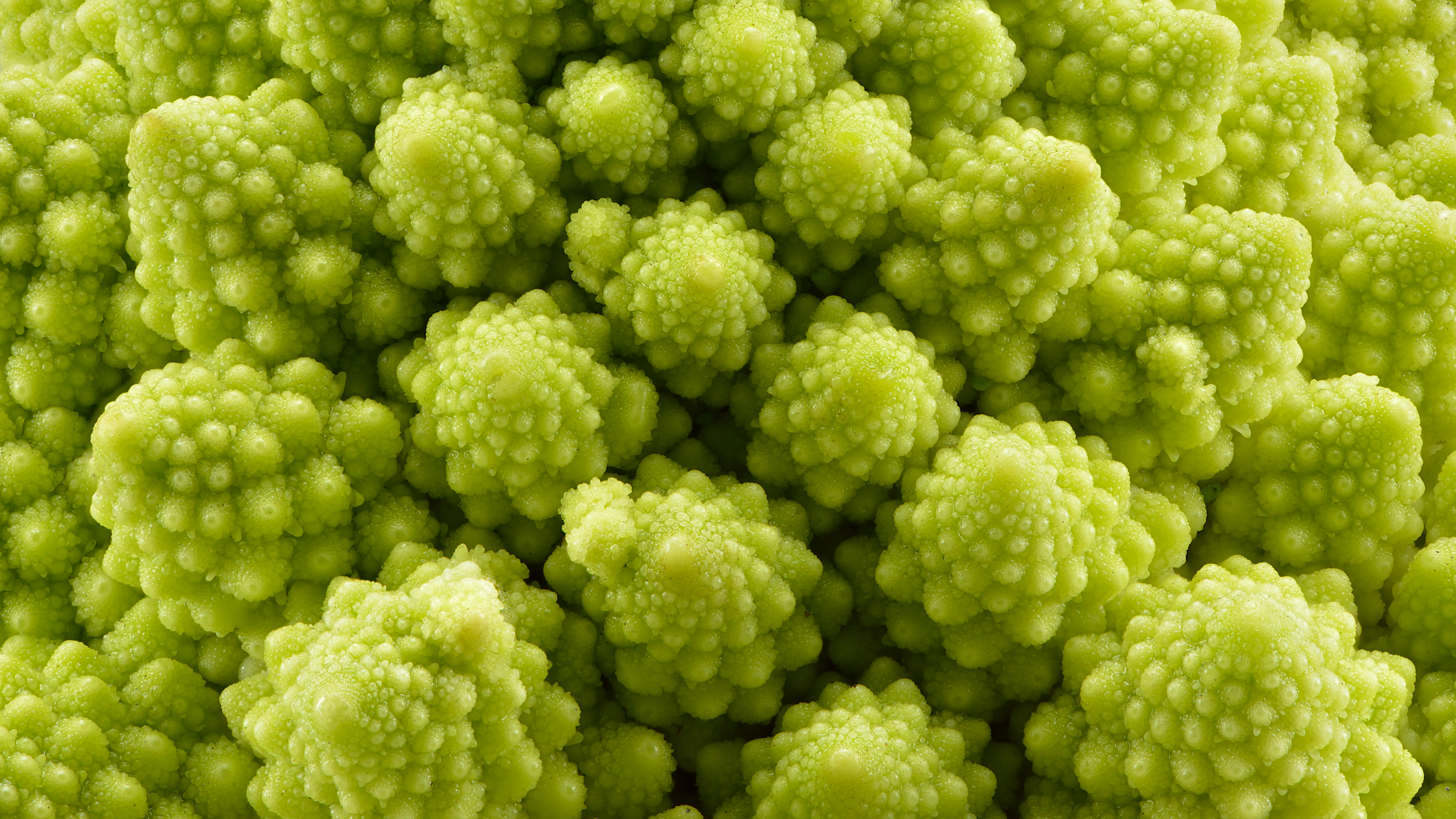
Romanesco broccoli texture

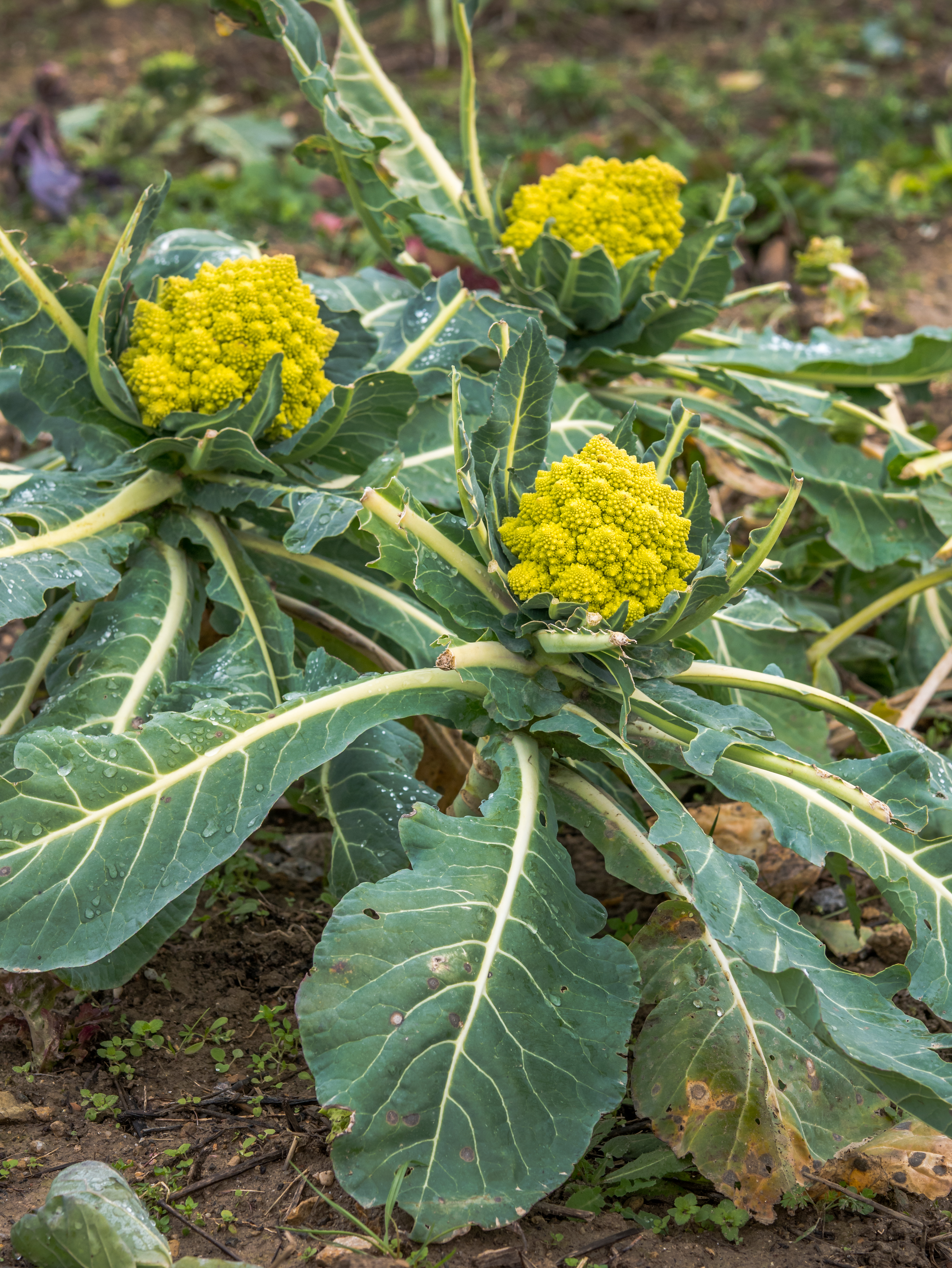
Romanesco broccoli in a field

Romanesco superficially resembles a cauliflower, but it is chartreuse in color, with a striking natural fractal form. Nutritionally, romanesco is rich in vitamin C, vitamin K, dietary fiber, and carotenoids.

=== Fractal structure ===
The inflorescence (the bud) is self-similar in character, with the branched meristems making up a logarithmic spiral, giving a form approximating a natural fractal; each bud is composed of a series of smaller buds, all arranged in yet another logarithmic spiral. This self-similar pattern continues at smaller levels. The pattern is only an approximate fractal since the pattern eventually terminates when the feature size becomes sufficiently small. The number of spirals on the head of Romanesco broccoli is a Fibonacci number.

The causes of its differences in appearance from the normal cauliflower and broccoli have been modeled as an extension of the preinfloresence stage of bud growth. A 2021 paper ascribed this phenomenon to perturbations of floral gene networks that causes the development of meristems into flowers to fail, but instead to repeat itself in a self-similar way.

== See also ==
- Phyllotaxis
