= Kalette =

Edible cultivar, cross between kale and Brussels sprouts

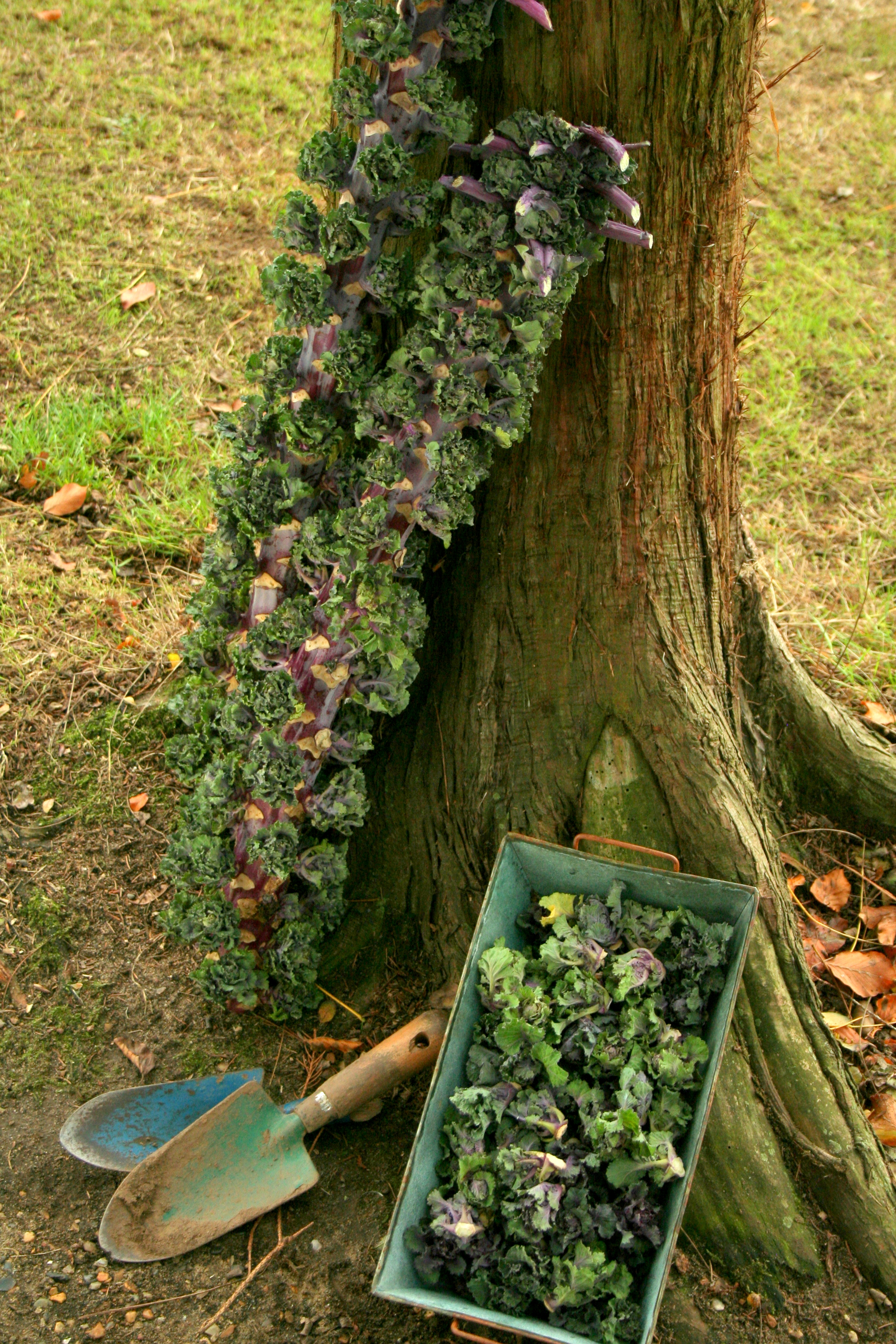
- Kalettes on the stem and also picked - photo by Tozer Seeds
- Genus: Brassica
- Species: Brassica oleracea
- Hybrid parentage: Kale/Brussels sprouts
- Marketing names: Lollipops
- Breeder: Tozer Seeds
- Origin: England

Kalettes (formerly known as Flower Sprouts, Petit Posy, Brukale, or Brusselkale) is a hybrid plant brand name for kale sprouts. Bred using breeding techniques, they are a cross between kale and Brussels sprouts. The plant can be eaten raw or cooked. "Kalette" is a brand name for the vegetable "kale sprouts," which were introduced to the U.K. market in 2010 under the name Flower Sprouts.

Its flower-like florets are open to about 2 inches (51 mm) in diameter. Three bicolored varieties are planted for different harvest times: for early-season, mid-season, and late-season harvests. Decorative florets are optimized when planted in fertile soils with a pH above 6.5-7.5. In dry weather, the plants require careful fertilization and regular irrigation.

The hybrids were debuted by Tozer Seeds in England. They were initially introduced to the United States under the brand name "Lollipops" which is currently in use. Several U.S. vendors, such as Johnny's Selected Seeds, also distribute kalette seeds.
