= Cauliflower =

Vegetable in the species Brassica oleracea

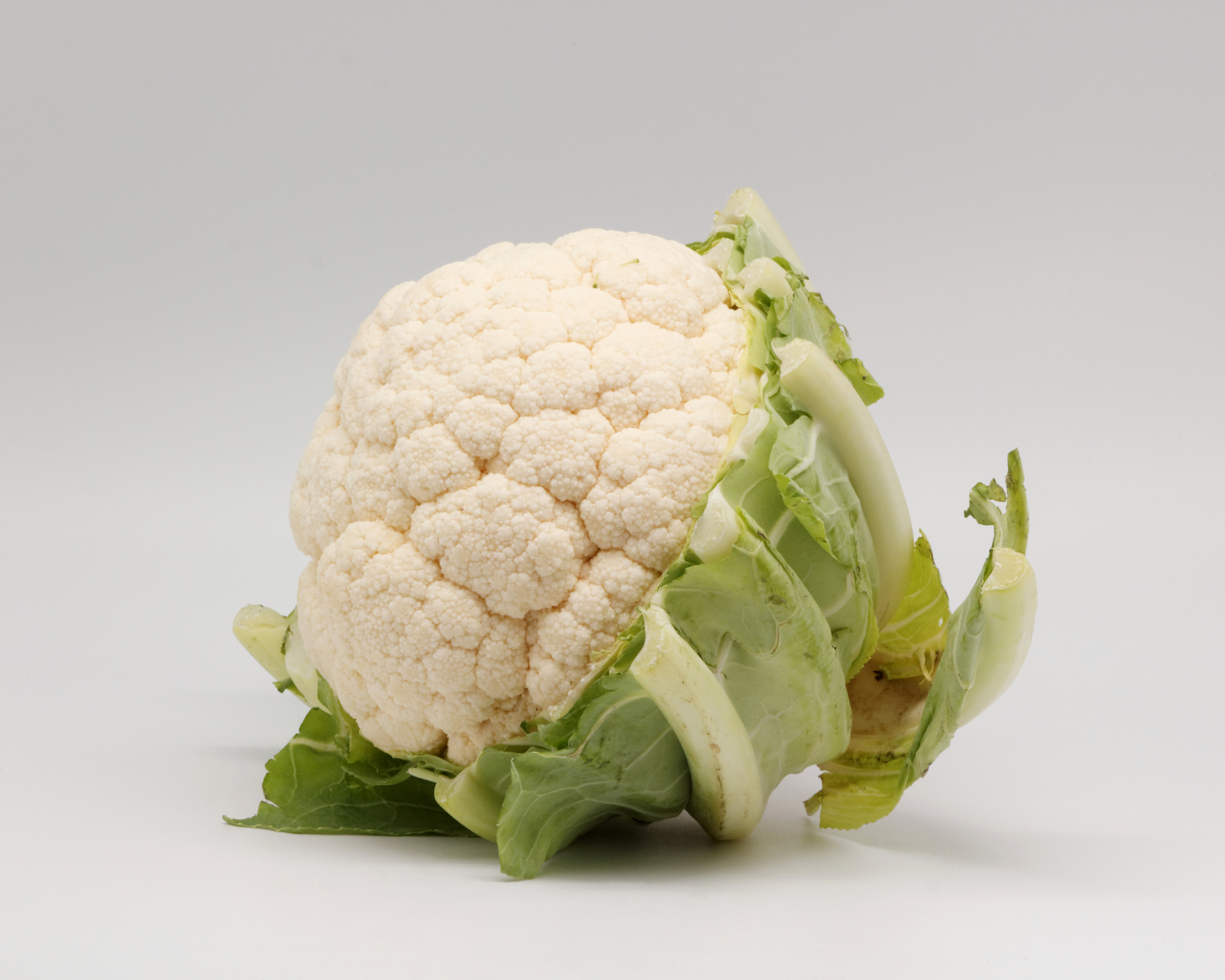
- Cauliflower, cultivar unknown
- Species: Brassica oleracea
- Cultivar group: Botrytis Group
- Origin: Northeast Mediterranean
- Cultivar group members: Many; see text.

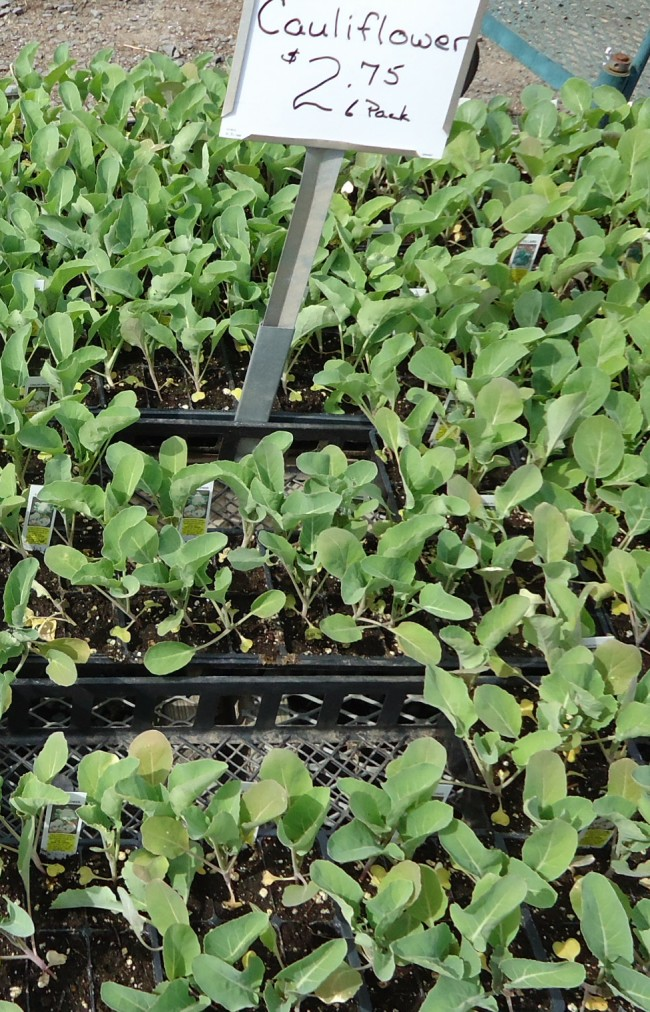
Cauliflower plants growing in a nursery

Cauliflower (Brassica oleracea var. botrytis) is a vegetable belonging to the species Brassica oleracea in the family Brassicaceae (the mustard or cabbage family). It is one of several cultivated forms of the species, along with cabbage, broccoli, Brussels sprouts, kale, kohlrabi, and others. The edible portion of the plant is its dense head of undeveloped flower buds known as the "curd". The head is usually white but may also be green, orange, or purple. Several cultivars exist, including the Romanesco variety, whose spiral curds grow in fractal patterns.

Cauliflower was domesticated in the Mediterranean region during antiquity, most likely by selective breeding of wild cabbage. It is grown worldwide as a cool-season crop and is widely used in cooking, where it may be eaten raw, steamed, roasted, or incorporated into other dishes. World cauliflower production (combined with broccoli) in 2024 was 27 million tonnes, led by China and India with 73% of the total.

== Description ==
There are four major groups of cauliflower.

1. Italian: This specimen is diverse in appearance, biennial, and annual in type. This group includes white, Romanesco, and various brown, green, purple, and yellow cultivars. This type is the ancestral form from which the others were derived.
2. Northern European annuals: These are used in Europe and North America for summer and fall harvests. They were developed in Germany in the 18th century and include the old cultivars Erfurt and Snowball.
3. Northwest biennial: Used in Europe for winter and early spring harvest, developed in France in the 19th century and includes the old cultivars Angers and Roscoff.
4. Asian: A tropical cauliflower used in China and India, it was developed in India during the 19th century from the now-abandoned Cornish type and includes old varieties Early Benaras and Early Patna.

=== Domestication ===
Cauliflowers are an "arrested inflorescence" subspecies of B. oleracea that arose around 2,500 years ago. Genomic analysis finds initially evolved from broccoli with three MADS-box genes, playing roles in its curd formation. Nine loci and candidate genes are linked with morphological and biological characters.

=== Varieties ===
There are hundreds of historic and current commercial varieties used around the world. A comprehensive list of about 80 North American varieties is maintained at North Carolina State University.

=== Colors ===
- White cauliflower is the most common color of cauliflower, having a contrasting white head (also called "curd", having a similar appearance to cheese curd), surrounded by green leaves.
- Orange cauliflower contains beta-carotene as the orange pigment, a provitamin A compound. This orange trait originated from a natural mutant found in a cauliflower field in Canada. Cultivars include 'Cheddar' and 'Orange Bouquet'.
- Green cauliflower in the B. oleracea Botrytis Group is sometimes called broccoflower. It is available in the normal curd (head) shape and with a fractal spiral curd called Romanesco broccoli. Both have been commercially available in the U.S. and Europe since the early 1990s. Green-headed varieties include 'Alverda, 'Green Goddess', and 'Vorda'. Romanesco varieties include 'Minaret' and 'Veronica'.
- The purple color is caused by the presence of anthocyanins, water-soluble pigments that are found in many other plants and plant-based products, such as red cabbage and red wine. Varieties include 'Graffiti' and 'Purple Cape'.
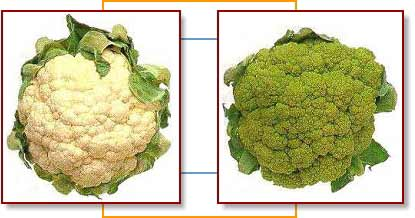
White and green cauliflower

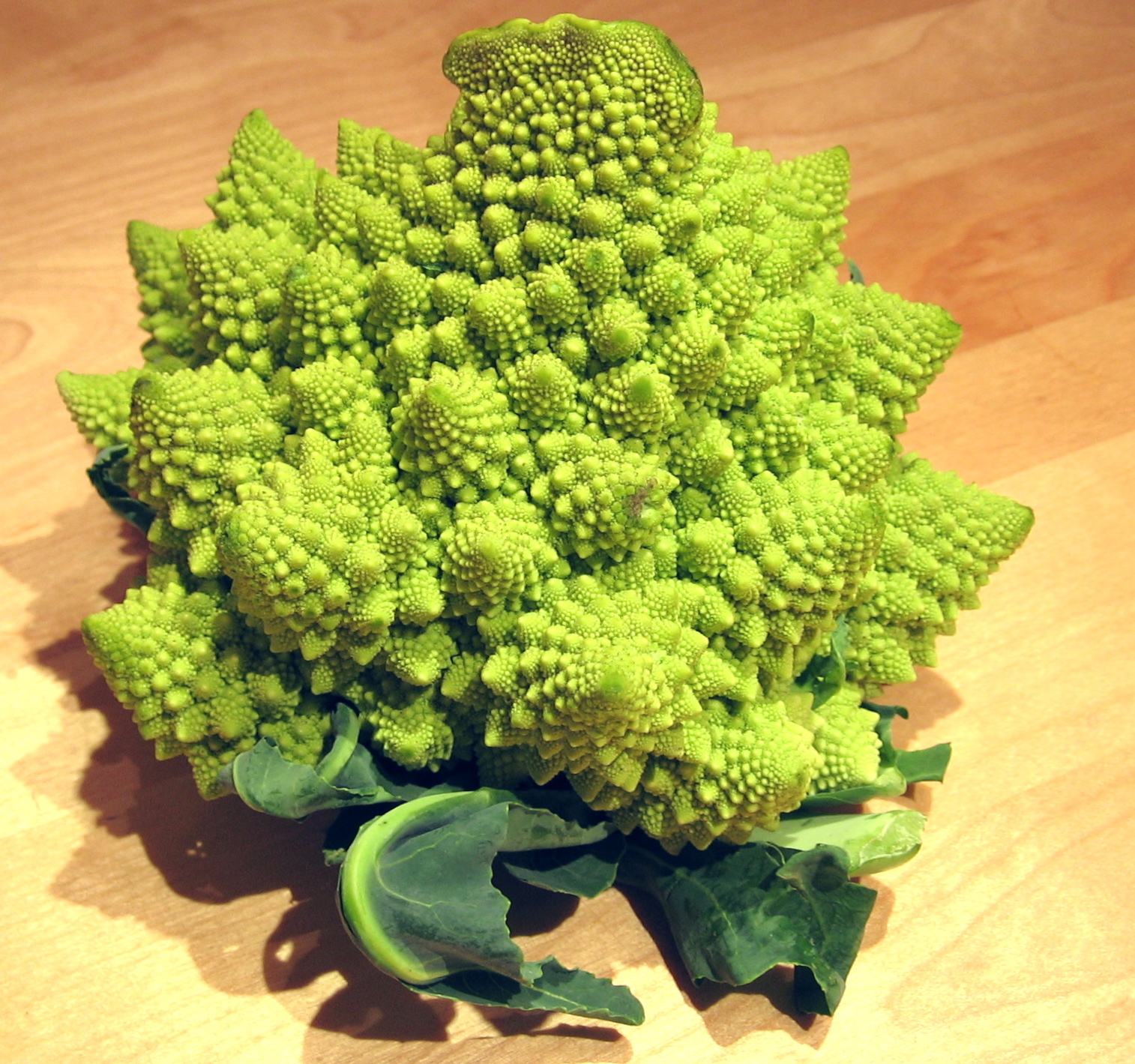
Green Romanesco cauliflower

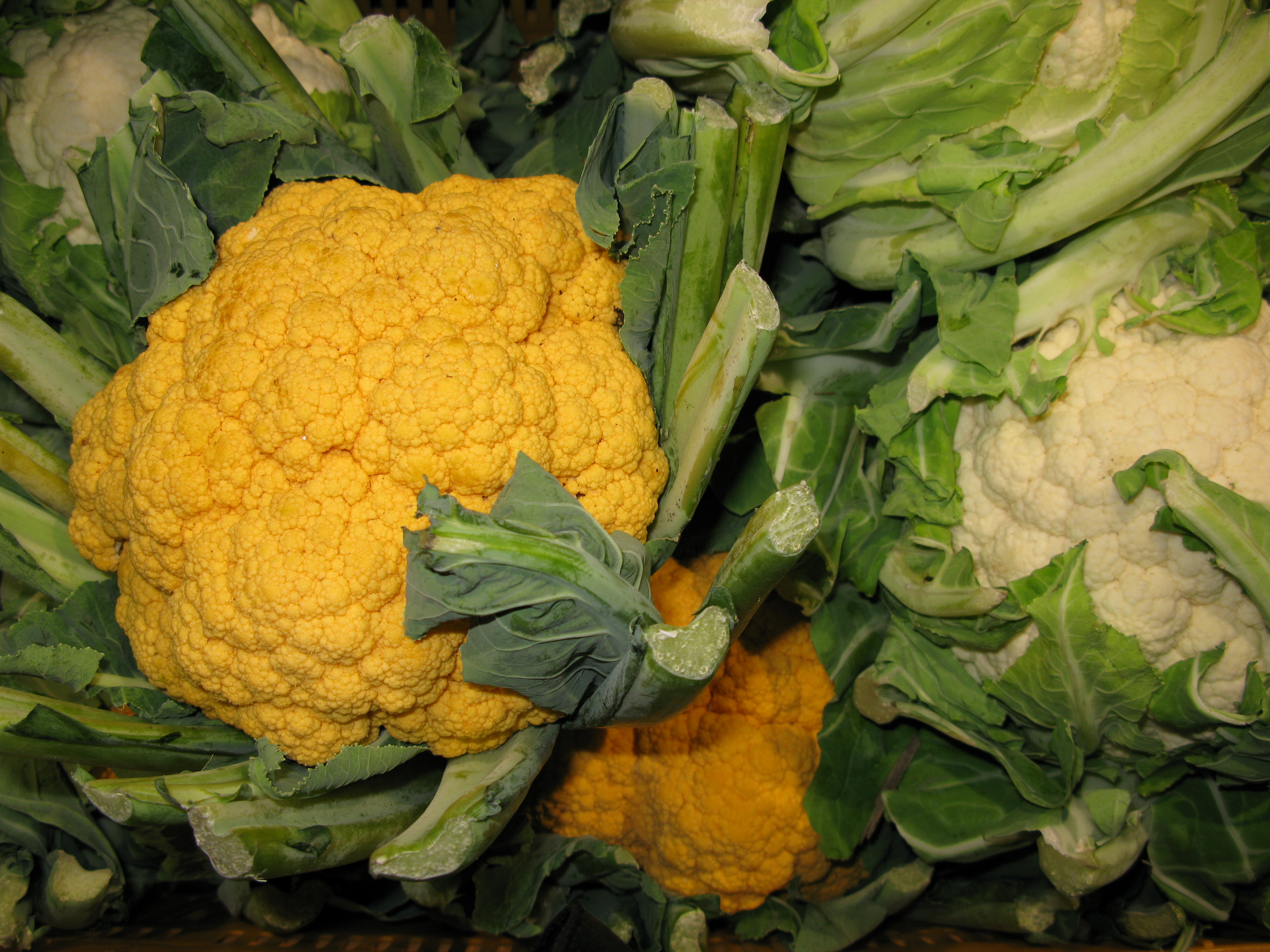
Orange cauliflower

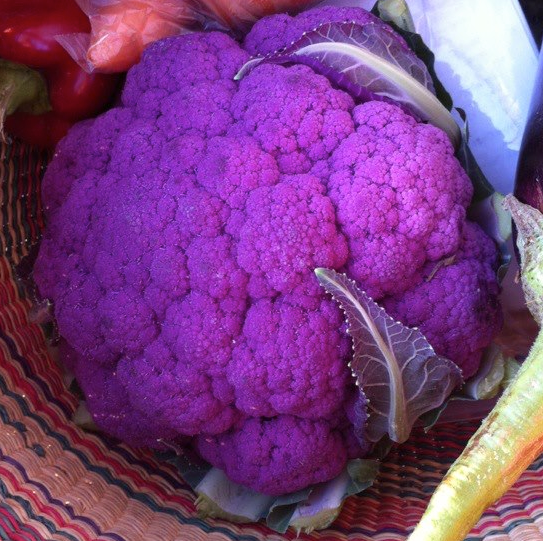
Purple cauliflower

=== Phytochemicals ===
Cauliflower contains several non-nutrient phytochemicals common in the cabbage family that are under preliminary research for their potential properties, including isothiocyanates and glucosinolates. Boiling reduces the levels of cauliflower glucosinolates, while other cooking methods, such as steaming, microwaving, and stir frying, have no significant effect on glucosinolate levels.

== Etymology ==
The word "cauliflower" derives from the Italian cavolfiore, meaning "cabbage flower". The ultimate origin of the name is from the Latin words caulis (cabbage) and flōs (flower).

== Nutrition ==
Cauliflower, raw
Nutritional value per 100 g (3.5 oz)
- Energy: 25 kcal (100 kJ)
- Carbohydrates: 5 g
- Sugars: 1.9 g
- Dietary fiber: 2 g
- Fat: 0.3 g
- Protein: 1.9 g
Vitamins and minerals
Vitamins	Quantity %DV^{†}
Thiamine (B1)	4% 0.05 mg
Riboflavin (B2)	5% 0.06 mg
Niacin (B3)	3% 0.507 mg
Pantothenic acid (B5)	13% 0.667 mg
Vitamin B6	11% 0.184 mg
Folate (B9)	14% 57 μg
Vitamin C	54% 48.2 mg
Vitamin E	1% 0.08 mg
Vitamin K	13% 15.5 μg
Minerals	Quantity %DV^{†}
Calcium	2% 22 mg
Iron	2% 0.42 mg
Magnesium	4% 15 mg
Manganese	7% 0.155 mg
Phosphorus	4% 44 mg
Potassium	10% 299 mg
Sodium	1% 30 mg
Zinc	2% 0.27 mg
- Other constituents: Quantity
- Water: 92 g
- Link to USDA Database entry
- ^{†}Percentages estimated using US recommendations for adults, except for potassium, which is estimated based on expert recommendation from the National Academies.

Raw cauliflower is 92% water, 5% carbohydrates, 2% protein, and contains negligible fat (table). In a reference amount of 100 grams (3.5 oz), raw cauliflower provides 25 calories of food energy, and has a high content (20% or more of the Daily Value, DV) of vitamin C (54% DV) and moderate levels of several B vitamins, vitamin K, and potassium (10–14% DV; table). Contents of other micronutrients are low (below 5% DV).

== Cultivation ==
=== History ===
Cauliflower is the result of selective breeding and likely arose in the Mediterranean region, possibly from broccoli.

Pliny the Elder included cyma among cultivated plants he described in Natural History: "Ex omnibus brassicae generibus suavissima est cyma" ("Of all the varieties of cabbage the most pleasant-tasted is cyma"). Pliny's description likely refers to the flowering heads of an earlier cultivated variety of Brassica oleracea.

In the Middle Ages, early forms of cauliflower were associated with the island of Cyprus, with the 12th- and 13th-century Arab botanists Ibn al-'Awwam and Ibn al-Baitar claiming its origin to be Cyprus. This association continued into Western Europe, where cauliflowers were sometimes known as Cyprus colewort, and there was extensive trade in Western Europe in cauliflower seeds from Cyprus, under the French Lusignan rulers of the island, until well into the 16th century.

It is thought to have been introduced into Italy from Cyprus or the east coast of the Mediterranean around 1490 and then spread to other European countries in the following centuries.

François Pierre La Varenne employed chouxfleurs in Le cuisinier françois. They were introduced to France from Genoa in the 16th century and are featured in Olivier de Serres' Théâtre de l'agriculture (1600), as cauli-fiori "as the Italians call it, which are still rather rare in France; they hold an honorable place in the garden because of their delicacy", but they did not commonly appear on grand tables until the time of Louis XIV. It was introduced to India in 1822 by the British.

=== Horticulture ===
Cauliflower is relatively difficult to grow compared with cabbage, with common problems such as an underdeveloped head and poor curd quality.

==== Climate ====
A cauliflower harvest in Kullu, Himachal Pradesh, India.

Because the weather is a limiting factor for producing cauliflower, the plant grows best in moderate daytime temperatures 21–29 °C (70–85 °F), with plentiful sun and moist soil conditions high in organic matter and sandy soils. The earliest maturity possible for cauliflower is 7 to 12 weeks from transplanting. In the northern hemisphere planting in July may enable harvesting before autumn frost.

Long periods of sun exposure in hot summer weather may cause cauliflower heads to discolor with a red-purple hue.

==== Seeding and transplanting ====
Transplantable cauliflowers can be produced in containers such as flats, hotbeds, or fields. In soil that is loose, well-drained, and fertile, field seedlings are shallow-planted 1 cm (1/2 in) and thinned by ample space – about 12 plants per 30 cm (1 ft). Ideal growing temperatures are about 18 °C (65 °F) when seedlings are 25 to 35 days old. Applications of fertilizer to developing seedlings begin when leaves appear, usually with a starter solution weekly.

Transplanting to the field normally begins in late spring and may continue until mid-summer. Row spacing is about 38–46 cm (15–18 in). Rapid vegetative growth after transplanting may benefit from such procedures as avoiding spring frosts, using starter solutions high in phosphorus, irrigating weekly, and applying fertilizer.

==== Disorders, pests, and diseases ====
The most important disorders affecting cauliflower quality are a hollow stem, stunted head growth or buttoning, ricing, browning, and leaf-tip burn. Among major pests affecting cauliflower are aphids, root maggots, cutworms, moths, flea beetles, and the seedcorn maggot, Delia platura. The plant is susceptible to black rot, black leg, club root, black leaf spot, and downy mildew.

==== Harvesting ====
When cauliflower is mature, heads appear clear white, compact, and 15–20 cm (6–8 in) in diameter, and should be cooled shortly after harvest. Forced air cooling to remove heat from the field during hot weather may be needed for optimal preservation. Short-term storage is possible using cool, high-humidity storage conditions.

==== Pollination ====
Many species of blowflies, including Calliphora vomitoria, are known pollinators of cauliflower.

=== Production ===
Cauliflower production 2024, millions of tonnes
China	9.8
India	9.8
United States	1.0
Mexico	0.7
Spain	0.7
World	26.9
Source: FAOSTAT of the United Nations

In 2024, world production of cauliflower (combined for production reports with broccoli) was 27 million tonnes, led by China and India, which together had 73% of the total (table). Secondary producers were the United States, Mexico and Spain.

Cauliflower and broccoli yield

Production of cauliflowers and broccoli

== Culinary ==
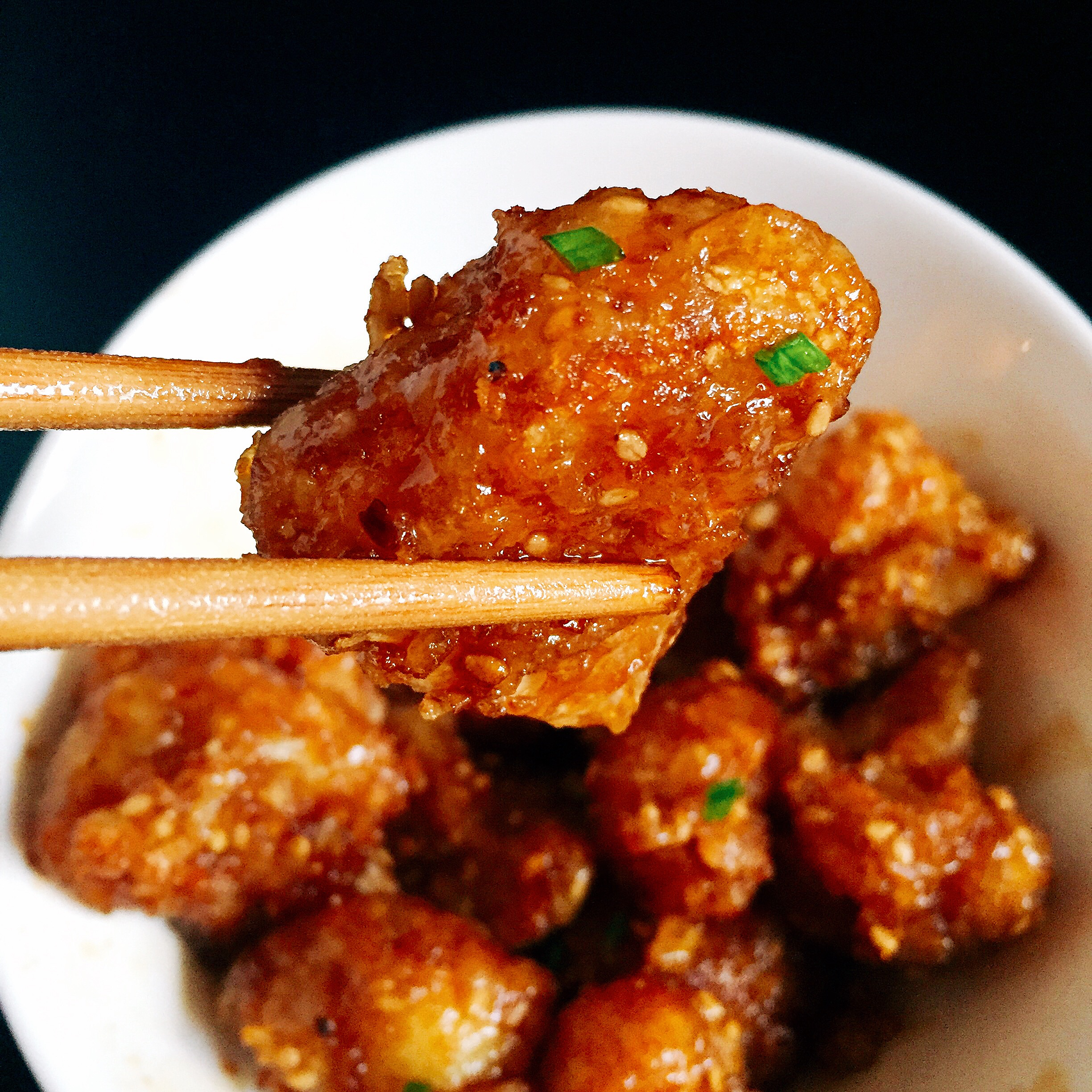
Korean fried cauliflower

Cauliflower heads can be roasted, grilled, boiled, fried, steamed, pickled, or eaten raw. When cooking, the outer leaves and thick stalks are typically removed, leaving only the florets (the edible "curd" or "head"). The leaves are also edible but are often discarded.

Cauliflower can be used as a low-calorie, gluten-free alternative to rice and flour. Between 2012 and 2016, cauliflower production in the United States increased by 63%, and cauliflower-based product sales increased by 71% between 2017 and 2018. Cauliflower rice is made by pulsing cauliflower florets and cooking the result in oil. Cauliflower pizza crust is made from cauliflower flour. Mashed cauliflower is a low-carbohydrate alternative to mashed potatoes.

== In culture ==
Cauliflower has been noticed by mathematicians for its distinct fractal dimension, calculated to be roughly 2.8. One of the fractal properties of cauliflower is that every branch, or "module", is similar to the entire cauliflower. Another quality, also present in other plant species, is that the angle between "modules", as they become more distant from the center, is 360 degrees divided by the golden ratio.

The fancied resemblance of the shape of a boxer's ear to a cauliflower gave rise to the term "cauliflower ear".
