= Jersey cabbage =

Variety of cabbage

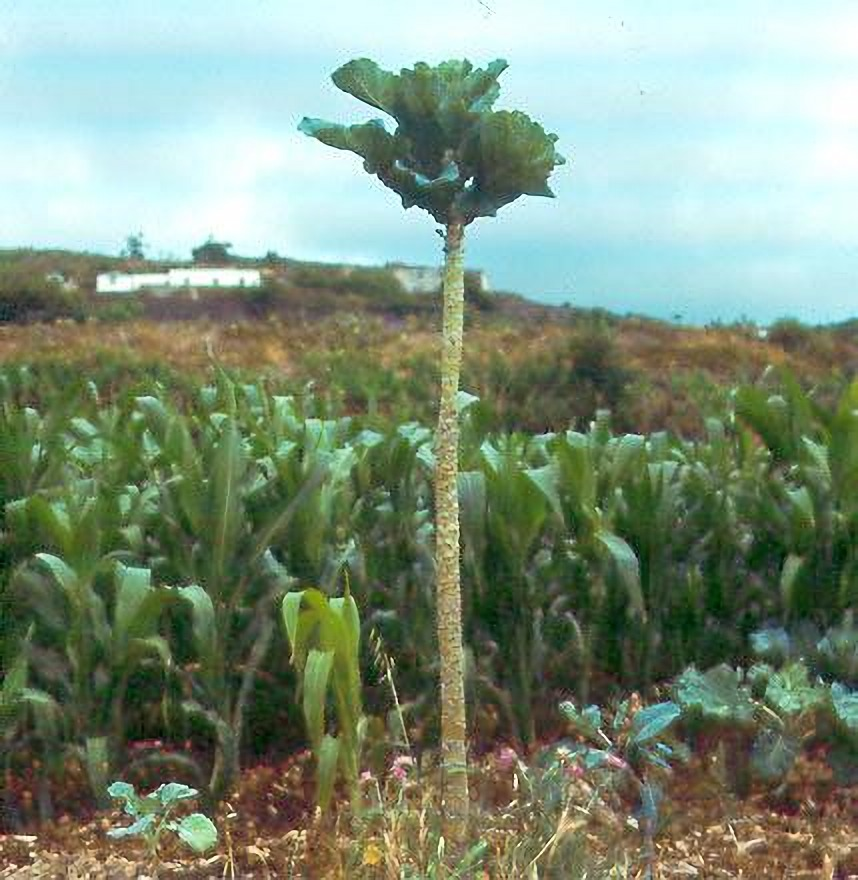
- Jersey cabbage can be cultivated to grow quite large, especially in frost-free climates
- Species: Brassica oleracea longata

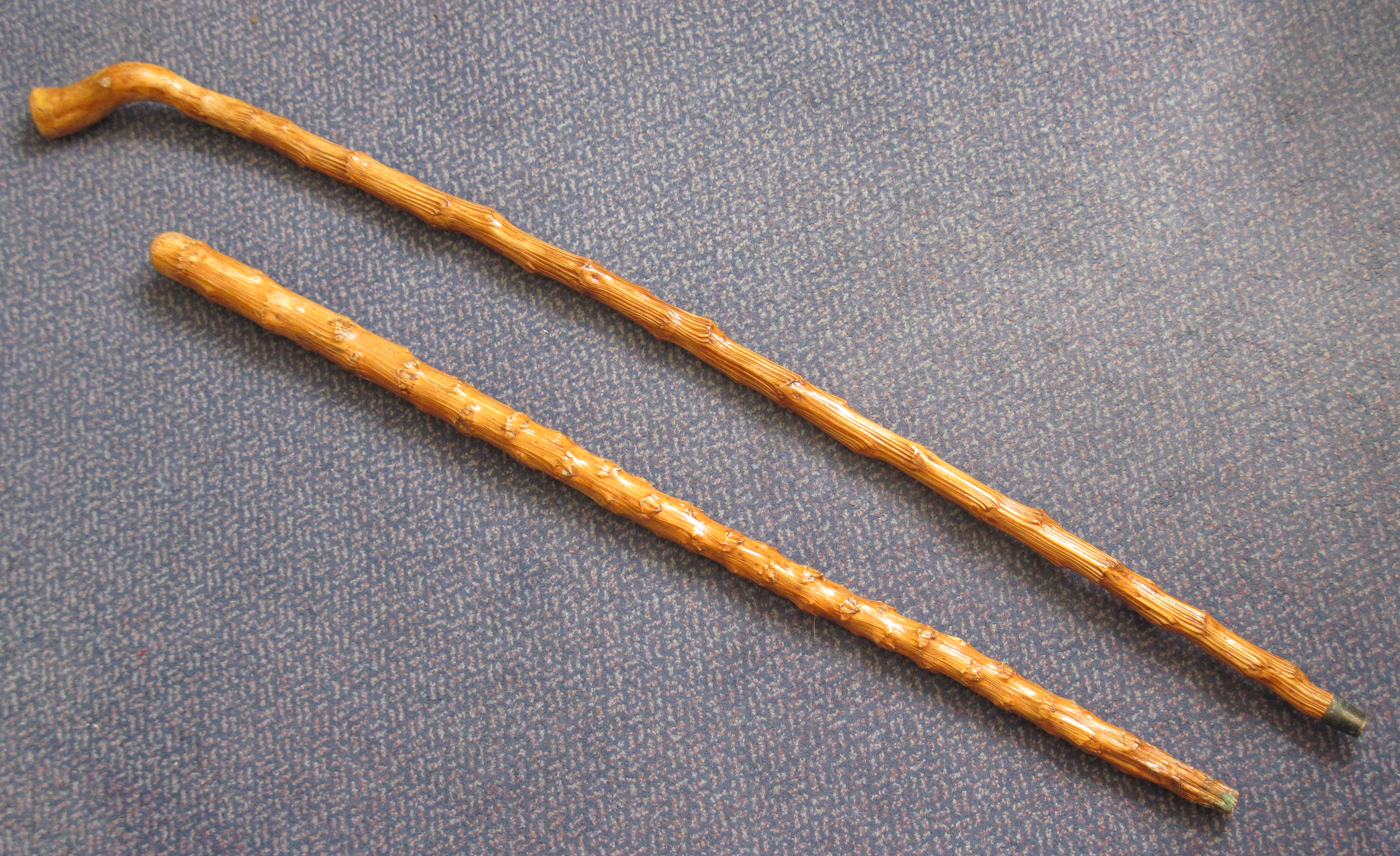
Bâtons d'chour - walking sticks made from the long stalk of Jersey cabbage.

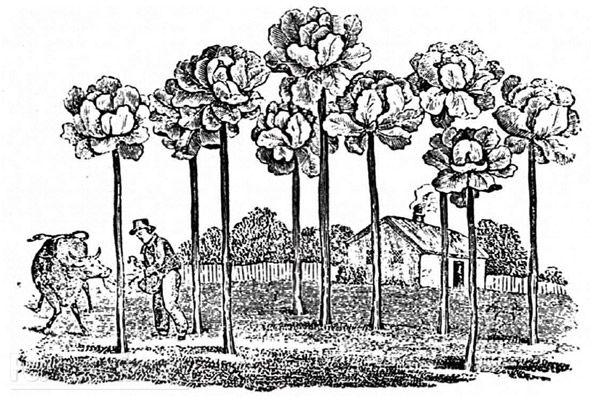
Jersey kale, as illustrated in The Farmer's Magazine, 1836.

The Jersey cabbage (Brassica oleracea longata) is a variety of cabbage native to the Channel Islands that grows to a great height and was formerly commonly used there as livestock fodder and for making walking sticks. It is also known as Jersey kale or cow cabbage, and by a variety of local names including giant cabbage, long jacks, tree cabbage and the French chour and chou à vacque.

The Jersey cabbage develops a long stalk, commonly reaching 6 to 10 feet (1.8 to 3.0 m) in height, and can grow as tall as 18 to 20 feet (5.5 to 6.1 m). Historically the stalks were made into walking sticks, of which 30,000 a year were being sold by the early 20th century, many for export. They were also used for fencing and as rafters. Much of the stalk is bare; the islanders stripped leaves to accentuate this effect and induce it to grow without twisting, varnished the stalk, and created a handle either by heat-treating and bending the root end or by planting at an angle to produce a naturally bent root.

The lower leaves were fed to livestock (one variety in Portugal was grown specifically for the purpose), and were reportedly of great value: The Farmer's Magazine stated in 1836 that five plants would support 100 sheep or 10 cows, and sheep fed them were rumoured to produce silky wool up to 25 inches (64 cm) in length. The open cabbage at the top is comparatively small: "the size of the cabbages at the top was so infinitesimal that one seemed forced to the conviction that nature meant them to be stalks, not cabbages".

The plant is now rarely grown in the Channel Islands, except for feeding rabbits although it is still cultivated for walking sticks by Philip and Jacquelyn Johnson, who were shown on the BBC One series Countryfile in January 2010.

== See also ==
- Liz Truss lettuce
