= Broccoflower =

Edible plant

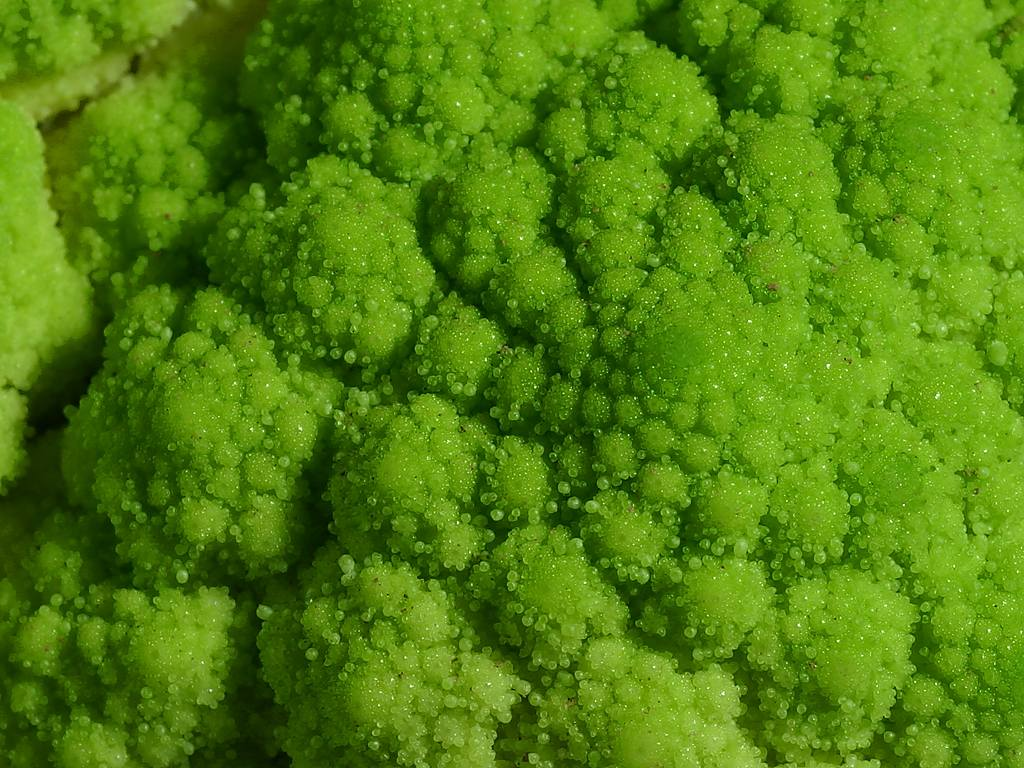
- Broccoflower
- Species: Brassica oleracea
- Cultivar group: Botrytis cultivar group

Broccoflower is either of two edible plants of the species Brassica oleracea with light green heads. The edible portion is the immature flower head (inflorescence) of the plant.

Broccoli and cauliflower are different cultivars of the same species, and as such are fully cross compatible by hand pollination or natural pollinators. There are two forms of Brassica oleracea that may be referred to as broccoflower, both of which are considered cultivars of cauliflower (Brassica oleracea var. botrytis) because they have inflorescent meristems rather than flower buds when harvested. One is shaped like regular cauliflower, the other has pointed, conical, spiraling clusters of florets. They share a curd color that is a similar hue to that of broccoli.

== Green cauliflower ==
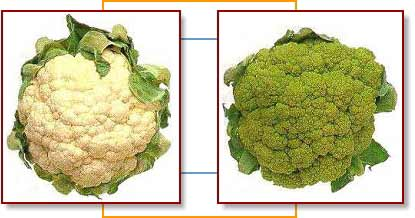
Broccoflower can sometimes refer to green cauliflower (right), in contrast to white variants (left)

The first form of broccoflower has the physical attributes of a white cauliflower, but the curd color is lime-green. There are several cultivars of green cauliflower on the market, with the first release being Green Ball, with parentage of both broccoli and cauliflower. The California firm Tanimura & Antle trademarked the word "Broccoflower" for the green cauliflower that it markets.

== Romanesco broccoli ==
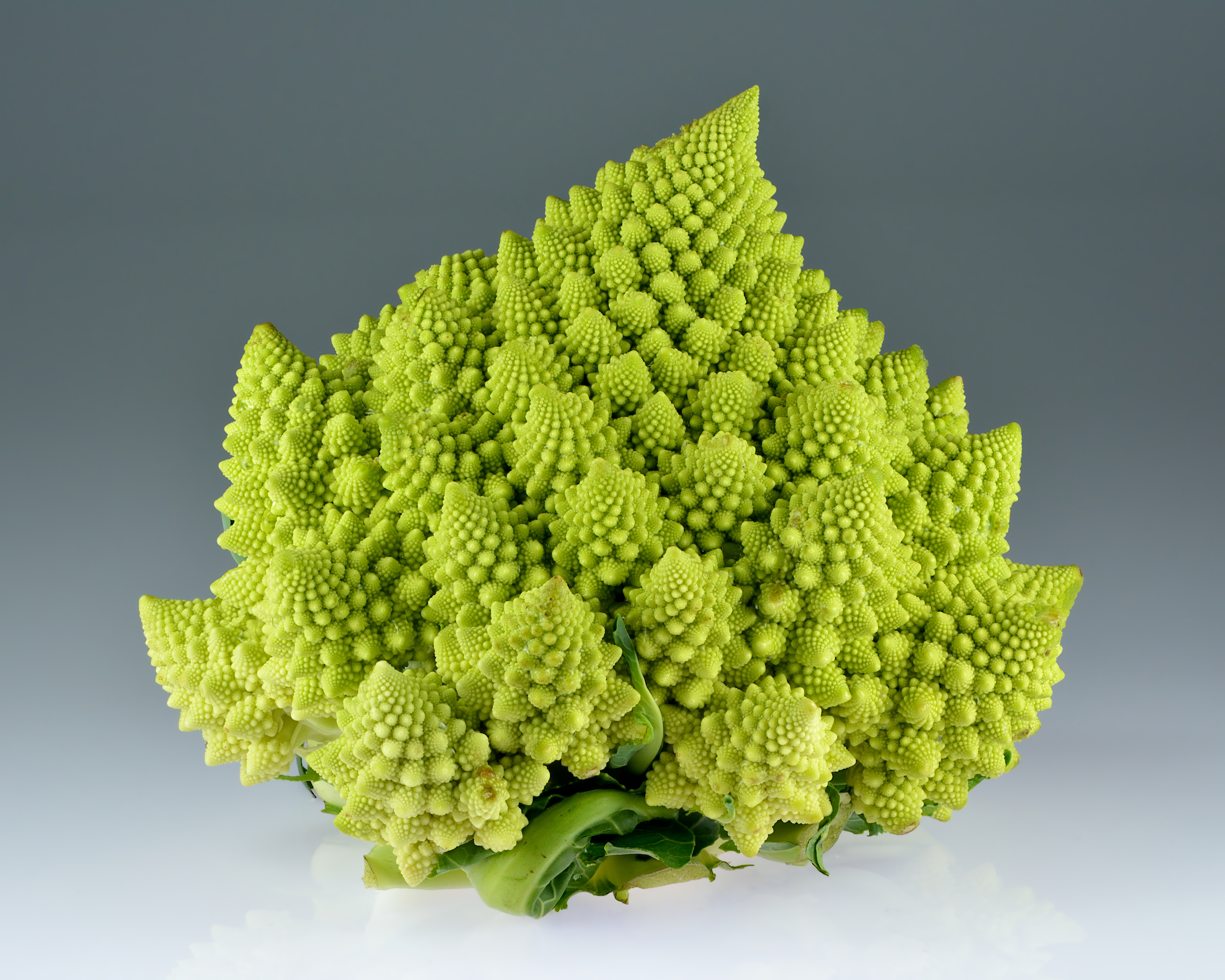
The name broccoflower also refers to Romanesco broccoli

The second form is Romanesco broccoli, which is characterised by the striking and unusual fractal patterns of its flower head. It has a yellow or vibrant green curd color.
