= Acephala group =

Type of Brassica plants

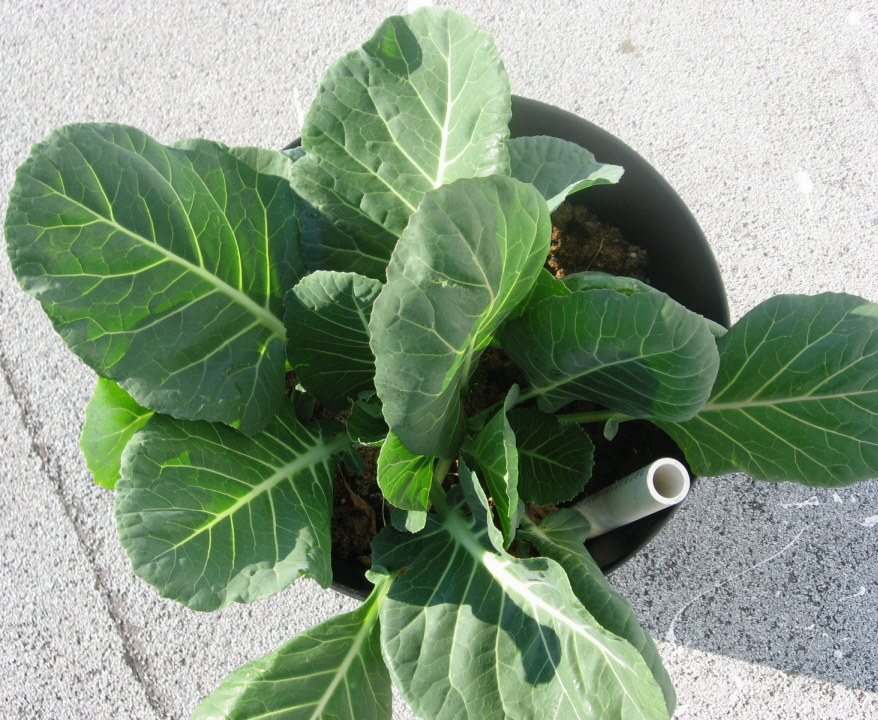
- Three young plants of non-heading collard greens growing in a small office wastebasket with a water reservoir at the bottom
- Species: Brassica oleracea
- Cultivar group: Acephala Group
- Origin: unknown
- Cultivar group members: Many; see text.

The Acephala group refers to any type of Brassica which grows without the central 'head' typical of many varieties of cabbage. These are included within the species Brassica oleracea, such as kale (Brassica oleracea var. acephala). The name literally means "without a head" in contrast to those varieties known as capitata or "with a head". This group includes a number of species, both wild and cultivated, many of which are grown for their edible leaves and flowers.

== Groups of cultivars ==
Different sources break down the Brassica genus into different grouping as shown below:

=== Mabberley ===
Mabberley (q.v.) has these groups: Napobrassica Group / Pabularia Group / Acephala Group / Alboglabra Group / Botrytis Group / Capitata Group / Gemmifera Group / Gongylodes Group / Italica Group / Tronchuda Group / Chinensis Group / Japonica Group / Pekinensis Group / Perviridis Group / Rapifera Group

=== Royal Botanic Gardens Kew ===
Royal Botanic Gardens Kew has eight cultivar groups: Acephala Group (kale, borecole, collards) / Alboglabra Group (Chinese kale, Chinese broccoli, gai lan, kai lan) / Botrytis Group (broccoli, cauliflower, broccoflower, calabrese) / Capitata Group (cabbage, Savoy cabbage, red cabbage) / Gemmifera Group (sprouts, Brussels sprouts) / Gongylodes Group (kohlrabi, knol-kohl) / Italica Group (purple sprouting, sprouting broccoli) / Tronchuda Group (Portuguese cabbage, seakale cabbage)

== Members ==
The Acephala group of cultivars or variety for the species Brassica oleracea includes:

- kale, or borecole, or colewort
- curly kale
- Tuscan kale (cavolo nero), also known as black kale, Lacinato kale, or palm tree kale
- collard
- decorative kale, ornamental kale, flowering kale, flowering cabbage, or ornamental cabbage
- Jersey cabbage, Brassica oleracea longata. The long woody stems are used for walking sticks and the foliage for cow-fodder.
- Scotch kale

Acephala means "no head" as the plants have leaves with no central head; the opposite arrangement of white cabbage, or Savoy cabbage. Each cultivar has a different genome owing to mutation, evolution, ecological niche, and intentional plant-breeding by humans. Mabberley (1997, p. 120) has the Acephala group in three sub-groups: kale, borecole, and collards.
