= Crop wild relative =

Wild plant closely related to a domesticated plant

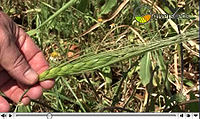
Wild emmer wheat (Triticum dicoccoides), a CWR of cultivated wheats (Triticum spp), can be found in northern Israel.

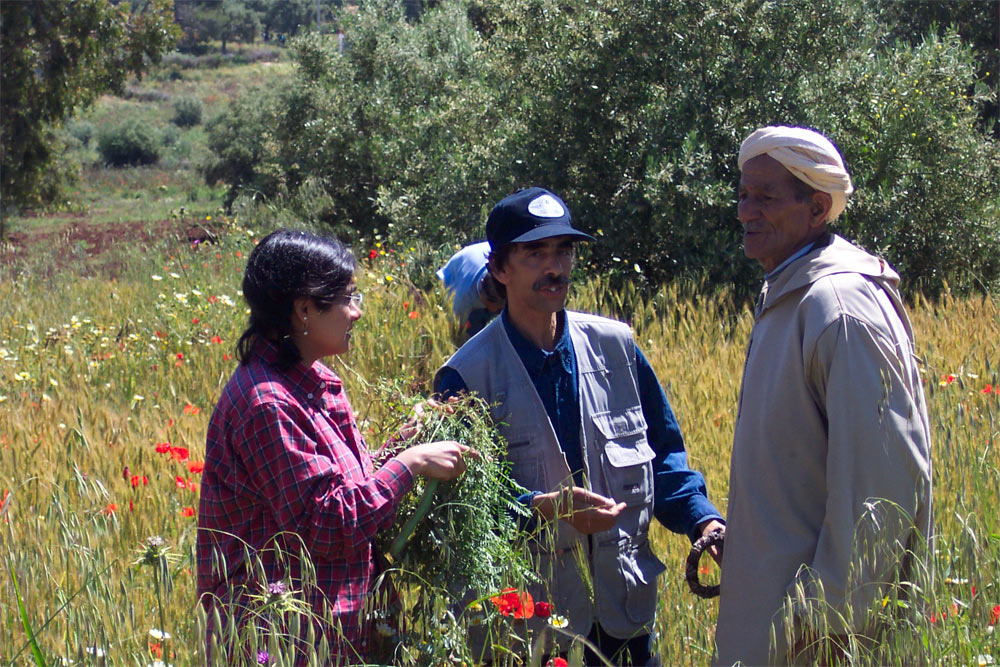
Two conservationists collecting indigenous knowledge on cultural practices that favour CWR populations, from a farmer near Fes, Morocco.

A crop wild relative (CWR) is a wild plant closely related to a domesticated plant. It may be a wild ancestor of the domesticated (cultivated) plant or another closely related taxon.

== Overview ==
The wild relatives of crop plants constitute an increasingly important resource for improving agricultural production and for maintaining sustainable agro-ecosystems. Their natural selection in the wild accumulates a rich set of useful traits that can be introduced into crop plants by crossing. With the advent of anthropogenic climate change and greater ecosystem instability CWRs are likely to prove a critical resource in ensuring food security for the new millennium. It was Nikolai Vavilov, the Russian botanist who first realized the importance of crop wild relatives in the early 20th century. Genetic material from CWRs has been utilized by humans for thousands of years to improve the quality and yield of crops. Farmers have used traditional breeding methods for millennia, wild maize (Zea mexicana) is routinely grown alongside maize to promote natural crossing and improve yields. More recently, plant breeders have utilised CWR genes to improve a wide range of crops like rice (Oryza sativa), tomato (Solanum lycopersicum) and grain legumes.

CWRs have contributed many useful genes to crop plants, and modern varieties of most major crops now contain genes from their wild relatives. Therefore, CWRs are wild plants related to socio-economically important species including food, fodder and forage crops, medicinal plants, condiments, ornamental, and forestry species, as well as plants used for industrial purposes, such as oils and fibres, and to which they can contribute beneficial traits. A CWR can be defined as "... a wild plant taxon that has an indirect use derived from its relatively close genetic relationship to a crop...”

== Conservation of crop wild relatives ==
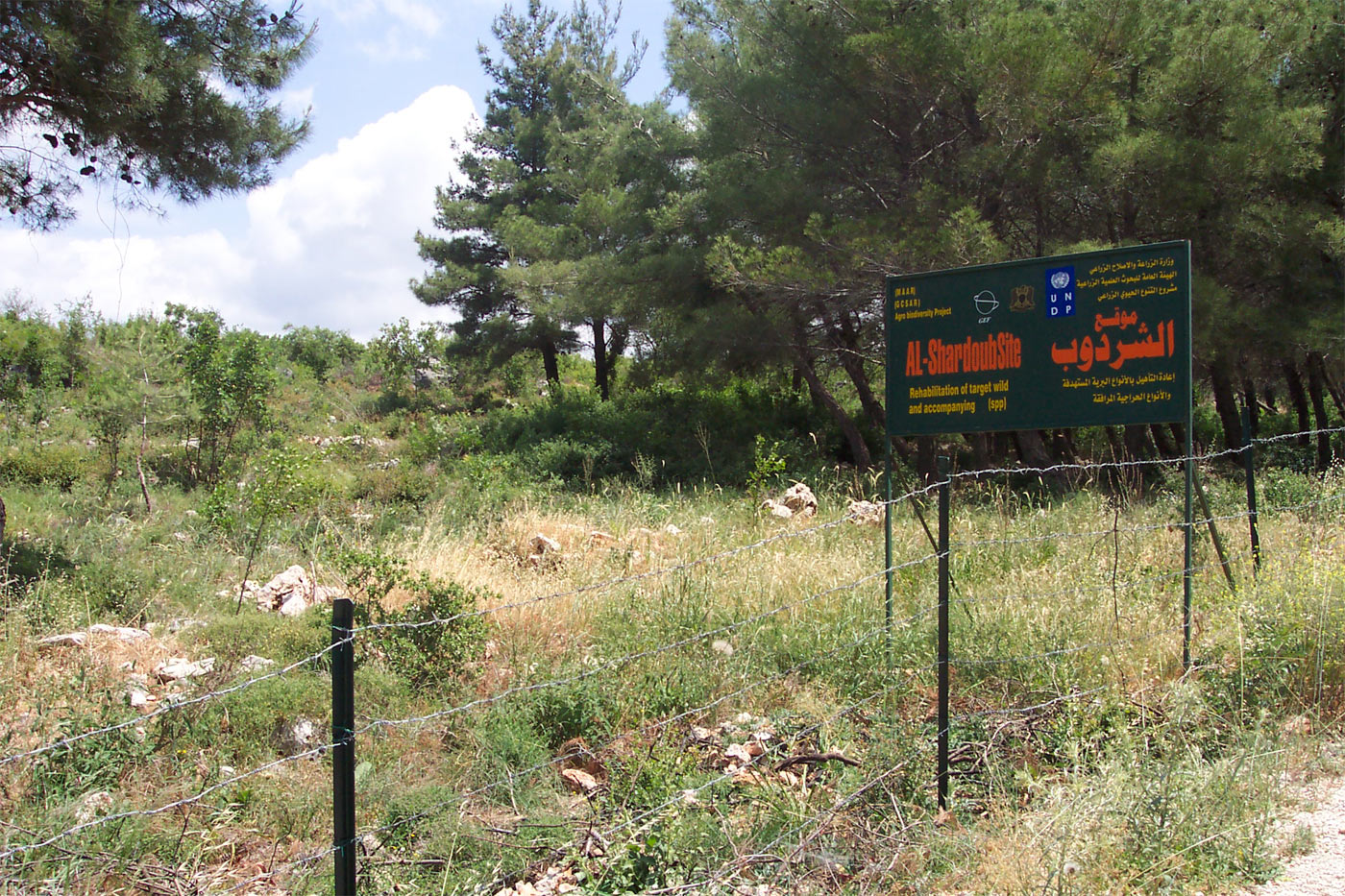
Example of one of the first genetic reserves established to conserve CWRs near Kalakh al Hosn, Syria

CWRs are essential components of natural and agricultural ecosystems and hence are indispensable for maintaining ecosystem health. Their conservation and sustainable use is very important for improving agricultural production, increasing food security, and maintaining a healthy environment.

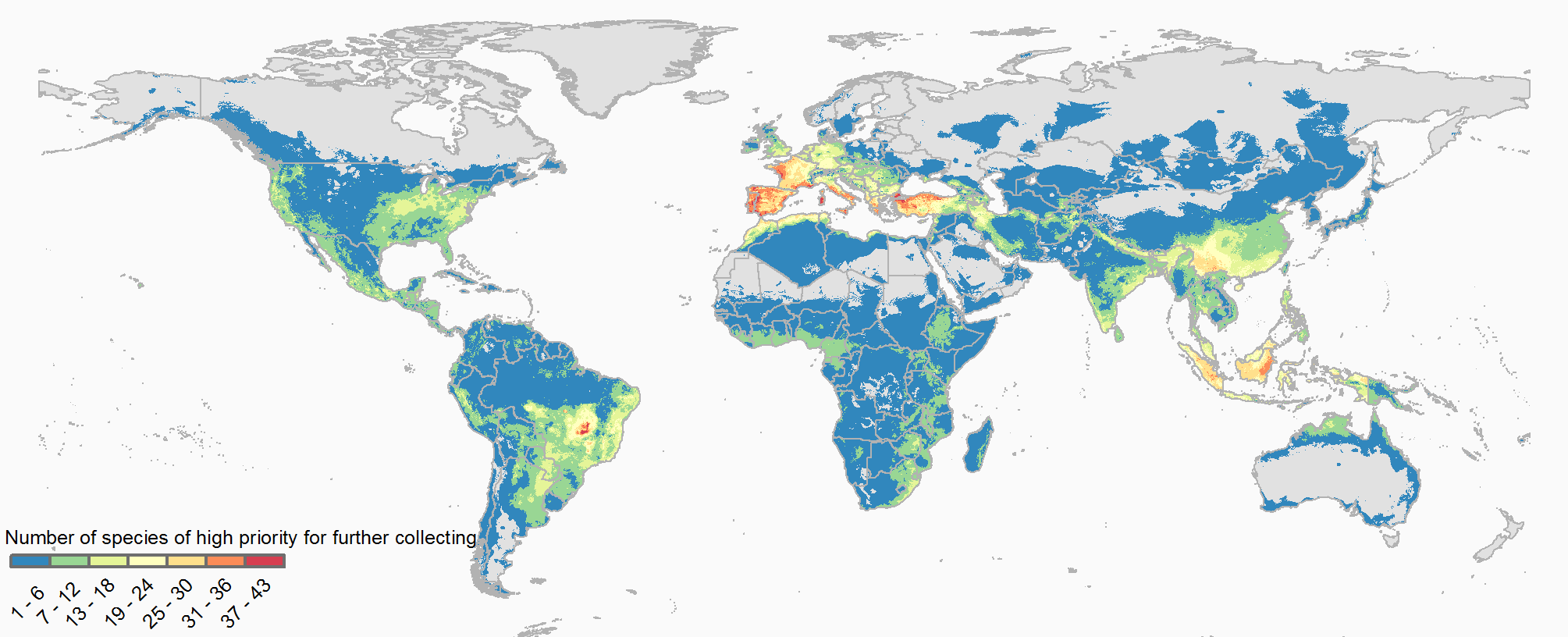
Geographic hotspots of distributions of crop wild relatives not represented in genebanks

The natural populations of many CWRs are increasingly at risk. They are threatened by habitat loss through the destruction and degradation of natural environment or their conversion to other uses. Deforestation is leading to the loss of many populations of important wild relatives of fruit, nut, and industrial crops. Populations of wild relatives of cereal crops that occur in arid or semi-arid lands are being severely reduced by over grazing and resulting desertification. The growing industrialization of agriculture is drastically reducing the occurrence of CWRs within the traditional agro-ecosystems. The wise conservation and use of CWRs are essential elements for increasing food security, eliminating poverty, and maintaining the environment.

Conservation strategies for CWRs often consider both in situ and ex situ conservation. These are complementary approaches to CWR conservation, since each has its own advantages and disadvantages. For example, whilst ex situ conservation protects CWR (or more correctly, their genes) from threats in the wild, it can limit evolution and adaptation to new environmental challenges.

In 2016, 29% of wild relative plant species were completely missing from the world’s genebanks, with a further 24% represented by fewer than 10 samples. Over 70% of all crop wild relative species worldwide were in urgent need of further collecting to improve their representation in genebanks, and over 95% were insufficiently represented with regard to the full range of geographic and ecological variation in their native distributions. While the most critical priorities for further collecting were found in the Mediterranean and Near East, Western and Southern Europe, Southeast and East Asia, and South America, crop wild relatives insufficiently represented in genebanks are distributed across almost all countries worldwide.

== Examples of wild relatives ==
=== Grains ===
- Oats (Avena sativa) – Avena byzantina
- Quinoa (Chenopodium quinoa) – Chenopodium berlandieri
- Finger Millet (Eleusine coracana) – Eleusine africana
- Barley (Hordeum vulgare) – Hordeum arizonicum and Hordeum spontaneum
- Rice (Oryza sativa) – Oryza rufipogon
- African Rice (Oryza glaberrima) – Oryza barthii
- Pearl Millet (Pennisetum glaucum) – Pennisetum purpureum
- Rye (Secale cereale subsp. cereale) – Secale cereale subsp. dighoricum
- Sorghum (Sorghum bicolor) – Sorghum arundinaceum and Sorghum halepense
- Broom millet (Panicum miliaceum) – Panicum fauriei
- Wheat (Triticum aestivum) – Einkorn wheat (Triticum monococcum)
- Maize (Zea mays subsp. mays) – Zea diploperennis

=== Vegetables ===
Note: Many different vegetables share one common ancestor, particularly in the Brassica genus of plants (cruciferous vegetables). Many vegetables are also hybrids of different species, again this is particularly true of Brassicas (see e.g. triangle of U).

- Asparagus (Asparagus officinalis) – Asparagus dauricus
- Beet (Beta vulgaris subsp. vulgaris) – Beta vulgaris subsp. maritima
- Black Mustard (Brassica nigra) – Wild mustard (Sinapis arvensis)
- Cabbage (Brassica oleracea var. capitata) - Brassica elongata
- Carrot (Daucus carota) – Daucus gracilis
- Garlic (Allium sativum var. sativum) – Allium atroviolaceum
- Leek (Allium ampeloprasum) – Welsh onion (Allium fistulosum)
- Lettuce (Lactuca sativa) – Prickly lettuce (Lactuca serriola)
- Mustard (Brassica juncea subsp. juncea) – Brassica carinata
- Onion (Allium cepa var. cepa) – Allium galanthum
- Rape (Brassica napus var. napus) – Common dogmustard (Erucastrum gallicum)
- Spinach (Spinacea oleracea) – Spinacia turkestanica
- Squash (Cucurbita pepo subsp. pepo) – Cucurbita okeechobeensis
- Turnip (Brassica rapa subsp. rapa) – Brassica rapa

=== Fruits ===
- Almond (Prunus dulcis) – Chinese plum (Prunus salicina and many others)
- Apple (Malus domestica) – mostly Malus sieversii, but with some cultivars perhaps belonging to Malus sylvestris or being a hybrid of the two.
- Apricot (Prunus armeniaca) – Prunus brigantina
- Avocado (Persea americana) – Persea schiedeana
- Banana – Musa acuminata, Musa balbisiana and Musa schizocarpa
- Breadfruit (Artocarpus altilis) – Jackfruit (Artocarpus heterphyllus)
- Cacao (Theobroma cacao) – Theobroma angustifolium
- Cherry (Prunus avium) – Prunus mahaleb
- Cucumber (Cucumis sativus) – Cucumis hystrix
- Eggplant (Solanum melongena) – Thorn apple (Solanum incanum), Solanum insanum
- Grape (Vitis vinifera) – European wild grape (Vitis sylvestris). Hybrids exist also including other Vitis species.
- Grapefruit (Citrus paradisi) – Citrus medica
- Lemon (Citrus limon) – Citrus indica
- Mango (Mangifera indica) – Mangifera altissima
- Orange (Citrus sinensis) – Key lime (Citrus aurantiifolia)
- Papaya (Carica papaya) – Jarilla chocola
- Peach (Prunus persica var. persica) – Prunus tomentosa
- Pear (Pyrus communis) – Pyrus pyraster and Pyrus caucasica
- Pepper (Capsicum annuum) – Capsicum baccatum
- Pineapple (Ananas comosus) – Ananas bracteatus
- Plum (Prunus domesticus subsp. domestica)- Prunus spinosa and Prunus cerasifera
- Pumpkin (Cucurbita maxima subsp. maxima) – Cucurbita ecuadorensis
- Strawberry (Fragaria× ananassa)
- Tomato (Solanum lycopersicum) – Solanum chilense
- Watermelon (Citrullus lanatus var. lanatus) – Bitter apple (Citrullus colocynthis)

=== Oilseeds ===
- Peanut (Arachis hypogaea subsp. hypogaea) – Arachis duranensis
- Sunflower (Helianthus annuus) – Helianthus exilis
- Soya (Glycine max) – Glycine clandestina
- Safflower (Carthamus tinctorius) – Carthamus creticus
- Rapeseed (Brassica napus) – Brassica rapa, Brassica oleracea

=== Pulses ===
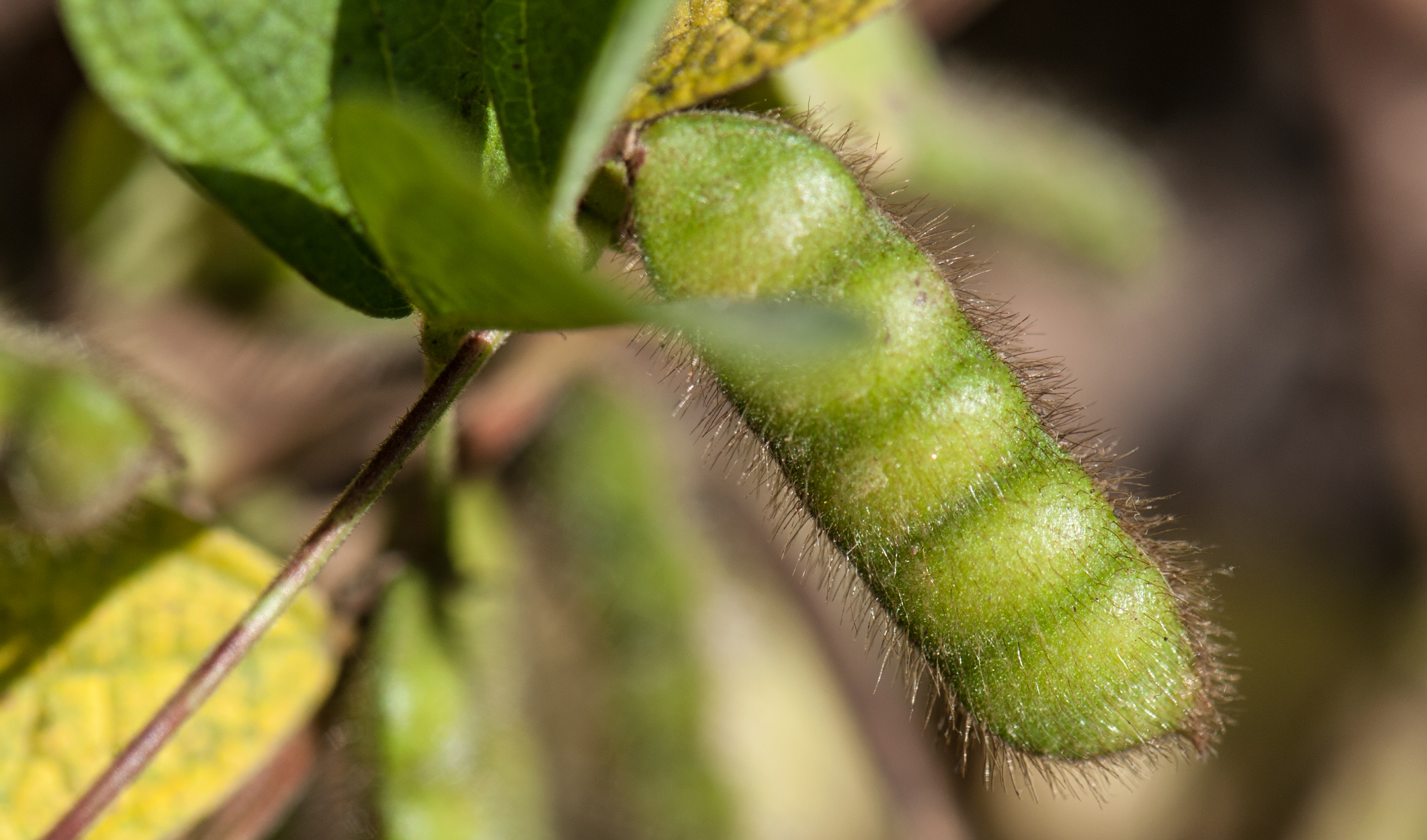
Cajanus scarabaeoides is one of the closest wild relatives to the cultivated pigeonpea and has high drought tolerance and high protein content. Being screened at the campus of the International Crops Research Institute for the Semi-Arid Tropics in Patancheru, India.

- Lentil (Lens culinaris) – Lens ervoides
- Garden Pea (Pisum sativum) – Pisum fulvum
- Butter Bean (Phaseolus lunatus) – Phaseolus augusti
- Garden Bean (Phaseolus vulgaris) – Phaseolus coccineus
- Faba Bean (Vicia faba) – Vicia johannis
- Grasspea (Lathyrus sativus) – Lathyrus tuberosus
- Cowpea (Vigna unguiculata) – Vigna monantha
- Bambara groundnut (Vigna subterranea) – Vigna hosei
- Pigeonpea (Cajanus cajan) – Cajanus albicans, Cajanus scarabaeoides, Cajanus sericeus, Cajanus acutifolius
- Chickpea (Cicer arietinum) – Cicer reticulatum, Cicer echinospermum
- Vetch (Vicia sativa) – Vicia barbazitae
- Adzuki bean (Vigna angularis var. angularis) – Vigna umbellata
- Black gram bean (Vigna mungo var. mungo) – Vigna grandiflora
- Mung bean (Vigna radiata var. radiata) – Vigna stipulacea

=== Forages ===
- Alfalfa (Medicago sativa) - Medicago arborea and Medicago truncatula

=== Tubers ===
- Sweet potato (Ipomoea batatas) – Ipomoea triloba, Ipomoea cynanchifolia, Ipomoea leucantha and Ipomoea trifida
- Cassava (Manihot esculenta subsp. esculenta) – Manihot walkerae
- Potato (Solanum tuberosum) – Solanum chacoense

== See also ==
- List of domesticated plants
- Wild type
- Agricultural biodiversity
- Agriculture
- Agronomy
- Gene pool
- Australian Grains Genebank
- Plant genetic resources
