= List of plant hybrids =

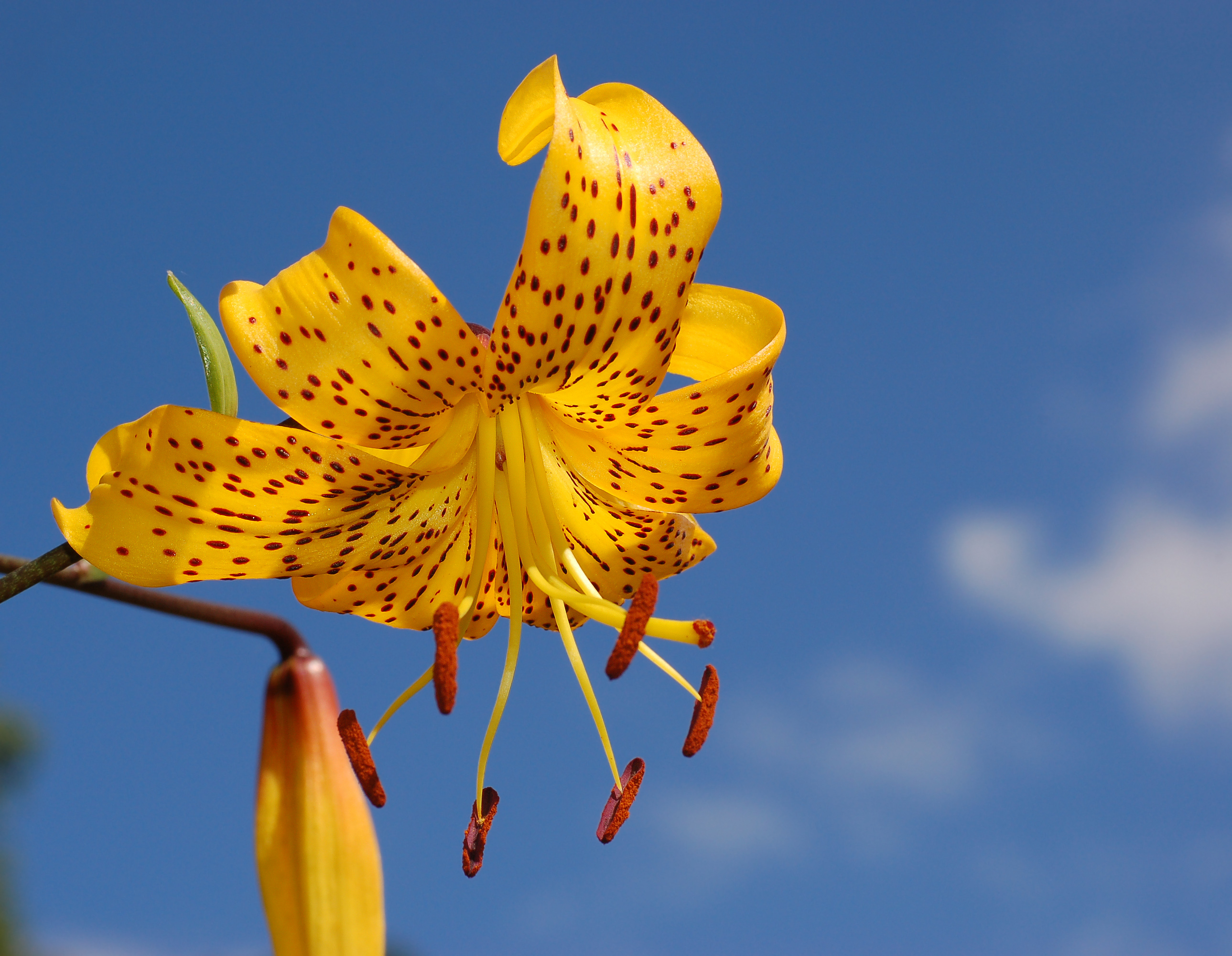
An ornamental lily hybrid known as Lilium 'Citronella'

This is a list of plant hybrids created intentionally or by chance and exploited commercially in agriculture or horticulture. The hybridization event mechanism is documented where known, along with the authorities who described it.

== Hybrids ==
Species	Common name	Family	Hybridization	Confirmed or putative hybridization?	Putative parental/ introgressive species	Polyploid or homoploid?	Polyploid chromosome count	References	Notes
Abelmoschus esculentus	Okra	Malvaceae	Allopolyploid origin	Putative	Uncertain	Polyploid (tetraploid)	usually 2n=4x=130	Joshi and Hardas, 1956; Schafleitner et al., 2013	Variable ploidy
Agave fourcroydes	Henequen	Asparagaceae	Allopolyploid origin	Confirmed	Uncertain	Polyploid (usu. pentaploid, triploid)	2n=5x(3x)=150(90)	Robert et al., 2008; Hughes et al., 2007	Variable ploidy, polyploid event not recent
Agave sisalana	Sisal	Asparagaceae	Allopolyploid origin	Confirmed	Uncertain	Polyploid (usu. pentaploid, hexaploid)	2n=5x(6x)=150(180)	Robert et al., 2008	Variable ploidy, polyploid event not recent
Allium ampeloprasum	Great headed garlic	Amaryllidaceae	Intraspecific hybrid origin	Putative	Allium ampeloprasum	Homoploid	–	Guenaoui et al., 2013	
Allium cepa	Common onion	Amaryllidaceae	Interspecific hybrid origin	Putative	Uncertain: Allium vavilovii, A. galanthum or A. fistulosum	Homoploid	–	Gurushidze et al., 2007	
Allium cornutum	Triploid onion	Amaryllidaceae	Triparental allopolyploid origin	Confirmed	Allium cepa, A. roylei, other Allium species	Polyploid (triploid)	2n=3x=24	Fredotovic et al., 2014	
Ananas comosus	Pineapple	Bromeliaceae	Interspecific introgression	Putative	Ananas ananassoides	Homoploid	–	Duval et al., 2003	
Annona × atemoya	Atemoya	Annonaceae	Interspecific hybrid origin	Confirmed	Annona cherimola and A. squamosa	?	–	Perfectti et al., 2004; Jalikop, 2010	
Arachis hypogaea	Peanut	Fabaceae	Allopolyploid origin	Confirmed	Arachis duranensis and A. ipaënsis	Polypoid (tetraploid)	2n=4x=40	Kochert et al., 1996; Bertioli et al., 2011	
Armoracia rusticana	Horseradish	Brassicaceae	Interspecific hybrid origin	Putative	Uncertain	?	–	Courter and Rhodes, 1969	
Artocarpus altilis	Breadfruit	Moraceae	Interspecific introgression	Putative	Artocarpus mariannensis	?	–	Zerega et al., 2005; Jones et al., 2013	
Avena sativa	Oat	Poaceae	Allopolyploid origin	Confirmed	Uncertain	Polyploid (hexaploid)	2n=6x=42	Linares et al., 1998; Oliver et al., 2013	
Brassica carinata	Ethiopian mustard	Brassicaceae	Allopolyploid origin	Confirmed	Brassica oleracea and B. nigra	Polyploid (tetraploid)	2n=4x=19	Arias et al., 2014	
Brassica juncea	Indian mustard	Brassicaceae	Allopolyploid origin	Confirmed	Brassica nigra and B. rapa	Polyploid (tetraploid)	2n=4x=18	Arias et al., 2014	
Brassica napus	Rapeseed, rutabega	Brassicaceae	Allopolyploid origin	Confirmed	Brassica rapa and B. oleracea	Polyploid (tetraploid)	2n=4x=19	Arias et al., 2014	
Cajanus cajan	Pigeon pea	Fabaceae	Intraspecific introgression, interspecific introgression	Putative	Wild Cajanus cajan and other Cajanus species	Homoploid	–	Kassa et al., 2012	
Cannabis sativa	Hemp	Cannabaceae	Intraspecific introgression	Putative	Cannabis sativa 'Indica' and 'Sativa' types	Homoploid	–	de Meijer and van Soest, 1992	
Carica pentagona	Babaco	Caricaceae	Interspecific hybrid origin	Confirmed	Uncertain (Carica stipulata, Vasconcellea pubescens, V. weberbaueri	?	–	Van Droogenbroeck et al., 2002; Van Droogenbroeck et al., 2006	
Carya illinoinensis	Pecan	Juglandaceae	Interspecific hybrid origin	Putative	Uncertain	?	–	Grauke et al., 2011	
Castanea dentata	American Chestnut	Fagaceae	Interspecific introgression	Confirmed	Castanea pumila	Homoploid	–	Li and Dane, 2013	Also ongoing efforts to introgress blight resistance from Castanea mollissima (see Jacobs et al., 2013)
Castanea sativa	Chestnut	Fagaceae	Intraspecific introgression	Confirmed	Castanea sativa Eurosiberian and Mediterranean populations	Homoploid	–	Villani et al., 1999; Mattioni et al., 2013	
Chenopodium quinoa	Quinoa	Chenopodiaceae	Allopolyploid origin	Putative	Uncertain	Polyploid (tetraploid)	–	Heiser, 1974; Ward, 2000; Maughan et al., 2004	
Cicer arietinum	Chickpea (pea-shaped)	Fabaceae	Intraspecific hybrid origin	Putative	Cicer arietinum Desi and Kabuli germplasm	?	–	Upadhyaya et al., 2008; Keneni et al., 2011	
Cichorium intybus	Radicchio	Asteraceae	Interspecific introgression	Confirmed	Wild Cichorium intybus	Homoploid	–	Kiaer et al., 2009	
Citrus aurantiifolia	Key lime	Rutaceae	Interspecific hybrid origin	Confirmed	Citrus medica and Citrus subg. Papeda	?	–	Ollitrault and Navarro, 2012; Penjor et al., 2014; Nicolosi et al., 2000; Moore, 2001	
Citrus aurantium	Sour oranges	Rutaceae	Interspecific hybrid origin	Confirmed	Citrus maxima and C. reticulata	?	–	Wu et al., 2014; Moore, 2001	
Citrus clementina	Clementine	Rutaceae	Interspecific hybrid origin	Confirmed	Citrus sinensis and C. reticulata	?	–	Wu et al., 2014	
Citrus limon	Lemon, lime	Rutaceae	Interspecific hybrid origin	Confirmed	Citrus medica, C. × aurantiifolia, and other Citrus species	?	–	Nicolosi et al., 2000; Moore, 2001	
Citrus paradisi	Grapefruit	Rutaceae	Interspecific hybrid origin	Confirmed	Citrus sinensis and C. maxima	?	–	Wu et al., 2014; Moore, 2001	
Citrus reticulata	Mandarin	Rutaceae	Interspecific introgression	Confirmed	Citrus maxima	?	–	Wu et al., 2014	
Citrus sinensis	Sweet orange (blood, common)	Rutaceae	Interspecific hybrid origin	Confirmed	Uncertain	?	–	Wu et al., 2014; Moore, 2001	
Cocos nucifera	Coconut	Arecaceae	Intraspecific introgression	Confirmed	Cocos nucifera Indo-Atlantic and Pacific lineages	Homoploid	–	Gunn et al., 2011	
Coffea arabica	Coffee	Rubiaceae	Allopolyploid origin	Confirmed	Coffea eugenioides and C. canephora	Polyploid (tetraploid)	2n=4x=44	Lashermes et al., 1999	
Corylus avellana	Hazelnut	Betulaceae	Intraspecific introgression	Confirmed	Wild Corylus avellana in southern Europe	Homoploid	–	Campa et al., 2011; Boccacci et al., 2013	
Cucurbita pepo	Winter squash, pumpkin	Cucurbitaceae	Intraspecific introgression	Putative	Cucurbita pepo var. texana	Homploid	–	Kirkpatrick and Wilson, 1988	
Daucus carota subsp. sativus	Carrot	Apiaceae	Intraspecific introgression	Confirmed	Daucus carota subsp. carota	Homoploid	–	Iorizzo et al., 2013; Simon, 2000	
Dioscorea species	Yam	Dioscoreaceae	Interspecific hybrid origin, introgression	Putative	Uncertain	Variable	–	Terauchi et al., 1992; Dansi et al., 1999; Bhattacharjee et al., 2011; Mignouna et al., 2002	Multiple species of putative hybrid (perhaps allopolyploid) origin including Dioscorea cayennensis subsp. rotundata and D. cayennensis
Diospyros kaki	Persimmon	Ebenaceae	Allopolyploid origin	Putative	Uncertain	Polyploid (hexaploid)		Yonemori et al., 2008	
Ficus carica	Fig	Moraceae	Interspecific introgression	Putative	Uncertain	?		Aradhya et al., 2010	
Fragaria ananassa	Strawberry	Rosaceae	Interspecific hybrid origin	Confirmed	Fragaria virginiana (octoploid), F. chiloensis (octoploid)	Homoploid relative to parentals (octoploid)	2n=8x=56	Evans, 1977; Hirakawa et al., 2014	Uncertain which species formed the octoploid progenitors
Garcinia mangostana	Mangosteen	Clusiaceae	Allopolyploid origin	Putative	Garcinia celebica and G. malaccensis	Polyploid (tetraploid)	?	Richards, 1990	Recent work shows this may not be of hybrid origin (Nazre, 2014)
Gossypium hirsutum	Upland cotton	Malvaceae	hybrid origin	Confirmed	Uncertain, referred to as 'A' and 'D'	Polyploid (formed <1MYA)	2n =4x=52	Wendel and Cronn 2003	Polyploidization likely led to agronomically significant traits (Applequist et al., 2001)
Hibiscus sabdariffa	Roselle	Malvaceae	Allopolyploid origin	Putative	Uncertain	Polyploid (tetraploid)	2n=4x=72	Menzel and Wilson, 1966; Satya et al., 2013	
Hordeum vulgare	Barley	Poaceae	Introgression	Confirmed	Hordeum spontaneum	Homoploid		Badr et al., 2000; Dai et al., 2012	
Humulus lupulus	Hops	Cannabaceae	Intraspecific introgression	Confirmed	Humulus lupulus North American and European germplasm	Homoploid		Reeves and Richards, 2011; Stajner et al., 2008; Seefelder et al., 2000	
Ipomoea batatas	Sweet potato	Convolvulaceae	Intraspecific introgression; Interspecific introgression?	Putative	Ipomoea batatas Central American and South American germplasm	Homoploid relative to parentals		Roullier et al., 2013	
Juglans regia	Walnut	Juglandaceae	Interspecific hybridization	Confirmed	Juglans sigillata	Homoploid		Gunn et al., 2010	
Lactuca sativa	Lettuce	Asteraceae	Intraspecific hybrid origin	Putative	Lactuca serriola and other Lactuca species	Homoploid		de Vries, 1997	
Lagenaria siceraria	Bottle Gourd	Cucurbitaceae	Intraspecific introgression	Confirmed	Lagenaria siceraria African/American and Asian germplasm	Homoploid		Clarke et al., 2006	
Lens culinaris subsp. culinaris	Lentil	Fabaceae	Intraspecific introgression	Putative	Wild lentil, Lens culinaris subsp. orientalis	Homoploid		Erskine et al., 2011	
Macadamia integrifolia	Macadamia	Proteaceae	Interspecific hybrid origin, interspecific introgression	Confirmed	Macadamia tetraphylla and other Macadamia species	Homoploid		Hardner et al., 2009; Steiger et al., 2003; Aradhya et al., 1998	
Malus domestica	Apple	Rosaceae	Interspecific hybrid origin	Confirmed	Malus sieversii, M. sylvestris, and possibly other Malus species	Homoploid		Cornille et al., 2012	
Mentha piperita	Peppermint	Lamiaceae	Allopolyploid origin	Confirmed	Mentha aquatica and M. spicata	Polyploid (12-ploid)	2n=12x=66 or 72	Harley and Brighton, 1977; Gobert et al., 2002	
Musa paradisiaca	Banana	Musaceae	Allopolyploid origin	Confirmed	Musa acuminata and M. balbisiana	Polyploid (usually triploid)	2n=3x=33	Simmonds and Shepherd, 1955; Heslop-Harrison and Schwarzacher, 2007; De Langhe et al., 2010	
Nicotiana tabacum	Tobacco	Solanaceae	Allopolyploid origin	Confirmed	Uncertain (Nicotiana sylvestris and N. tomentosiformis)	Polyploid (tetraploid)	2n=4x=48	Kenton et al., 1993; Murad et al., 2002	
Olea europaea	Olive	Oleaceae	Intraspecific introgression	Putative	Wild Olea europaea, western and eastern germplasm	Homoploid		Kaniewski et al., 2012; Besnard et al., 2013; Breton et al., 2006; Rubio de Casas et al., 2006; Besnard et al., 2007; Besnard et al., 2000	
Opuntia species	Opuntia	Cactaceae	Interspecific hybrid origin, Allopolyploid origin	Putative	Including Opuntia ficus-indica	Polyploid, homoploid		Hughes et al., 2007; Griffith, 2004	
Oryza sativa	Rice	Poaceae	Intraspecific introgression, interspecific introgression	Putative	Oryza sativa 'Japonica' and 'Indica' germplasm, Oryza rufipogon	Homoploid		Caicedo et al., 2007; Gao and Innan, 2008	
Oxalis tuberosa	Oca	Oxalidaceae	Allopolyploid origin	Putative	Uncertain	Polyploid (octaploid)	2n=8x=64	Emswhiller and Doyle, 2002; Emshwiller 2002; Emswhiller et al., 2009	
Pennisetum glaucum	Pearl millet	Poaceae	Intraspecific introgression	Confirmed	Wild Pennisetum glaucum	Homoploid		Oumar et al., 2008	
Persea americana	Avocado (Hass and other cultivars)	Lauraceae	Intraspecific introgression	Confirmed	Persea americana 'Guatamalensis', 'Drymifolia', and 'Americana'	Homoploid		Chen et al., 2008; Davis et al., 1998; Ashworth and Clegg, 2003; Douhan et al., 2011	
Phoenix dactylifera	Date palm	Arecaceae	Interspecific hybrid origin	Putative	Uncertain	Homoploid		El Hadrami et al., 2011; Bennaceur et al., 1991	
Piper methysticum	Kava	Piperaceae	Allopolyploid origin	Putative	Piper wichmannii and P. gibbiflorum	Polyploid (decaploid)	2n=10x=130	Singh, 2004; Lebot et al., 1991	
Pistacia vera	Pistachio	Anacardiaceae	Interspecific introgression	Putative	Pistacia atlantica, P. chinensis subsp. integerrima	Homoploid		Kafkas et al., 2001	
Pisum abyssinicum	Abyssinian Pea	Fabaceae	Interspecific hybrid origin	Confirmed	Uncertain (Pisum fulvum and other Pisum species)	Homoploid		Vershinin et al., 2003	
Pisum sativum	Pea	Fabaceae	Interspecific hybrid origin	Confirmed	Uncertain (Pisum sativum subsp. elatius and other Pisum species)	Homoploid		Vershinin et al., 2003	
Plinia cauliflora	Jaboticaba	Myrtaceae	Intraspecific hybridization, interspecific hybridization	Putative	Plinia 'Jaboticaba' and 'Cauliflora' germplasm; P. peruviana	Homoploid		Balerdi et al., 2006	
Prunus cerasus	Cherry	Rosaceae	Allopolyploid origin	Confirmed	Prunus avium and P. fruticosa	Polyploid (tetraploid)	2n=4x=32	Tavaud et al., 2004; Olden and Nybom, 1968	
Prunus domestica	Plum	Rosaceae	Allopolyploid origin	Confirmed	Uncertain (Prunus cerasifera and P. spinosa	Polyploid (hexaploid)	2n=6x=48	Zohary, 1992; Hartmann and Neumuller, 2009	Also hybridizes with other cultivated Prunus species
Prunus dulcis	Almond	Rosaceae	Interspecific introgression	Confirmed	Prunus orientalis and other Prunus species	Homoploid		Delplancke et al., 2012; Delplancke et al., 2013	
Pyrus species	Pear	Rosaceae	Interspecific hybrid origin	Confirmed	Many species	Homoploid		Silva et al., 2014	Also introgression with semidomesticated populations (see Iketani et al. 2009)
Raphanus raphanistrum subsp. sativus	Radish	Brassicaceae	Intraspecific introgression	Confirmed	Raphanus raphanistrum subsp. raphanistrum	Homoploid		Ridley et al., 2008	
Rheum cultivated species	Rhubarb	Polygonaceae	Interspecific hybrid origin	Putative	Unclear	Homoploid relative to parentals (tetraploid)		Foust and Marshall, 1991; Kuhl and Deboer, 2008	Hybrids include: Rheum rhaponticum L., R. rhabarbarum L., R. palmatum L.
Rubus species	Red raspberry, blackberry, tayberry, boysenberry, etc.	Rosaceae	Allopolyploid origin, interspecific hybridization	Confirmed	Many	Polyploid		Alice et al., 2014; Alice and Campbell, 1999	
Saccharum species	Sugarcane	Poaceae	Allopolyploid origin	Confirmed	Saccharum officinarum and S. spontaneum	Polyploid	Variable, 2n=10-13x=100-130	Grivet et al., 1995; D'Hont et al., 1996	
Secale cereale	Rye	Poaceae	Interspecific hybrid origin	Confirmed	Uncertain (Secale montanum, S. vavilovii)	Homoploid		Bartos et al., 2008; Korzun et al., 2001; Hillman, 1978; Tang et al., 2011; Salamini et al., 2002	
Sechium edule	Chayote	Cucurbitaceae	Interspecific introgression	Putative	Sechium compositum	Homoploid		Newstrom, 1991	
Setaria italica	Foxtail millet	Poaceae	Interspecific introgression	Confirmed	Setaria viridis	Homoploid		Till-Bottraud et al., 1992	
Solanum species section Petota	Potato	Solanaceae	Interspecific hybrid origin, allopolyploid origin, interspecific introgression	Confirmed	Including Solanum tuberosum, S. ajanhuiri, S. curtilobum, S. juzepczukii	Homoploid and Polyploid		Rodriguez et al., 2010; Eggers et al., 2021	
Solanum lycopersicum	Tomato	Solanaceae	Intraspecific introgression, interspecific introgression	Confirmed	Solanum lycopersicum var. cerasiforme and S. pimpinellifolium	Homoploid		Blanca et al., 2012; Causse et al., 2013; Rick, 1950	
Solanum melongena	Eggplant	Solanaceae	Interspecific hybrid origin, interspecific introgression, intraspecific introgression	Confirmed	Solanum undatum. and other Solanum species; wild S. melongena (= S. insanum)	Homoploid		Knapp et al., 2013; Meyer et al., 2012	Hybrid origin is not confirmed, but introgression is well documented
Solanum muricatum	Pepino dulce	Solanaceae	Interspecific hybrid origin, interspecific introgression	Likely	Solanum species in Series Caripensia	Homoploid		Blanca et al., 2007	Polyphyletic origin and extensive, ongoing introgression with wild species
Solanum tuberosum	Potato	Solanaceae	Intraspecific Hybrid	Confirmed	Diploid potato lines crossed with S. chacoense containing Sli gene	Homoploid		Lindhout et al., 2011	
Spondias purpurea	Jocote	Anacardiaceae	Interspecific introgression	Putative	Spondias mombin	Homoploid		Miller and Schaal, 2005	
Taxus × media	Anglojap yew	Taxaceae	Interspecific hybrid origin	Confirmed	Taxus baccata and Taxus cuspidata	Homoploid		Collins et al., 2003; He et al., 2022	
Theobroma cacao	Cacao (Trinitario-type)	Malvaceae	Intraspecific hybrid origin	Confirmed	Theobroma cacao 'Forastero' and 'Criollo' germplasm	Homoploid		Yang et al., 2013	
Triticum aestivum	Bread wheat, spelt	Poaceae	Allopolyploid origin	Confirmed	Triticum turgidum (tetraploid) with Aegilops tauschii	Polyploid (hexaploid)	2n=6x=42	Matsuoka, 2011; Dvorak, 2012	
Triticum turgidum	Emmer wheat, durum wheat	Poaceae	Allopolyploid origin	Confirmed	Triticum urartu and Aegilops speltoides	Polyploid (tetraploid)	2n=4x=28	Dvorak et al., 2012; Matsuoka, 2011; Yamane and Kawahara, 2005	
Vaccinium corymbosum	Highbush blueberry	Ericaceae	Interspecific hybrid origin, interspecific introgression	Putative	Vaccinium tenellum, V. darrowii, (V. virgatum, V. angustifolium)	Uncertain		Vander Kloet, 1980; Bruederle et al., 1994; Lyrene et al., 2003; Boches et al., 2006	Possible hybrid origin during the Pleistocene
Vanilla × tahitensis	Tahitian vanilla	Orchidaceae	Allopolyploid origin	Confirmed	Vanilla planifolia and V. odorata	Polyploid	Variable, 2n=2x(4x)=32(64)	Lubinsky et al., 2008	
Vitis rotundifolia	Grape	Vitaceae	Interspecific introgression	Confirmed	Many Vitis species	Homoploid	2n=2x=38	Reisch et al., 2012; This et al., 2006	
Zea mays	Maize	Poaeceae	Intraspecific introgression	Confirmed	Wild Zea mays (teosinte, =subsp. parviglumis)	Homoploid		Van Heerwaarden et al., 2011; Hufford et al., 2013	
