= Byne Blueberry Farms =

Blueberry farm in Waynesboro, Georgia, U.S.

Coordinates: 33.08819°N 82.01860°W

- Founded: 1980
- Founder: Dick Byne
- Website: byneblueberries.com

Byne Blueberry Farms is an organic blueberry farm in Waynesboro, Georgia. It is one of the earliest and most famous organic farms in the United States. Byne Blueberry Farms was started in 1980, before there was a National Organic Program, when owner Dick Byne became the first commercial blueberry grower in the Central Savannah River Area. Whole Foods and Earth Fare are some of the farm's biggest consumers. Privately owned by Dick Byne and his wife Linda Byne, the family runs the farm themselves with the help of their four daughters. The blueberries are grown on 20 of the 400 acres (1.6 km^{2}; 0.63 sq mi) that have been in the Byne family for generations. The remaining 380 acres (1.5 km^{2}; 0.59 sq mi) have been preserved as forest. The specific species of blueberry grown on the farm is the Rabbiteye blueberry, which is reputed for its sweetness and high level of fructose. This kind of blueberry is the most popular type of blueberry grown in the south. The farm was certified as organic in 1997, following a three-year certification process.

== Founder ==
Dick Byne graduated from Abraham Baldwin Agricultural College in 1973, and completed his bachelor's degree in agriculture at the University of Georgia. He used land he inherited from his family to start Byne Blueberry Farms in 1980. In 2002, he steered Byne Blueberry Farms to the production of over fifteen blueberry specialty products such as blueberry jam, jelly, butter, preserves, chow chow, chutney, syrup, honey, and also blueberry jalapeño jelly. Dick Byne says, “You know organic farming is nothing new.” “That’s how most farms were managed before World War II. We started growing organically because it was what I had learned in school, and it made sense economically, and again, it fit into what we thought would be a trend of people wanting to eat healthier, without chemicals in their food.” He also says it is important to give the soil as much organic matter as possible. “The more organic matter you have, the more the soil holds nutrients, and the more it holds water”.

== Awards ==
Dick Byne was awarded the 2009 Master Farmer award by his alma mater Abraham Baldwin Agricultural College in March 2009. The Farm won first place in the 2007 Flavor of Georgia Award for its famous blueberry salsa, and was runner up in 2009 for Blueberry Pecan Glaze.

== Experiment in composting ==
The latest experiment of Byne Blueberry Farms is to allow the city of Waynesboro to dump its yard clippings on the farm to be used as fertilizer, rather than being wasted. These clippings are rich in nutrients and will enhance the growth of the blueberries. “I’m pretty sure this will work out fine, but the EPD (Georgia Environmental Protection Division) has a job to do to make sure this is safe”, says Dick Byne. “I believe this is the beginning of something big. When and if this is approved, it’ll be a huge win for everybody”. If it is approved by the Georgia EPD, other farmers in Waynesboro will also be able to use these clippings for fertilizer.
