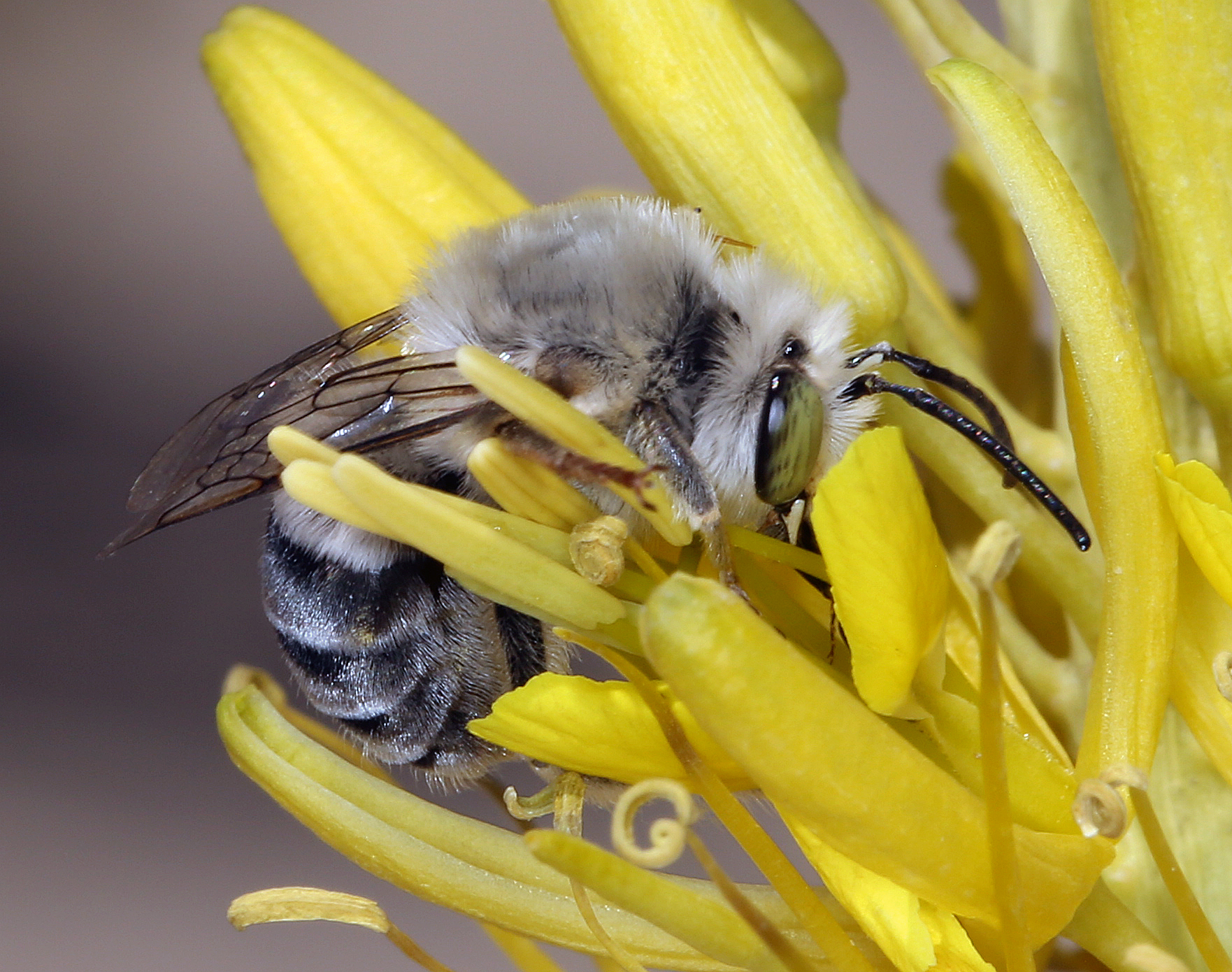
- Habropoda pallida in Death Valley National Park, Inyo County, California, United States of America.

Conservation status
- Vulnerable (NatureServe)

Scientific classification
- Kingdom: Animalia
- Phylum: Arthropoda
- Clade: Pancrustacea
- Class: Insecta
- Order: Hymenoptera
- Family: Apidae
- Genus: Habropoda
- Species: H. pallida

Binomial name
- Habropoda pallida (Timberlake, 1937)

= Habropoda pallida =

Species of bee

Habropoda pallida is a species of anthophorine bee in the family Apidae. It is found in Central America and North America. Females build nests and are particularly likely to provision the young with pollen from Larrea tridentata plants.
