= Wild type =

Phenotype of the typical form of a species as it occurs in nature

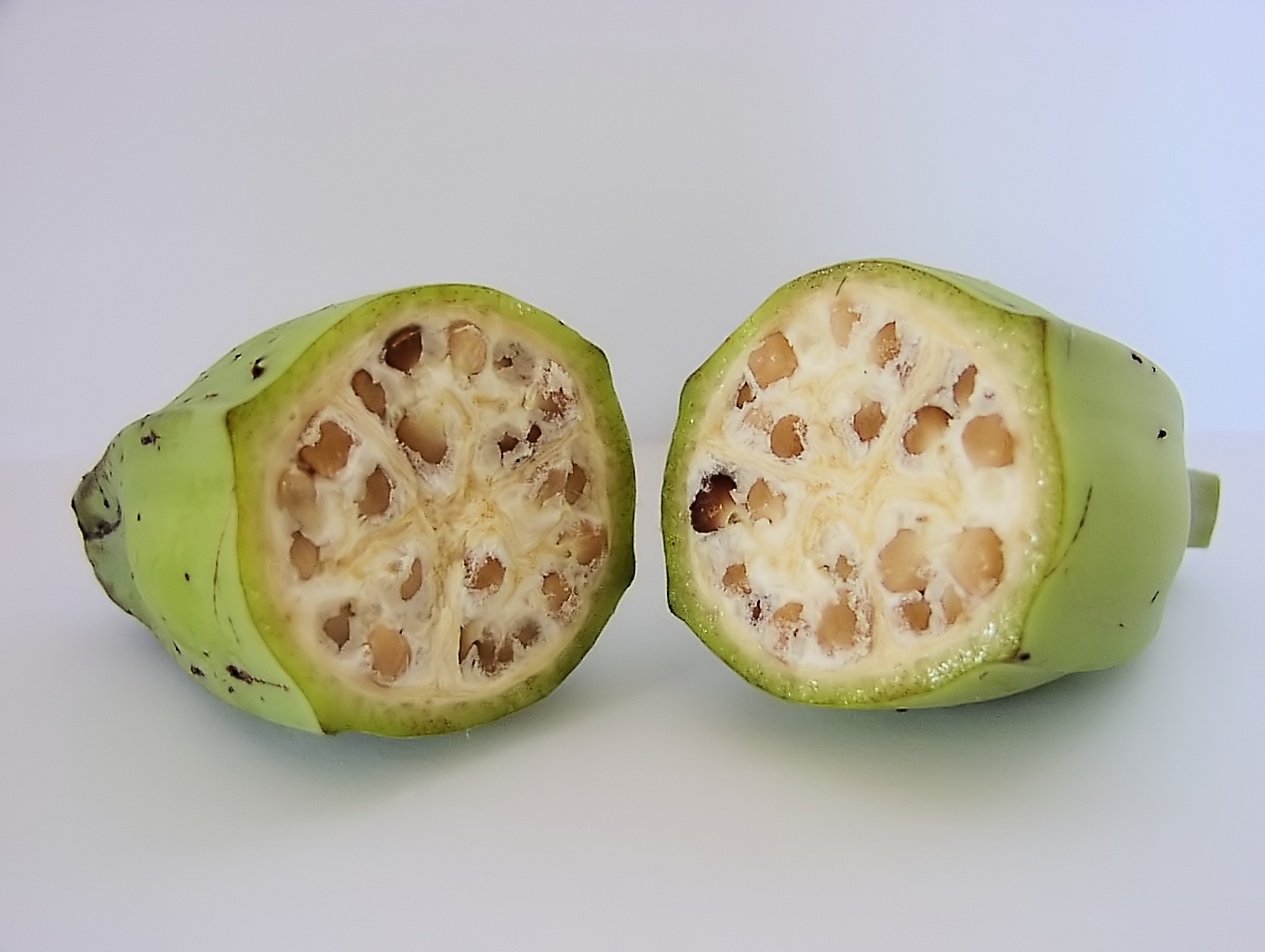
Unlike culinary bananas, wild-type bananas have numerous large, hard seeds.

The wild type (WT) is the phenotype of the typical form of a species as it occurs in nature. Originally, the wild type was conceptualized as a product of the standard "normal" allele at a locus, in contrast to that produced by a non-standard, "mutant" allele. "Mutant" alleles can vary to a great extent, and even become the wild type if a genetic shift occurs within the population. Continued advancements in genetic mapping technologies have created a better understanding of how mutations occur and interact with other genes to alter phenotype. It is now regarded that most or all gene loci exist in a variety of allelic forms, which vary in frequency throughout the geographic range of a species, and that a uniform wild type does not exist. In general, however, the most prevalent allele – i.e., the one with the highest gene frequency – is the one deemed wild type.

The concept of wild type is useful in some experimental organisms such as fruit flies Drosophila melanogaster, in which the standard phenotypes for features such as eye color or wing shape are altered by particular mutations that produce distinctive phenotypes, such as "white eyes" or "vestigial wings". Wild-type alleles are indicated with a "+" superscript, for example w^{+} and vg^{+} for red eyes and full-size wings, respectively. Manipulation of the genes behind these traits led to the current understanding of how organisms form and how traits mutate within a population. Research involving the manipulation of wild-type alleles has application in many fields, including fighting disease and commercial food production.

== Medical applications ==
The genetic sequence for wild-type versus "mutant" phenotypes and how these genes interact in expression is the subject of much research. Better understanding of these processes is hoped to bring about methods for preventing and curing diseases that are currently incurable such as infection with the herpes virus. One example of such promising research in these fields was the study done examining the link between wild-type mutations and certain types of lung cancer. Research is also being done dealing with the manipulation of certain wild-type traits in viruses to develop new vaccines. This research may lead to new ways to combat deadly viruses such as the Ebola virus and HIV. Research using wild-type mutations is also being done to establish how viruses transition between species to identify harmful viruses with the potential to infect humans.

== Commercial applications ==
Selective breeding to enhance the most beneficial traits is the structure upon which agriculture is built, this expedited the evolution process to make crop plants and animals larger and more disease resistant. Genetic manipulation went further. Genetic alteration of plants leads to not only larger crop production, but also more nutritious products, allowing isolated populations to receive vital vitamins and minerals that would otherwise be unavailable to them. Utilization of these wild-type mutations has also led to plants capable of growing in extremely arid environments, making more of the planet habitable than ever before. As more is understood about these genes, agriculture will continue to become a more efficient process, which will be relied upon to sustain a continually growing population. Amplification of advantageous genes allows the best traits in a population to be present at much higher percentages than normal, although this practice has been the subject of some ethical debate. These changes have also been the reason behind certain plants and animals being almost unrecognizable when compared to their ancestral lines.

== See also ==
- Genotype
- Phenotype
- Crop wild relative
