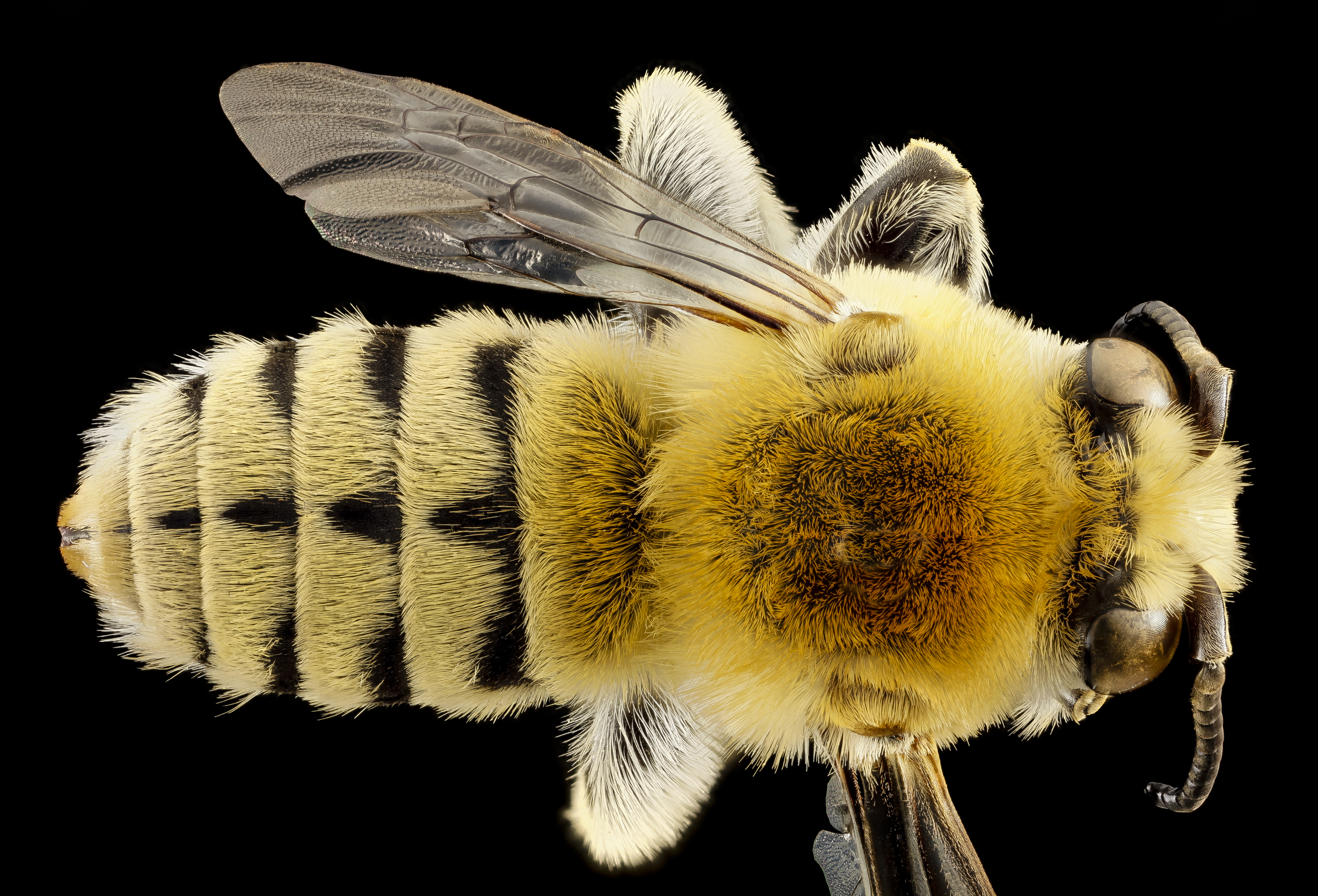

Scientific classification
- Kingdom: Animalia
- Phylum: Arthropoda
- Clade: Pancrustacea
- Class: Insecta
- Order: Hymenoptera
- Family: Apidae
- Tribe: Anthophorini
- Genus: Habropoda; Smith, 1854

= Habropoda =

Genus of bees

Habropoda is a genus of anthophorine bees in the family Apidae. There are at least 50 described species in Habropoda.

== Species ==
- Habropoda annae Schwarz & Gusenleitner, 2001
- Habropoda apostasia Lieftinck, 1974
- Habropoda bucconis (Friese, 1911)
- Habropoda bucconoides Wu, 1991
- Habropoda christineae Dubitzky, 2007
- Habropoda cineraria (Smith, 1879)
- Habropoda citula (Cockerell, 1929)
- Habropoda cressonii (Dalla Torre, 1896)
- Habropoda dammersi (Timberlake, 1937)
- Habropoda deiopea (Cameron, 1897)
- Habropoda depressa Fowler, 1899
- Habropoda disconota Lieftinck, 1974
- Habropoda eurycephala Wu, 1991
- Habropoda excellens (Timberlake, 1962)
- Habropoda ezonata Smith, 1854
- Habropoda hainanensis Wu, 1991
- Habropoda hakkariensis Schwarz & Gusenleitner, 2001
- Habropoda hookeri Cockerell, 1920
- Habropoda imitatrix Lieftinck, 1974
- Habropoda krishna Bingham, 1908
- Habropoda laboriosa (Fabricius, 1804)
- Habropoda medogensis Wu, 1988
- Habropoda mimetica Cockerell, 1927
- Habropoda miserabilis (Cresson, 1878)
- Habropoda moesta Popov, 1952
- Habropoda morrisoni (Cresson, 1878)
- Habropoda murihirta (Cockerell, 1905)
- Habropoda omeiensis Wu, 1979
- Habropoda oraniensis (Lepeletier, 1841)
- Habropoda orbifrons Lieftinck, 1974
- Habropoda pallida (Timberlake, 1937)
- Habropoda pekinensis Cockerell, 1911
- Habropoda pierwolae Tran, Nguyen & Ascher, 2025
- Habropoda pelmata Lieftinck, 1974
- Habropoda plantifera Lieftinck, 1974
- Habropoda radoszkowskii (Dalla Torre, 1896)
- Habropoda rowlandi (Meade-Waldo, 1914)
- Habropoda rufipes Wu, 1983
- Habropoda salviae (Michener, 1936)
- Habropoda salviarum Cockerell, 1898
- Habropoda schafelneri Schwarz & Gusenleitner, 2001
- Habropoda semifulva (Cockerell, 1905)
- Habropoda sichuanensis Wu, 1986
- Habropoda sinensis Alfken, 1937
- Habropoda sutepensis Cockerell, 1929
- Habropoda tadzhica Popov, 1948
- Habropoda tainanicola (Strand, 1913)
- Habropoda tarsata (Spinola, 1838)
- Habropoda tristissima (Cockerell, 1904)
- Habropoda tumidifrons Lieftinck, 1974
- Habropoda turneri Cockerell, 1909
- Habropoda ventiscopula Wu, 1984
- Habropoda vierecki (Cockerell, 1909)
- Habropoda xizangensis Wu, 1979
- Habropoda yunnanensis Wu, 1983
- Habropoda zonatula Smith, 1854
