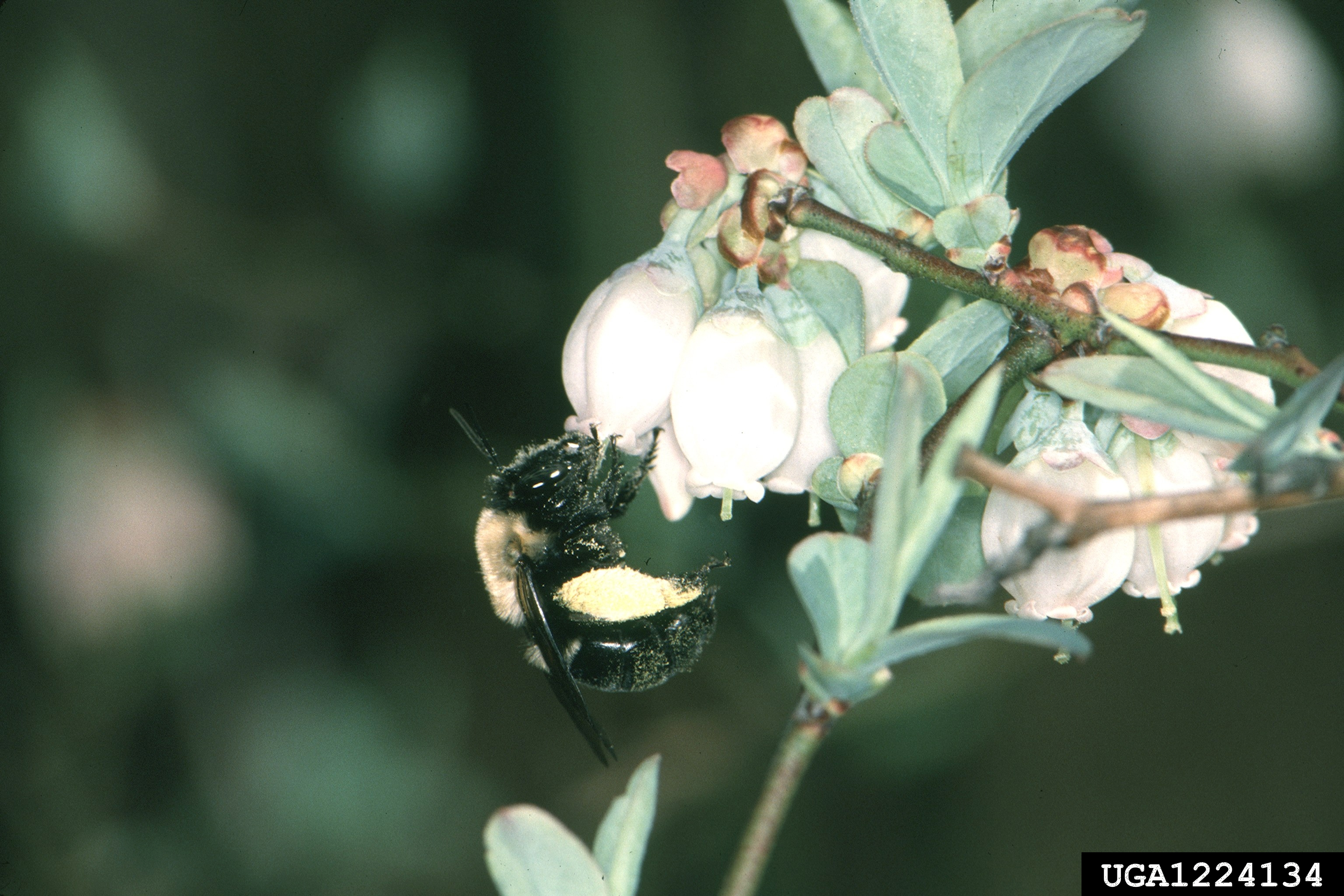

Scientific classification
- Kingdom: Animalia
- Phylum: Arthropoda
- Clade: Pancrustacea
- Class: Insecta
- Order: Hymenoptera
- Family: Apidae
- Genus: Habropoda
- Species: H. laboriosa

Binomial name
- Habropoda laboriosa (Fabricius, 1804)

= Habropoda laboriosa =

Species of bee

Habropoda laboriosa, the southeastern blueberry bee, is a bee in the family Apidae. It is native to the eastern United States. It is regarded as the most efficient pollinator of southern rabbit-eye blueberries, because the flowers require buzz pollination, and H. laboriosa is one of the few bees that exhibit this behavior. It is active for only a few weeks of the year, while the blueberries are in flower during early spring, when the temperature is warm and humid. H. laboriosa are solitary bees that live alone but nest in close proximity with other nests of their species. They have similar features to bumblebees, but are smaller in size compared to them.

== Taxonomy ==
The southeastern blueberry bee was classified by Fabricius in 1804. Southeastern blueberry bees are considered mountain-digger bees which can be characterized into the genus Habropoda; the major plant that it pollinates are blueberry plants (Vaccinium), so the species name, laboriosa, is derived from that characteristic.

== Description ==
H. laboriosa are solitary bees but may be in close proximity to other nests. They dig tunnels in the ground that are a little wider than their bodies, and they may do so in the company of their own species. Usually, they choose spots where there is direct sunlight and low chances of flooding. Since they are solitary bees, the mother bee only provides food and nutrients to her own brood. Blueberry bees are only active 3-5 weeks of the year and only produce one generation of offspring per year.

They often resemble bumblebees, but are smaller in size. There are differences in body size between females and males of the species. Females range from the lengths of 15.5 mm to 16 mm, whereas males are 13 mm to 14 mm in length. Females have a completely black head; in contrast, males are black but with a yellow clypeus.

== Body plan and anatomy ==
H. laboriosa is composed of three major segments. The head contains the sensory organs that include the antennae, eyes, mouth, and other internal structures that help respond to their surroundings. The thorax contains the muscles and wings that help it travel and allow it to fly. They have two pairs of wings and three pairs of legs. Each pair of legs has a special function, so they are able to adapt and be versatile. On one pair of legs, there are claws at the end that help them latch on to rough surfaces such as tree trunks. Another pair of legs have arolia, which are soft pads that allow bees to walk on smooth surfaces such as grass and flower pedals. On the tibia of the hind leg, there is a corbicula, which can be referred to as a pollen basket that is concave to allow it carry pollen grains while in flight. There are two sets of flight muscles that the bee uses to navigate through flight, and they are referred to as the longitudinal and vertical flight muscles. The abdomen contains the wax scales, digestive tract, reproductive system and the sting.

Bees also have an exoskeleton which is composed of chitin that helps protect the internal organs, provide structure, and stops the organism from losing water or desiccation. This is possible because of the waxy layer the bee has that keeps the water from leaving their bodies. This exoskeleton also prevents the bees from growing continuously. In order for bees to grow, they need to shed or molt their exoskeleton. Bees in the larval stages shed their exoskeleton and increases in size periodically. However, bees in the adult stage stay the same size and do not grow any bigger.

== Habitat ==
H. laboriosa is native to the eastern United States and are found in warm, humid conditions. They are often found nesting 33cm to 71cm in the ground, in moderately dry and sandy soils in eastern United States, ranging from Illinois to the New England states, south to Mississippi and Florida. They are solitary ground nesting bees, and they prefer soil that is covered by leaf litter with low moisture, so there would be a lack of roots near their nests to keep the soil relatively dry. Under these leaf litters are hidden burrows which connects to tunnels that can be 20cm long leading to their nests. If a nest has been invaded or disturbed by other organisms, often the bees will abandon it to find a new area nest. For example, it is common for ant species such as Iridomyrmex humilis to invade open nesting sites which results in nest abandonment. Another instance where H. laboriosa abandon their nests is when cleptoparasitic bees in the genus Melecta parasitizes these nests with their eggs. These parasitic bees are commonly referred to as Cuckoo bees; they parasitize other bee species by invading their nests to lay their parasitic eggs, so their offspring can thrive off the host's resources (pollen deposits) that are meant for the host's offspring. When H. laboriosa is searching for new areas for potential nesting sites, they prefer areas that have been dug already but uninhabited by other organisms. These nesting sites are usually near blueberry orchards with pits that have been previously plowed.

== Pollination behavior ==
H. laboriosa exhibits a special method of pollination referred to as buzz pollination. They are oligolectic or specialist pollinators to Vaccinium virgatum and Gelsemium sempervirens. They latch onto the anthers of a plant and vibrate their thoracic muscles and their wings at 100 to 500 Hz, which results in the ejection of pollen from the anthers subsequently landing on the bee's body. When the bees visit a different blueberry plant, the pollen on the bee's body will land on the female reproductive organ for fertilization. This behavior is specially tuned for the extraction of pollen in blueberry plants, because blueberry plants require these vibrations to be able to efficiently release their pollen; since blueberry plants have naturally heavy and adherent pollen, it is hard for other pollinators to extract pollen. This makes H. laboriosa an efficient pollinator for blueberry plants. Buzz pollination was discovered in the past 100 years and there is still much research to be done on this topic due to the difficulty in measuring the vibrations in a natural pollination occurrence. H. laboriosa emerge around late February till April and are only active during this time period to pollinate the blueberry plants. This is because blueberry plants only flower and bloom at this time. They have the ability to emerge before the start of spring due to their ability to survive in cooler weather. They are able to vibrate their thoracic muscles for warmth thus allowing them to fly in temperatures as low as 60 degrees Fahrenheit. When they are vibrating their thoracic muscles, human observers describe the sound it produces as "buzzing"; usually, this sound is at a higher pitch during pollination because they are vibrating at a higher frequency then normal flight.They are absent by the time the fruit is ready for harvest, so they are only active for a couple of weeks during the year. Compared to the bumblebee species, the female H. laboriosa are quicker at finding pollen and nectar, and they spend most of the day collecting it when it is in their preferred range of temperatures.

Male and female individual behavior differs when foraging for pollen and nectar. Females have more pollen grains on 4 out of 5 parts of their bodies whereas males often carry a wider species of pollen grains that increases the chances of fertilization in plants.
