= Daucus gracilis =

Conservation status
- Least Concern (IUCN 3.1)

Scientific classification
- Kingdom: Plantae
- Clade: Tracheophytes
- Clade: Angiosperms
- Clade: Eudicots
- Clade: Asterids
- Order: Apiales
- Family: Apiaceae
- Genus: Daucus
- Species: D. gracilis

Binomial name
- Daucus gracilis Steinh.

Species of plant

Daucus gracilis is a widespread species of flowering plant in the family Apiaceae. It is native to Algeria. An annual reaching 40 cm (16 in), it is typically found in rocky soils at elevations from 0 to 655 m (0 to 2,150 ft). It is a crop wild relative of carrot, and has been assessed as Least Concern.
