= Habropoda tristissima =

Conservation status
- Vulnerable (NatureServe)

Scientific classification
- Kingdom: Animalia
- Phylum: Arthropoda
- Class: Insecta
- Order: Hymenoptera
- Family: Apidae
- Tribe: Anthophorini
- Genus: Habropoda
- Species: H. tristissima

Binomial name
- Habropoda tristissima (Cockerell, 1904)

Species of bee

Habropoda tristissima is a species of anthophorine bee in the family Apidae. It is found in Central America and North America.
