= Pisum =

Genus of legumes

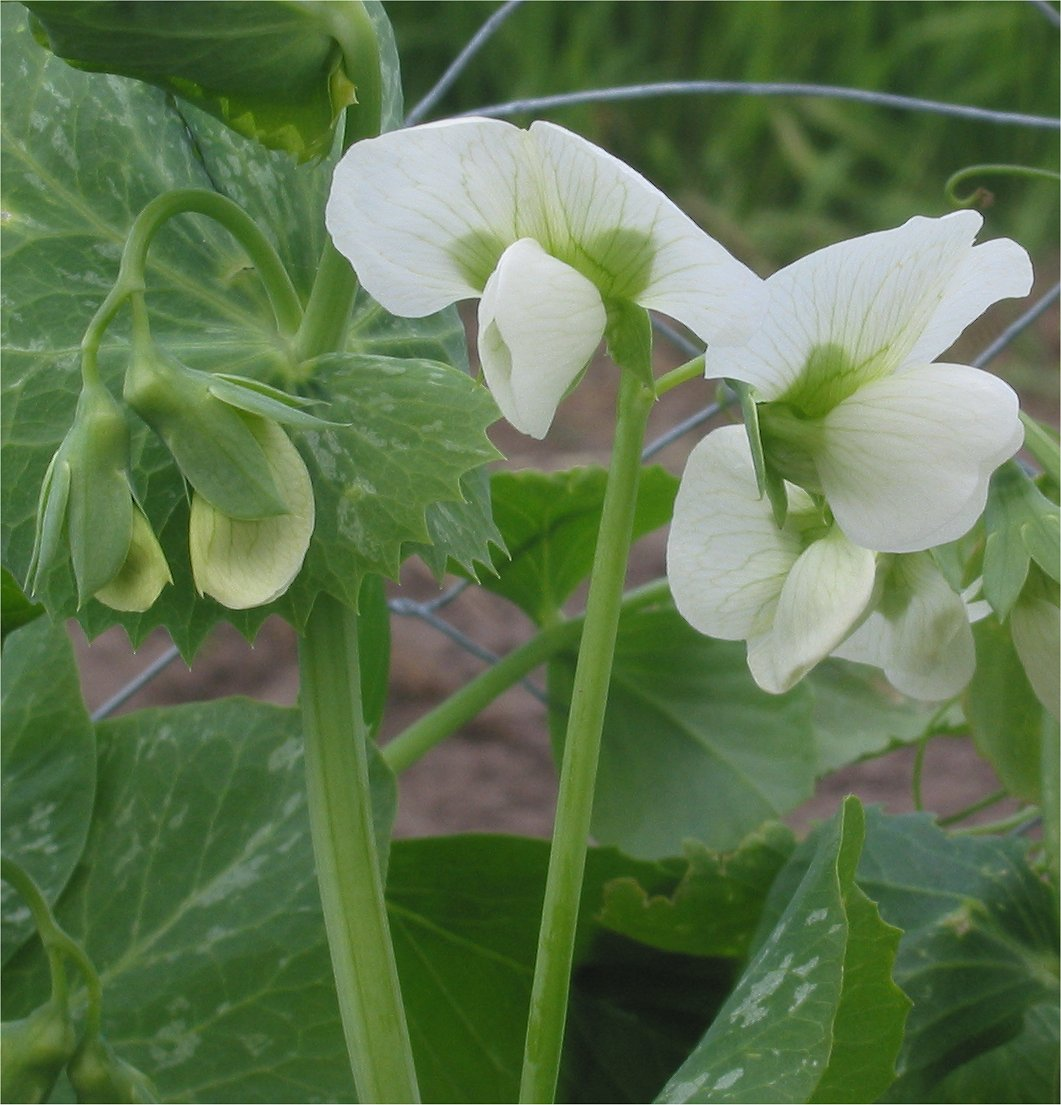
Pisum sativum or Lathyrus oleraceus

Pisum is a possible genus of flowering plants in the family Fabaceae, native to southwest Asia and northeast Africa. As of April 2026, Plants of the World Online considered the genus to be a synonym of Lathyrus, while the International Legume Database Information Service (ILDIS) accepted three species:

- Pisum abyssinicum (syn. P. sativum subsp. abyssinicum) = Lathyrus oleraceus
- Pisum fulvum = Lathyrus fulvus
- Pisum sativum = Lathyrus oleraceus – the field or garden pea, a major human food crop

== Taxonomy ==
The genus Pisum was erected by Carl Linnaeus in 1753. Pisum is the ancient Latin name for the pea. Molecular phylogenetic studies suggested that Pisum was not distinct from Lathyrus, and sank it into that genus. Others have disputed the justification and hence the necessity for this change.
