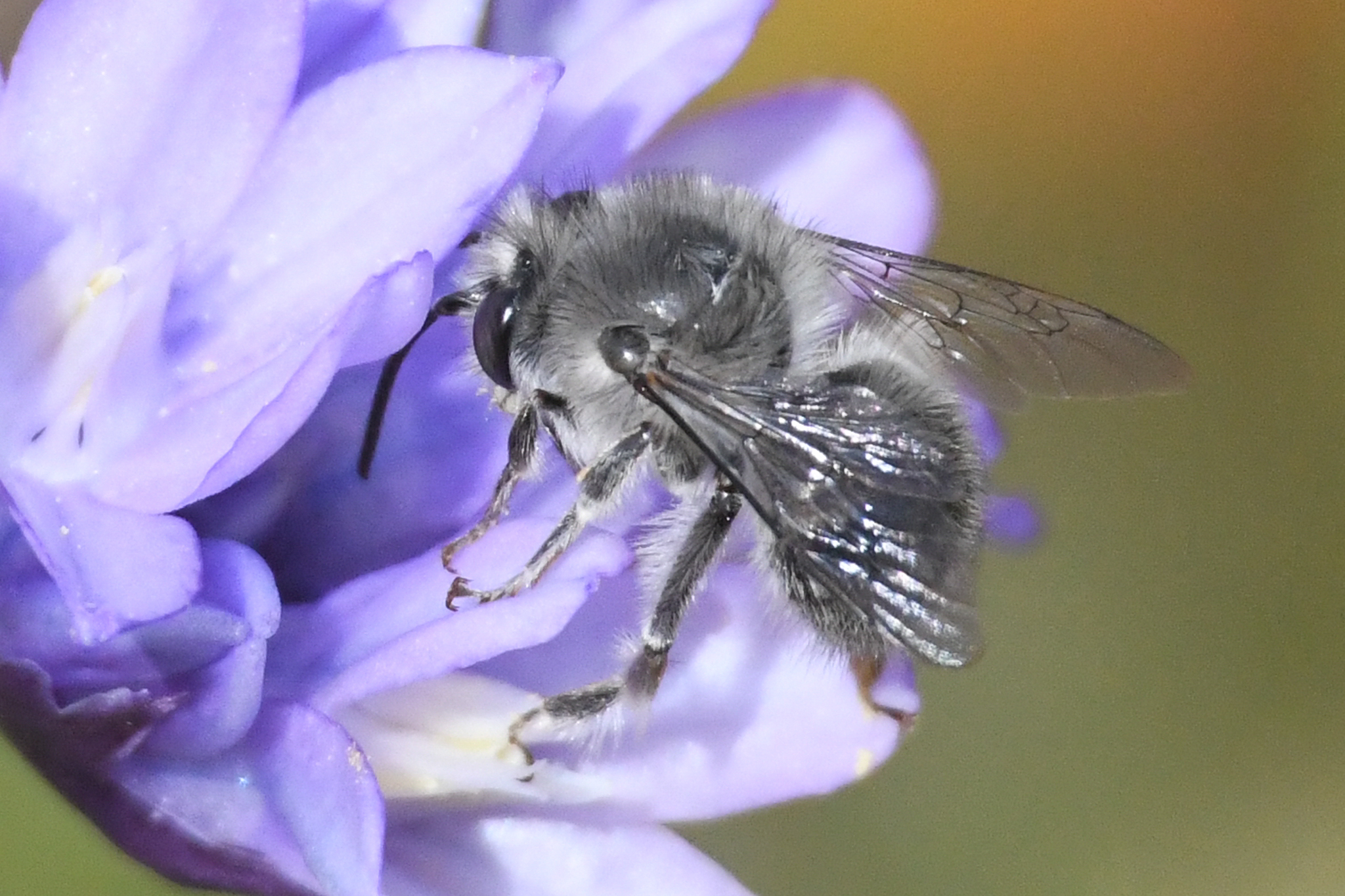

Scientific classification
- Domain: Eukaryota
- Kingdom: Animalia
- Phylum: Arthropoda
- Class: Insecta
- Order: Hymenoptera
- Family: Apidae
- Genus: Habropoda
- Species: H. depressa

Binomial name
- Habropoda depressa Fowler, 1899

= Habropoda depressa =

Species of bee

Habropoda depressa is a species of anthophorine bee in the family Apidae. It is found in North America. It nests in hard-packed soils.
