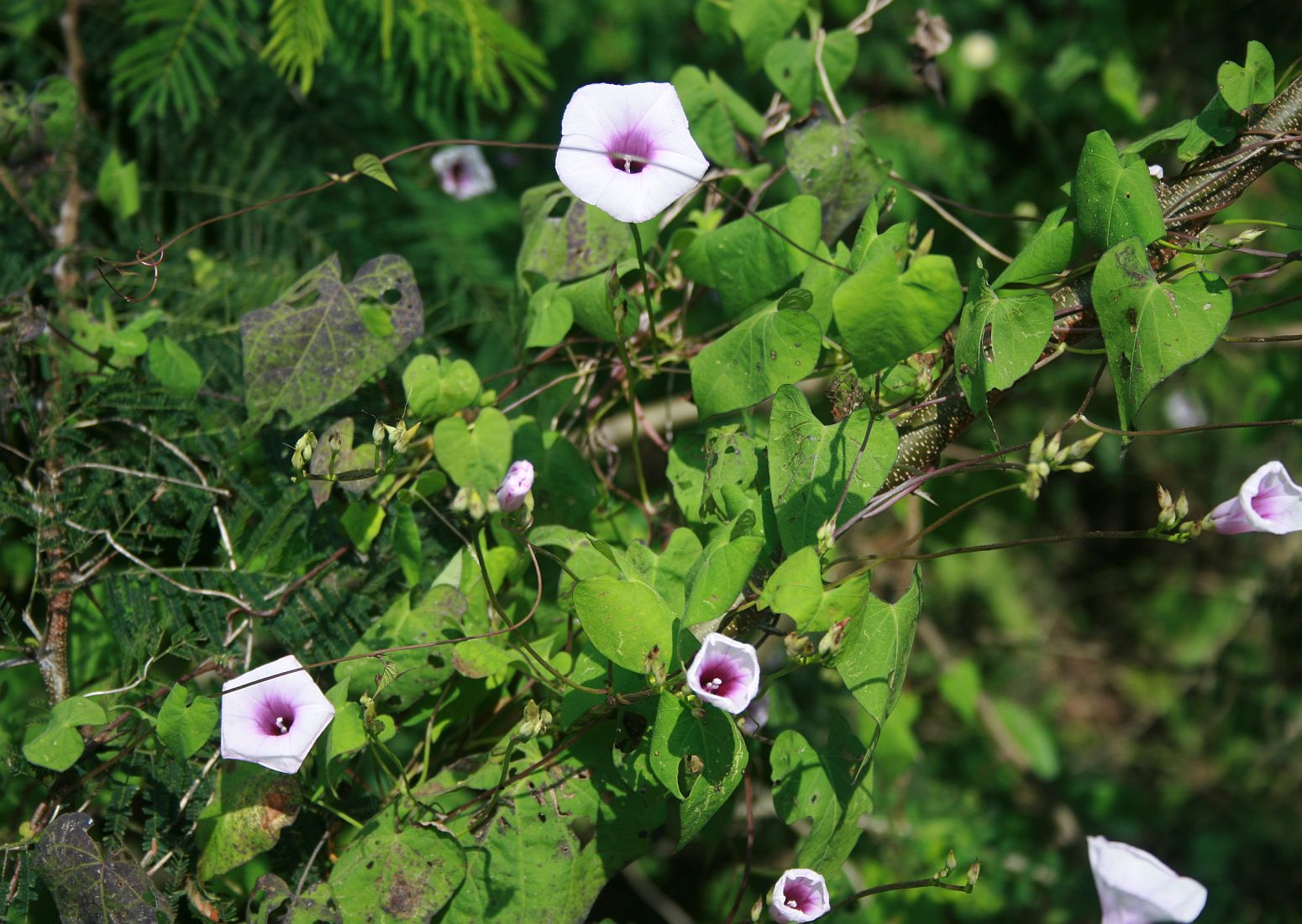

Scientific classification
- Kingdom: Plantae
- Clade: Tracheophytes
- Clade: Angiosperms
- Clade: Eudicots
- Clade: Asterids
- Order: Solanales
- Family: Convolvulaceae
- Genus: Ipomoea
- Species: I. trifida

Binomial name
- Ipomoea trifida (Kunth) G. Don

Synonyms
- Convolvulus trifidus (Kunth) G. Don; Convolvulus hepaticifolius (Willd. ex Roem. & Schult.); Ipomoea confertiflora (Standl.); Ipomoea cordatotriloba var. torreyana (Gray) D.F. Austin

= Ipomoea trifida =

Species of plant

Ipomoea trifida, the threefork morning glory, is a species of flowering plant in the family Convolvulaceae. It is native to the Caribbean, Mexico, and South America. I. trifida is known for being the closest living wild relative to I. batatas, or the common sweet potato, and is believed to have split from this relative at least 800,000 years ago. The roots of this plant are thin and inedible, while the flowers tend to be purple.
