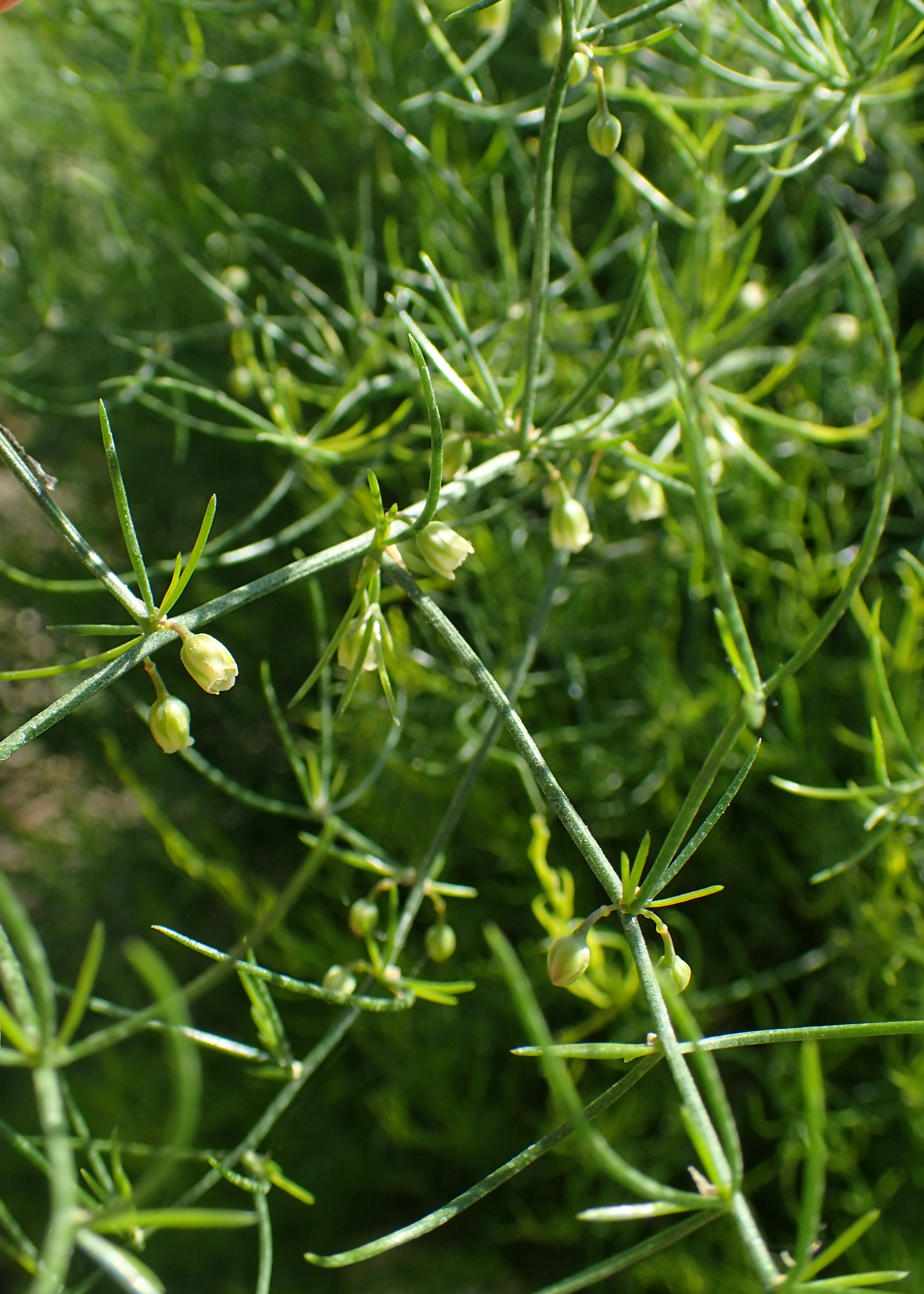
- Flowers
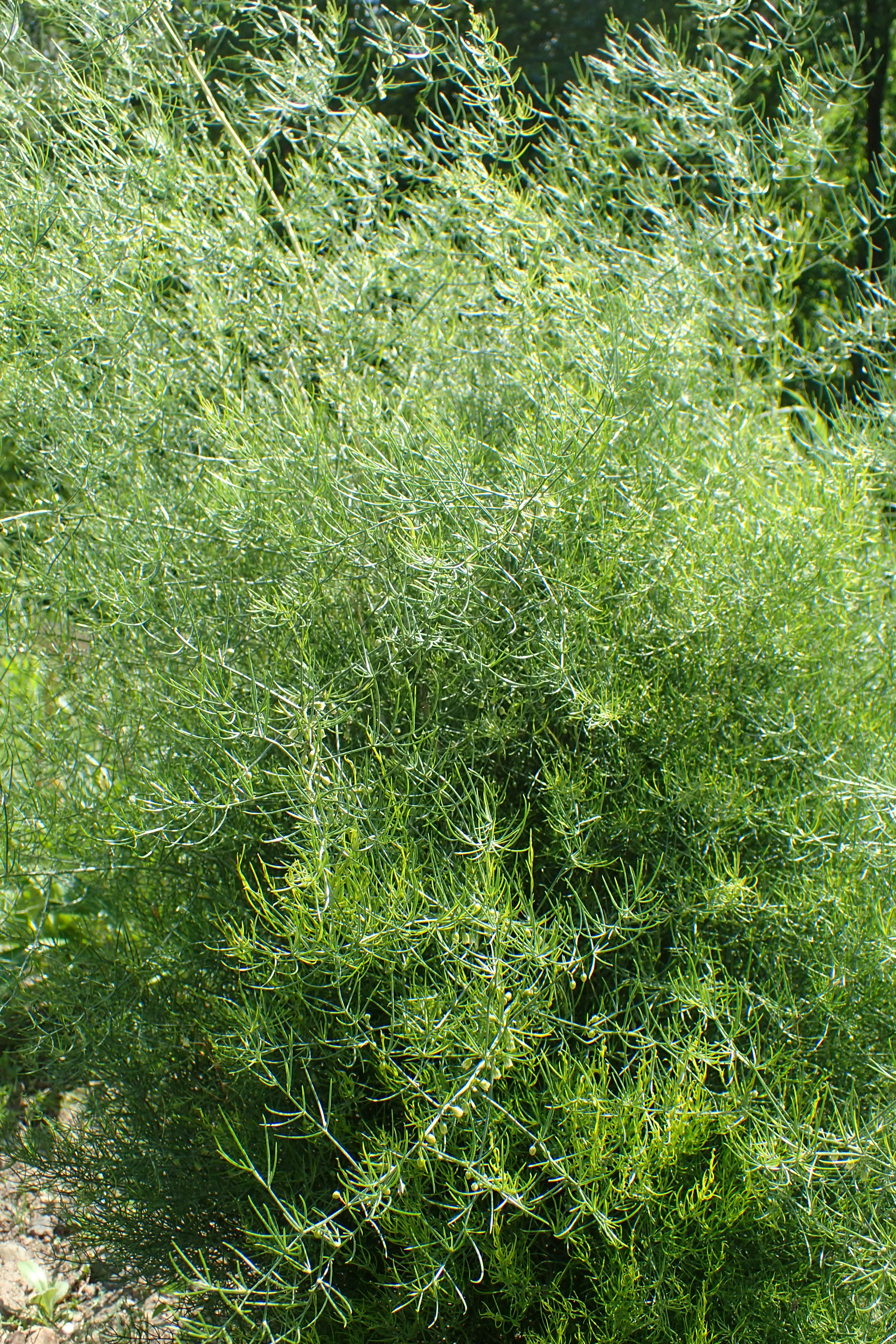
- Habit

Scientific classification
- Kingdom: Plantae
- Clade: Tracheophytes
- Clade: Angiosperms
- Clade: Monocots
- Order: Asparagales
- Family: Asparagaceae
- Subfamily: Asparagoideae
- Genus: Asparagus
- Species: A. dauricus

Binomial name
- Asparagus dauricus Fisch. ex Link

Synonyms
- Asparagus burjaticus var. baicalensis N.V.Vlassova; Asparagus gibbus Bunge; Asparagus gibbus var. baicalensis (N.V.Vlassova) N.V.Vlassova; Asparagus glycycarpus Kunth; Asparagus officinalis var. gracilis Ledeb.; Asparagus tuberculatus Bunge ex Iljin

= Asparagus dauricus =

Species of plant

Asparagus dauricus is a species of flowering plant in the family Asparagaceae. It is native to southeastern Siberia, Mongolia, Manchuria, northern and eastern China, and Korea. A perennial herb reaching 70 cm (28 in), it is typically found on arid slopes or sandy wastelands, at elevations from 0 to 2,200 m (0 to 7,200 ft).
