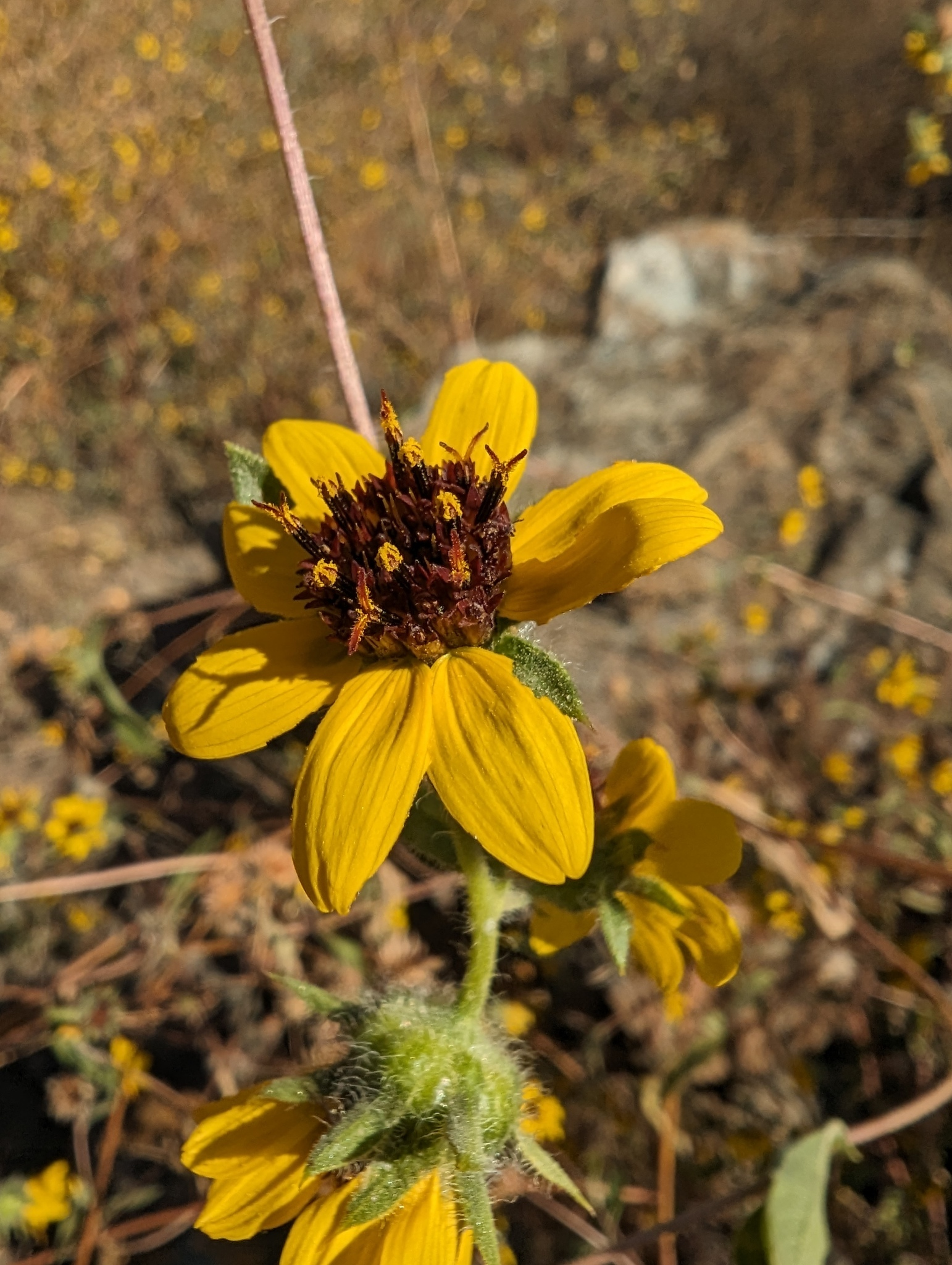

Conservation status
- Near Threatened (IUCN 3.1)

Scientific classification
- Kingdom: Plantae
- Clade: Embryophytes
- Clade: Tracheophytes
- Clade: Angiosperms
- Clade: Eudicots
- Clade: Asterids
- Order: Asterales
- Family: Asteraceae
- Tribe: Heliantheae
- Genus: Helianthus
- Species: H. exilis

Binomial name
- Helianthus exilis A.Gray

= Helianthus exilis =

Species of sunflower

Helianthus exilis is a species of sunflower known by the common name serpentine sunflower. It is endemic to northern California (from Siskiyou County south to Napa County, Nevada County, and Santa Clara County), where it grows mainly in mountainous areas, often in serpentine soils.

Helianthus exilis is an erect annual reaching heights over a meter (40 inches)). It has a hairy, rough stem with leaves lance- or oval-shaped, usually pointed, sometimes serrated along the edges, and 3 to 15 centimeters (1.2-6.0 inches) long. The inflorescence holds one or more flower heads, and each plant may have many inflorescences growing along the full length of the stem. The flower head has a cup of long, pointed phyllaries holding an array of bright yellow ray florets each one to two centimeters (0.4-0.8 inches) long around a center of yellow to dark purple or reddish disc florets. The achene is 3 to 5 millimeters (0.12-0.20 inches) long.
