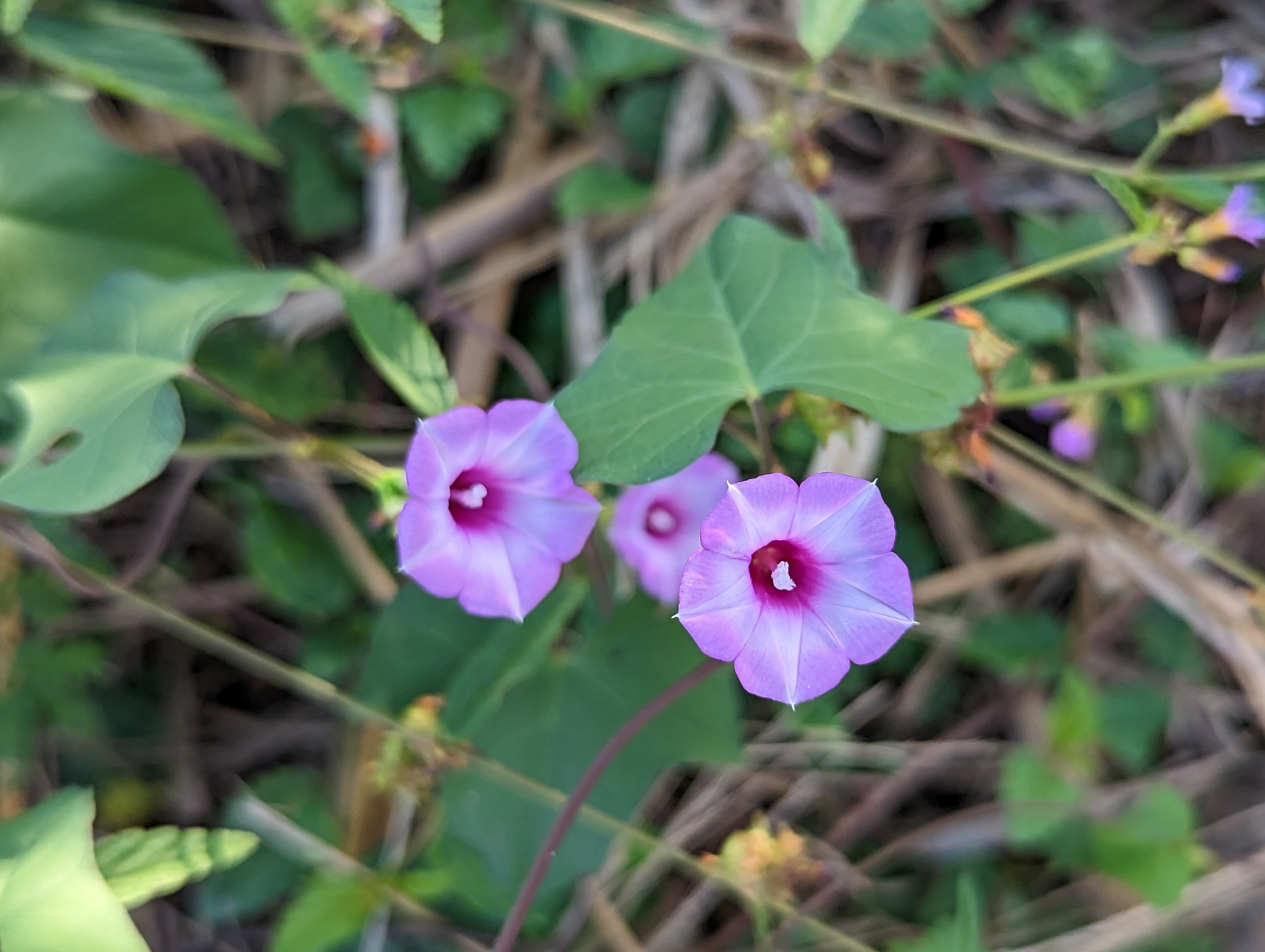
- Ipomoea triloba on Culebra, Puerto Rico

Scientific classification
- Kingdom: Plantae
- Clade: Tracheophytes
- Clade: Angiosperms
- Clade: Eudicots
- Clade: Asterids
- Order: Solanales
- Family: Convolvulaceae
- Genus: Ipomoea
- Species: I. triloba

Binomial name
- Ipomoea triloba L.

Synonyms
- Batatas triloba (Linnaeus) Choisy; Convolvulus trilobus (Linnaeus) Desrousseaux; Ipomoea blancoi Choisy

= Ipomoea triloba =

Species of flowering plant

Ipomoea triloba is a species of Ipomoea morning glory known by several common names, including littlebell and Aiea morning glory. It is native to the tropical Americas, but it is widespread in warm areas of the world, where it is an introduced species and often a noxious weed. This is a fast-growing, vining, annual herb producing long, thin stems with ivy-like, petioled, heart-shaped leaves 2.5–6 centimeters (0.98–2.36 in) long. The leaves sometimes, but not always, have three lobes. The vines produce tubular bell-shaped flowers, each about two centimeters long. They are quite variable in color, in shades of pink, red or lavender, with or without white markings.
