= Allium roylei =

Scientific classification
- Kingdom: Plantae
- Clade: Tracheophytes
- Clade: Angiosperms
- Clade: Monocots
- Order: Asparagales
- Family: Amaryllidaceae
- Subfamily: Allioideae
- Genus: Allium
- Subgenus: A. subg. Polyprason
- Species: A. roylei

Binomial name
- Allium roylei Stearn

Species of plant

Allium roylei is a plant species found high in the Himalayas of Pakistan, Afghanistan and India. It has an egg-shaped bulb up to 30 mm across, and a scape up to 40 cm tall. Umbel is hemispherical, with reddish flowers.
