= Vicia lenticula =

Scientific classification
- Kingdom: Plantae
- Clade: Tracheophytes
- Clade: Angiosperms
- Clade: Eudicots
- Clade: Rosids
- Order: Fabales
- Family: Fabaceae
- Subfamily: Faboideae
- Genus: Vicia
- Species: V. lenticula

Binomial name
- Vicia lenticula (Hoppe) Janka

Synonyms
- List: Cicer ervoides Brign.; Cicer punctatum Steud.; Cicer soloniense Schrank ex G.Don; Ervum diphyllum Besser; Ervum ervoides (Brign.) Hayek; Ervum hohenackeri Fisch. & C.A.Mey.; Ervum lenticula Hoppe; Ervum lenticula var. leuocarpum Eig; Ervum lenticulosum St.-Lag.; Ervum pendulum Roth; Ervum uniflorum Ten.; Lathyrus lenticula (Hoppe) Peterm.; Lens ervoides (Brign.) Grande; Lens ervoides var. aristata (K.Malý) Czefr.; Lens ervoides var. leiocarpa (Eig) Zohary; Lens hohenackeri Webb & Berthel.; Lens lenticula (Hoppe) Webb & Berthel.; Lens lenticula var. aristata K.Malý; Lens lenticula var. macrocalycina Maire; Lens nigricans var. uniflora (Ten.) Alef.; Lens uniflora Schur; Vicia lens subsp. ervoides (Brign.) H.Schaef., Coulot & Rabaute

Species of plant

Vicia lenticula, the dwarf lentil, is a species of flowering plant in the family Fabaceae. Some authorities continue to accept it under its synonym Lens ervoides. It is native to the Mediterranean region, the Caucasus, Ethiopia, and central tropical Africa, and it has been introduced to Crimea. An annual or perennial of the subtropics, it is typically found in rocky areas, and is often found growing as a weed in cultivated fields. Local peoples collect its seeds in the wild for food.
