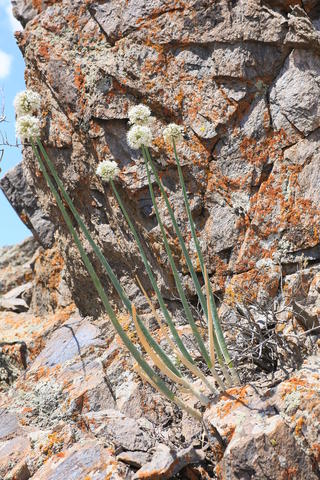

Scientific classification
- Kingdom: Plantae
- Clade: Tracheophytes
- Clade: Angiosperms
- Clade: Monocots
- Order: Asparagales
- Family: Amaryllidaceae
- Subfamily: Allioideae
- Genus: Allium
- Subgenus: A. subg. Cepa
- Species: A. galanthum

Binomial name
- Allium galanthum Kar. & Kir.

Synonyms
- Allium pseudocepa Schrenk.

= Allium galanthum =

Snowdrop onion

Species of flowering plant

Allium galanthum is an Asian species of onion in the amaryllis family, commonly called the snowdrop onion. It is native to Xinjiang, Mongolia, Altay Krai, and Kazakhstan. It grows at elevations of 500–1,500 m (1,600–4,900 ft).

Allium galanthum forms a cluster of bulbs, each up to 3 cm (1.2 in) in diameter. Scapes are up to 60 cm (24 in) tall. Leaves are tubular, about half as long as the scapes. Umbels are spherical with a large number of white flowers.

Allium galanthum is edible and reportedly has medicinal uses.
