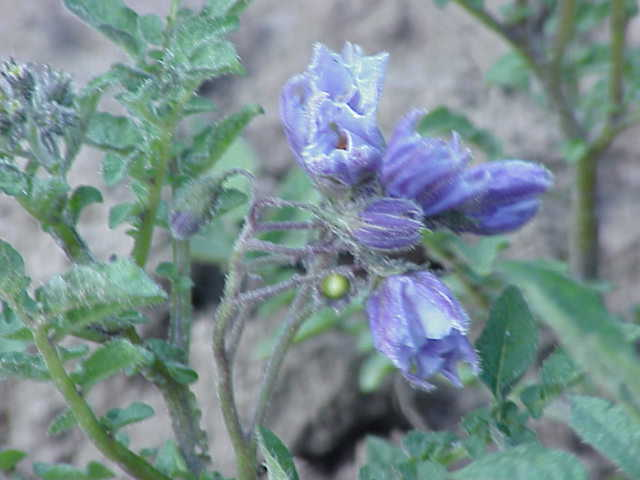

Scientific classification
- Kingdom: Plantae
- Clade: Tracheophytes
- Clade: Angiosperms
- Clade: Eudicots
- Clade: Asterids
- Order: Solanales
- Family: Solanaceae
- Genus: Solanum
- Species: S. chacoense

Binomial name
- Solanum chacoense Bitter

= Solanum chacoense =

Species of flowering plant

Solanum chacoense is a species of wild potato. It is native to South America, where it can be found in Brazil, Bolivia, Argentina, Peru, Uruguay, and Paraguay. It "is one of the most widely distributed wild potato species." It grows as a common weed in disturbed habitat such as crop fields. It can also be found in Australia, China, the United States, England, New Zealand, and elsewhere as an introduced species.

This plant has been extensively researched in the quest to find ways to improve its relative, the cultivated potato (Solanum tuberosum). It is sexually compatible with the common potato. It was likely introduced to regions outside its usual range when it was imported for study and breeding with the potato. Many of the sites where it has been found are next to plant breeding stations and botanical gardens. This wild species contains leptin glycoalkaloids which make it resistant to the Colorado potato beetle (Leptinotarsa decemlineata), a pest of potato crops. It has also shown resistance to verticillium wilt and potato leafroll virus.
