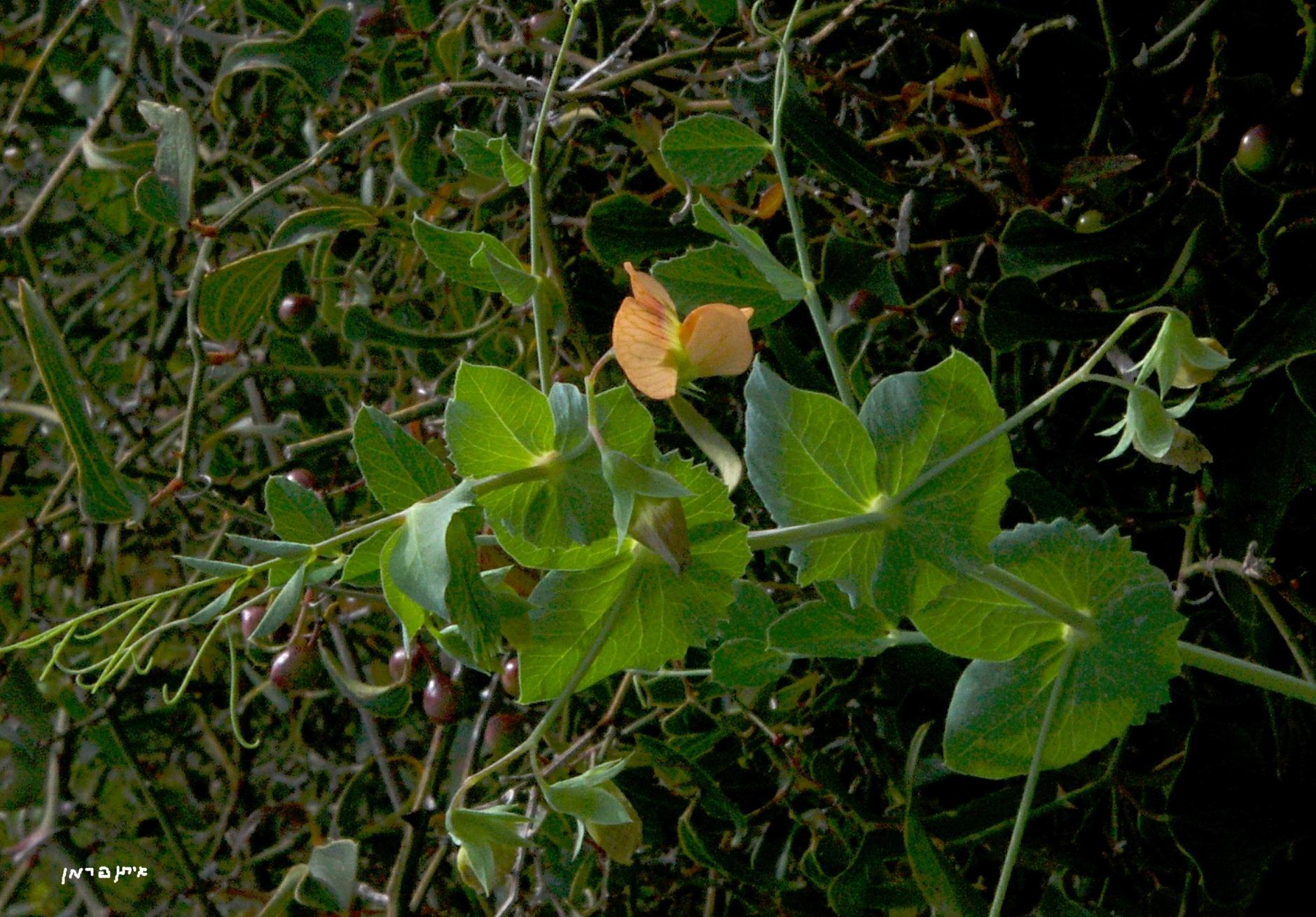
- In Israel

Scientific classification
- Kingdom: Plantae
- Clade: Tracheophytes
- Clade: Angiosperms
- Clade: Eudicots
- Clade: Rosids
- Order: Fabales
- Family: Fabaceae
- Subfamily: Faboideae
- Genus: Lathyrus
- Species: L. fulvus

Binomial name
- Lathyrus fulvus (Sm.) Kosterin

Synonyms
- Pisum fulvum Sm.

= Lathyrus fulvus =

Species of plant

Lathyrus fulvus (many authorities continue to use its synonym Pisum fulvum), the tawny pea, is a species of flowering plant in the family Fabaceae. It is native to the eastern Mediterranean; the eastern Aegean Islands, Turkey, the Levant, and the Sinai Peninsula; and it has been introduced to the US state of Maryland. An annual, it is a crop wild relative of the garden pea Lathyrus oleraceus.
