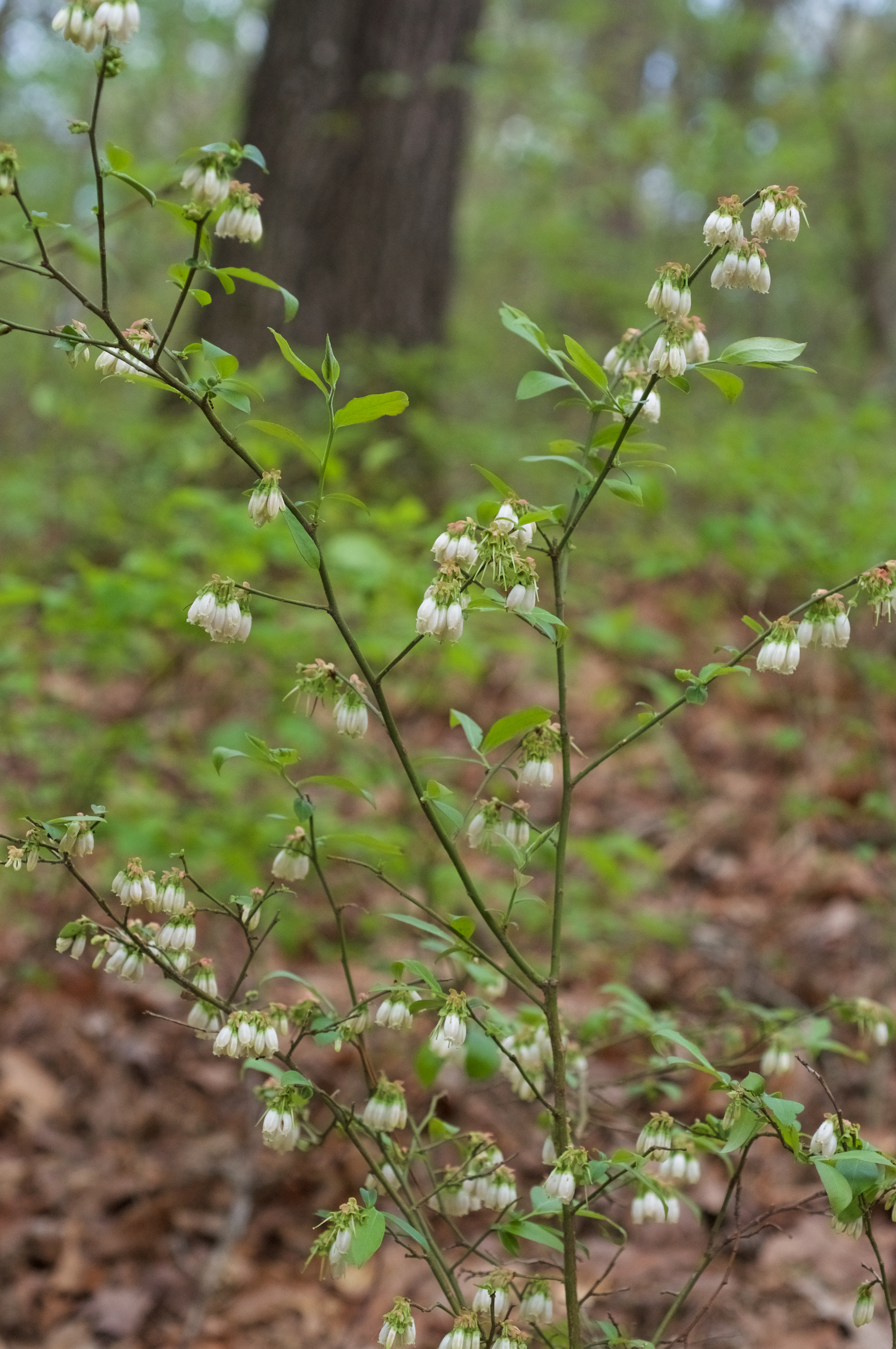

Scientific classification
- Kingdom: Plantae
- Clade: Embryophytes
- Clade: Tracheophytes
- Clade: Spermatophytes
- Clade: Angiosperms
- Clade: Eudicots
- Clade: Asterids
- Order: Ericales
- Family: Ericaceae
- Genus: Vaccinium
- Section: Vaccinium sect. Cyanococcus
- Species: V. virgatum

Binomial name
- Vaccinium virgatum Aiton

Synonyms
- Vaccinium amoenum Aiton; V. ashei J.M.Reade

= Vaccinium virgatum =

Berry and plant

Vaccinium virgatum (commonly known as rabbit-eye blueberry, smallflower blueberry or southern black blueberry) is a species of blueberry native to the Southeastern United States, from North Carolina south to Florida and west to Texas.

== Description ==
Vaccinium virgatum is a deciduous shrub growing to 3 to 6 feet tall and with up to a 3-foot spread. The leaves are spirally arranged, oblate to narrow elliptic, 3 inches long and start red-bronze in the spring only to develop into a dark-green. The flowers are white, bell-shaped, 5 mm long. The fruit is a berry 5 mm diameter, dark blue to black, bloomed pale blue-gray by a thin wax coating. Cytology is 2n = 72.

== Habitat ==
This species has been observed occurring in environments such as deciduous forests, scrub habitats, low wet savannas, and floodplains.

== Pollination ==
Vaccinium virgatum is self-infertile, and must have two or more varieties to pollenize each other. Honeybees are inefficient pollinators, and carpenter bees frequently cut the corollas to rob nectar without pollinating the flowers. V. virgatum does best when pollinated by buzz pollination by bees, such as the native southeastern blueberry bee, Habropoda laboriosa.

== Uses ==
=== Culinary ===
Berries of Vaccinium virgatum are edible and are used as sauces and syrups, and for breads, muffins, pancakes, and pies, and may have pain killing properties (antinociceptive effects).

=== Ornamental ===
Vaccinium virgatum is grown as an ornamental plant, especially for its fall colors, typically bright orange or red.

== Cultivation ==
Vaccinium virgatum grows best on acid soil and is subject to few pests and diseases. Because it is not self-fruitful, two compatible varieties should be planted next to each other to maintain fruiting. If maintained with mulching, it may endure temperatures as low as 10 degrees Fahrenheit. The plants mature to heights from 3 to 6 feet, with a width of up to 3 feet. The plant has few insect or disease problems, however birds and squirrels consume its fruit.

== Ecology ==
Vaccinium virgatum is insect pollinated and is recorded to have been visited in northern Florida by Andrena hilaris, Augochloropsis metallica, Bombus impatiens, Eucera dubitata, Habropoda laboriosa, Lasioglossum reticulatum, and Osmia inspergens. '
