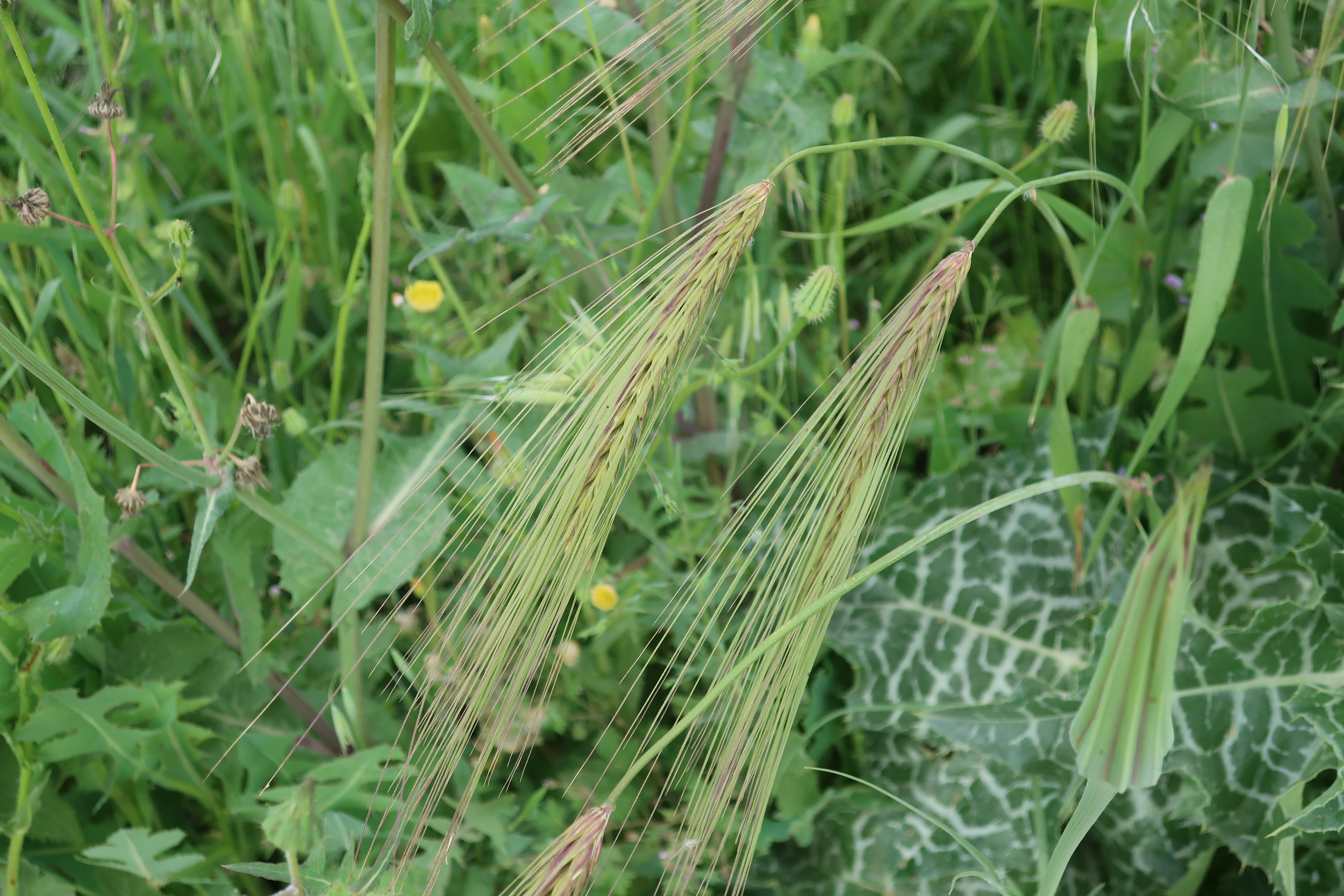

Scientific classification
- Kingdom: Plantae
- Clade: Tracheophytes
- Clade: Angiosperms
- Clade: Monocots
- Clade: Commelinids
- Order: Poales
- Family: Poaceae
- Subfamily: Pooideae
- Genus: Hordeum
- Species: H. spontaneum

Binomial name
- Hordeum spontaneum (K. Koch) Thell.

Synonyms
- Hordeum ithaburense Boiss.; Hordeum vulgare subsp. spontaneum K. Koch

= Hordeum spontaneum =

Wild barley

Species of grass

Hordeum spontaneum, commonly known as wild barley or spontaneous barley, is the wild form of the grass in the family Poaceae that gave rise to the cereal barley (Hordeum vulgare). Domestication is thought to have occurred on two occasions, first about ten thousand years ago in the Fertile Crescent and again later, several thousand kilometres further east.

== Description ==
Wild barley is an annual grass and is very similar in form to cultivated barley (Hordeum vulgare) but has slightly narrower leaves, longer stems, longer awns, a brittle rachis, a longer, more slender seed spike and smaller grains. Characteristics of the wild plant that enhance its survival and dispersal include the brittle rachis (the central part of the seed head), which breaks when the grain is ripe, and the hulled seeds, which are arranged in two rows. In cultivated varieties, the rachis is more durable and the seeds are usually arranged in two or six rows. In the east, barley is usually grown for human consumption and the naked form of the grain is preferred, while in the west, the hulled form is mainly grown. It is used for animal feed and for the production of malt for brewing.

== Distribution and habitat ==
Wild barley is native to North Africa, the Middle East, parts of the Indian subcontinent and south-west China. Its range includes Libya, Egypt, Israel, Lebanon, Jordan, Syria, Crete, Cyprus, Turkey, Iran, Iraq, Afghanistan, Armenia, Azerbaijan, Kyrgyzstan, Turkmenistan, Uzbekistan, Pakistan, India and the Sichuan and Xizang provinces of China.

Wild barley is found in a wide range of locations varying from deserts to Mediterranean-type habitats and highland habitats, growing in both cultivated and uncultivated fields. It is exposed to many environmental stresses including high temperatures, drought and high soil salinity and there are local adaptations to the microclimates in which it grows. This wild plant is potentially a genetic resource useful for the breeding of stress-tolerant varieties of the cultivated crop.

== Domestication ==
The domestication of barley probably occurred around 10,000 years ago in the Israel and Jordan region of the Fertile Crescent. Barley grains have been found at a number of archaeological sites in this area and the wild barleys here are more molecularly similar to the cultivated gene pool than are any other wild populations. AFLP technology indicates single domestication of barley, not, as had previously been hypothesized, a series of domestications in different parts of its range such as in Ethiopia and in the Mediterranean region. Further research using haplotype frequency in different geographic parts of the range led to the inference that there were at least two domestication events, one in the Fertile Crescent and another some 1,500 to 3,000 km (932 to 1,864 mi) further east. The former gave rise to the cultivars grown in Europe and America while the latter gave rise to the diversity of cultivated crops in central Asia and the Far East.

In historical Israel and Palestine, the ground was prepared for the sowing of barley in December, the ground sown with barley in January, and the barley harvested in April.

== Gallery ==
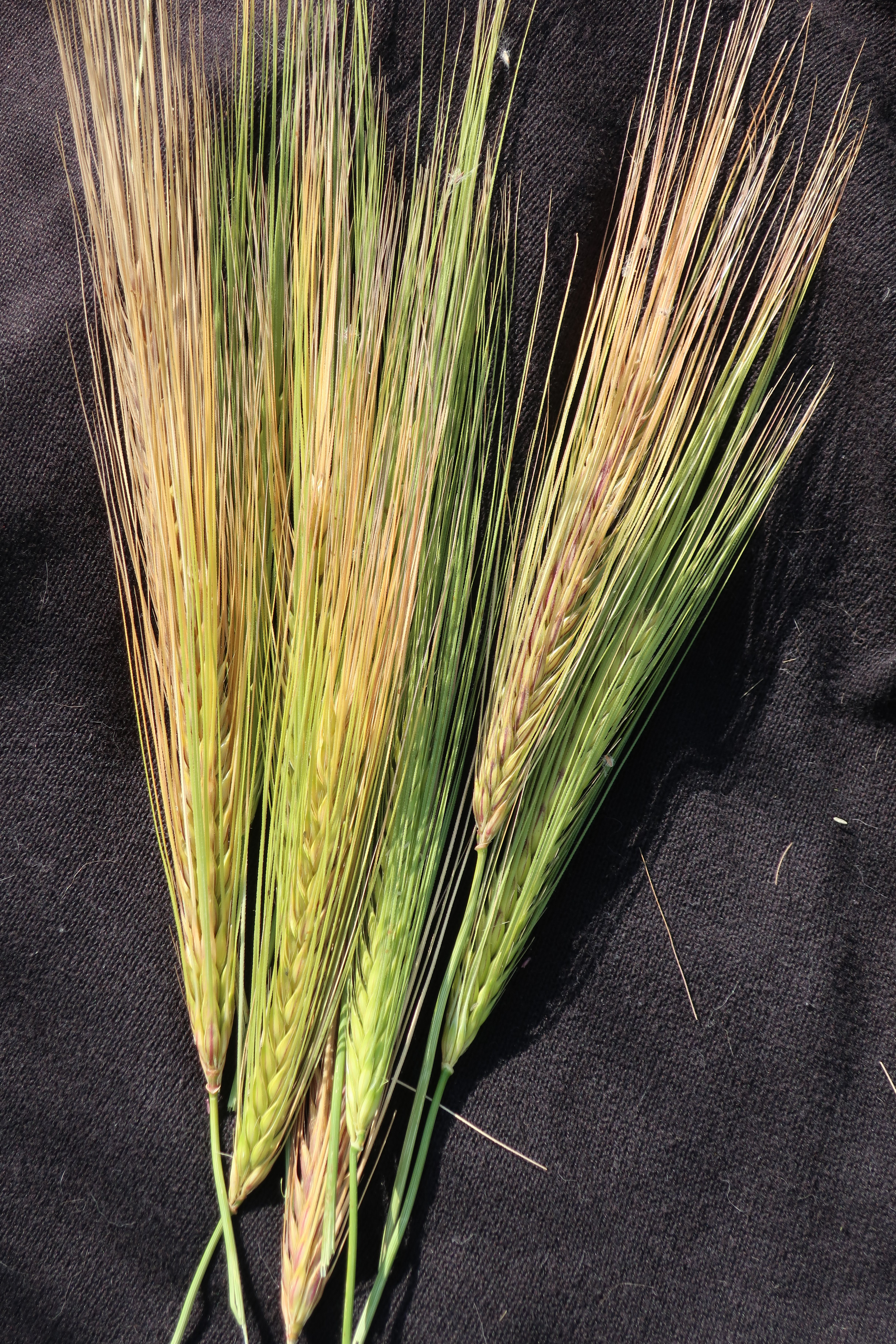
Spikes of wild barley (Hordeum spontaneum)

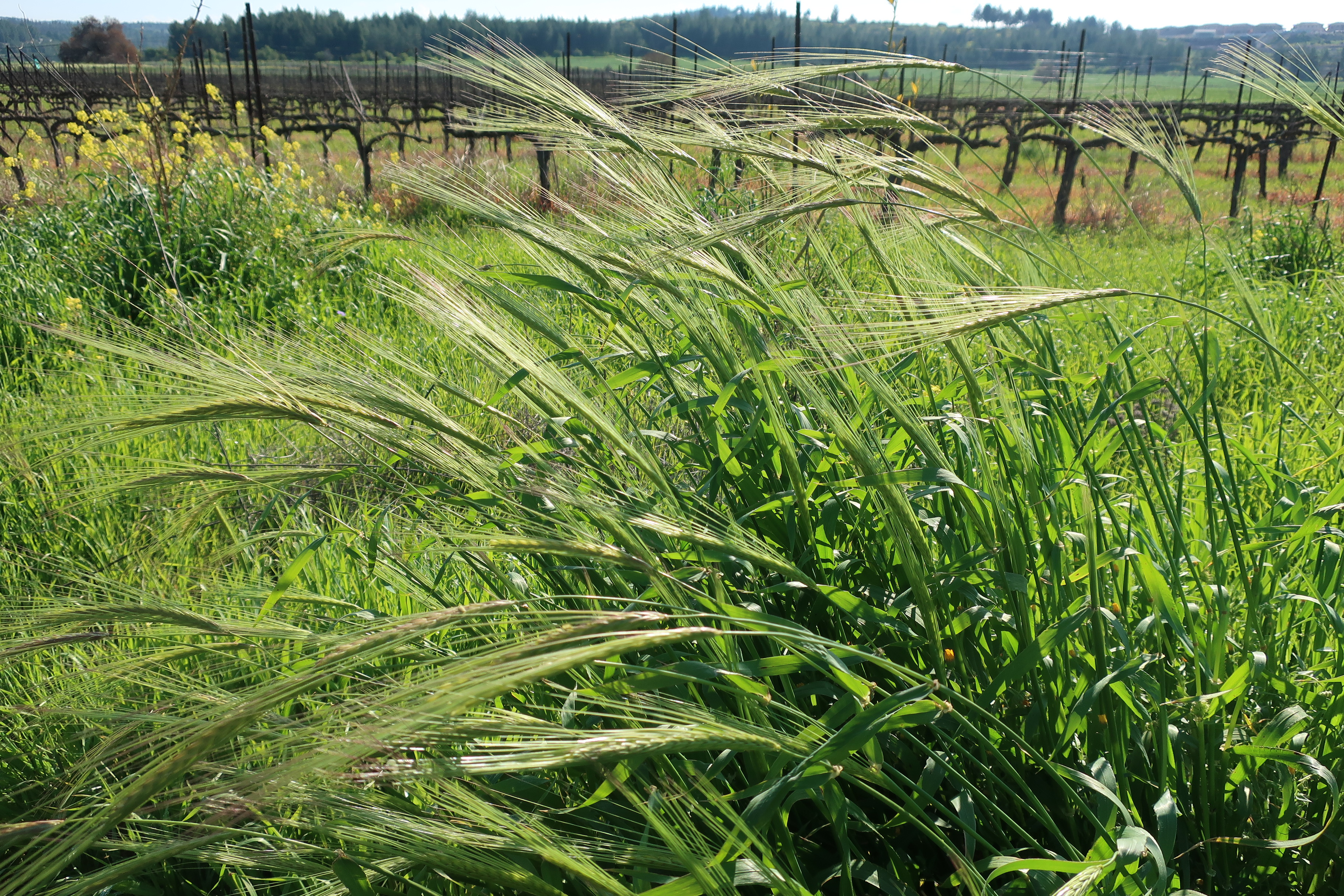
Wild barley swaying in the wind

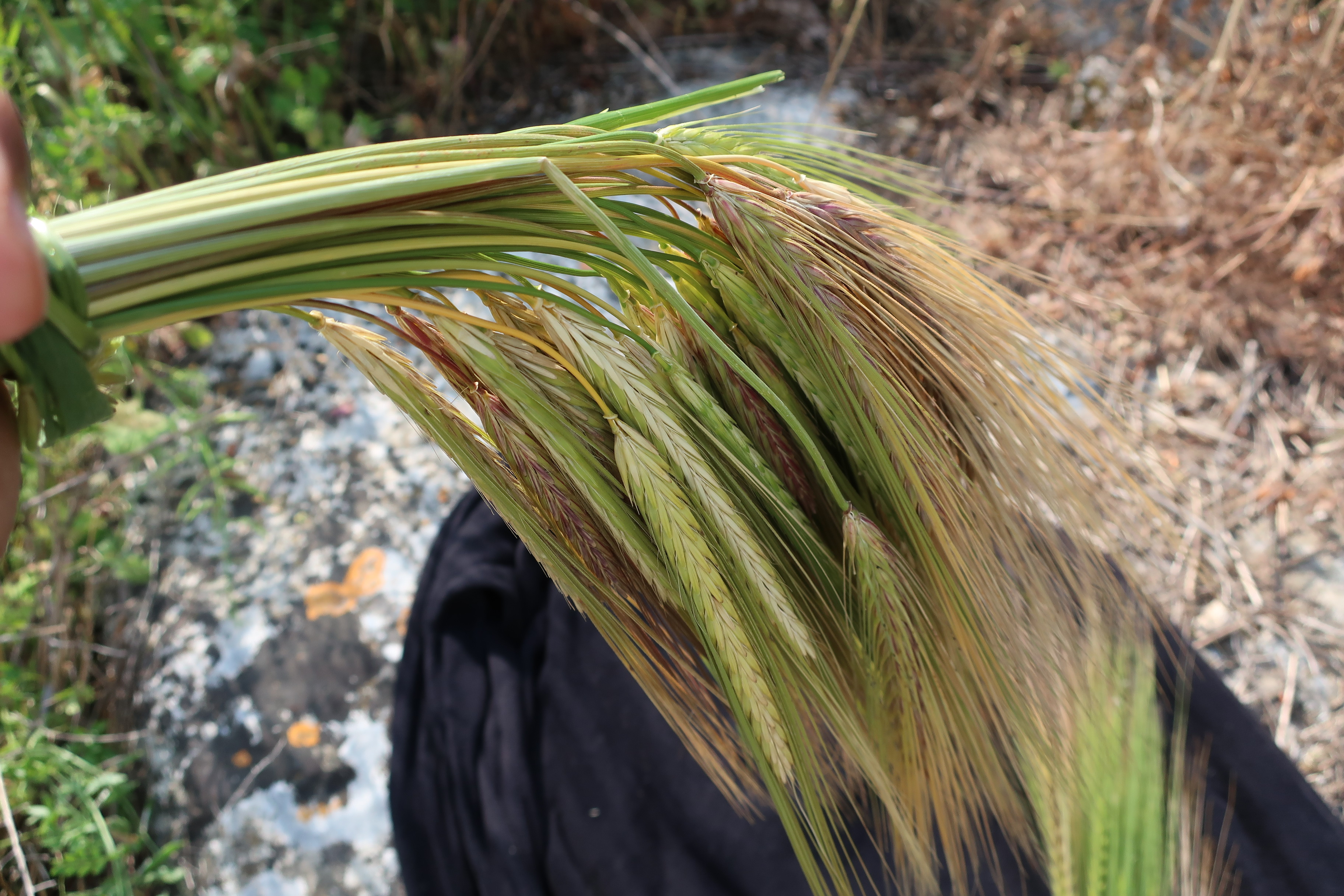
Wild barley (Hordeum spontaneum) harvested in Spring

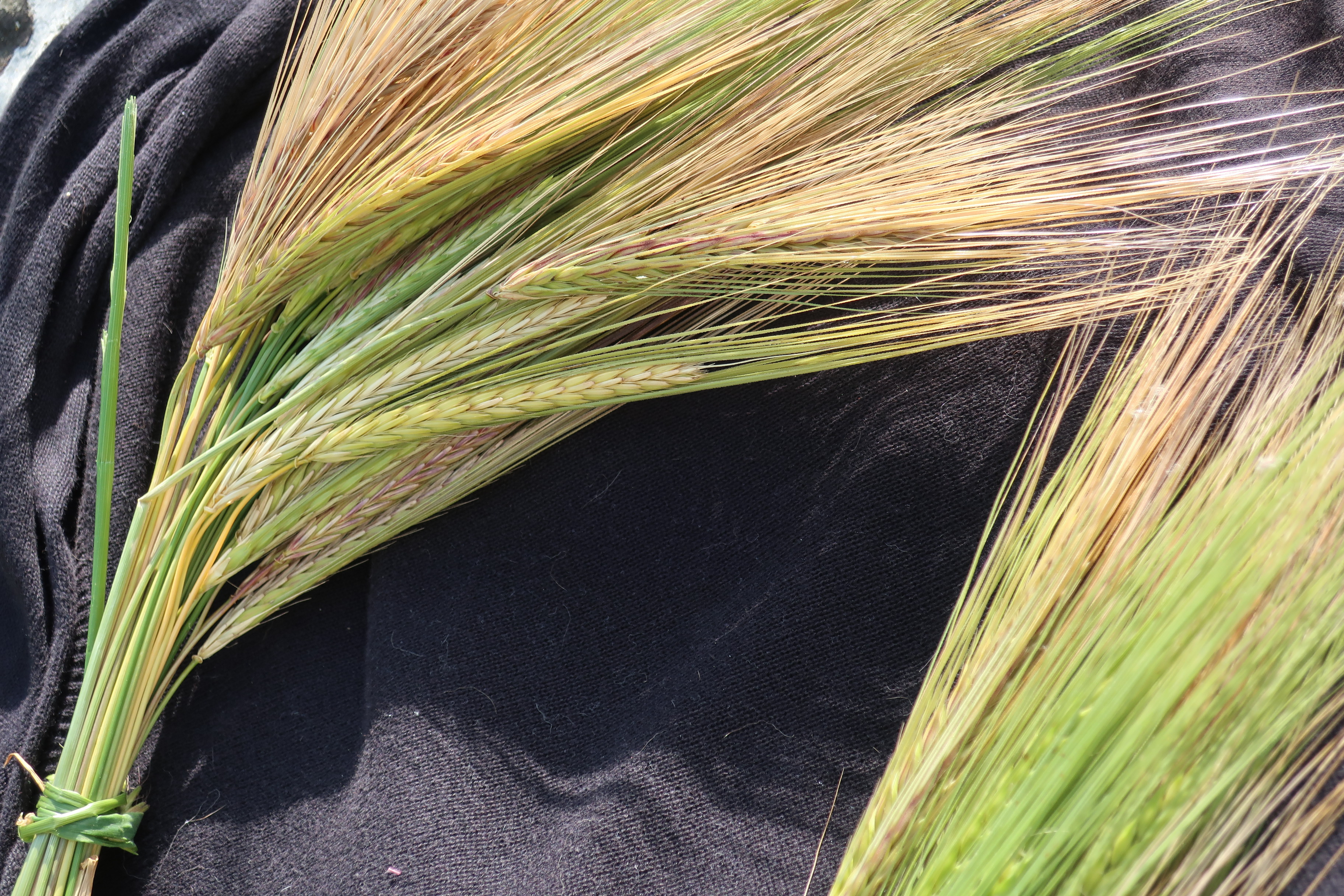
Hordeum spontaneum

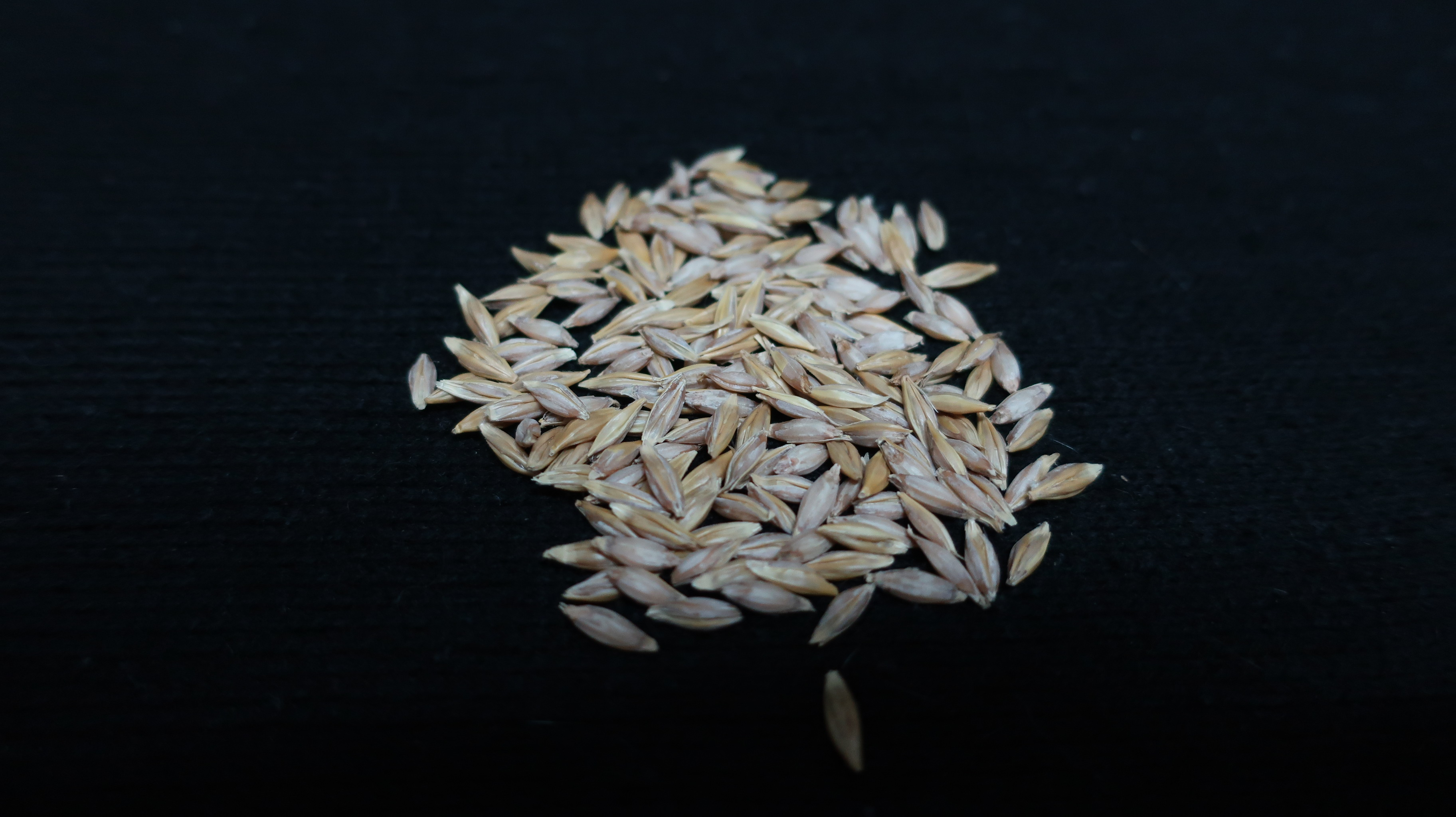
Barley grains
