= Cruciferous vegetables =

Vegetables of the family Brassicaceae

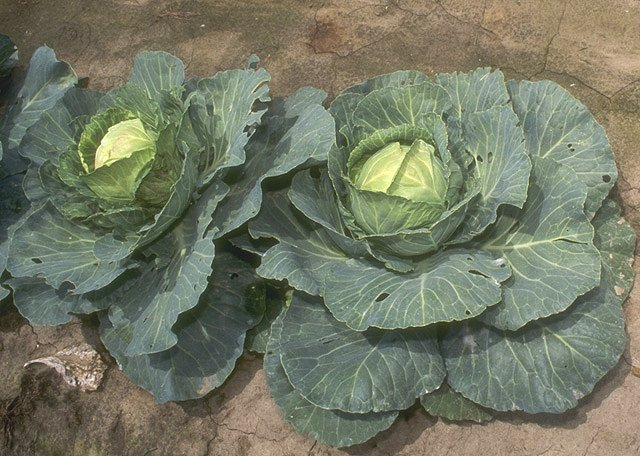
Cabbage plants

Cruciferous vegetables are vegetables of the family Brassicaceae (also called Cruciferae) with many genera, species, and cultivars being raised for food production, such as cauliflower, cabbage, kale, garden cress, bok choy, radish, broccoli, Brussels sprouts, mustard plant and similar green leaf vegetables. The family takes its alternative name (Cruciferae, Neo-Latin for "cross-bearing") from the shape of their flowers, whose four petals resemble a cross.

Ten of the most common cruciferous vegetables eaten by people, known colloquially in North America as cole crops and in the UK, Ireland and Australia as brassicas, are in a single species (Brassica oleracea); they are not distinguished from one another taxonomically, only by horticultural category of cultivar groups. Numerous other genera, and species in the family are also edible.

Cruciferous vegetables are one of the dominant food crops worldwide. They are best grown in temperatures between 15 and 21 °C (59 and 70 °F). They are high in vitamin C and soluble fiber and contain multiple nutrients and phytochemicals.

== List of cruciferous vegetables ==
Extensive selective breeding has produced a large variety of cultivars, especially within the genus Brassica. One description of genetic factors involved in the breeding of Brassica species is the Triangle of U.

The taxonomy of common cruciferous vegetables
Common name	Genus	Specific epithet	Cultivar group
Horseradish	Armoracia	rusticana	
Land cress	Barbarea	verna	
Ethiopian mustard	Brassica	carinata	
Kale	Brassica	oleracea	Acephala group
Collard greens	Brassica	oleracea	Acephala group
Gai lan / jie lan (Chinese broccoli)	Brassica	oleracea	Alboglabra group
Cabbage	Brassica	oleracea	Capitata group
Savoy cabbage	Brassica	oleracea	Savoy Cabbage group
Brussels sprouts	Brassica	oleracea	Gemmifera group
Kohlrabi	Brassica	oleracea	Gongylodes group
Broccoli	Brassica	oleracea	Italica group
Broccolini	Brassica	oleracea	Italica group × Alboglabra group
Broccoflower	Brassica	oleracea	Italica group × Botrytis group
Broccoli romanesco	Brassica	oleracea	Botrytis group / Italica group
Cauliflower	Brassica	oleracea	Botrytis group
Wild broccoli	Brassica	oleracea	Oleracea group
Bok choy (Chinese cabbage)	Brassica	rapa	chinensis
Komatsuna	Brassica	rapa	perviridis or komatsuna
Mizuna	Brassica	rapa	nipposinica
Rapini (broccoli rabe)	Brassica	rapa	parachinensis
Choy sum (flowering cabbage)	Brassica	rapa	parachinensis
Napa cabbage (Chinese cabbage)	Brassica	rapa	pekinensis
Turnip root; greens	Brassica	rapa	rapifera
Rutabaga (swede)	Brassica	napus	napobrassica
Siberian kale	Brassica	napus	pabularia
Canola/rapeseed; oil	Brassica	rapa/napus	oleifera
Head mustard (heart mustard)	Brassica	juncea	rugosa
Brown mustard seeds; mustard greens	Brassica	juncea	
White mustard seeds	Brassica (or Sinapis)	alba	
Black mustard seeds	Brassica (or Rhamphospermum)	nigra	
Tat choy	Brassica	rapa	rosularis
Wild arugula	Diplotaxis	tenuifolia	
Arugula (rocket)	Eruca	vesicaria	
Wasabi	Eutrema	japonicum	
Field pepperweed	Lepidium	campestre	
Maca	Lepidium	meyenii	
Garden cress	Lepidium	sativum	
Watercress	Nasturtium	officinale	
Radish	Raphanus	sativus	
Daikon	Raphanus	sativus	longipinnatus

Further relationships inside the family Brassicaceae can be described by tribes, a grouping of genera (see Brassicaceae § Relationships within the family). Armoracia, Barbarea, and Nasturtium belong to the tribe Cardamineae; Brassica, Sinapis, Diplotaxis, Eruca, and Raphanus belong to Brassiceae; Lepidium belongs in Lepidieae; and finally Wasabia (Eutrema) belongs in Eutremeae.

== Research ==
According to an umbrella review of 41 systematic reviews and meta-analyses of 303 observational studies, there is suggestive evidence for beneficial associations in gastric cancer, lung cancer, endometrial cancer, and all-cause mortality.

=== Cancer ===
Cruciferous vegetables contain glucosinolates, which are under research for their potential for cancer prevention. Glucosinolates are hydrolyzed to isothiocyanates (ITCs) by myrosinase. ITCs are being investigated for their chemopreventive and chemotherapeutic effects.

=== Drug and toxin metabolism ===
Chemicals contained in cruciferous vegetables induce the expression of the liver enzyme CYP1A2.

Alliaceous and cruciferous vegetable consumption may induce glutathione S-transferases, uridine diphosphate-glucuronosyl transferases, and quinone reductases all of which are potentially involved in detoxification of carcinogens such as aflatoxin. High consumption of cruciferous vegetables has potential risk from allergies, interference with drugs such as warfarin, and genotoxicity.

=== Taste ===
People who can taste phenylthiocarbamide (PTC), which is either bitter or tasteless, are less likely to find cruciferous vegetables palatable due to the resemblance between isothiocyanates and PTC.

=== Contraindications ===
Although cruciferous vegetables are generally safe for human consumption, individuals with known allergies or hypersensitivities to a certain Brassica vegetable, or those taking anticoagulant therapy, should be cautious.
