= White rust (disease) =

Plant disease

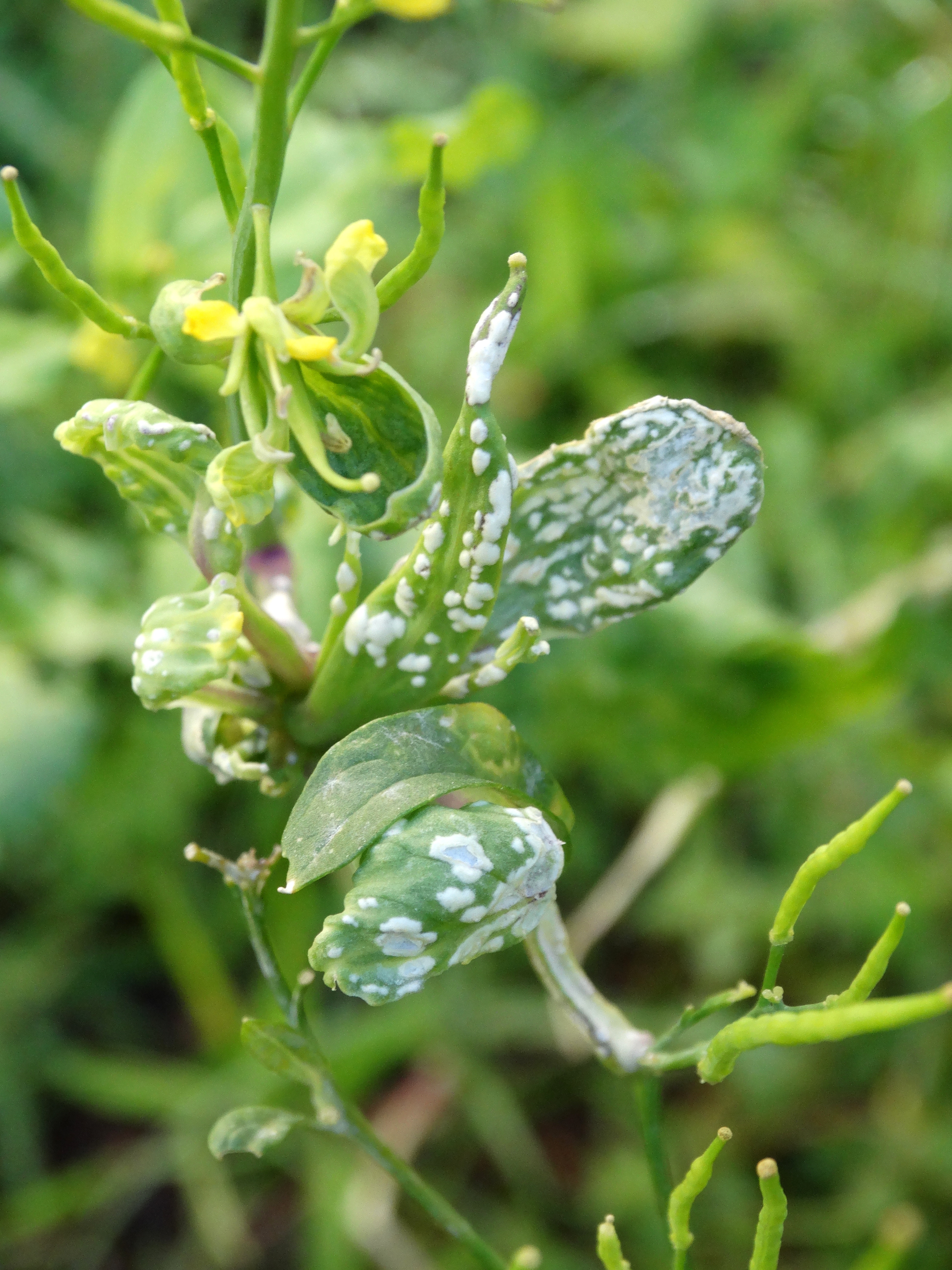

White rust is a disease in plants caused by the oomycete Albugo candida or one of its close relatives. Plants susceptible to this disease generally include members of the Brassica family. White rust has been known to cause agricultural losses in fields cultivating members of this family including broccoli, cauliflower, and Indian mustard. Despite the name, it is not considered a true rust.

== Signs and symptoms ==
Signs and symptoms of infection include chlorosis on leaf surfaces, white blister-like growths on the underside of leaves and on the stems of the plant, and swelling of the roots. In addition, abnormalities in the growth of the host can occur with more serious infections. These abnormalities can include deformation of flowers, twisting or distortion of the plant matter, and sterility.

== Disease proliferation ==
The white blisters contain sporangia; these sporangia are released from these blisters by bursting through the plant tissue. The sporangia, if dispersed to a proper host, can undergo two processes to continue the infection cycle. The first is germination and creation of a germ tube which will penetrate and infect the host through a stoma. Alternatively the sporangia can create and release up to 14 flagellated zoospores. These zoospores travel through films of water to reach a proper site from which to infect the host, at which point they germinate and infect through a stoma. The penetrating hyphae will then grow between the plant cells, producing haustoria to siphon off nutrients from the host. Once established, more sporangia along with sexual oospores, which are used as overwintering survival structures, will be produced.

== Crop damage ==
White rust can cause considerable crop damage in areas that are dependent on the cultivation of members of the Brassica family. For example, India has sustained significant losses in the cultivation of oilseed brassicas. Losses in areas of India have ranged between 17% yield loss and 60% yield loss in the case of mustard seed alone. These yield losses include both amounts of raw material harvestable and negative changes to the nutritional content of the product caused by the disease, making the product less desirable.
