= Dichomeris bolize =

Glaser's dichomeris moth

Scientific classification
- Kingdom: Animalia
- Phylum: Arthropoda
- Clade: Pancrustacea
- Class: Insecta
- Order: Lepidoptera
- Family: Gelechiidae
- Genus: Dichomeris
- Species: D. bolize

Binomial name
- Dichomeris bolize Hodges, 1986

Species of moth

Dichomeris bolize, or Glaser's dichomeris moth, is a moth in the family Gelechiidae. It was described by Ronald W. Hodges in 1986. It is found in the United States, where it has been recorded from Nebraska, Connecticut, Florida, Maryland, Massachusetts, New Jersey, New York, North Carolina and Texas.

Adults are on wing from March to October.

The larvae feed on the flowers of Brassica species.
