= D. brassicae =

D. brassicae may refer to:

- Dasineura brassicae, an agricultural pest insect
- Diplodia brassicae, an anamorphic fungus
- Dothiorella brassicae, a sac fungus
