= Methionine—glyoxylate transaminase =

Methionine-glyoxylate transaminase

Identifiers
- EC no.: 2.6.1.73
- CAS no.: 116155-75-0

Databases
- IntEnz: IntEnz view
- BRENDA: BRENDA entry
- ExPASy: NiceZyme view
- KEGG: KEGG entry
- MetaCyc: metabolic pathway
- PRIAM: profile
- PDB structures: RCSB PDB PDBe PDBsum
- Gene Ontology: AmiGO / QuickGO
Search
- PMC: articles
- PubMed: articles
- NCBI: proteins

Methionine-glyoxylate transaminase (EC 2.6.1.73) is an enzyme that catalyzes the chemical reaction

L-methionine
+
glyoxylic acid
4-(methylthio)-2-oxobutanoic acid
+
glycine

The two substrates of this enzyme characterised from Brassica carinata are L-methionine and glyoxylic acid. Its products are 4-(methylthio)-2-oxobutanoic acid and glycine.

This enzyme is a transferase, specifically a transaminase, which transfer nitrogenous groups. The systematic name of this enzyme class is L-methionine:glyoxylate aminotransferase. Other names in common use include methionine-glyoxylate aminotransferase, and MGAT.
