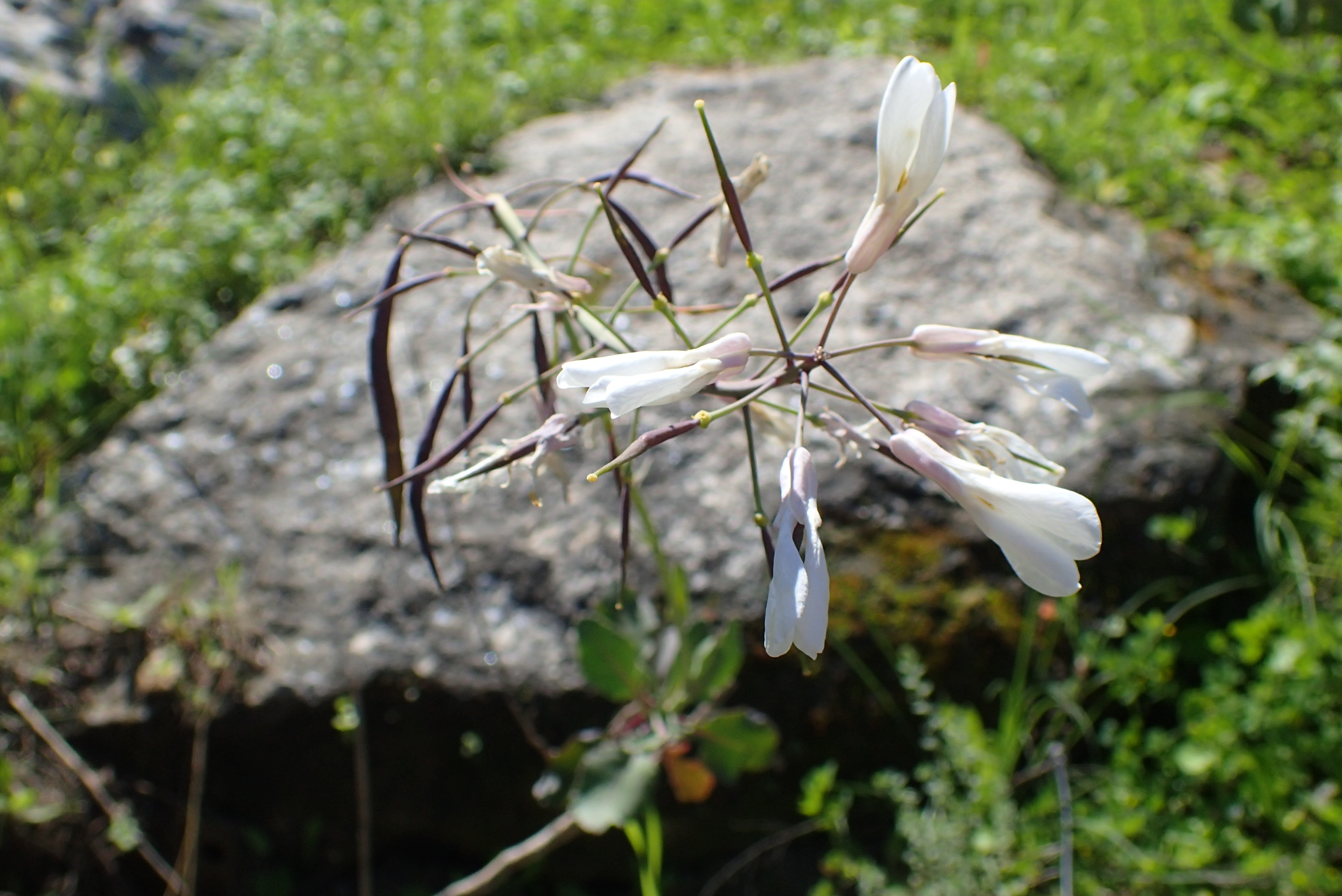

Conservation status
- Endangered (IUCN 3.1)

Scientific classification
- Kingdom: Plantae
- Clade: Tracheophytes
- Clade: Angiosperms
- Clade: Eudicots
- Clade: Rosids
- Order: Brassicales
- Family: Brassicaceae
- Genus: Brassica
- Species: B. hilarionis

Binomial name
- Brassica hilarionis Boiss.

= Brassica hilarionis =

Species of flowering plant

Brassica hilarionis is a species of perennial cruciferous plant in the family Brassicaceae. It is endemic to Northern Cyprus and is classified as endangered. This species flowers from March to May. Its common name is St. Hilarion cabbage.

== Description ==
Brassica hilarionis is a perennial subshrub that grows in the subtropical biome of Northern Cyprus. It is hairless and has a basal rosette of rounded, fleshy leaves with flat stalks. The upper leaves clasp the stem. From March to May, B. hilarionis produces large racemes of creamy white flowers with petals up to 2.5 centimeters (0.984 inches) long. This species produces narrow seed pods up to seven centimeters long. B. hilarionis grows up to one meter tall.

== Habitat and distribution ==
Brassica hilarionis is endemic to the subtropical Northern Range in Northern Cyprus, from Yayla to Kornos. It inhabits rocky areas and has been recorded growing on limestone cliffs at altitudes of 400-850 meters.
