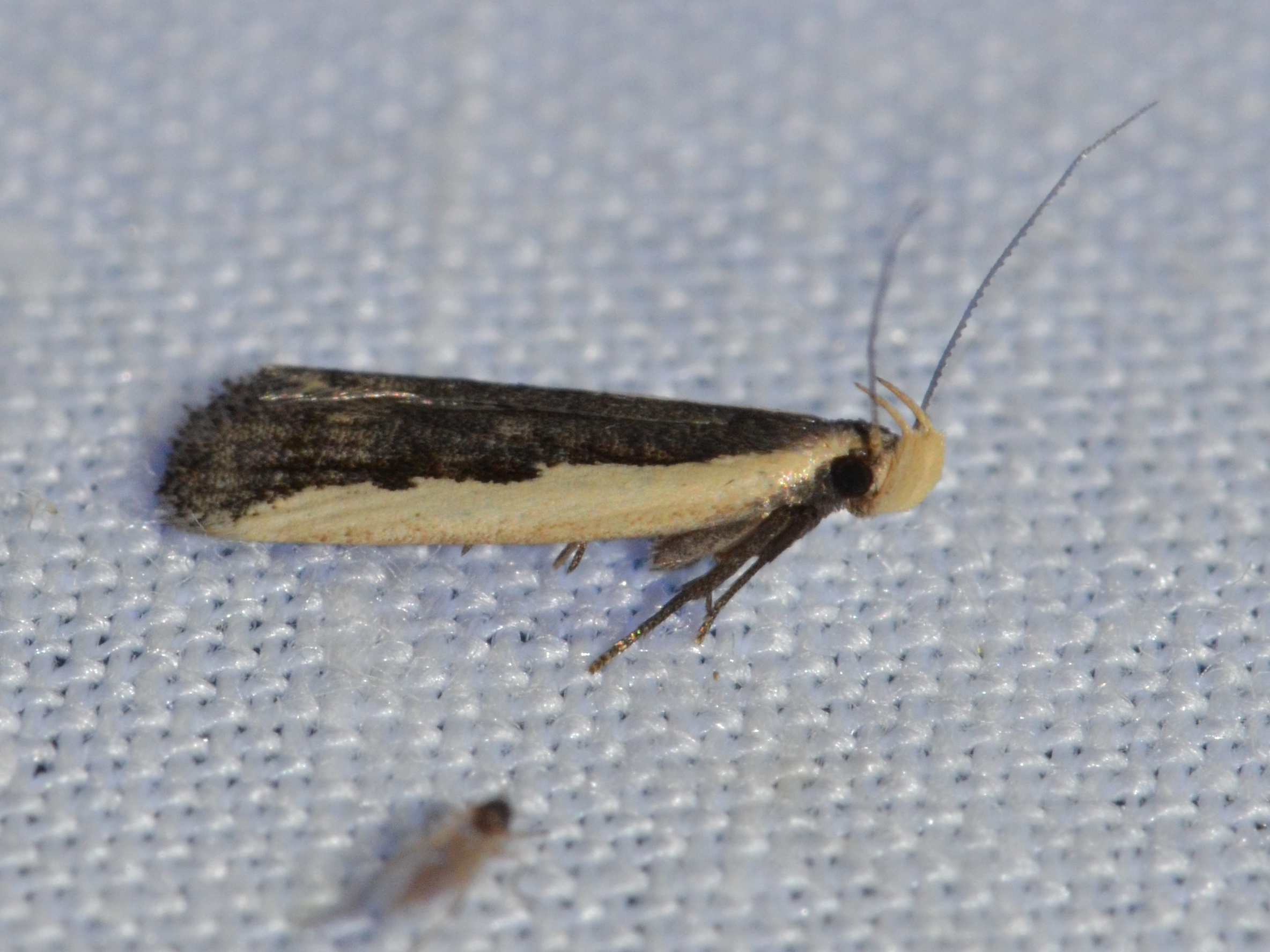

Scientific classification
- Kingdom: Animalia
- Phylum: Arthropoda
- Clade: Pancrustacea
- Class: Insecta
- Order: Lepidoptera
- Family: Gelechiidae
- Genus: Dichomeris
- Species: D. serrativittella

Binomial name
- Dichomeris serrativittella (Zeller, 1873)

Synonyms
- Gelechia (Trichotaphe) serrativittella Zeller, 1873; Gelechia plutella Chambers, 1874

= Dichomeris serrativittella =

Toothed dichomeris

Species of moth

Dichomeris serrativittella, the toothed dichomeris, is a moth of the family Gelechiidae. It was described by Philipp Christoph Zeller in 1873. It is found in eastern the United States, where it has been recorded from Florida, Mississippi, Illinois, Iowa, from South Dakota to Louisiana, southern Texas, New Mexico and Utah. It is also found in Mexico.

The wingspan is about 12 mm (0.47 in). The costal half of the forewings is creamy white and the dorsal half is dark brown. Adults are on wing from April to October.

The larvae possibly feed on Brassica species.
