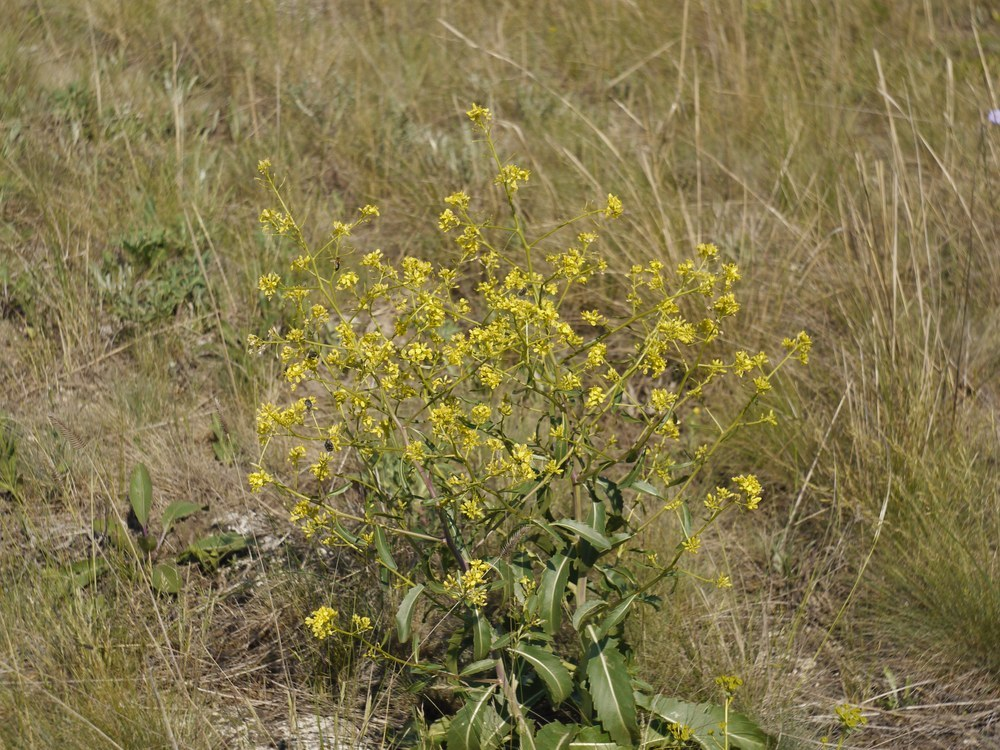
- Brassica elongata subsp. integrifolia

Conservation status
- Least Concern (IUCN 3.1)

Scientific classification
- Kingdom: Plantae
- Clade: Tracheophytes
- Clade: Angiosperms
- Clade: Eudicots
- Clade: Rosids
- Order: Brassicales
- Family: Brassicaceae
- Genus: Brassica
- Species: B. elongata

Binomial name
- Brassica elongata Ehrh.

= Brassica elongata =

Species of flowering plant

Brassica elongata, the elongated mustard or long-stalked rape, is a species of the mustard plant that is native to parts of Central Europe, Eastern Europe, the Balkan Peninsula, the Caucasus, Morocco and parts of Central Asia. Through plant invasion this species has become naturalized in many other parts of the world. Some of these naturalized regions include South Africa, North Western Europe, Australia and North America. Given the wide range of climate and ecological conditions of these regions, B. elongata has been able to disrupt the ecosystems of their native plant habitats and has been label as an invasive species in many of its naturalized zones. In North America, this species is often found as a roadside weed in the southwestern states, particularly in the state of Nevada. Studies allude that the Cruciferae might have migrated through the Bering land bridge from what is now Central Asia. Commonly known as the long-stalked rape or as langtraubiger Kohl in German, this species is a close cousin to Brassica napus (rapeseed) and a secondary genetic relative to B. oleracea (kale). As a close genetic species of the rapeseed, the long-stalked rape has one of the highest counts of accumulated polyunsaturated linoleic and linolenic acid. Both compounds are heavily used to manufacture vegetable oils. Brassica elongata has the propagative potential of turning into a horticultural product from what is currently a noxious weed.

== Distribution ==
Brassica elongata is a native species that spreads from Eastern European countries starting from Austria to the Asian-Temperate that extends to Afghanistan and Iran. There are also areas in Northern Africa near Morocco with similar arid climates that have B. elongata as a native species. As an invasive species, B. elongata has spread north up to Norway, southwest into parts of France and Italy, and has even been introduced in large areas of Southern Africa, Southern Australia, and Southwest America. B. elongata was first collected in the United States at Linnton, Oregon by Wilhelm Suksdorf in 1911. The collection occurred near a surrounding ballast where ships were often unloaded but its specific subspecies of B. elongata was unknown. The next recording had occurred in Bingen, Washington in 1915. Thereafter in 1968, with no apparent evidence of the species spreading, Brassica elongata subsp. integrifolia was discovered by John Thomas Howell, an American botanist, while driving on the roadsides of US Highway 50 in the east-central regions of Nevada. Since then B. elongata has become an identifiable common sight of the regional flora of the desert regions of Eureka and White Pine counties.

== Habitat and ecology ==
Brassica elongata is a perennial plant. Its habitat is often located in semi-arid to arid climates in regions located in Europe, central Asia, North America, Africa, and Australia. The plant undergoes its flowering during June through July in the Northern Hemisphere. It can grow on disturbed ground and on roads with open juniper and sagebrush desert areas. B. elongata can develop an abundant amount of seeds that germinate over a range of alternating temperatures. However, germination rates drop considerably at very cold seedbed temperatures.

== Description ==
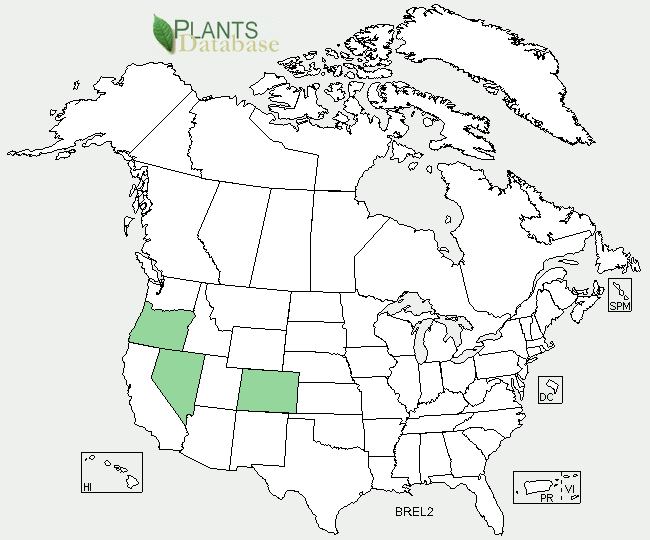
Distribution of Brassica elongata in the United States

There are five subspecies of B. elongata: elongata, imdrhasiana, integrifolia, pinnatifida and subscaposa. The stems extend out from the base and are branched basally. The basal leaves are obovate to elliptic (10–35 millimetres or 3/8–1 3/8 inches) and its margins are sub-entire to dentate. The cauline leaves have oblong or lanceolate leaves that are up to 10 cm (4 in) in length. The inflorescence is raceme.

=== Flowers and fruit ===
Petals on B. elongata are bright yellow to orange yellow with its apex rounded and mostly obovate. It reaches about 7–10 mm (9/32–13/32 in) and its sepals to about 3–4 mm (1/8–5/32 in)

in length. The filaments are 3.5–4.5 mm (1/8–3/16 in) in length with 1–1.5-millimetre (3/64–1/16 in) anthers. The fruits have a valvular section with 5–11 seeds per locule. The fruits are spreading and ascending from the base and its seeds may differ in shades of grey to brown. The seeds are 1–1.6 mm (5/128–1/16 in) in diameter and its seed coat is dehiscent and becomes mucilaginous when wet.

== Potential commercial value ==
Research has shown when measuring fatty acid content of some of the commonly known Brassicacae, such as Brassica napus, B. nigra and B. rapa, B. elongata has shown to have one of the higher counts of fatty acids in concentration of mass per leaf. These fatty acids, α-linolenic acid (C18:3n-3) and linoleic acid (C18:2n-6), are nutritional omega-3 oils and compounds that the human body is unable to synthesize. Research has shown that increased deficiencies in these polyunsaturated fatty acids lead to a higher rate of diseases for human populations in industrialized countries. While the USDA has labeled B. elongata as a noxious weed, cultivating this plant in its natural harsh and arid climate in order to harvest its organic compounds has a promising upside in a low risk scenario.
