= Brassica deserti =

Scientific classification
- Kingdom: Plantae
- Clade: Tracheophytes
- Clade: Angiosperms
- Clade: Eudicots
- Clade: Rosids
- Order: Brassicales
- Family: Brassicaceae
- Genus: Brassica
- Species: B. deserti

Binomial name
- Brassica deserti Danin & Hedge

Synonyms
- Erucastrum deserti (Danin & Hedge) V.I.Dorof.

Species of plant

Brassica deserti is a species of flowering plant in the family Brassicaceae, native to the northern Sinai Peninsula. An annual, it is typically found on chalk and marl outcrops.
