= Brassica taiwanensis =

Scientific classification
- Kingdom: Plantae
- Clade: Tracheophytes
- Clade: Angiosperms
- Clade: Eudicots
- Clade: Rosids
- Order: Brassicales
- Family: Brassicaceae
- Genus: Brassica
- Species: B. taiwanensis

Binomial name
- Brassica taiwanensis S.S Ying

Species of plant

Brassica taiwanensis is a small plant that belongs to the family Brassicaceae. It is endemic to Taiwan.
