= Triangle of U =

Evolutionary history of Brassica plant genus

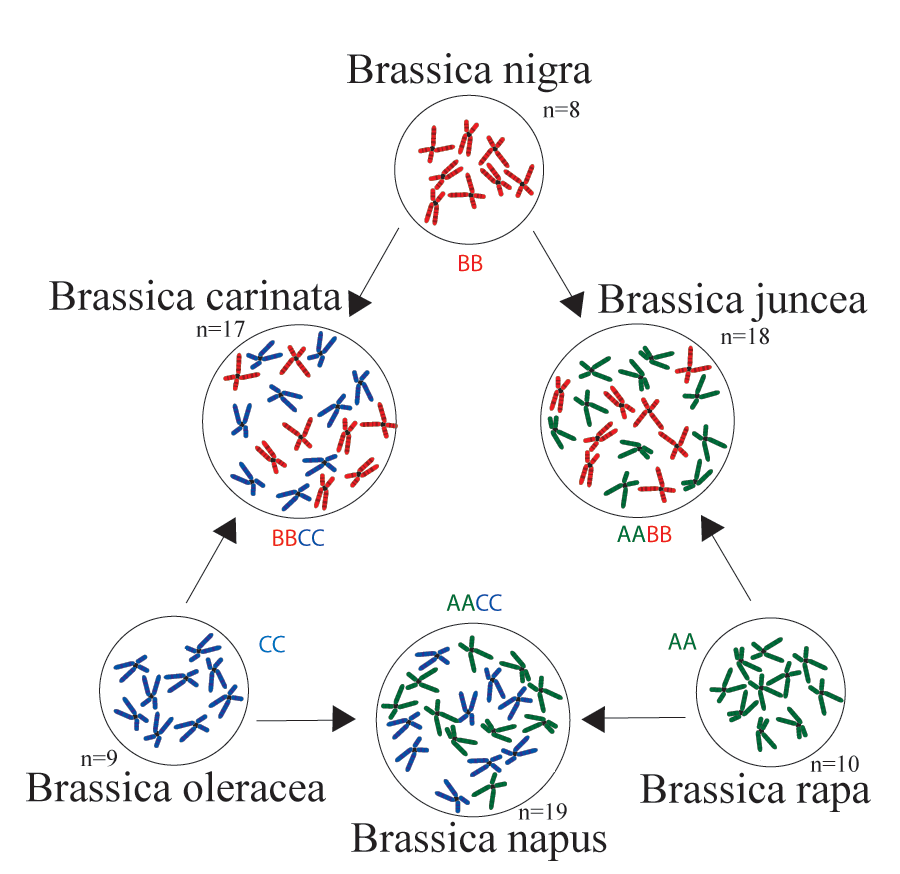
The "triangle of U" diagram, showing the genetic relationships among six species of the genus Brassica. Chromosomes from each of the genomes A, B and C are represented by different colours.

The triangle of U (/ˈuː/ OO) is a theory about the evolution and relationships among the six most commonly known members of the plant genus Brassica. The theory states that the genomes of three ancestral diploid species of Brassica combined to create three common tetraploid vegetables and oilseed crop species. It has been confirmed by studies of DNA and proteins.

The theory is summarized by a triangular diagram that shows the three ancestral genomes, denoted by AA, BB, and CC, at the corners of the triangle, and the three derived ones, denoted by AABB, AACC, and BBCC, along its sides.

The theory was first published in 1935 by Woo Jang-choon, a Korean-Japanese botanist (writing under the Japanized name "Nagaharu U"). Woo made synthetic hybrids between the diploid and tetraploid species and examined how the chromosomes paired in the resulting triploids.

== Woo's theory ==
The six species are

Genomes	Chr. count	Species	Description
Diploid
AA	2n=2x=20	Brassica rapa	(syn. B. campestris) turnip, napa cabbage, bok choi
BB	2n=2x=16	Rhamphospermum nigrum	(syn. B. nigra) black mustard
CC	2n=2x=18	Brassica oleracea	cabbage, kale, broccoli, Brussels sprouts, cauliflower, kohlrabi
Tetraploid
AABB	2n=4x=36	Brassica juncea	Brown mustard
AACC	2n=4x=38	Brassica napus	rapeseed, rutabaga
BBCC	2n=4x=34	Brassica carinata	Ethiopian mustard

The code in the "Chr.count" column specifies the total number of chromosomes in each somatic cell, and how it relates to the number n of chromosomes in each full genome set (which is also the number found in the pollen or ovule), and the number x of chromosomes in each component genome. For example, each somatic cell of the tetraploid species Brassica napus, with letter tags AACC and count "2n=4x=38", contains two copies of the A genome, each with 10 chromosomes, and two copies of the C genome, each with 9 chromosomes, which is 38 chromosomes in total. That is two full genome sets (one A and one C), hence "2n=38" which means "n=19" (the number of chromosomes in each gamete). It is also four component genomes (two A and two C), hence "4x=38".

The three diploid species exist in nature, but can easily interbreed because they are closely related. This interspecific breeding allowed for the creation of three new species of tetraploid Brassica. (Critics, however, consider the geological separation too large.) These are said to be allotetraploid (containing four genomes from two or more different species); more specifically, amphidiploid (with two genomes each from two diploid species).

== Further relationships ==
The framework proposed by Woo, although backed by modern studies, leaves open questions about the time and place of hybridization and which species is the maternal or paternal parent. B. napus (AACC) is dated to have originated about 8,000 or 38,000–51,000 years ago. The homologous part of its constituent chromosomes has crossed over in many cultivars. B. juncea (AABB) is estimated to have originated 39,000–55,000 years ago. As of 2020, research on organellar genomes shows that B. nigra (BB) is likely the "mother" of B. carinata (BBCC) and that B. rapa (AA) likely mothered B. juncea. The situation with B. napus (AACC) is more complex: some specimens have a rapa-like organellar genome, while the rest indicate an ancient, unidentified maternal plant.

Data from molecular studies indicate the three diploid species are themselves mesohexaploids.

=== Allohexaploid species ===
In 2011 and 2018, novel allohexaploids (AABBCC) located at the "center" of the triangle of U were created by different means, for example by crossing B. rapa (AA) with B. carinata (BBCC), or B. nigra (BB) with B. napus (AACC), or B. oleracea (CC) with B. juncea (AABB), followed by chromosome duplication of the triploid (ABC) offspring to generate doubled haploid (AABBCC) offspring.

In addition, two stable allohexaploid (AABBSS) intergeneric hybrids between Indian mustard (B. juncea, AABB) and white mustard (Sinapis alba, SS) were created in 2020 by protoplast fusion.

== See also ==
- Cultivar
- Hybridisation
