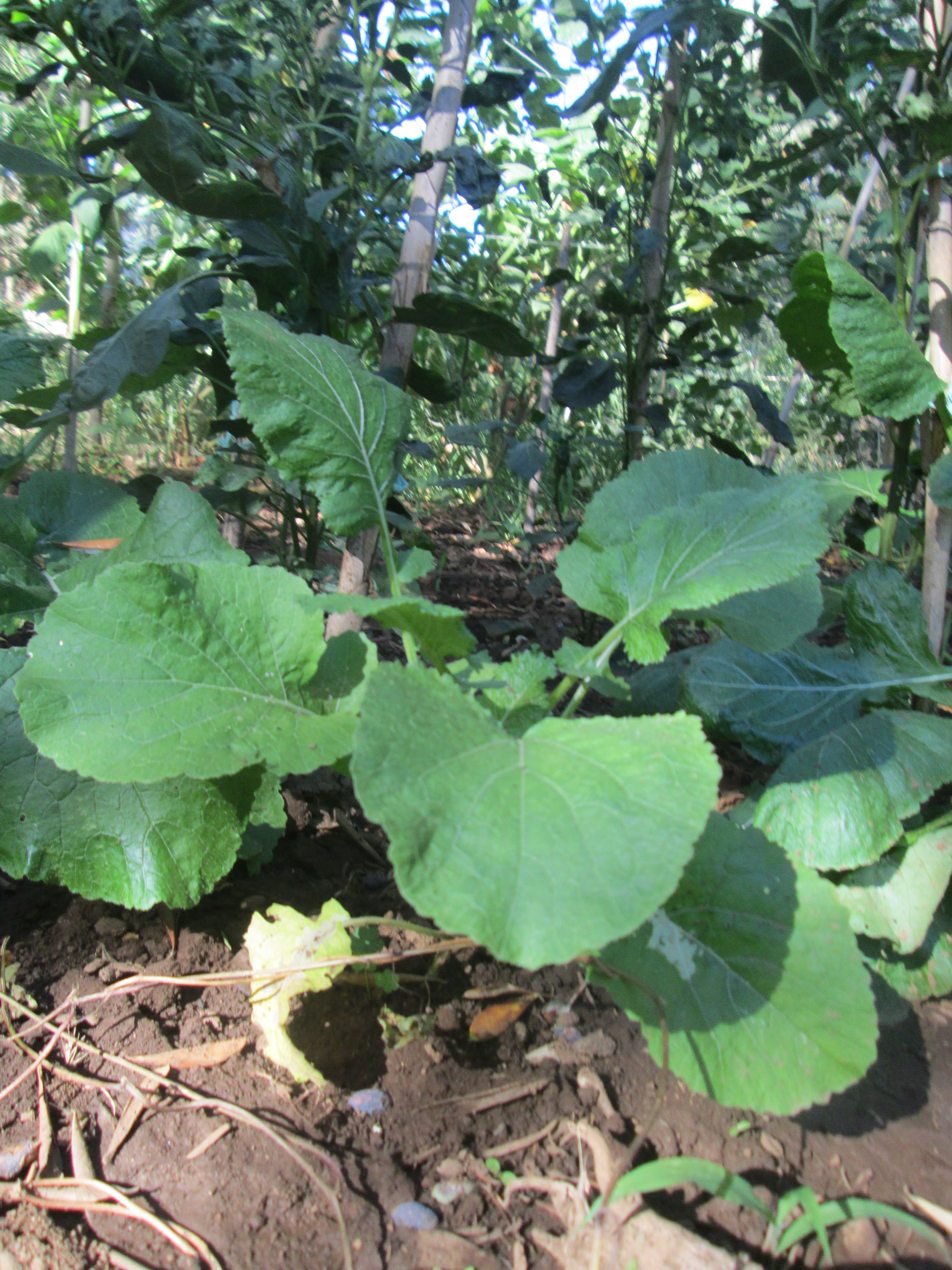

Scientific classification
- Kingdom: Plantae
- Clade: Tracheophytes
- Clade: Angiosperms
- Clade: Eudicots
- Clade: Rosids
- Order: Brassicales
- Family: Brassicaceae
- Genus: Brassica
- Species: B. fruticulosa

Binomial name
- Brassica fruticulosa Cirillo, 1792

= Brassica fruticulosa =

Species of flowering plant

Brassica fruticulosa, the Mediterranean cabbage or twiggy turnip, is a member of the agriculturally significant genus Brassica. It was described by Domenico Maria Leone Cirillo in 1792.

== Description ==
Brassica fruticulosa has a similar odour to cabbage and broccoli, when crushed. The plant's stem is smooth and erect, varies from grey to green in colour, and can reach a height of 50 centimetres. The upper and lower leaves are stemmed, with the lower leaves being lyre-shaped, lobed near the base, and bristly in parts. The lower leaves measure up to 15 centimetres. The plant produces 10 millimetre-long, pale yellow flowers with four petals each, on short stalks, with many branches forming at the end of a stem. It also bears a pea pod-shaped siliqua which has a lumpy appearance and measures 2-4 centimetres in length. The seeds, when mature, are brown and spherical in appearance.

== Distribution ==
Brassica fruticulosa is a wild cabbage which originated in southern Europe and North Africa. It has been introduced to Australia and North America (including California, U.S.A.), where it has subsequently become naturalized in the wild.

== Subspecies and hybrids ==
- Brassica fruticulosa fruticulosa
- Brassica fruticulosa glaberrima
- Brassica fruticulosa mauritanica
- Brassica fruticulosa numidica
- Brassica fruticulosa pomeliana
- Brassica fruticulosa radicata

Brassica fruticulosa has been synthetically cross-bred with Brassica rapa.
