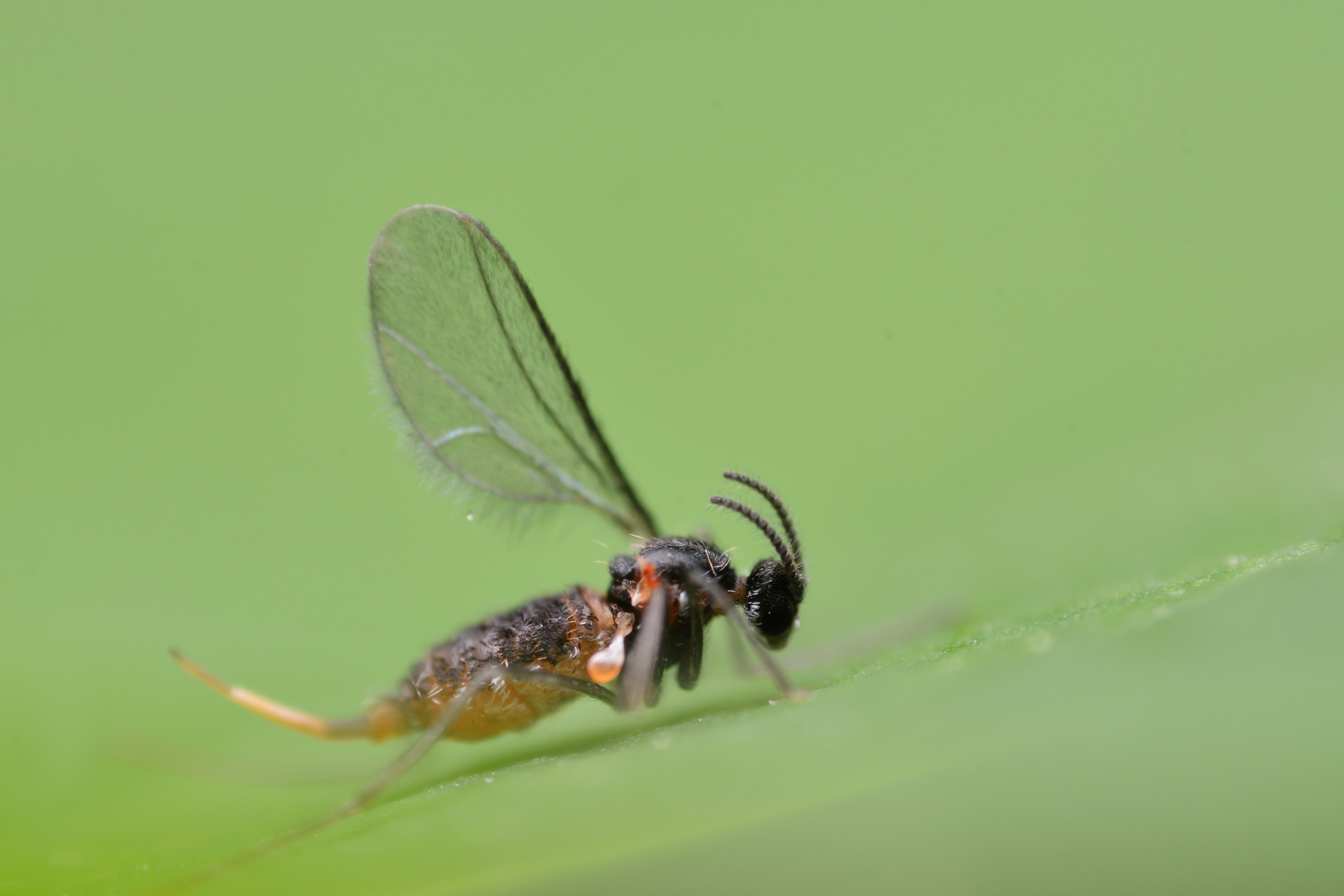
- Brassica pod midge - Dasineura brassicae female

Scientific classification
- Domain: Eukaryota
- Kingdom: Animalia
- Phylum: Arthropoda
- Class: Insecta
- Order: Diptera
- Family: Cecidomyiidae
- Genus: Dasineura
- Species: D. brassicae

Binomial name
- Dasineura brassicae (Winnertz, 1853)

= Dasineura brassicae =

Species of fly

Dasineura brassicae, the brassica pod midge, is a rapeseed pest.

== Gallery ==
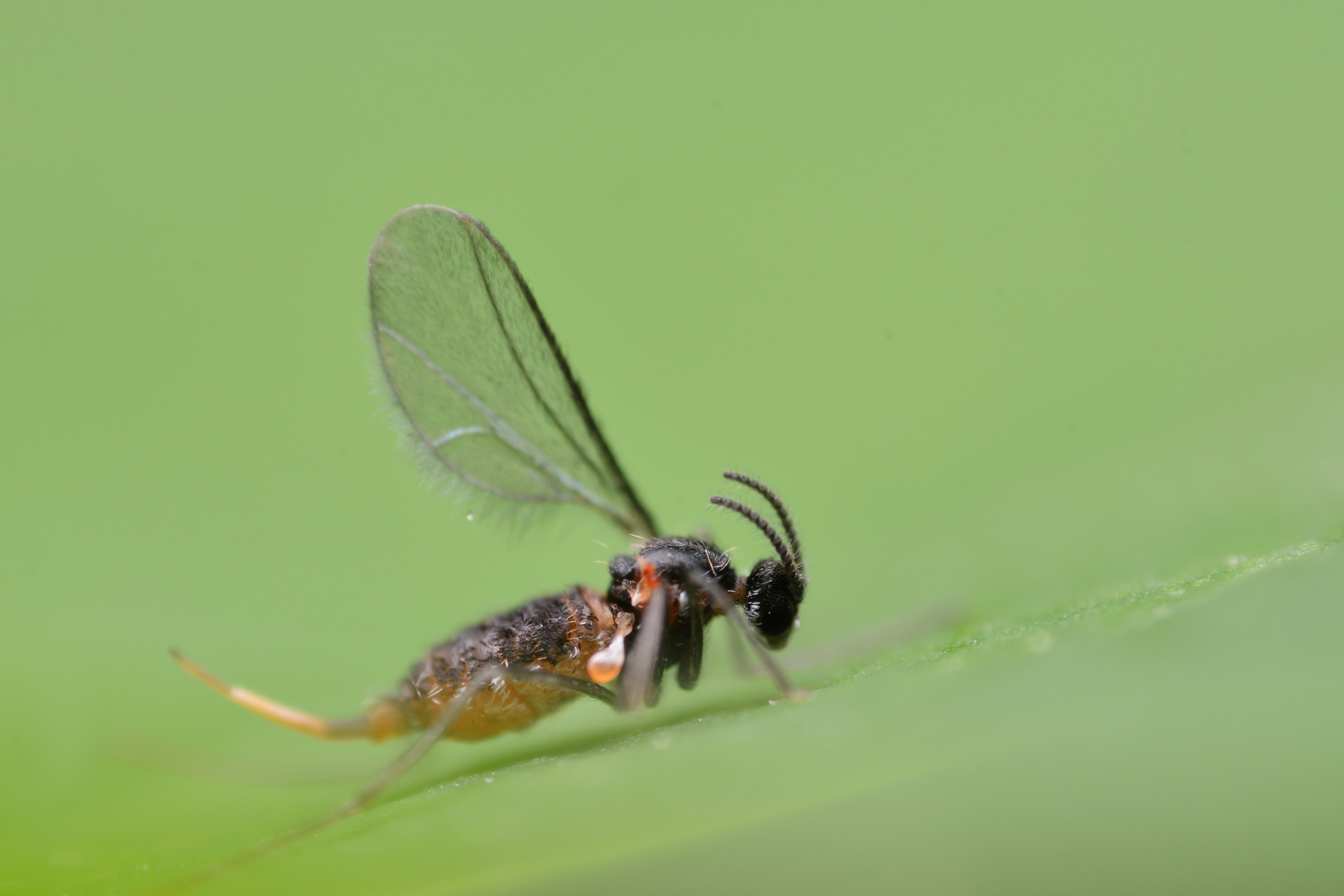
Female with the ovopositor visible

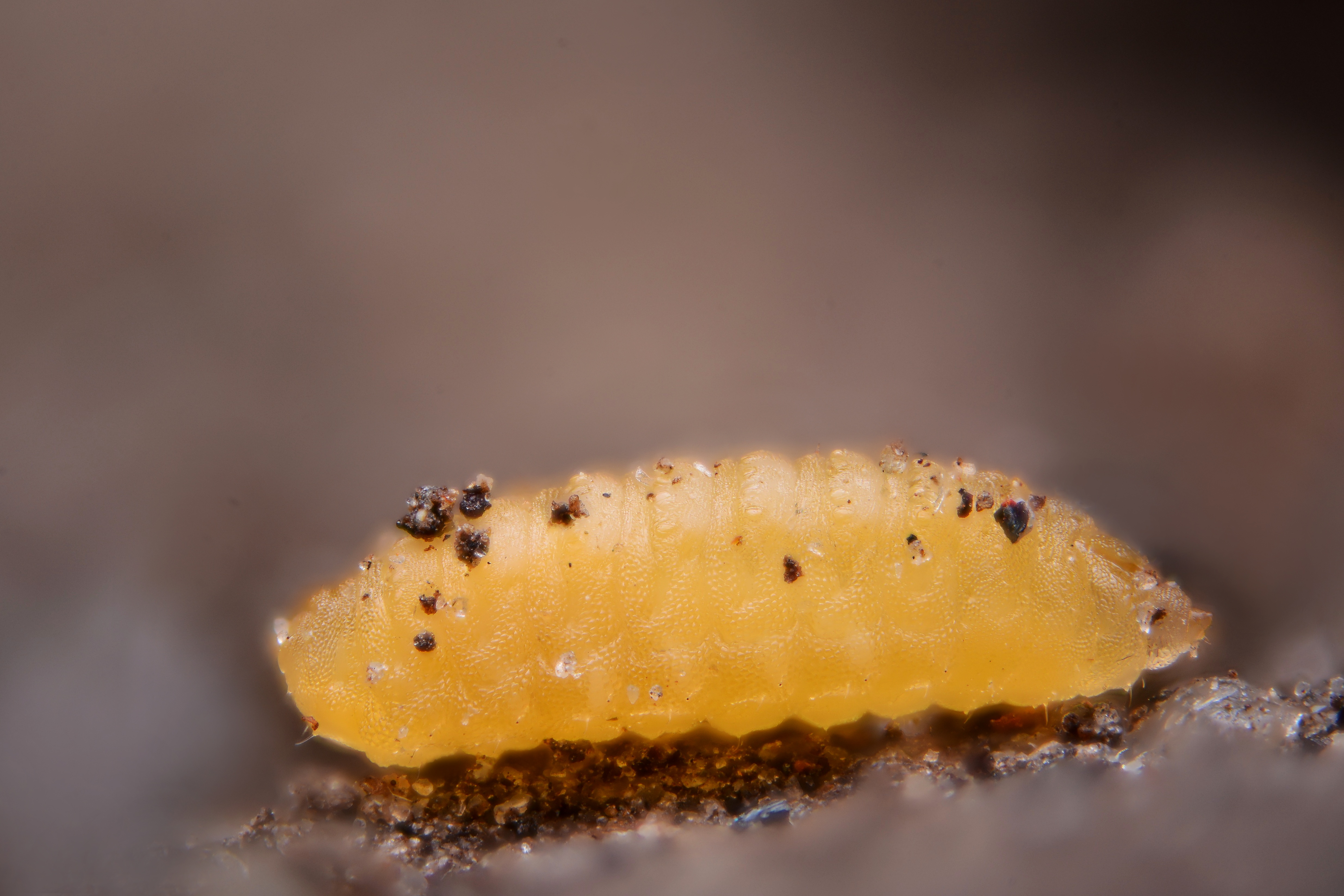
Larva on the ground

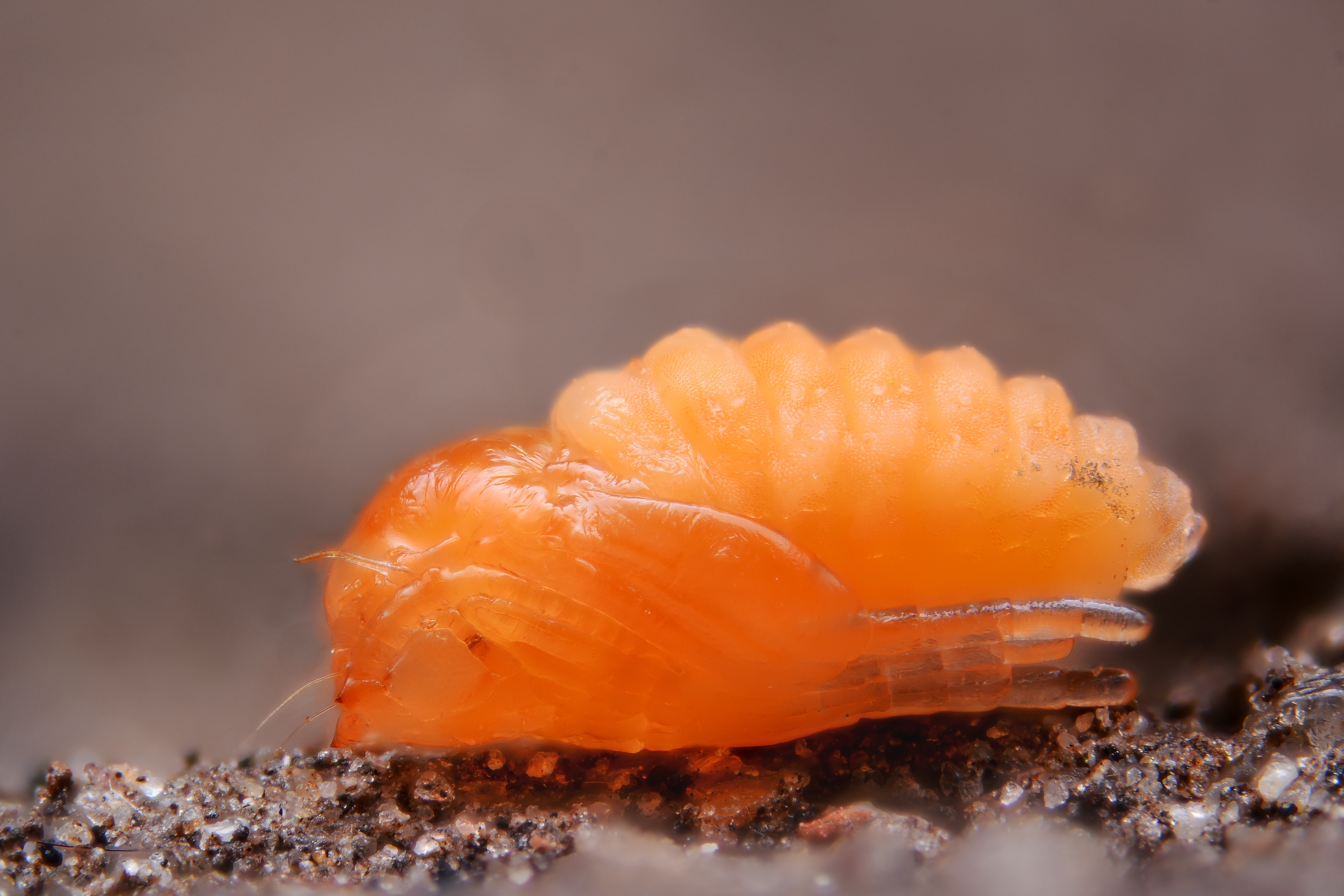
Pupae on the ground
