= NADPH:quinone reductase =

Class of enzymes

Identifiers
- EC no.: 1.6.5.5
- CAS no.: 9032-20-6

Databases
- IntEnz: IntEnz view
- BRENDA: BRENDA entry
- ExPASy: NiceZyme view
- KEGG: KEGG entry
- MetaCyc: metabolic pathway
- PRIAM: profile
- PDB structures: RCSB PDB PDBe PDBsum
- Gene Ontology: AmiGO / QuickGO
Search
- PMC: articles
- PubMed: articles
- NCBI: proteins

In enzymology, a NADPH:quinone reductase (EC 1.6.5.5) is an enzyme that catalyzes the chemical reaction

NADPH + H^{+} + 2quinone $\rightleftharpoons$ NADP^{+} + 2semiquinone

The 3 substrates of this enzyme are NADPH, H^{+}, and quinone, whereas its two products are NADP^{+} and semiquinone.

This enzyme belongs to the family of oxidoreductases, specifically those acting on NADH or NADPH with a quinone or similar compound as acceptor. The systematic name of this enzyme class is NADPH:quinone oxidoreductase. This enzyme is also called NADPH2:quinone reductase.

== Structural studies ==
As of late 2007, 3 structures have been solved for this class of enzymes, with PDB accession codes 1IYZ, 1IZ0, and 1YB5.
