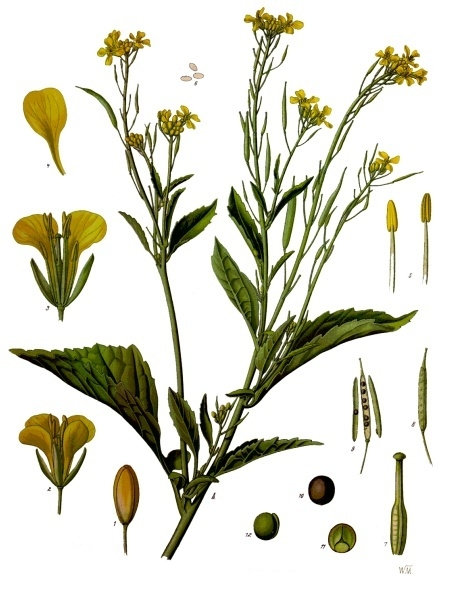

Scientific classification
- Kingdom: Plantae
- Clade: Tracheophytes
- Clade: Angiosperms
- Clade: Eudicots
- Clade: Rosids
- Order: Brassicales
- Family: Brassicaceae
- Genus: Brassica
- Species: B. juncea

Binomial name
- Brassica juncea (L.) Czern.

= Brassica juncea =

Species of flowering plant

Brassica juncea, commonly mustard greens, brown mustard, Chinese mustard, Indian mustard, Japanese mustard, Korean green mustard, leaf mustard, Oriental mustard and vegetable mustard, is a species of mustard plant.

== Cultivars ==
Brassica juncea cultivars can be divided into four major subgroups: integrifolia, juncea, napiformis, and tsatsai.

=== Integrifolia ===
Group		Image	Description
leaf mustard (芥菜)	leaf mustard (芥菜)		The leaf mustard is known as "bamboo mustard", "small gai choy" (小芥菜), and "mustard cabbage".
leaf mustard (芥菜)	Korean red mustard (적갓) and green mustard (청갓)		The mustard plant produces deep purple-red leaves(적갓) and green leaves(청갓) with green petiole.
leaf mustard (芥菜)	Japanese giant red mustard (タカナ, 高菜)		The giant-leafed mustard, also known as "Japanese mustard", "takana" (タカナ, 高菜), has purple-red savoy leaves with strong, sharp, peppery taste.
leaf mustard (芥菜)	snow mustard (雪里蕻)		Previously identified as B. juncea var. foliosa and B. juncea subsp. integrifolia var. subintegrifolia. The mustard plant is known as "red-in-snow mustard", "green-in-snow mustard" and "xuělǐhóng / hsueh li hung".
leaf mustard (芥菜)	curled-leaf mustard		Previously identified as B. juncea subsp. integrifolia var. crispifolia. The mustard plant is known as "curled mustard", "American mustard", "Southern mustard", "Texas mustard", and "Southern curled mustard".
large-petiole mustard	large-petiole mustard		
large-petiole mustard	horned mustard		Previously identified as B. juncea subsp. integrifolia var. strumata. The mustard plant has a "horn" in the center of its stem, thus its name, "horned mustard".
head mustard	head mustard		Previously identified as B. juncea subsp. integrifolia var. rugosa. The primary varieties are Swatow (dai gai choy, heart mustard cabbage, wrapped mustard cabbage) and Bamboo (jook gai choi).

=== Juncea ===
Group	Image	Description
oilseed mustard		Oilseed mustard is called rai or raya in India. Like other oilseed brassicas, it has both high-erucic acid and low-erucic acid cultivars. The low-erucic acid cultivars are referred to as canola.

=== Napiformis ===
Group	Image	Description
root mustard		Previously identified as B. juncea subsp. napiformis. The mustard plant is known as "root mustard", "large-root mustard", "tuberous-root mustard", and "turnip-root mustard".

=== Tsatsai ===
Group		Image	Description
multishoot mustard	multishoot mustard		Previously identified as B. juncea subsp. tsatsai var. multiceps. The mustard plant is known as "chicken mustard", "multishoot mustard", and "nine-head mustard".
big-stem mustard	Stem Mustard (茎用芥/芥菜头)		Previously identified as B. juncea subsp. tsatsai var. tumida. The mustard plant with knobby, fist-sized, swollen green stem is known as "big-stem mustard" or "swollen-stem mustard".

== Uses ==
=== Nutrition ===
Mustard greens, cooked, boiled, drained, without salt
Nutritional value per 100 g (3.5 oz)
- Energy: 110 kJ (26 kcal)
- Carbohydrates: 4.51 g
- Sugars: 1.41 g
- Dietary fiber: 2 g
- Fat: 0.47 g
- Protein: 2.56 g
Vitamins and minerals
Vitamins	Quantity %DV^{†}
Vitamin A equiv. beta-Carotene lutein zeaxanthin	69% 618 μg 69% 7400 μg 10400 μg
Thiamine (B1)	3% 0.041 mg
Riboflavin (B2)	5% 0.063 mg
Niacin (B3)	3% 0.433 mg
Pantothenic acid (B5)	2% 0.12 mg
Vitamin B6	6% 0.098 mg
Folate (B9)	2% 9 μg
Vitamin C	28% 25.3 mg
Vitamin E	12% 1.78 mg
Vitamin K	494% 592.7 μg
Minerals	Quantity %DV^{†}
Calcium	9% 118 mg
Iron	5% 0.87 mg
Magnesium	3% 13 mg
Phosphorus	3% 42 mg
Potassium	5% 162 mg
Sodium	0% 9 mg
Zinc	2% 0.22 mg
- Other constituents: Quantity
- Water: 92 g
- Full Link to USDA Database entry
- ^{†}Percentages estimated using US recommendations for adults, except for potassium, which is estimated based on expert recommendation from the National Academies.

In a 100-gram (3 1/2-ounce) reference serving, cooked mustard greens provide 110 kilojoules (26 kilocalories) of food energy and are a rich source (20% or more of the Daily Value) of vitamins A, C, and K—K being especially high as a multiple of its Daily Value. Mustard greens are a moderate source of vitamin E and calcium. Greens are 92% water, 4.5% carbohydrates, 2.6% protein and 0.5% fat (table).

=== Cuisine ===
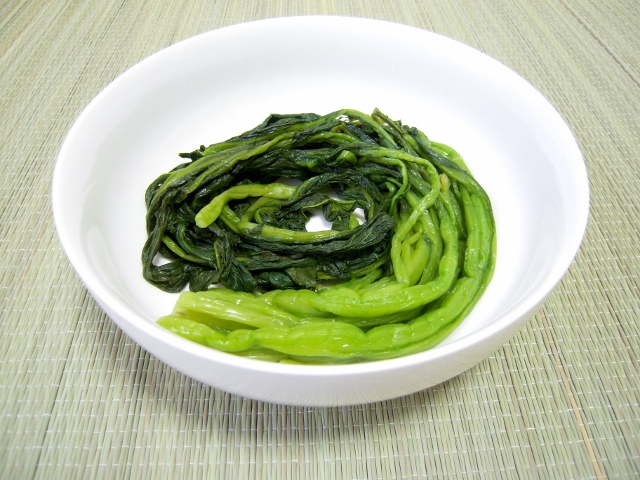
Japanese takana

The leaves, seeds, and stems of this mustard variety are edible. The plant appears in some form in African, Bangladeshi, Chinese, Filipino, Tripuri, Italian, Indian, Japanese, Okinawan, Nepali, Pakistani, Korean, Southern, Taiwanese, and African-American (soul food) cuisines. Cultivars of B. juncea are grown for their greens, and for the production of mustard oil. The mustard condiment made from the seeds of the B. juncea is called brown mustard and is considered to be spicier than yellow mustard.

Because it may contain erucic acid, a potential toxin, mustard oil is restricted from import as a vegetable oil into the United States. Essential oil of mustard, however, is generally recognized as safe by the U.S. Food and Drug Administration. In Russia, this is the main species grown for the production of mustard oil. It is widely used in canning, baking and margarine production in Russia, and the majority of Russian table mustard is also made from B. juncea.

The leaves are used in African cooking, and all plant parts are used in Nepali cuisine, particularly in the mountain regions of Nepal, as well as in the Punjabi cuisine in the northern part of the Indian subcontinent, where a dish called sarson da saag (mustard greens) is prepared. B. juncea subsp. tatsai, which has a particularly thick stem, is used to make the Nepali pickle called achar, and the Chinese pickled products zha cai. This plant is called "lai xaak" in Assamese and it is cultivated hugely during the winters. It is eaten in any form in Assam and Northeast, be it boiled or added raw in salad, cooked alone or with pork. During Taiwanese New Year's Eve, Taiwanese people eat mustard green (Chinese: 長年菜; pinyin: cháng nián cài) as a part of the reunion dinner, symbolizing longevity.

The Gorkhas of the Indian states of Darjeeling, West Bengal and Sikkim as well as Nepal prepare pork with mustard greens (also called rayo in Nepali). It is usually eaten with relish and steamed rice, but can also be eaten with roti (griddle breads). In Nepal it is also a common practice to cook these greens with meat of all sorts, especially goat meat; which is normally prepared in a pressure cooker with minimal use of spices to focus on the flavour of the greens and dry chillies. B. juncea (especially the seeds) is more pungent than greens from the closely related B. oleracea (kale, broccoli, and collard greens), and is frequently mixed with these milder greens in a dish of "mixed greens".

Chinese and Japanese cuisines also make use of mustard greens. In Japanese cuisine, it is known as takana and often pickled for use as filling in onigiri or as a condiment. Many varieties of B. juncea cultivars are used, including zha cai, mizuna, takana (var. integrifolia), juk gai choy, and xuelihong. Asian mustard greens are most often stir-fried or pickled. (See pickled mustard.) A Southeast Asian dish called asam gai choy or kiam chai boey is often made with leftovers from a large meal. It involves stewing mustard greens with tamarind, dried chillies and leftover meat on the bone. Brassica juncea is also known as gai choi, siu gai choi, xiao jie cai, baby mustard, Chinese leaf mustard or mostaza.

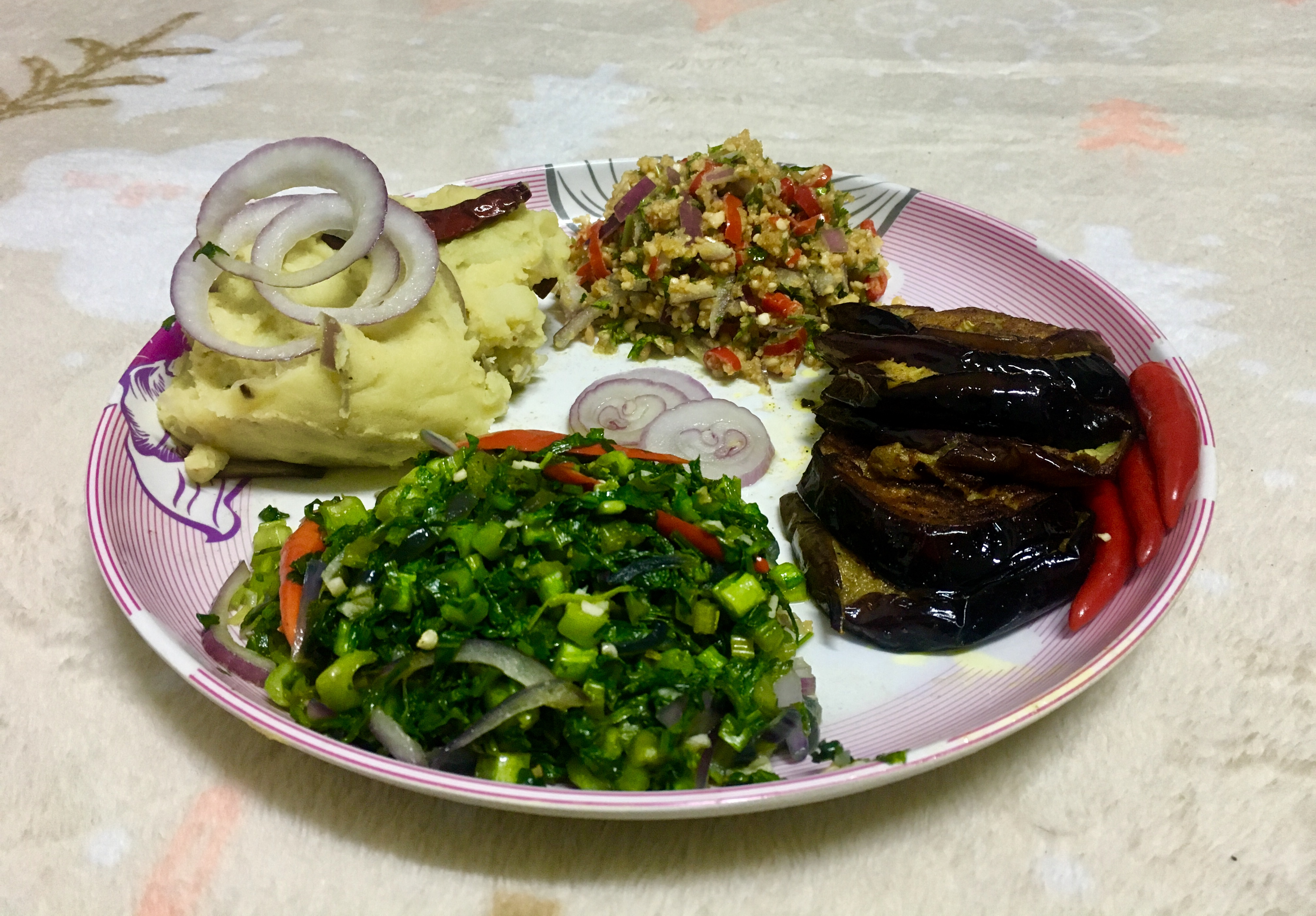
Lai shak, mashed potato and fried eggplant

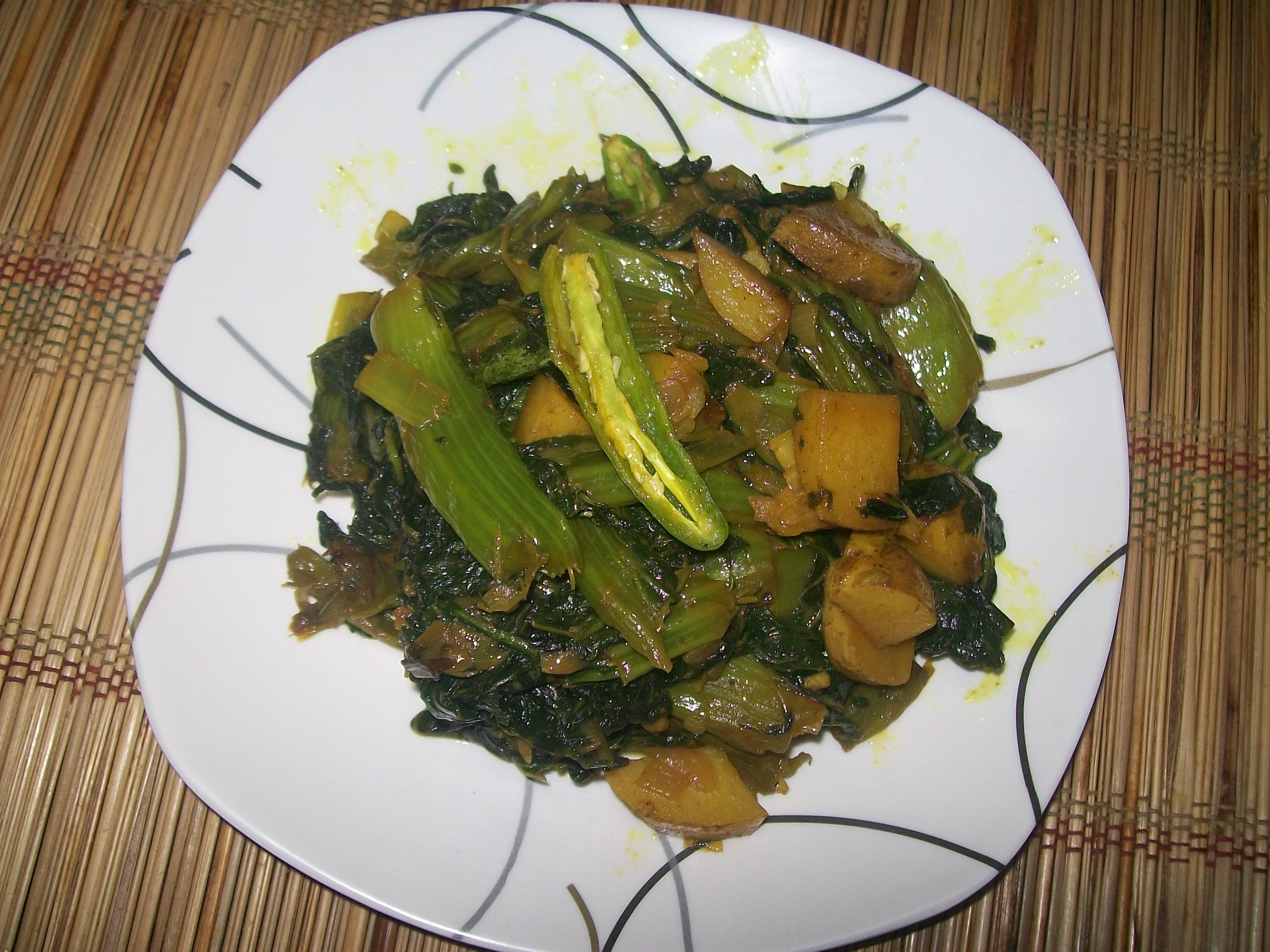
Fried mustard green dish

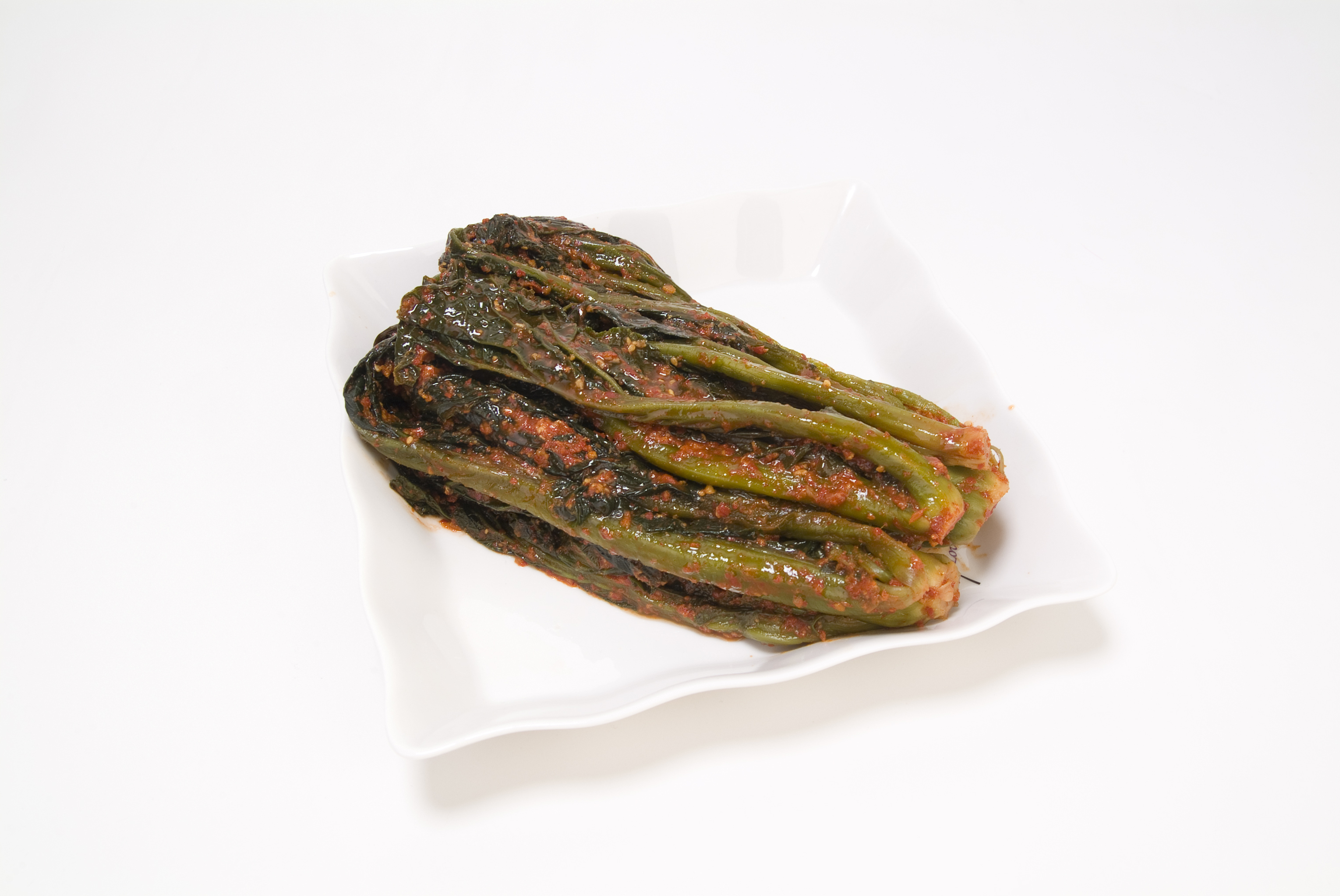
Gat-kimchi, a variety of kimchi made with mustard greens

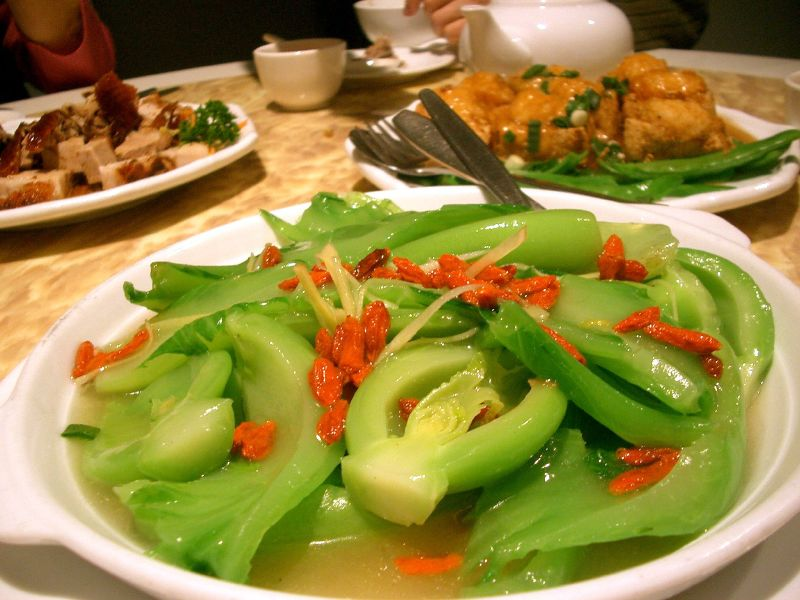
Cantonese-style braised mustard greens, with wolfberries

=== Cover crops ===
==== In southern New Mexico ====
Brassica juncea cover crops sown in autumn and terminated and tilled into the soil in spring reduced weed density in subsequent direct-seeded chile pepper (Capsicum annuum) crops by as much as 56% compared to the non-cover control treatment. However, the vulnerability of B. juncea to cold injury, propensity to increase populations of the southern root-knot nematode (Meloidogyne incognita), and suitability as a host plant for the virus-vectoring beet leafhopper (Neoaliturus tenellus) preclude its wider adoption as a method of pest control in C. annuum.

=== Phytoremediation ===
This mustard plant is used in phytoremediation to remove heavy metals, such as lead, from the soil in hazardous waste sites because it has a higher tolerance for these substances and stores the heavy metals in its cells. In particular, B. juncea was particularly effective at removing cadmium from soil. The process of removing heavy metals ends when the plant is harvested and properly discarded. Phytoremediation has been shown to be cheaper and easier than traditional methods for heavy metal reduction in soils. In addition, it has the effect of reducing soil erosion, reducing cross-site contamination.

== See also ==
- Sinapis alba (formerly Brassica alba) – yellow or white mustard, another mustard variety
- Brassica oleracea – wild cabbage
- Brassica nigra – black mustard, another mustard variety
- Brassica rapa – related family of edible greens used in Asian cooking
- Brassica carinata – Ethiopian mustard
- For other edible plants in the family Brassicaceae, see cruciferous vegetables.
