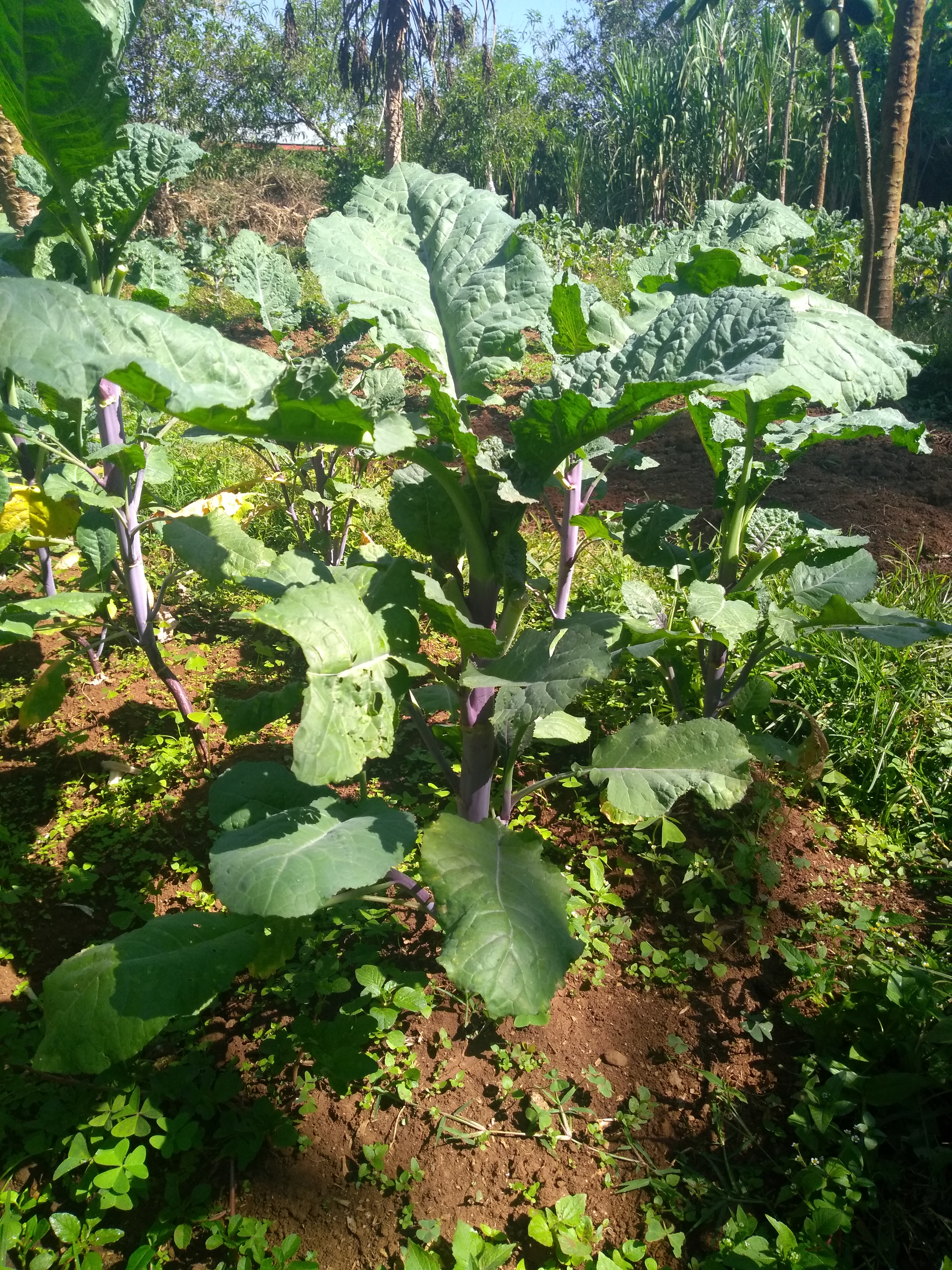

Scientific classification
- Kingdom: Plantae
- Clade: Embryophytes
- Clade: Tracheophytes
- Clade: Angiosperms
- Clade: Eudicots
- Clade: Rosids
- Order: Brassicales
- Family: Brassicaceae
- Genus: Brassica
- Species: B. carinata

Binomial name
- Brassica carinata A.Braun

Synonyms
- Brassica timoriana F.Muell. Sinabraca carinata (A.Braun) G.H.Loos; Sinapis abyssinica A.Braun ex Regel

= Brassica carinata =

Species of flowering plant

Brassica carinata is a species of flowering plant in the family Brassicaceae. It is referred to by the common names Ethiopian kale, Ethiopian rape or Ethiopian mustard. It is believed to be a hybrid between Brassica nigra and Brassica oleracea.

The flowers attract honey bees to collect pollen and nectar.

== Leaf uses ==
The plant has a mild flavor, and is eaten as a leaf vegetable. It is known as (Oromo: Raafuu); habesha gomen, (Amharic: ሐበሻ ጎመን). Named varieties include Texsel, which is particularly adapted to temperate climates. Cultivation of Ethiopia mustard as leaf vegetable is limited to small-scale production but it is slowly gaining popularity in rural as well as urban areas where commercial production is taking place.

== Seed uses ==
Although Brassica carinata is cultivated as an oilseed crop in Ethiopia, it has high levels of undesirable glucosinolates and erucic acid. The closely related Brassica napus (rapeseed) is considered a better oilseed crop in comparison.

Brassica carinata has been used to develop an aviation biofuel for jet engines. On October 29, 2012, the first flight of a jet aircraft powered completely by biofuel, made from Brassica carinata, was completed. The byproduct of Brassica carinata oil production is utilized in protein meal for animal fodder.

== Industrial application ==
The oil quality profile includes a high percentage of erucic acid (40–45%) making it highly desirable as a biofuel and for industrial applications such as production of plastics, lubricants, paints, leather tanning, soaps, and cosmetics.
