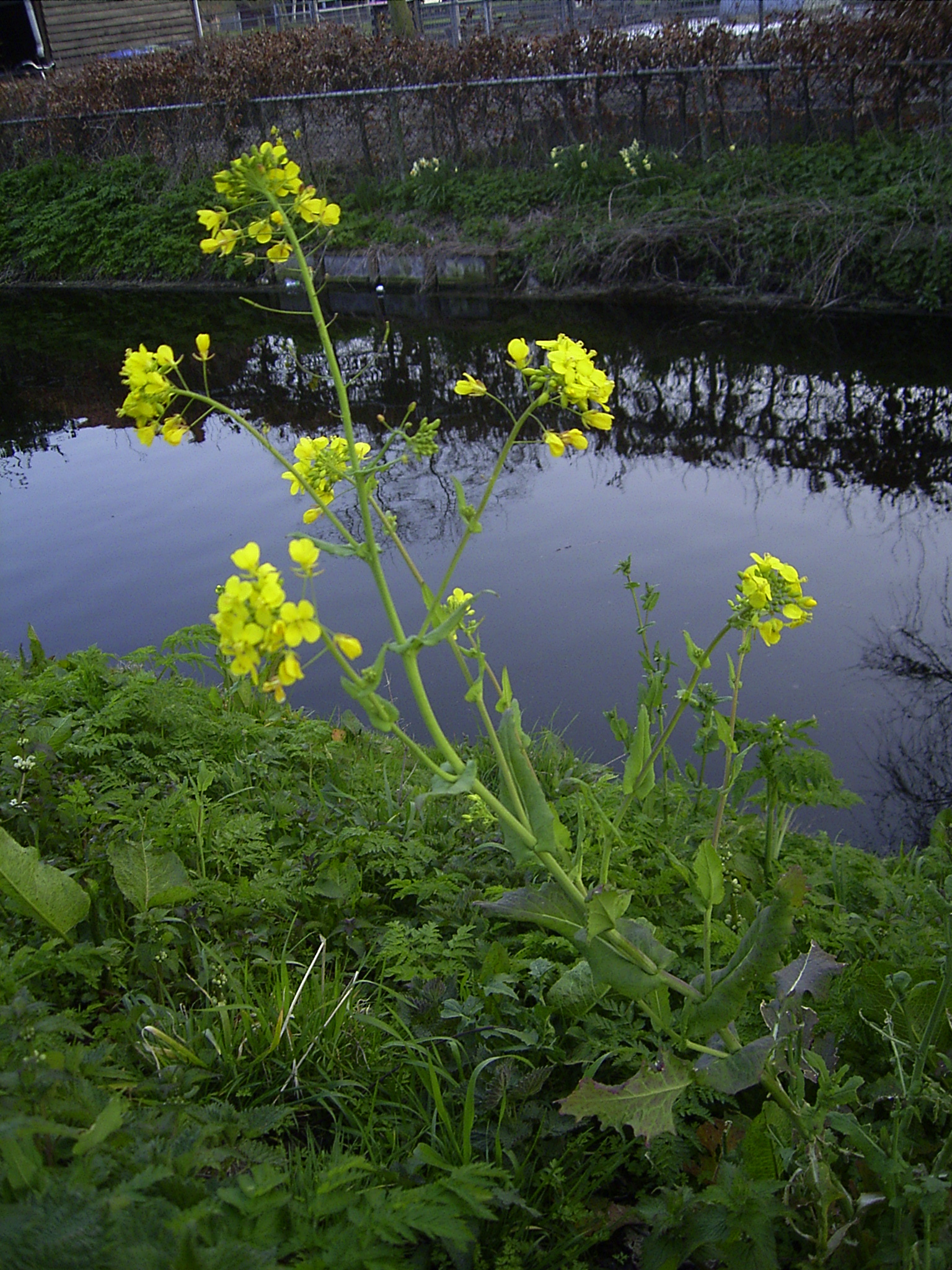
- Brassica rapa

Scientific classification
- Kingdom: Plantae
- Clade: Tracheophytes
- Clade: Angiosperms
- Clade: Eudicots
- Clade: Rosids
- Order: Brassicales
- Family: Brassicaceae
- Tribe: Brassiceae
- Genus: Brassica; L.

Species
- See text

Synonyms
- List: Agrosinapis Fourr.; Bonannia C.Presl; Brassica-napus A.Vilm.; Brassicaria Pomel; Brassicastrum Link; Crucifera E.H.L.Krause; Erussica G.H.Loos; Guenthera Andrz. ex Besser; Melanosinapis K.F.Schimp. & Spenn.; Micropodium Rchb.; Mutarda Bernh.; Napus Mill.; Rapa Mill.; Rapum Hill; Sinabraca G.H.Loos

= Brassica =

Genus of flowering plants in the cabbage family

Brassica (/ˈbræsɪkə/) is a genus of plants in the cabbage and mustard family (Brassicaceae). The members of the genus are informally known as cruciferous vegetables, cabbages, mustard plants, or simply brassicas. Crops from this genus are sometimes called cole crops—derived from the Latin caulis, denoting the stem or stalk of a plant.

The genus Brassica is known for its important agricultural and horticultural crops and also includes a number of weeds, both of wild taxa and escapees from cultivation. Brassica species and varieties commonly used for food include bok choy, broccoli, Brussels sprouts, cauliflower, cabbage, collard greens, choy sum, kale, kohlrabi, napa cabbage, rutabaga, turnip, rapeseed and brown mustard. Over 30 wild species and hybrids are in cultivation, plus numerous cultivars and hybrids of cultivated origin. Most are seasonal plants (annuals or biennials), but some are small shrubs. Brassica plants have been the subject of much scientific interest for their agricultural importance. Six particular species (B. carinata, B. juncea, B. oleracea, B. napus, B. nigra, and B. rapa) evolved by the combining of chromosomes from three earlier species, as described by the triangle of U theory.

The genus is native to Western Europe, the Mediterranean and temperate regions of Asia. Many wild species grow as weeds, especially in North America, South America, and Australia.

A dislike for cabbage or broccoli may result from the fact that these plants contain a compound similar to phenylthiocarbamide (PTC), which is either bitter or tasteless to people depending on their taste buds.

== Uses ==
=== Food ===
The flowers, seeds, stalks, and tender leaves of many species of Brassica can be eaten raw or cooked. Almost all parts of some species have been developed for food, including the root (swede/rutabaga, turnip), stems (kohlrabi), leaves (cabbage, collard greens, kale), flowers (cauliflower, broccoli, romanesco broccoli), buds (Brussels sprouts, cabbage), and seeds (many, including mustard seed, and oil-producing rapeseed). Some forms with white or purple foliage or flowerheads are also sometimes grown for ornament.

Brassica species are sometimes used as food plants by the larvae of a number of Lepidoptera species.

=== Cooking ===
Boiling substantially reduces the levels of broccoli glucosinolates, while other cooking methods, such as steaming, microwaving, and stir frying, have no significant effect on glucosinolate levels.

== Species ==
The following species are accepted:

- Brassica assyriaca Mouterde
- Brassica aucheri Boiss.
- Brassica baldensis (Prosser & Bertolli) Prosser & Bertolli
- Brassica balearica Pers. – Mallorca cabbage
- Brassica barrelieri (L.) Janka
- Brassica beytepeensis Yıld.
- Brassica bourgeaui (Webb ex Christ) Kuntze
- Brassica cadmea Heldr. ex O.E.Schulz
- Brassica carinata A.Braun – Abyssinian mustard or Abyssinian cabbage, used to produce biodiesel
- Brassica cretica Lam.
- Brassica deflexa Boiss.
- Brassica deserti Danin & Hedge
- Brassica desnottesii Emb. & Maire
- Brassica dimorpha Coss. & Durieu
- Brassica elongata Ehrh. – elongated mustard
- Brassica fruticulosa Cirillo – Mediterranean cabbage
- Brassica gravinae Ten.
- Brassica hilarionis Post – St. Hilarion cabbage
- Brassica incana Ten.
- Brassica insularis Moris
- Brassica juncea (L.) Czern. – Indian mustard, brown and leaf mustards, Sarepta mustard
- Brassica loncholoma Pomel
- Brassica macrocarpa Guss.
- Brassica maurorum Durieu
- Brassica montana Pourr.
- Brassica napus L. – rapeseed, rutabaga, Siberian kale
- Brassica nivalis Boiss. & Heldr.
- Brassica oleracea L. – kale, cabbage, collard greens, broccoli, cauliflower, kai-lan, Brussels sprouts, kohlrabi
- Brassica oxyrrhina Coss.
- Brassica procumbens (Poir.) O.E.Schulz
- Brassica rapa L. – Chinese cabbage, turnip, rapini
- Brassica repanda (Willd.) DC.
- Brassica rupestris Raf.
- Brassica setulosa (Boiss. & Reut.) Coss.
- Brassica somalensis Hedge & A.G.Mill.
- Brassica souliei (Batt.) Batt.
- Brassica spinescens Pomel
- Brassica taiwanensis S.S.Ying
- Brassica taurica (Tzvelev) Tzvelev
- Brassica trichocarpa C.Brullo, Brullo, Giusso & Ilardi
- Brassica tyrrhena Giotta, Piccitto & Arrigoni
- Brassica villosa Biv.

=== Species formerly placed in Brassica ===
- B. alba or B. hirta (white or yellow mustard)—see Sinapis alba
- B. geniculata (hoary mustard)—see Hirschfeldia incana
- B. kaber (wild mustard or charlock)—see Rhamphospermum arvense
- B. nigra (black mustard)—see Rhamphospermum nigrum

== Genome sequencing and genetics ==
Bayer CropScience (in collaboration with BGI-Shenzhen, China; KeyGene; the Netherlands and the University of Queensland, Australia) announced it had sequenced the entire genome of rapeseed (canola, Brassica napus) and its constituent genomes present in B. rapa and B. oleracea in 2009. The B. rapa genome was sequenced by the Multinational Brassica Genome Project in 2011. This also represents the A genome component of the amphidiploid crop species B. napus and B. juncea.

== Etymology ==
'Brassica' was Pliny the Elder's name for several cabbage-like plants.
