= Winter greens =

Winter greens are green leaved vegetables, closely related to the cabbage, that are seasonably available in winter.

Common vegetables described as winter greens are chard, collards, rapini, and kale.

== History ==
William Morgan classed Brussels sprouts, savoy cabbages and several varieties of kale as winter greens. Morgan grew these vegetables and compared their hardiness, identifying which species were most suitable for growing through cold winters. He presented his findings to the Horticultural Society of London in 1818.

== Crops ==
Late season crops "from October through December, a gardener can easily maintain and eat bok choy, pak choy (the purple pak choy is quite hardy), Chinese cabbage, mustard, Chinese broccoli, spinach, mache, lettuce, cilantro, kale, arugula, parsley, Swiss chard, leeks, scallions, claytonia, minutina, tatsoi, endive, radicchio, cress, beets and beet greens, collards, kohlrabi, carrots, cabbage, rutabagas, radishes, parsnips and mustard-spinach crosses."

== Nutrition ==
Winter greens have similar nutritional characteristics to other leaf vegetables and are therefore good sources of vitamins A and C. They are also a source of several dietary minerals including iron, potassium and calcium.
