= Spring greens (British vegetable) =

Brassica oleracea cultivar

In the UK and Ireland, spring greens are cabbages that are harvested as young plants with loose leaves before tight heads develop. Though the term can be used for any cabbage that are thinned early.

Spring greens are also a byproduct of the way cabbages are grown in Britain and Ireland. They are initially planted densely and every other cabbage is harvested in winter or early spring to be sold as "spring greens" before the head forms.

Spring greens are an important piece of British agrarian history as they carried the population through the hungry gap.

In all cases, the leaves, being loose, are fully exposed to light and atmospheric conditions, so are darker green, coarser, often tougher, and more strongly flavoured than cabbages that form a closed head, but are also particularly rich in vitamin C, folate and dietary fibre, making them a very healthy food.
