= January King cabbage =

Cabbage cultivar

Cabbage 'January King'
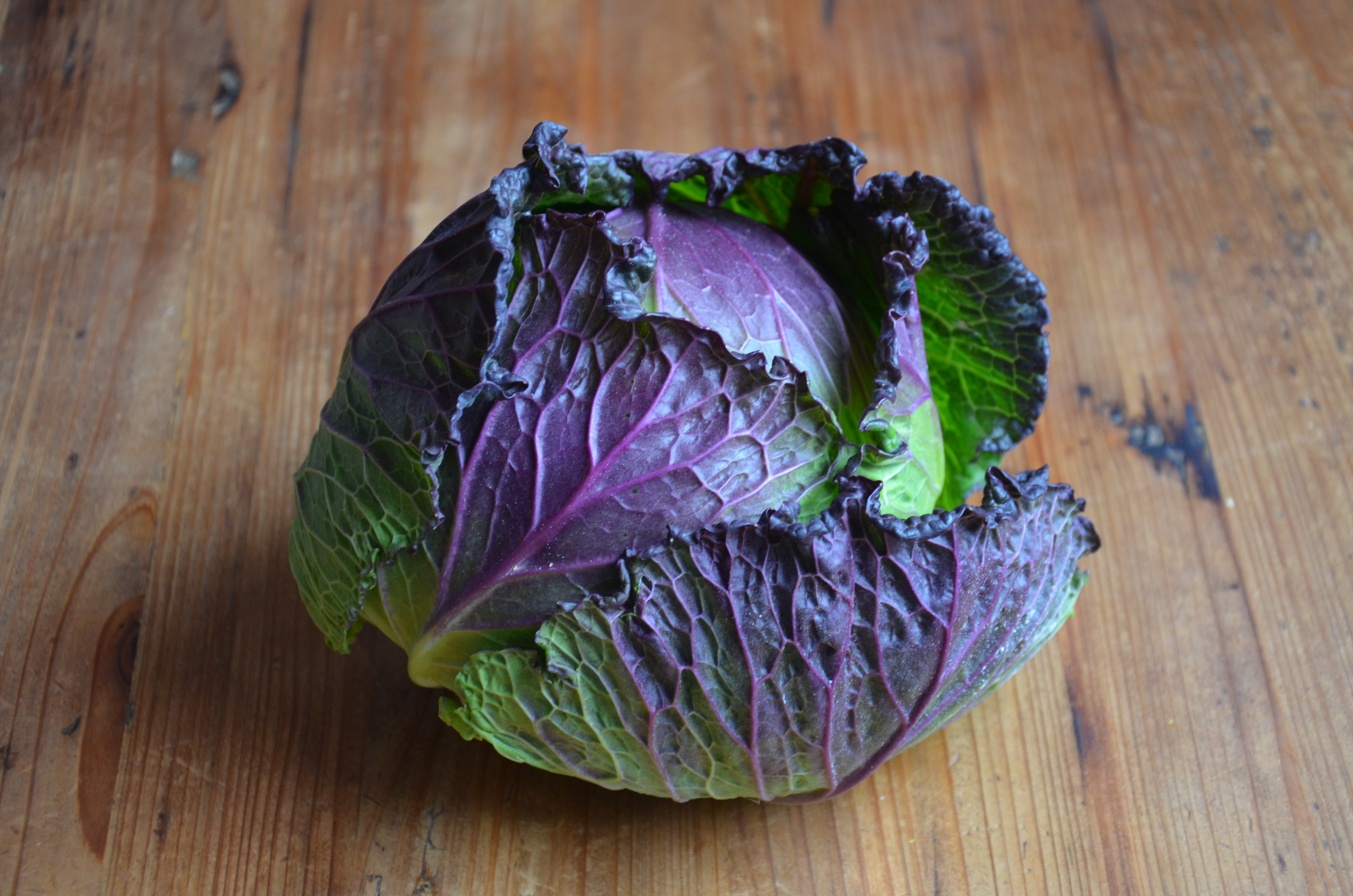
- Cabbage 'January King' is known as chou de Milan de Pontoise in France
- Species: Brassica oleracea var. sabauda
- Cultivar: 'January King'

January King cabbage (Brassica oleracea var. sabauda, 'January King') is a cultivar with intermediate morphology between Savoy cabbage and white cabbage. It is known as chou de Milan de Pontoise in France.

'January King' cabbage is a winter vegetable which has been cultivated in England since 1867. It has blue green leaves blushed with purple or red, and its small heads weigh 3–5 pounds (1.4–2.3 kg).
