= Hungry gap =

Vegetable shortage in spring

In cultivation of vegetables in a temperate oceanic climate, the hungry gap is the period in spring when there is little or no fresh produce available from a vegetable garden or allotment. It usually starts when overwintered brassica vegetables such as brussels sprouts and winter cauliflowers and January King cabbages "bolt" (i.e. run up to flower) as the days get warmer and longer, but sooner if a very hard frost kills these crops; and ends when the new season's first broad beans are ready.

Means to bridge the gap or part of it include:

- Using stored food: but stored potatoes sprout if kept too long in warm weather, and salted-away meat is used up or goes bad in store.
- Autumn-sown broad beans: this is risky as seeds could be killed in the ground if it freezes.
- Heated greenhouse, or hotbeds, to start summer vegetable seedlings sooner.
- Foraging wild greens and alliums

== Other meanings ==
One variety of kale is called "Hungry Gap" because it crops during this period: see cultivars of kale. It was introduced to UK agriculture in 1941.
