= Savoy cabbage =

Variety of cabbage plant

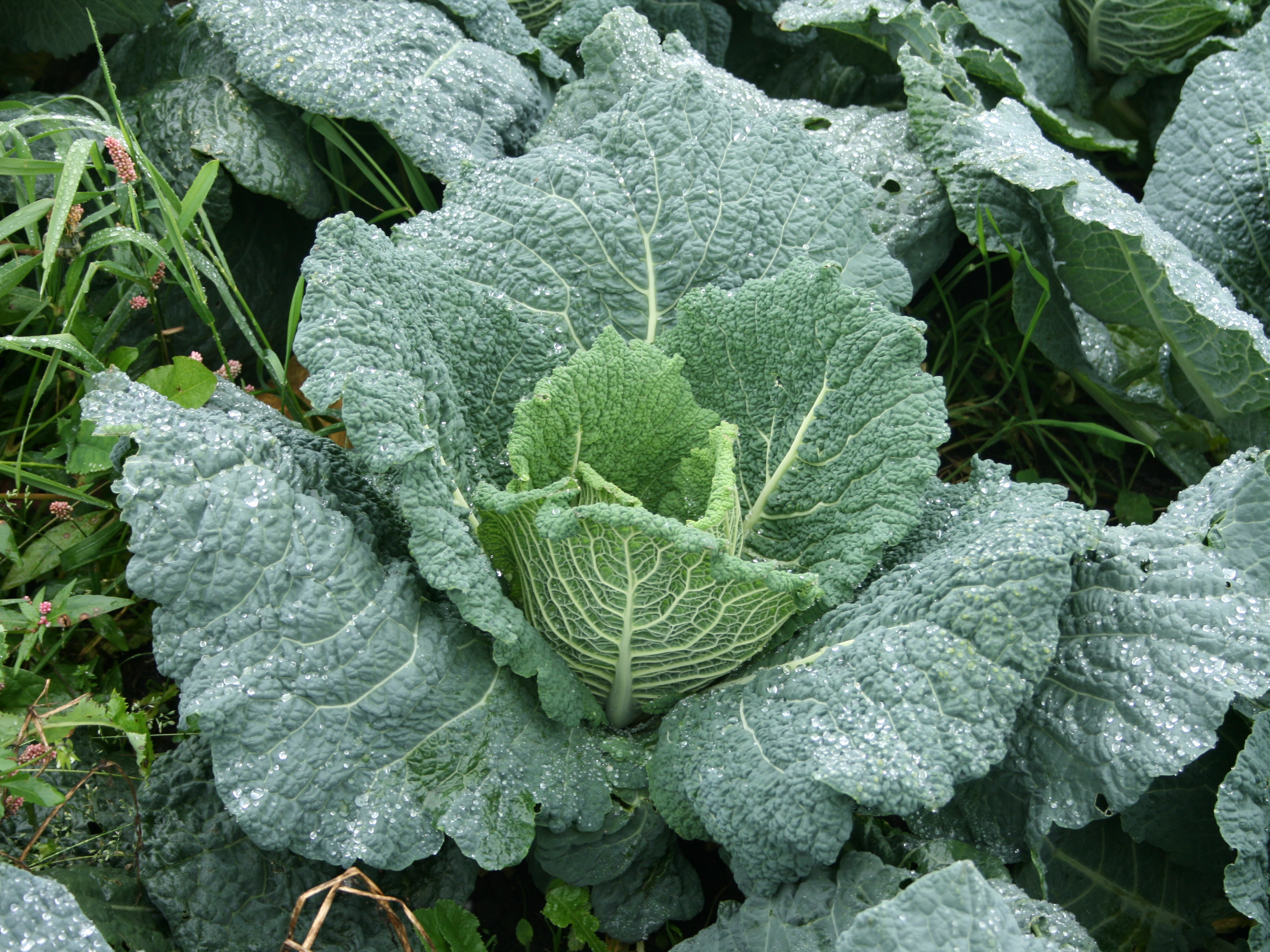
- Savoy cabbage
- Species: Brassica oleracea var. sabauda L.
- Cultivar group: Brassica oleracea Savoy Cabbage Group
- Cultivar group members: 'Tundra'; 'Winter King'; 'Savoy King'

Cabbage, savoy, raw
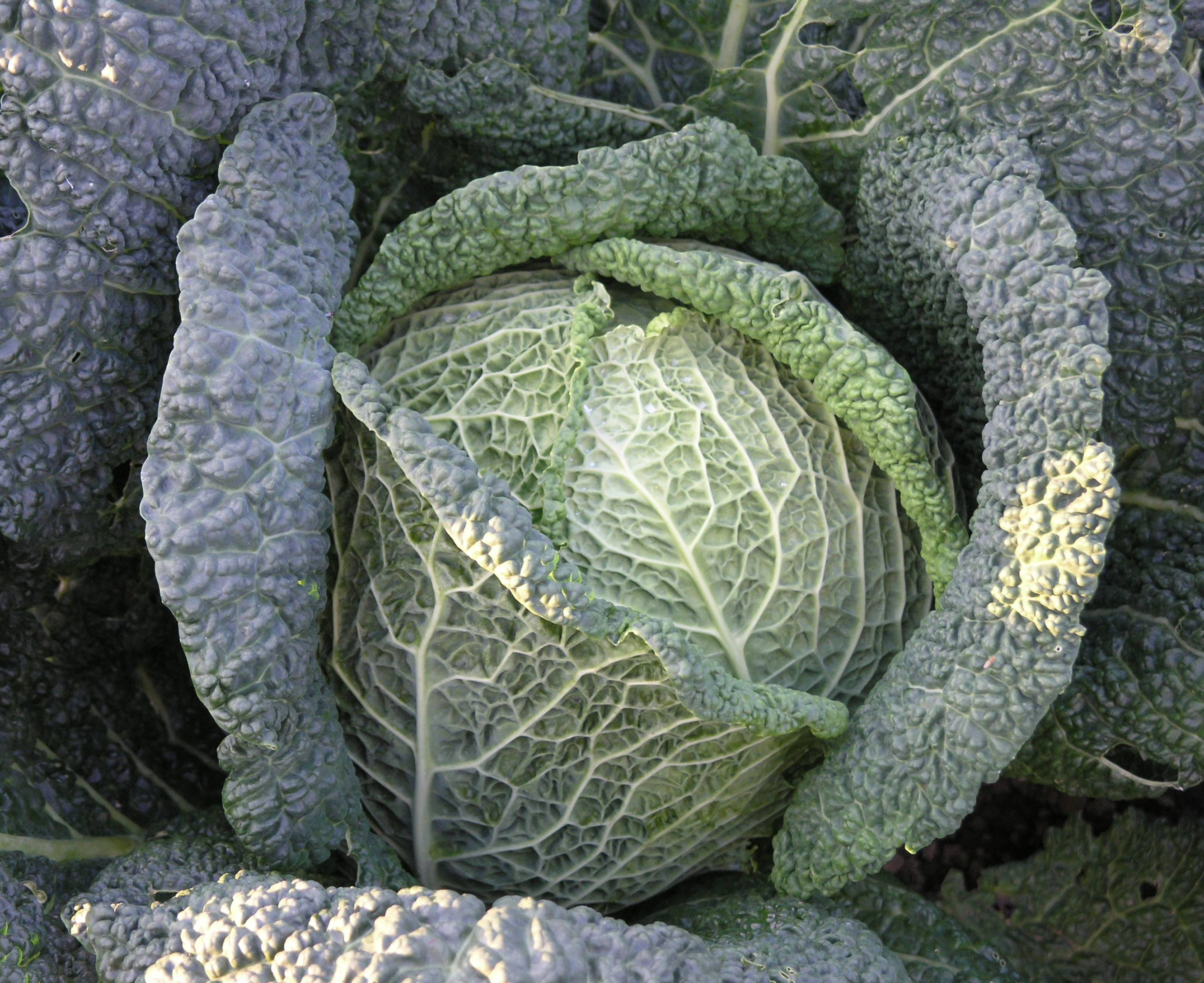

Nutritional value per 100 g (3.5 oz)
- Energy: 113 kJ (27 kcal)
- Carbohydrates: 6.1 g
- Sugars: 2.27 g
- Dietary fiber: 3.1 g
- Fat: 0.1 g
- Protein: 2 g
Vitamins and minerals
Vitamins	Quantity %DV^{†}
Vitamin A equiv. beta-Carotene lutein zeaxanthin	6% 50 μg 6% 600 μg 77 μg
Thiamine (B1)	6% 0.07 mg
Riboflavin (B2)	2% 0.03 mg
Niacin (B3)	2% 0.3 mg
Pantothenic acid (B5)	4% 0.187 mg
Vitamin B6	11% 0.19 mg
Folate (B9)	20% 80 μg
Choline	2% 12.3 mg
Vitamin C	34% 31 mg
Vitamin E	1% 0.17 mg
Vitamin K	57% 68.8 μg
Minerals	Quantity %DV^{†}
Calcium	3% 35 mg
Iron	2% 0.4 mg
Magnesium	7% 28 mg
Manganese	8% 0.18 mg
Phosphorus	3% 42 mg
Potassium	8% 230 mg
Zinc	2% 0.27 mg
- Other constituents: Quantity
- Water: 91 g
- Link to USDA Database entry
- ^{†}Percentages estimated using US recommendations for adults, except for potassium, which is estimated based on expert recommendation from the National Academies

Savoy cabbage (Brassica oleracea var. sabauda L. or Brassica oleracea Savoy Cabbage Group) is a variety or cultivar group of the plant species Brassica oleracea. Savoy cabbage is a winter vegetable and one of several cabbage varieties. It has crinkled, emerald green leaves, which are crunchy with a slightly elastic consistency on the palate.

Named after the Savoy region in France, it is also known as Milan cabbage (cavolo di Milano) or Lombard cabbage (cavolo lombardo), after Milan and its Lombardy region in Italy. Known cultivars include 'Savoy King' (in the US), 'Tundra' (green with a firm, round heart) and 'Winter King' (with dark crumpled leaves).

== Uses ==
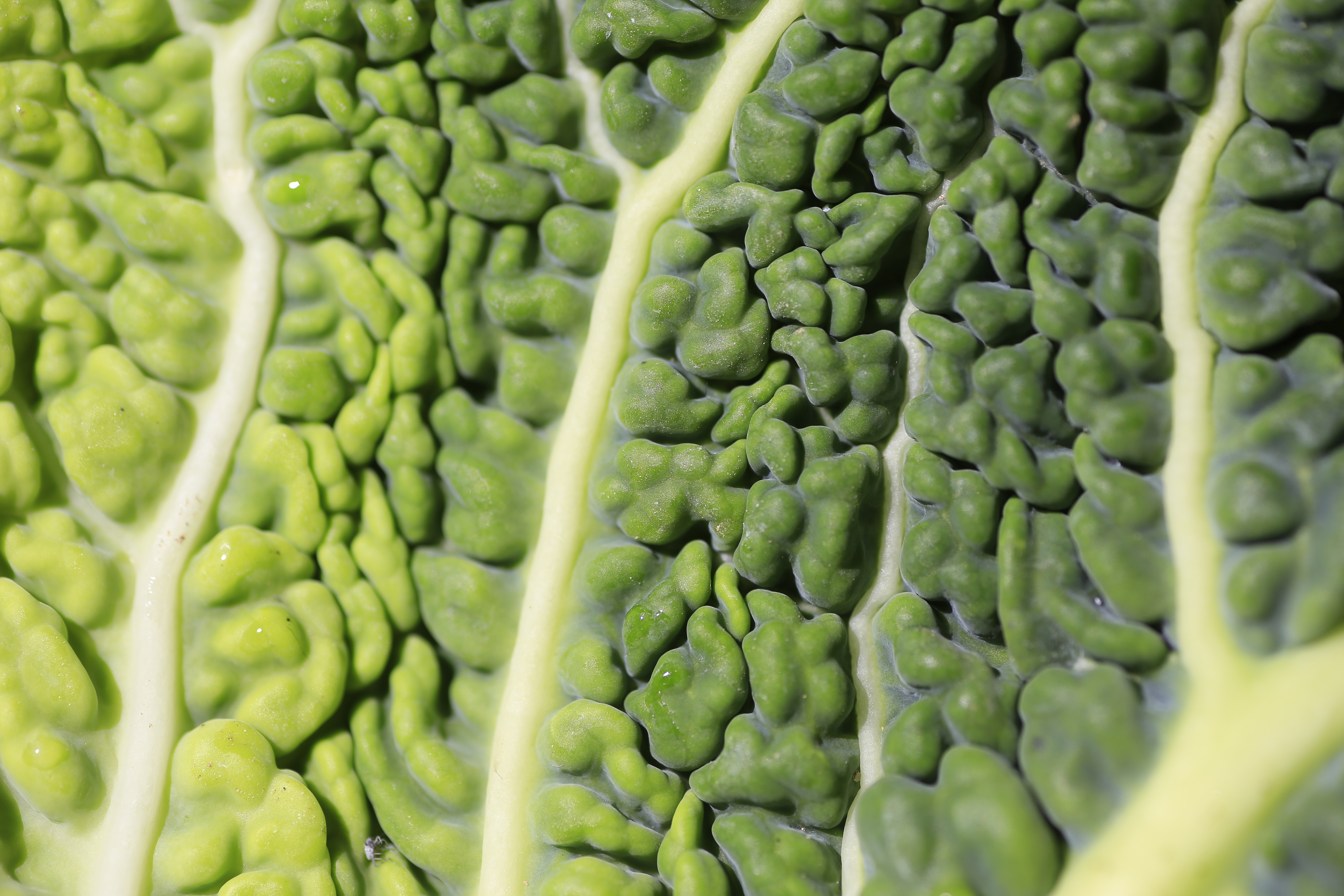
Upper epidermis of the leaf

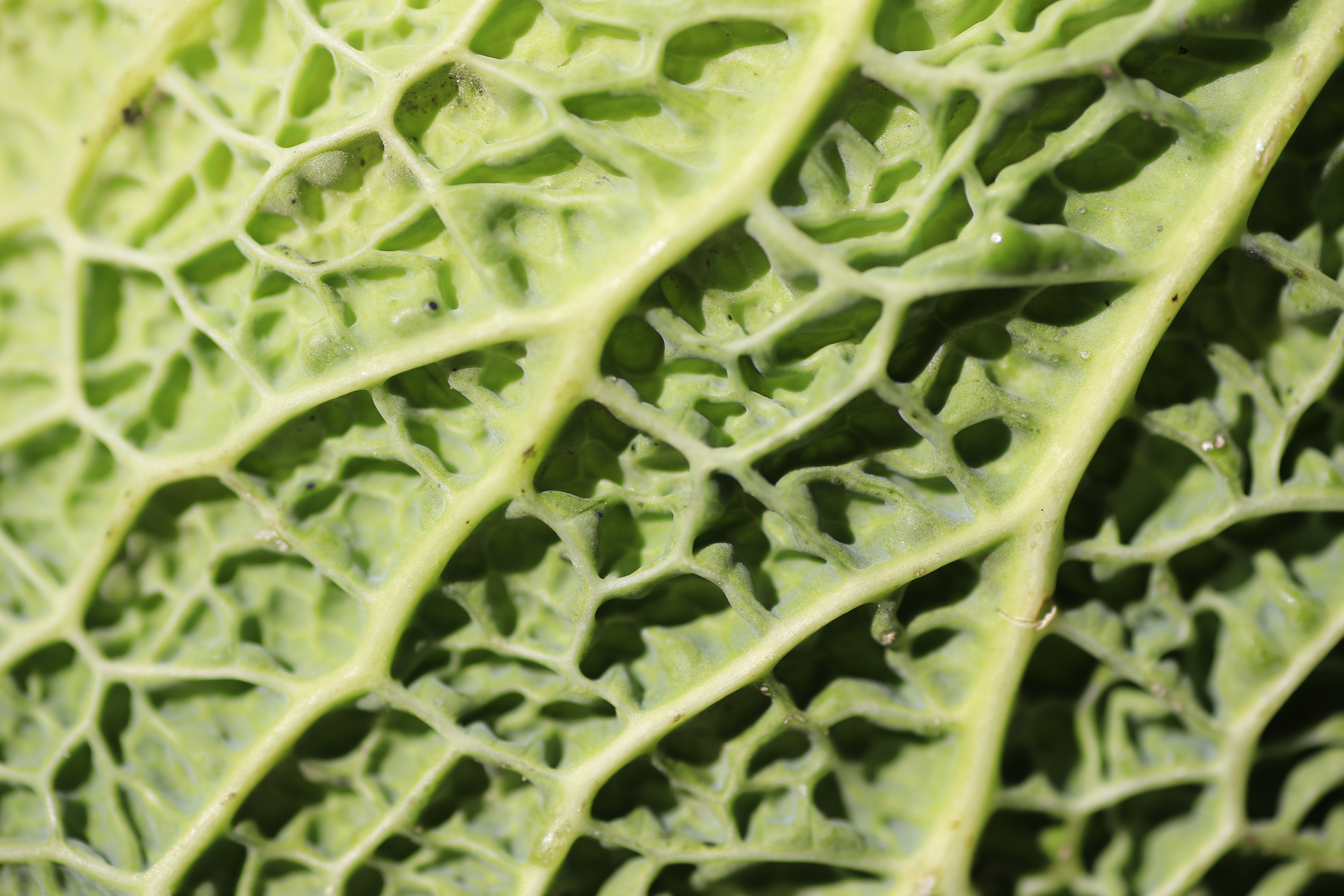
Lower epidermis of the leaf

Savoy cabbage maintains a firm texture when cooked, which is desired in some recipes. Savoy cabbage can be used in a variety of ways. It pairs well with white wine, apples, spices, horseradish and meat. It can be used for roulades, in stews and soups, such as borscht, as well as roasted plain and drizzled with olive oil. It can be used in preserved recipes such as kimchi or sauerkraut, and with strong and unusual seasonings such as juniper.

Signs of desirable quality include cabbage that is heavy for its size with leaves that are unblemished and have a bright, fresh look. Peak season for most cabbages in the Northern Hemisphere runs from November through April.

Fresh whole cabbage will keep in the refrigerator for one to six weeks depending on type and variety. Hard green, white or red cabbages will keep the longest while the looser Savoy and Chinese varieties such as bok choy need to be consumed more quickly. It is necessary to keep the outer leaves intact without washing when storing since moisture hastens decay.

Savoy can be difficult to grow as it is vulnerable to caterpillars, pigeons, and club root disease. It does best in full sun, and is winter-hardy, able to tolerate the cold, frost, and snow.

== Nutrition ==
Raw Savoy cabbage is 91% water, 6% carbohydrates, 2% protein, and contains negligible fat (table). In a reference amount of 100 grams (3.5 oz), it supplies 27 calories, and is a rich source (20% or more of the Daily Value, DV) of vitamin K (66% DV), vitamin C (37% DV), and folate (20% DV), with a moderate amount of vitamin B6 (15% DV). There are no other micronutrients in significant content (table).

== See also ==
- January King cabbage (another winter cabbage)
