= Vacuum cooling =

Rapid cooling technique using the principle of evaporative cooling

Vacuum cooling is a rapid cooling technique for any porous product that has free water and uses the principle of evaporative cooling. Vacuum cooling is generally used for cooling food products that have a high water content and large porosities, due to its efficacy in losing water from both within and outside the products. (Lettuce is an example of vacuum cooled products.) This is the most widely used technique for rapid cooling of food products which has been proven to be one of the most efficient and economical methods of cooling and storage of vegetables, fruits, flowers, and more.

This cooling technology not only largely improves the product quality, but also increases the shelf life of the product and, at the same time, it reduces the cooling costs compared to the conventional cooling methods available.

== Principle ==
The technology is based on the phenomenon that as the vapor pressure on a liquid reduces, its boiling point reduces. The boiling point of a liquid is defined as the temperature at which the vapor pressure of the liquid is equal to the external pressure. When the pressure put onto a liquid is reduced, the vapor pressure needed to induce boiling is also reduced, and therefore the boiling point of the liquid decreases. By reducing pressure, boiling water is possible at lower temperatures. This rapid evaporation of moisture from the surface and within the products due to the low surrounding pressure absorbs the necessary latent heat for phase change from the product itself. This latent heat required for evaporation is obtained mostly from the sensible heat of the product and as a consequence of this evaporation the temperature of the product falls and the product can be cooled down to its desired storage temperature.

== Process ==
An airtight chamber is maintained by removing air from the inside of the chamber using a vacuum pump. The products to be cooled are kept in that airtight chamber. As the pressure is reduced the boiling point of water reduces and water starts to evaporate, taking heat from the product. As a consequence of this evaporation, the product temperature begins to decrease. This cooling process of the products continues until it reaches the desired product temperature.

For maintaining a steady cooling process, it is necessary to evacuate the chamber continuously. Other factors that determine the cooling process are the surface area of the product that is available for heat transfer as well as the product's sensitivity to losing water.

== Advantages ==
As the product is cooled uniformly throughout the body without any temperature gradient in the body, the shelf life of the product increases.

Cooling the product through vacuum cooling takes roughly a quarter of the energy of other traditional cooling methods.

== Disadvantage ==
Sometimes excess moisture loss during the cooling process will deteriorate the product's quality and therefore there is a limit to the cooling process. This problem is to be taken care of by maintaining the required pressure, temperature, and time of cooling.
