= Cabbage =

Leafy vegetable in the flowering plant family Brassicaceae

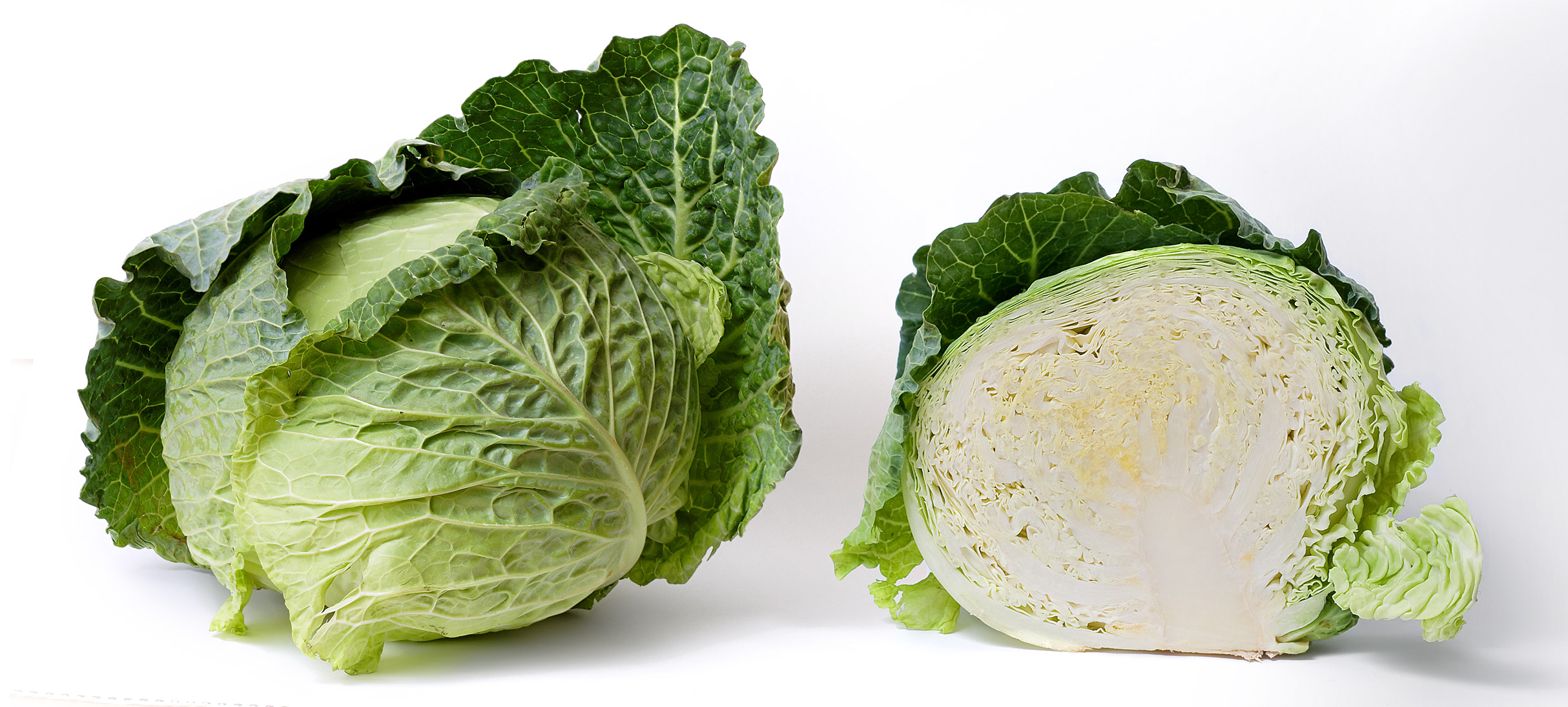
- A savoy cabbage and a cross section
- Species: Brassica oleracea
- Cultivar group: Capitata Group
- Origin: Europe, prior to 1000 BC
- Cultivar group members: White cabbage; Red cabbage; Savoy cabbage

Cabbage, comprising several cultivars of Brassica oleracea, is a leafy green, red (purple), or white (pale green) biennial plant grown as an annual vegetable crop for its dense-leaved heads. It is descended from the wild cabbage (B. oleracea var. oleracea), and belongs to the "cole crops" or brassicas, meaning it is closely related to broccoli and cauliflower (var. botrytis); Brussels sprouts (var. gemmifera); and Savoy cabbage (var. sabauda).

A cabbage generally weighs between 500 and 1,000 grams (1 and 2 lb). Smooth-leafed, firm-headed green cabbages are the most common, with smooth-leafed purple cabbages and crinkle-leafed savoy cabbages of both colours being rarer. Under conditions of long sunny days, such as those found at high northern latitudes in summer, cabbages can grow quite large. As of 2012, the heaviest cabbage was 62.71 kilograms (138 lb 4 oz). Cabbage heads are generally picked during the first year of the plant's life cycle, but plants intended for seed are allowed to grow a second year and must be kept separate from other cole crops to prevent cross-pollination. Cabbage is prone to several nutrient deficiencies, as well as to multiple pests, and bacterial and fungal diseases.

Cabbage was most likely domesticated somewhere in Europe in ancient history before 1000 BC. Cabbage use in cuisine has been documented since antiquity. It was described as a table luxury in the Roman Empire. By the Middle Ages, cabbage had become a prominent part of European cuisine, as indicated by manuscript illuminations. New variants were introduced from the Renaissance on, mostly by Germanic-speaking peoples. Savoy cabbage was developed in the 16th century. By the 17th and 18th centuries, cabbage was popularised as a staple food in central, northern, and Eastern Europe. It was also employed by European sailors to prevent scurvy during long sea voyages. Starting in the early modern era, cabbage was exported to the Americas, Asia, and around the world.

Cabbages can be prepared many different ways for eating; they can be pickled, fermented (for dishes such as sauerkraut and kimchi), steamed, stewed, roasted, sautéed, braised, or eaten raw. Raw cabbage is a rich source of vitamin K, vitamin C, and dietary fiber. China is the largest producer of cabbages, providing 48% of the world total.

== Description ==
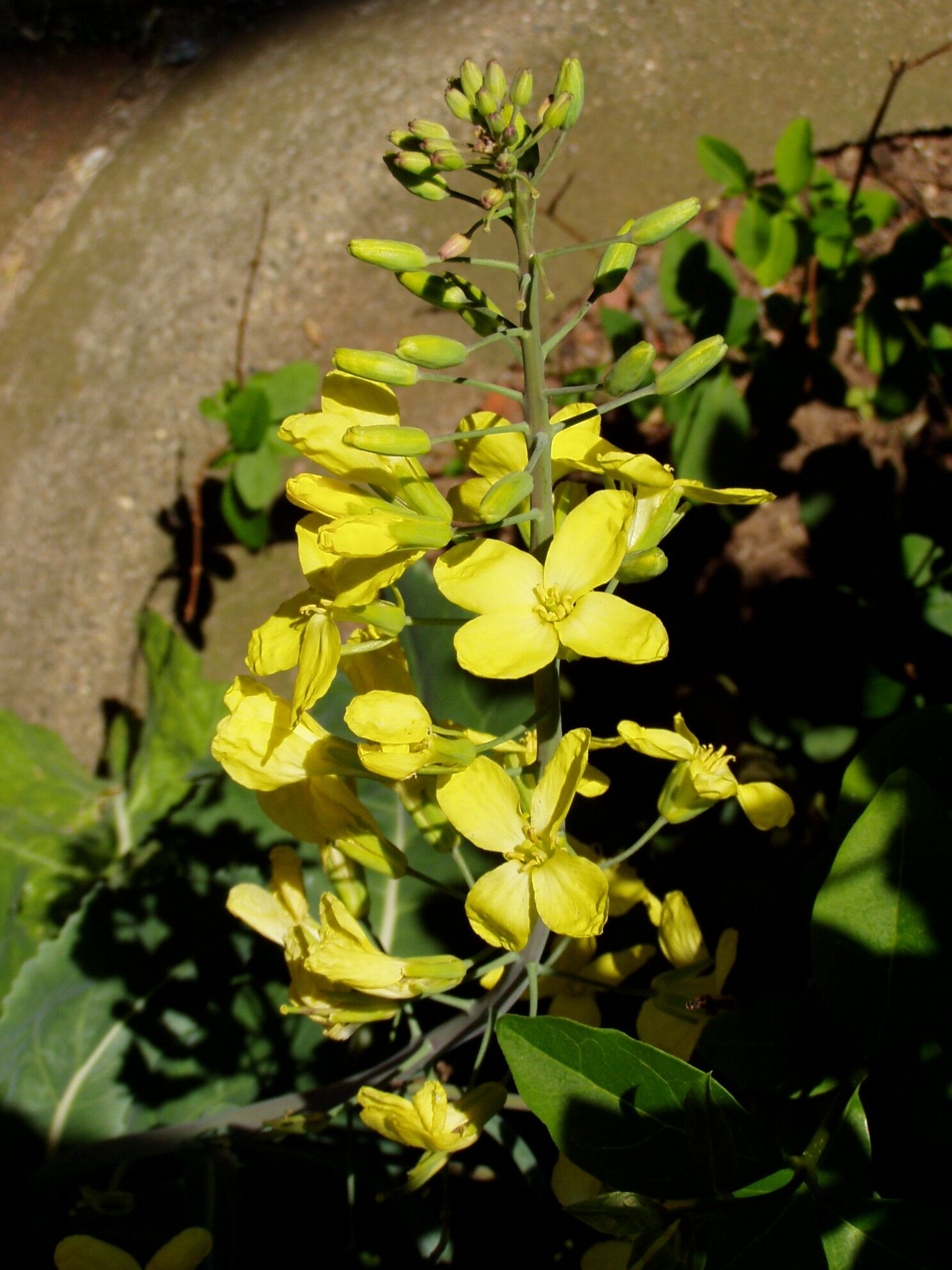
The cabbage inflorescence, which appears in the plant's second year of growth, features white or yellow flowers, each with four perpendicularly arranged petals.

Cabbage seedlings have a thin taproot and cordate, or heart-shaped cotyledons. The first leaves produced are ovate (egg-shaped) with a lobed petiole. Plants are 40–60 centimetres (15 1/2–23 1/2 inches) tall in their first year at the mature vegetative stage, and 1.5–2 metres (5–6 1/2 feet) tall when flowering in the second year. Heads average between 0.5 and 4 kilograms (1 and 8 pounds), with fast-growing, earlier-maturing varieties producing smaller heads. Most cabbages have thick, alternating leaves, with margins that range from wavy or lobed to highly dissected; some varieties have a waxy bloom on the leaves. Plants have root systems that are fibrous and shallow. About 90% of the root mass is in the upper 20–30 cm (8–12 in) of soil; some lateral roots can penetrate up to 2 m (6 1/2 ft) deep.

The inflorescence is an unbranched and indeterminate terminal raceme measuring 50–100 cm (20–40 in) tall, with flowers that are yellow or white. Each flower has four petals set in a perpendicular pattern, as well as four sepals, six stamens, and a superior ovary that is two-celled and contains a single stigma and style. Two of the six stamens have shorter filaments. The fruit is a silique that opens at maturity through dehiscence to reveal brown or black seeds that are small and round in shape. Self-pollination is impossible, and plants are cross-pollinated by insects. The initial leaves form a rosette shape comprising 7 to 15 leaves, each measuring 25–35 cm (10–14 in) by 20–30 cm (8–12 in); after this, leaves with shorter petioles develop and heads form through the leaves cupping inward.

Many shapes, colors and leaf textures are found in various cultivated varieties of cabbage. Leaf types are generally divided between crinkled-leaf, loose-head savoys and smooth-leaf firm-head cabbages, while the color spectrum includes white and a range of greens and purples. Oblate, round and pointed shapes are found.

Cabbage has been selectively bred for head weight and morphological characteristics, frost hardiness, fast growth and storage ability. The appearance of the cabbage head has been given importance in selective breeding, with varieties being chosen for shape, color, firmness and other physical characteristics. Breeding objectives are now focused on increasing resistance to various insects and diseases and improving the nutritional content of cabbage. Scientific research into the genetic modification of B. oleracea crops, including cabbage, has included European Union and United States explorations of greater insect and herbicide resistance.

There are several Guinness Book of World Records entries related to cabbage, including the heaviest cabbage, at 62.71 kg (138 lb 4 oz); the heaviest red cabbage, at 31.6 kilograms (69 lb 11 oz); the longest cabbage roll, at 19.54 m (64 ft); and the largest cabbage dish, at 2,960 kg (6,526 lb).

== Taxonomy ==
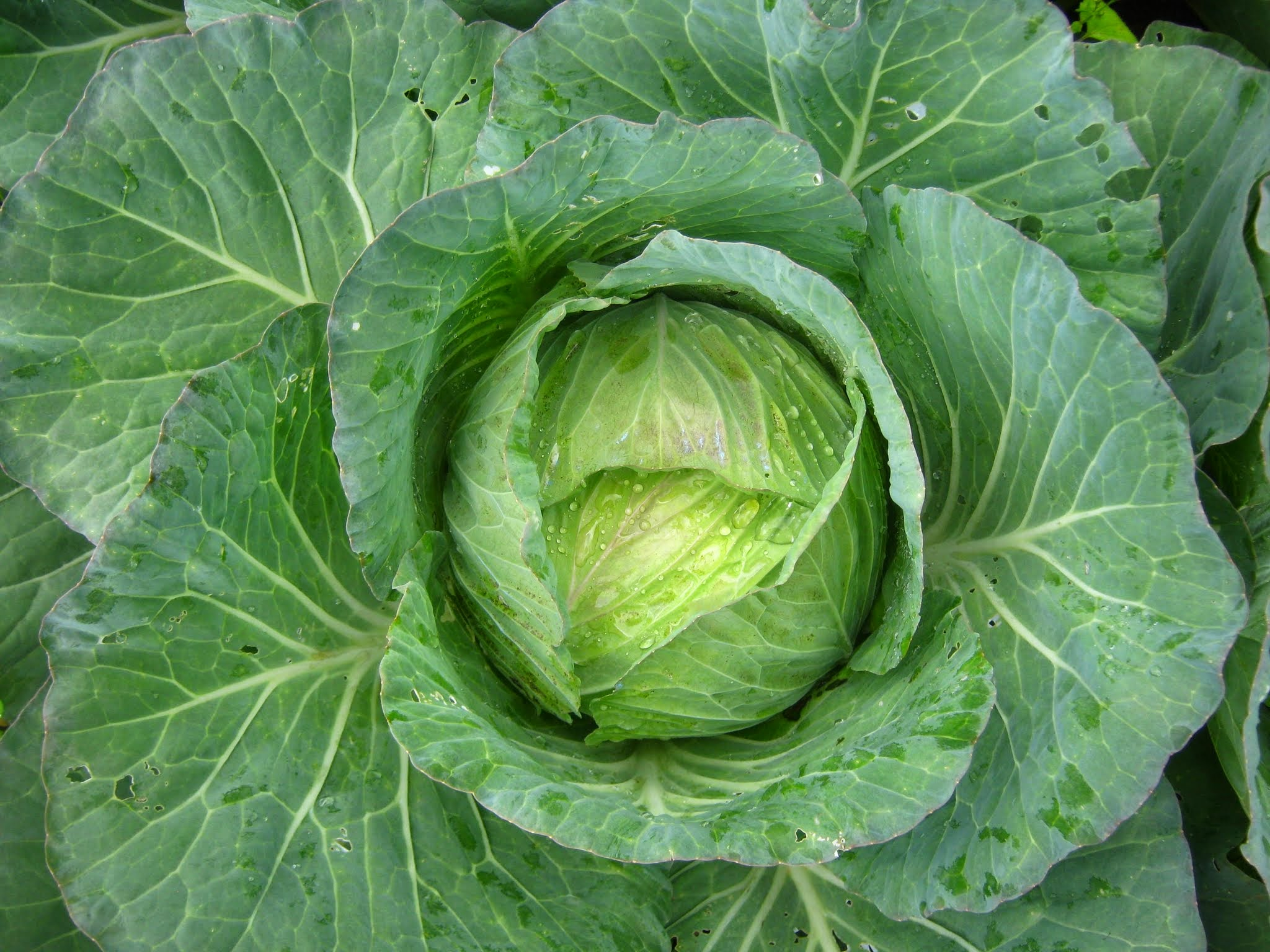
Cabbage

Cabbage (Brassica oleracea or B. oleracea var. capitata, var. tuba, var. sabauda or var. acephala) is a member of the genus Brassica and the mustard family Brassicaceae. Several other cruciferous vegetables (sometimes known as cole crops) are cultivars of B. oleracea, including broccoli, collard greens, brussels sprouts, kohlrabi and sprouting broccoli. All of these developed from the wild cabbage B. oleracea var. oleracea, also called colewort or field cabbage. This original species evolved over thousands of years into those seen today, as selection resulted in cultivars having different characteristics, such as large heads for cabbage, large leaves for kale and thick stems with flower buds for broccoli.

"Cabbage" was originally used to refer to multiple forms of B. oleracea, including those with loose or non-existent heads. A related species, Brassica rapa, is commonly named Chinese, napa or celery cabbage, and has many of the same uses. It is also a part of common names for several unrelated species. These include cabbage bark or cabbage tree (a member of the genus Andira) and cabbage palms, which include several genera of palms such as Mauritia, Roystonea oleracea, Acrocomia and Euterpe oenocarpus.

=== Etymology ===
The original family name of brassicas was Cruciferae, which derived from the flower petal pattern thought by medieval Europeans to resemble a crucifix. The word brassica derives from bresic, a Celtic word for cabbage. The varietal epithet capitata is derived from the Latin word for 'having a head'.

Many European and Asiatic names for cabbage are derived from the Celto-Slavic root cap or kap, meaning "head". The late Middle English word cabbage derives from the word caboche ("head"), from the Picard dialect of Old French. This in turn is a variant of the Old French caboce.

== Cultivation ==
=== History ===
Although cabbage has an extensive history, it is difficult to trace its exact origins owing to the many varieties of leafy greens classified as "brassicas". A possible wild ancestor of cabbage, Brassica oleracea, originally found in Britain and continental Europe, is tolerant of salt but not encroachment by other plants and consequently inhabits rocky cliffs in cool damp coastal habitats, retaining water and nutrients in its slightly thickened, turgid leaves. However, genetic analysis is consistent with feral origin of this population, deriving from plants escaped from fields and gardens. According to the triangle of U theory of the evolution and relationships between Brassica species, B. oleracea and other closely related kale vegetables (cabbages, kale, broccoli, Brussels sprouts, and cauliflower) represent one of three ancestral lines from which all other brassicas originated.

Cabbage was probably domesticated later in history than Near Eastern crops such as lentils and summer wheat. Because of the wide range of crops developed from the wild B. oleracea, multiple broadly contemporaneous domestications of cabbage may have occurred throughout Europe. Nonheading cabbages and kale were probably the first to be domesticated, before 1000 BC, perhaps by the Celts of central and western Europe, although recent linguistic and genetic evidence enforces a Mediterranean origin of cultivated brassicas.

While unidentified brassicas were part of the highly conservative unchanging Mesopotamian garden repertory, it is believed that the ancient Egyptians did not cultivate cabbage, which is not native to the Nile valley, though the word shaw't in Papyrus Harris of the time of Ramesses III has been interpreted as "cabbage". The ancient Greeks had some varieties of cabbage, as mentioned by Theophrastus, although whether they were more closely related to today's cabbage or to one of the other Brassica crops is unknown. The headed cabbage variety was known to the Greeks as krambe and to the Romans as brassica or olus; the open, leafy variety (kale) was known in Greek as raphanos and in Latin as caulis. Ptolemaic Egyptians knew the cole crops as gramb, under the influence of Greek krambe, which had been a familiar plant to the Macedonian antecedents of the Ptolemies. By early Roman times, Egyptian artisans and children were eating cabbage and turnips among a wide variety of other vegetables and pulses.

Chrysippus of Cnidos wrote a treatise on cabbage, which Pliny knew, but it has not survived. The Greeks were convinced that cabbages and grapevines were inimical, and that cabbage planted too near the vine would impart its unwelcome odor to the grapes; this Mediterranean sense of antipathy survives today.

Brassica was considered by some Romans a table luxury, although Lucullus considered it unfit for the senatorial table. The more traditionalist Cato the Elder, espousing a simple Republican life, ate his cabbage cooked or raw and dressed with vinegar; he said it surpassed all other vegetables, and approvingly distinguished three varieties; he also gave directions for its medicinal use, which extended to the cabbage-eater's urine, in which infants might be rinsed. Pliny the Elder listed seven varieties, including Pompeii cabbage, Cumae cabbage and Sabellian cabbage.

According to Pliny, the Pompeii cabbage, which could not stand cold, is "taller, and has a thick stock near the root, but grows thicker between the leaves, these being scantier and narrower, but their tenderness is a valuable quality". The Pompeii cabbage was also mentioned by Columella in De Re Rustica. Apicius gives several recipes for cauliculi, tender cabbage shoots. The Greeks and Romans claimed medicinal usages for their cabbage varieties that included relief from gout, headaches and the symptoms of poisonous mushroom ingestion.

The antipathy towards the vine made it seem that eating cabbage would enable one to avoid drunkenness. Cabbage continued to figure in the materia medica of antiquity as well as at table: in the first century AD Dioscorides mentions two kinds of coleworts with medical uses, the cultivated and the wild, and his opinions continued to be paraphrased in herbals right through the 17th century.

At the end of Antiquity cabbage is mentioned in De observatione ciborum ("On the Observance of Foods") by Anthimus, a Greek doctor at the court of Theodoric the Great. Cabbage appears among vegetables directed to be cultivated in the Capitulare de villis, composed in 771–800 AD, that guided the governance of the royal estates of Charlemagne.

In Britain, the Anglo-Saxons cultivated cawel. When round-headed cabbages appeared in 14th-century England they were called cabaches and caboches, words drawn from Old French and applied at first to refer to the ball of unopened leaves, the contemporaneous recipe that commences "Take cabbages and quarter them, and seethe them in good broth", also suggests the tightly headed cabbage.

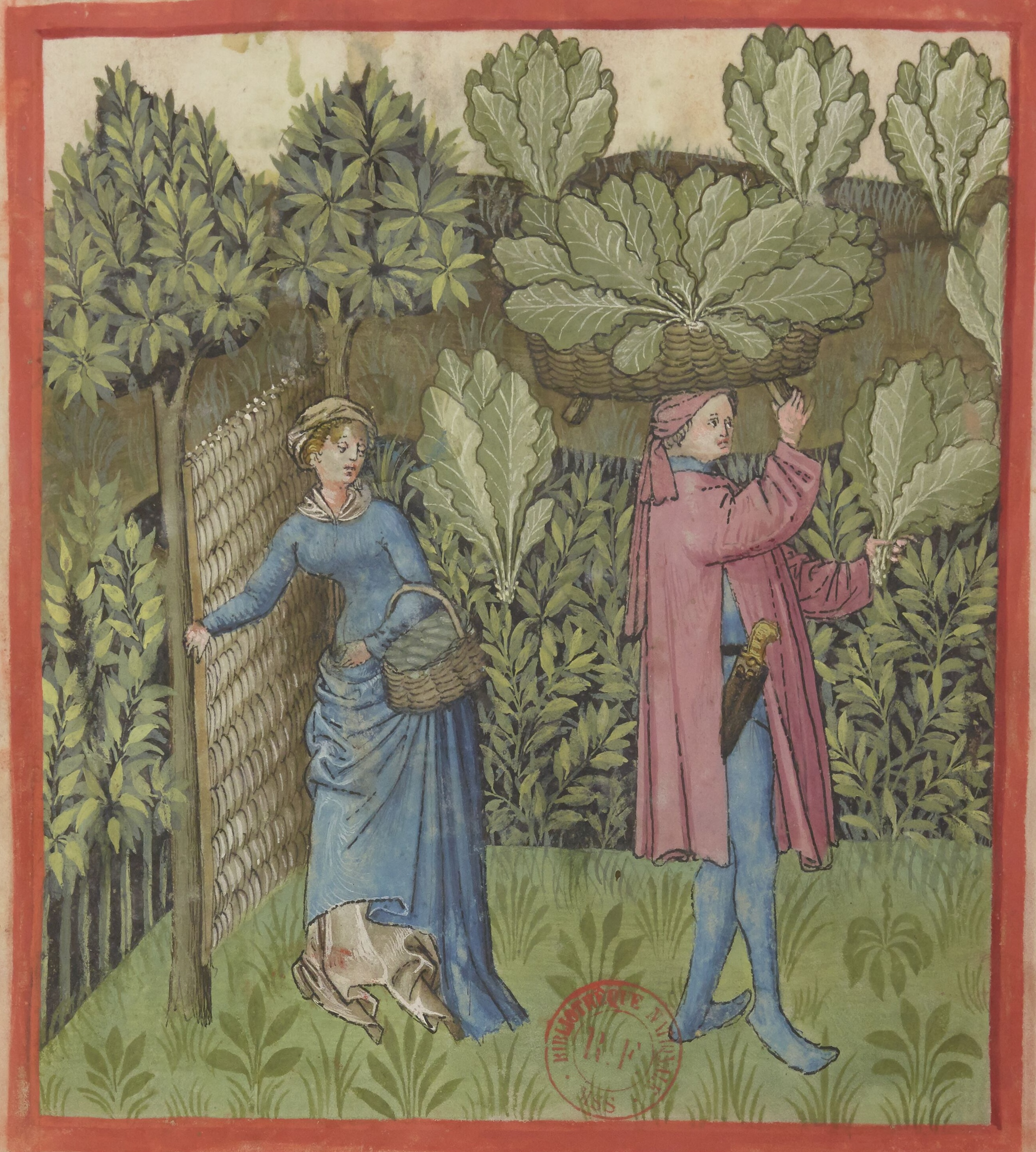
Harvesting cabbage, Tacuinum Sanitatis, 15th century

Manuscript illuminations show the prominence of cabbage in the cuisine of the High Middle Ages, and cabbage seeds feature among the seed list of purchases for the use of King John II of France when captive in England in 1360, but cabbages were also a familiar staple of the poor: in the lean year of 1420 the "Bourgeois of Paris" noted that "poor people ate no bread, nothing but cabbages and turnips and such dishes, without any bread or salt". French naturalist Jean Ruel made what is considered the first explicit mention of head cabbage in his 1536 botanical treatise De Natura Stirpium, referring to it as capucos coles ("head-coles").

In Istanbul, Sultan Selim III penned a tongue-in-cheek ode to cabbage: without cabbage, the halva feast was not complete. In India, cabbage was one of several vegetable crops introduced by colonizing traders from Portugal, who established trade routes from the 14th to 17th centuries. Carl Peter Thunberg reported that cabbage was not yet known in Japan in 1775.

Many cabbage varieties—including some still commonly grown—were introduced in Germany, France, and the Low Countries. During the 16th century, German gardeners developed the savoy cabbage. During the 17th and 18th centuries, cabbage was a food staple in such countries as Germany, England, Ireland and Russia, and pickled cabbage was frequently eaten. Sauerkraut was used by Dutch, Scandinavian and German sailors to prevent scurvy during long ship voyages.

Jacques Cartier first brought cabbage to the Americas in 1541–42, and it was probably planted by the early English colonists, despite the lack of written evidence of its existence there until the mid-17th century. By the 18th century, it was commonly planted by both colonists and native American Indians. Cabbage seeds traveled to Australia in 1788 with the First Fleet, and were planted the same year on Norfolk Island. It became a favorite vegetable of Australians by the 1830s and was frequently seen at the Sydney Markets. In Brno, Czech Republic there is an open-air market named after cabbage which has been in operation since 1325, the Zelný trh.

=== Modern cultivation ===
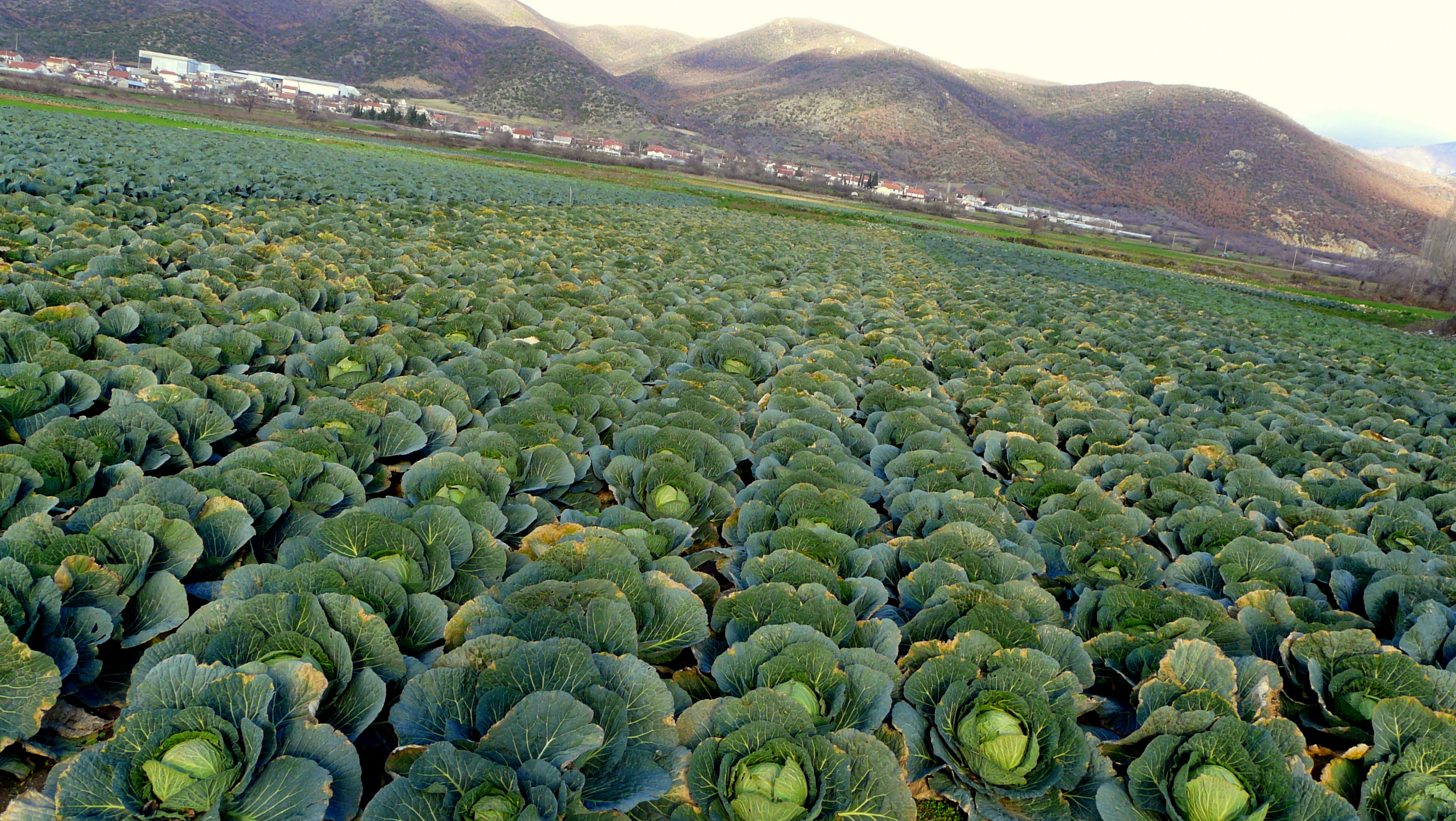
A cabbage field in North Macedonia

Cabbage is generally grown for its densely leaved heads, produced during the first year of its biennial cycle. Plants perform best when grown in well-drained soil in a location that receives full sun. Different varieties prefer different soil types, ranging from lighter sand to heavier clay, but all prefer fertile ground with a pH between 6.0 and 6.8. For optimal growth, there must be adequate levels of nitrogen in the soil, especially during the early head formation stage, and sufficient phosphorus and potassium during the early stages of expansion of the outer leaves.

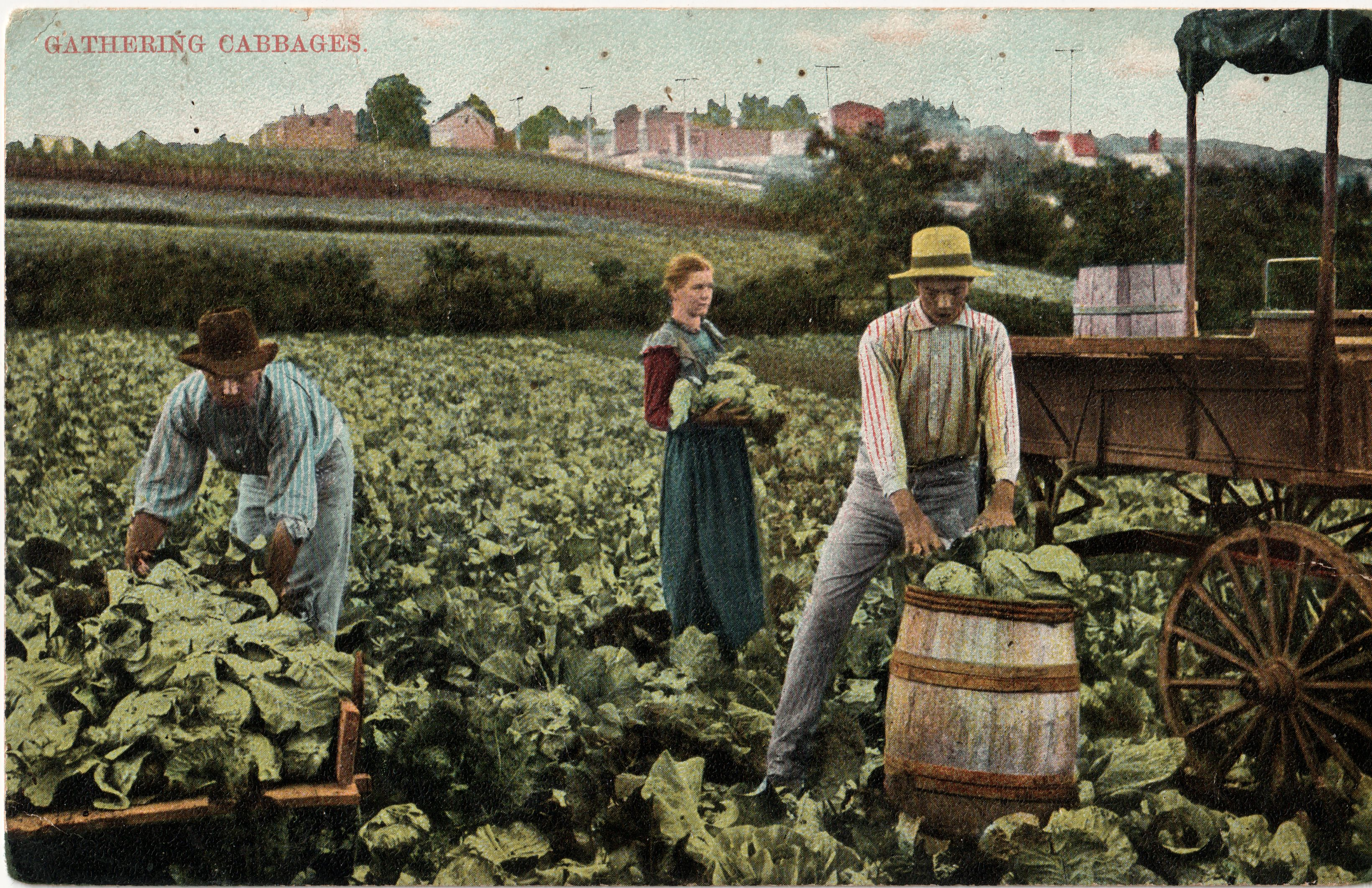
Gathering cabbages in the US, early 20th century

Temperatures between 4 and 24 °C (39 and 75 °F) prompt the best growth, and extended periods of higher or lower temperatures may result in premature bolting (flowering). Flowering induced by periods of low temperatures (a process called vernalization) only occurs if the plant is past the juvenile period. The transition from a juvenile to adult state happens when the stem diameter is about 6 mm (1/4 in). Vernalization allows the plant to grow to an adequate size before flowering. In certain climates, cabbage can be planted at the beginning of the cold period and survive until a later warm period without being induced to flower, a practice that was common in the eastern US.

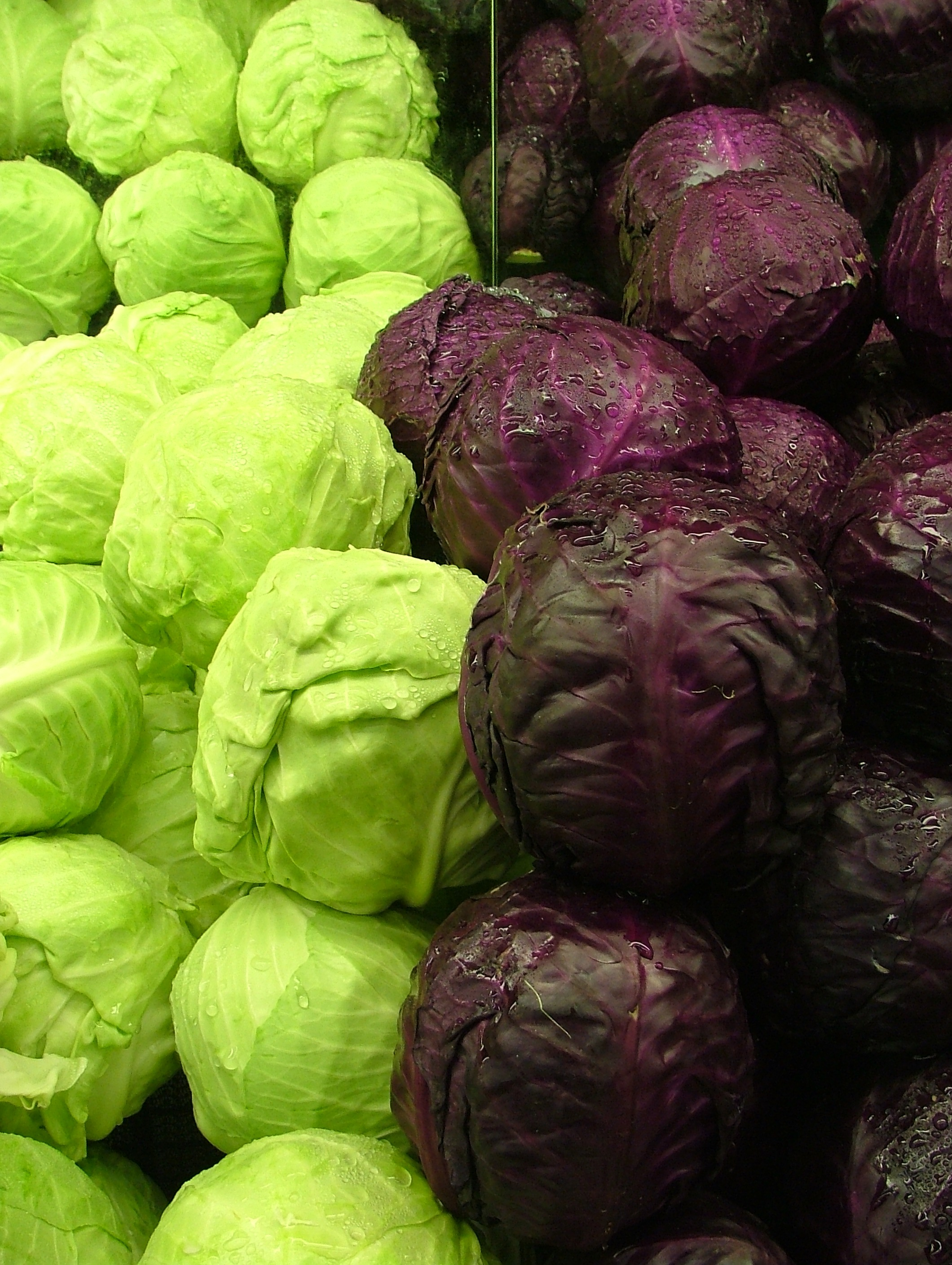
Green and purple cabbages

Plants are generally started in protected locations early in the growing season before being transplanted outside, although some are seeded directly into the ground from which they will be harvested. Seedlings typically emerge in about 4–6 days from seeds planted 13 mm (1/2 in) deep at a soil temperature between 20 and 30 °C (68 and 86 °F). Growers normally place plants 30 to 61 cm (12 to 24 in) apart. Closer spacing reduces the resources available to each plant (especially the amount of light) and increases the time taken to reach maturity.

Some varieties of cabbage have been developed for ornamental use; these are generally called "flowering cabbage". They do not produce heads and feature purple or green outer leaves surrounding an inner grouping of smaller leaves in white, red, or pink. Early varieties of cabbage take about 70 days from planting to reach maturity, while late varieties take about 120 days.

Cabbages are mature when they are firm and solid to the touch. They are harvested by cutting the stalk just below the bottom leaves with a blade. The outer leaves are trimmed, and any diseased, damaged, or necrotic leaves are removed. Delays in harvest can result in the head splitting as a result of expansion of the inner leaves and continued stem growth.

When being grown for seed, cabbages must be isolated from other B. oleracea subspecies, including the wild varieties, by 0.8 to 1.6 km (1/2 to 1 mi) to prevent cross-pollination. Other Brassica species, such as B. rapa, B. juncea, B. nigra, B. napus and Raphanus sativus, do not readily cross-pollinate.

=== Cultivars ===
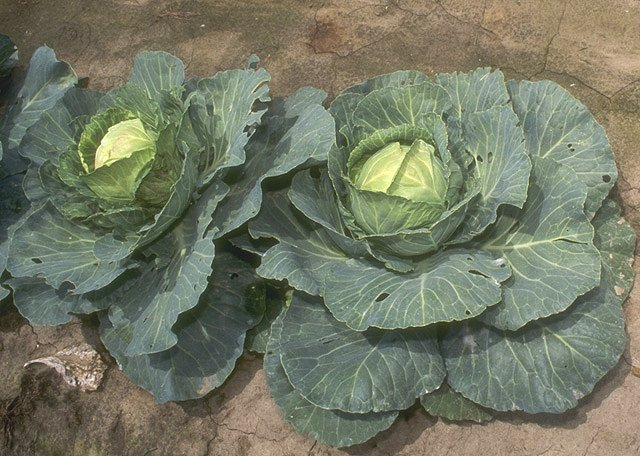
White cabbage

There are several cultivar groups of cabbage, each including many cultivars:

- Savoy – Characterized by crimped or curly leaves, mild flavor and tender texture
- Spring greens – Loose-headed, commonly sliced and steamed
- Green – Light to dark green, slightly pointed heads.
- Red – Smooth red leaves, often used for pickling or stewing
- White, also called Dutch – Smooth, pale green leaves

Some sources only delineate three cultivars: savoy, red and white, with spring greens and green cabbage being subsumed under the last.

=== Cultivation problems ===
Due to its high level of nutrient requirements, cabbage is prone to nutrient deficiencies, including boron, calcium, phosphorus and potassium. There are several physiological disorders that can affect the postharvest appearance of cabbage. Internal tip burn occurs when the margins of inside leaves turn brown, but the outer leaves look normal. Necrotic spot is where there are oval sunken spots a few millimeters across that are often grouped around the midrib. In pepper spot, tiny black spots occur on the areas between the veins, which can increase during storage.

Fungal diseases include wirestem, which causes weak or dying transplants; Fusarium yellows, which result in stunted and twisted plants with yellow leaves; and blackleg (see Leptosphaeria maculans), which leads to sunken areas on stems and gray-brown spotted leaves. The fungi Alternaria brassicae and A. brassicicola cause dark leaf spots in affected plants. They are both seedborne and airborne, and typically propagate from spores in infected plant debris left on the soil surface for up to twelve weeks after harvest. Rhizoctonia solani causes the post-emergence disease wirestem, resulting in killed seedlings ("damping-off"), root rot or stunted growth and smaller heads.

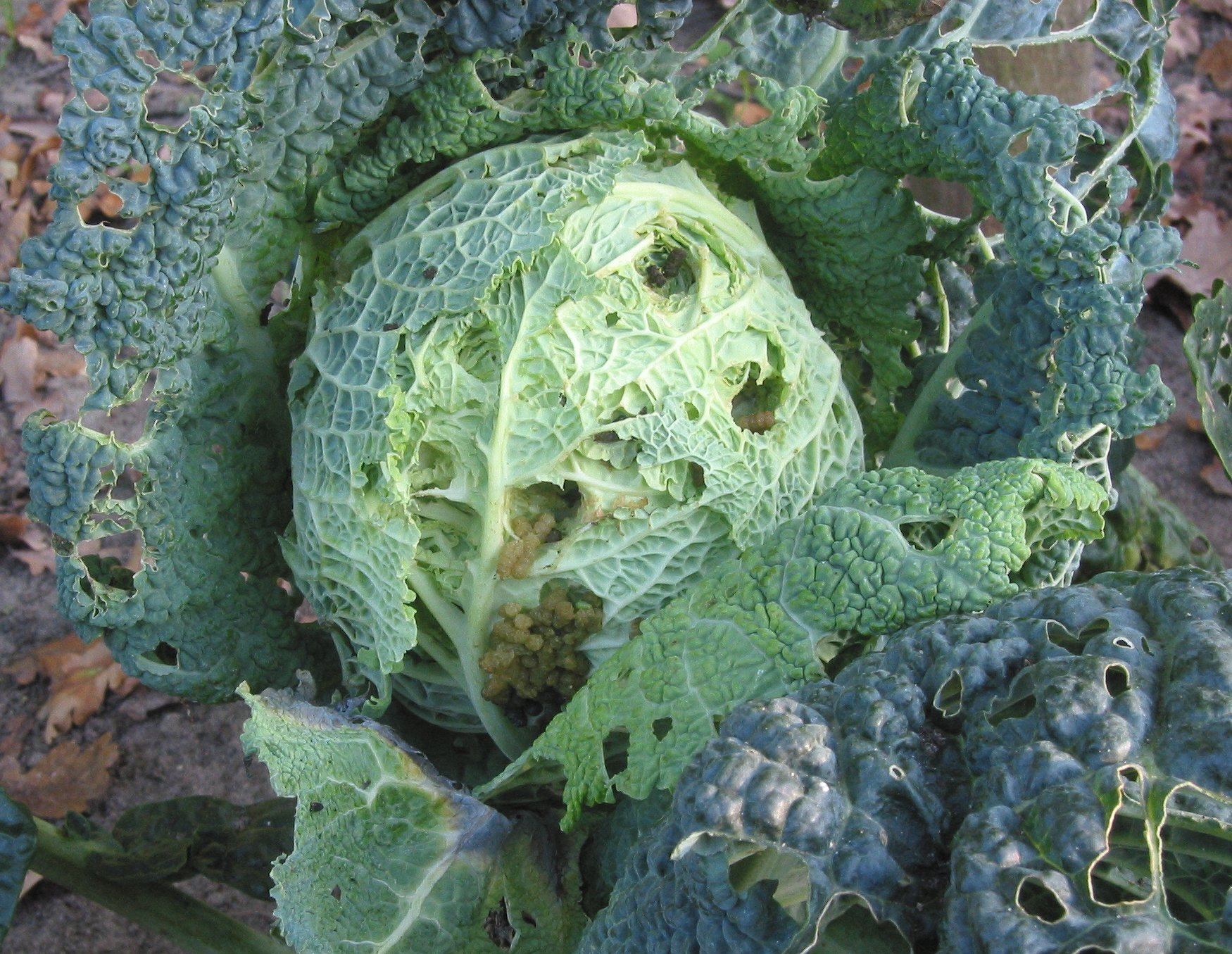
Cabbage moth damage to a savoy cabbage

One of the most common bacterial diseases to affect cabbage is black rot, caused by Xanthomonas campestris, which causes chlorotic and necrotic lesions that start at the leaf margins, and wilting of plants. Clubroot, caused by the soilborne slime mold-like organism Plasmodiophora brassicae, results in swollen, club-like roots. Downy mildew, a parasitic disease caused by the oomycete Peronospora parasitica, produces pale leaves with white, brownish or olive mildew on the lower leaf surfaces; this is often confused with the fungal disease powdery mildew.

Pests include root-knot nematodes and cabbage maggots, which produce stunted and wilted plants with yellow leaves; aphids, which induce stunted plants with curled and yellow leaves; harlequin cabbage bugs, which cause white and yellow leaves; thrips, which lead to leaves with white-bronze spots; striped flea beetles, which riddle leaves with small holes; and caterpillars, which leave behind large, ragged holes in leaves. Delia platura, or the seedcorn maggot, is also a known pest of cabbage. The caterpillar stage of the "small cabbage white butterfly" (Pieris rapae), commonly known in the United States as the "imported cabbage worm", is a major cabbage pest in most countries.

The large white butterfly (Pieris brassicae) is prevalent in eastern European countries. The diamondback moth (Plutella xylostella) and the cabbage moth (Mamestra brassicae) thrive in the higher summer temperatures of continental Europe, where they cause considerable damage to cabbage crops. The mustard leaf beetle (Phaedon cochleariae), is a common pest of cabbage plants. The mustard leaf beetle will often choose to feed on cabbage over their natural host plants as cabbage is more abundant in palatable compounds such as glucosinolates that encourage higher consumption. The cabbage looper (Trichoplusia ni) is infamous in North America for its voracious appetite and for producing frass that contaminates plants. In India, the diamondback moth has caused losses up to 90 percent in crops that were not treated with insecticide. Destructive soil insects such as the cabbage root fly (Delia radicum) has larvae can burrow into the part of plant consumed by humans.

Planting near other members of the cabbage family, or where these plants have been placed in previous years, can prompt the spread of pests and disease. Excessive water and excessive heat can also cause cultivation problems.

Factors that contribute to reduced head weight include: growth in the compacted soils that result from no-till farming practices, drought, waterlogging, insect and disease incidence, and shading and nutrient stress caused by weeds.

=== Production ===
Cabbage production 2023, millions of tonnes
| China | 35.5 |
| India | 10.0 |
| Russia | 2.6 |
| South Korea | 2.5 |
| Ukraine | 1.6 |
| World | 73.8 |
Source: FAOSTAT of the United Nations

In 2023, world production of cabbages was 74 million tonnes, led by China with 48% of the total (table). Other substantial producers were India, Russia, and South Korea.

Production of cabbages

Cabbage yield

== Toxicity ==
When overcooked, toxic hydrogen sulfide gas is produced.

Excessive consumption of cabbage may lead to increased intestinal gas (which causes bloating and flatulence) due to the trisaccharide raffinose, which the human small intestine cannot digest, but is digested by bacteria in the large intestine.

Cabbage has been linked to outbreaks of some food-borne illnesses, including Listeria monocytogenes and Clostridium botulinum. The latter toxin has been traced to pre-made, packaged coleslaw mixes, while the spores were found on whole cabbages that were otherwise acceptable in appearance. Shigella species are able to survive in shredded cabbage. Two outbreaks of E. coli in the United States have been linked to cabbage consumption. Biological risk assessments have concluded that there is the potential for further outbreaks linked to uncooked cabbage, due to contamination at many stages of the growing, harvesting and packaging processes. Contaminants from water, humans, animals and soil have the potential to be transferred to cabbage, and from there to the end consumer.

Whilst not a toxic vegetable in its natural state, an increase in intestinal gas can lead to the death of many small animals like rabbits due to gastrointestinal stasis.

Cabbage and other cruciferous vegetables contain small amounts of thiocyanate, a compound associated with goiter formation when iodine intake is deficient.

== Uses ==
=== Culinary ===
The characteristic flavor of cabbage is caused by glucosinolates, a class of sulfur-containing glucosides. Although found throughout the plant, these compounds are concentrated in the highest quantities in the seeds; lesser quantities are found in young vegetative tissue, and they decrease as the tissue ages. Cooked cabbage is often criticized for its pungent, unpleasant odor and taste. These develop when cabbage is overcooked and hydrogen sulfide gas is produced.

Cabbage consumption varies widely around the world: Russia has the highest annual per capita consumption at 20 kg (44 lb), followed by Belgium at 4.7 kg (10 lb 6 oz) and the Netherlands at 4.0 kg (8 lb 13 oz). Americans consume 3.9 kg (8.6 lb) annually per capita.

Cabbage, raw
Nutritional value per 100 g (3.5 oz)
- Energy: 103 kJ (25 kcal)
- Carbohydrates: 5.8 g
- Sugars: 3.2 g
- Dietary fiber: 2.5 g
- Fat: 0.1 g
- Protein: 1.28 g
Vitamins and minerals
| Vitamins | Quantity %DV^{†} |
| Thiamine (B1) | 5% 0.061 mg |
| Riboflavin (B2) | 3% 0.040 mg |
| Niacin (B3) | 1% 0.234 mg |
| Pantothenic acid (B5) | 4% 0.212 mg |
| Vitamin B6 | 7% 0.124 mg |
| Folate (B9) | 11% 43 μg |
| Vitamin C | 41% 36.6 mg |
| Vitamin K | 63% 76 μg |
| Minerals | Quantity %DV^{†} |
| Calcium | 3% 40 mg |
| Iron | 3% 0.47 mg |
| Magnesium | 3% 12 mg |
| Manganese | 7% 0.16 mg |
| Phosphorus | 2% 26 mg |
| Potassium | 6% 170 mg |
| Sodium | 1% 18 mg |
| Zinc | 2% 0.18 mg |
- Other constituents: Quantity
- Water: 92 g
- Link to USDA Database entry
- ^{†}Percentages estimated using US recommendations for adults, except for potassium, which is estimated based on expert recommendation from the National Academies.

=== Nutrition ===
Raw cabbage is 93% water, 6% carbohydrates, 1% protein, and contains negligible fat (table). In a reference amount of 100 g (3.5 oz), raw cabbage supplies 25 calories, and is a rich source of vitamin C and vitamin K, containing 41% and 63%, respectively, of the Daily Value (DV, table), and a moderate source of folate (11% DV), with no other micronutrients in significant content.

=== Local market and storage ===
Cabbages sold for market are generally smaller, and different varieties are used for those sold immediately upon harvest and those stored before sale. Those used for processing, especially sauerkraut, are larger and have a lower percentage of water. Both hand and mechanical harvesting are used, and hand-harvesting is generally used for cabbages destined for market sales. In commercial-scale operations, hand-harvested cabbages are trimmed, sorted, and packed directly in the field to increase efficiency.

Vacuum cooling rapidly refrigerates the vegetable, allowing for earlier shipping and a fresher product. Cabbage can be stored the longest at −1 to 2 °C (30 to 36 °F) with a humidity of 90–100%; these conditions will result in up to six months of longevity. When stored under less ideal conditions, cabbage can still last up to four months.

=== Food preparation ===
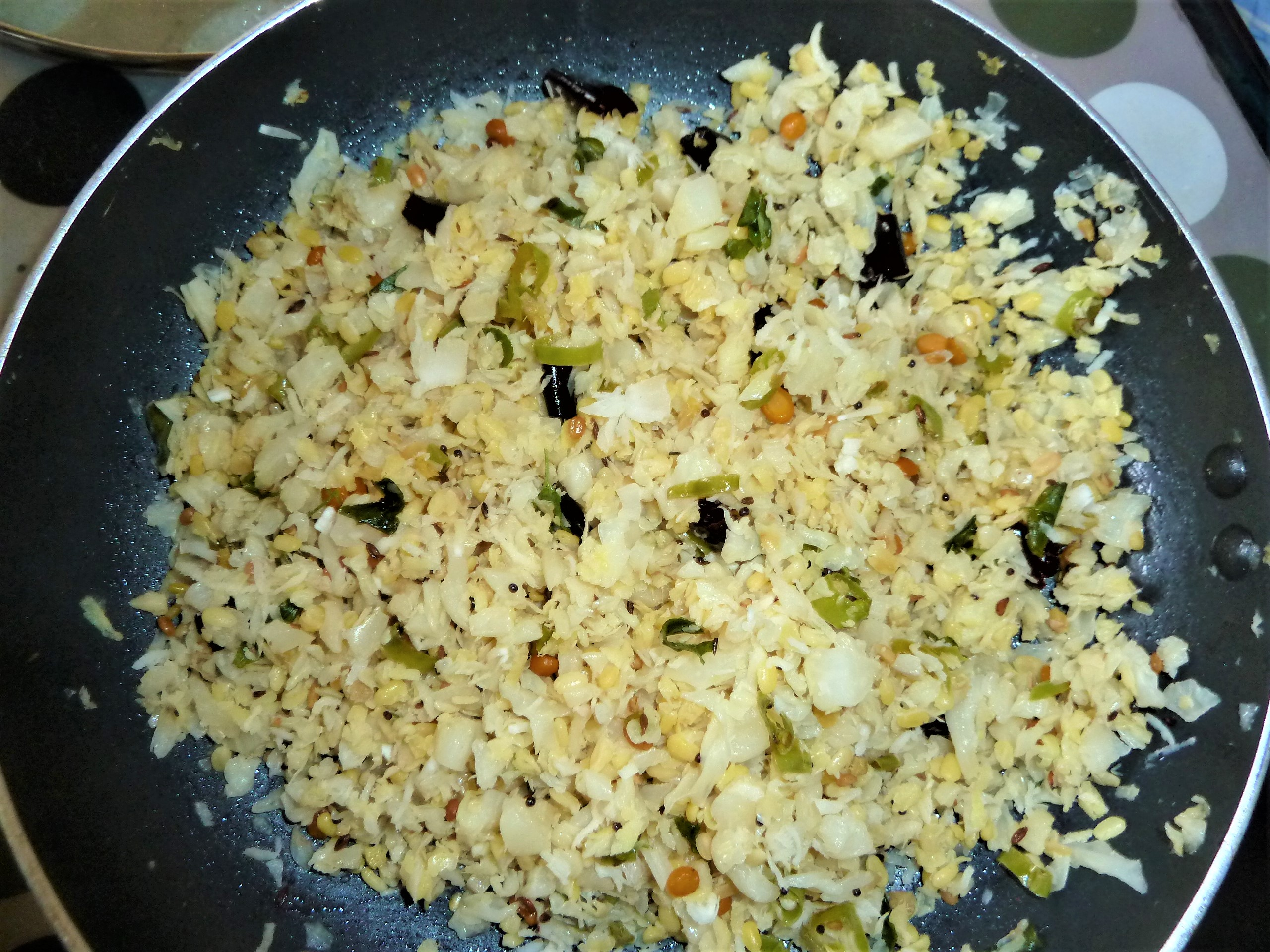
Cabbage with moong-dal curry

Cabbage is prepared and consumed in many ways. The simplest options include eating the vegetable raw or steaming it, though many cuisines pickle, stew, sauté or braise cabbage. Savoy cabbages are usually used in salads. Smooth-leaf types are both sold to consumers and used for commercial processing.

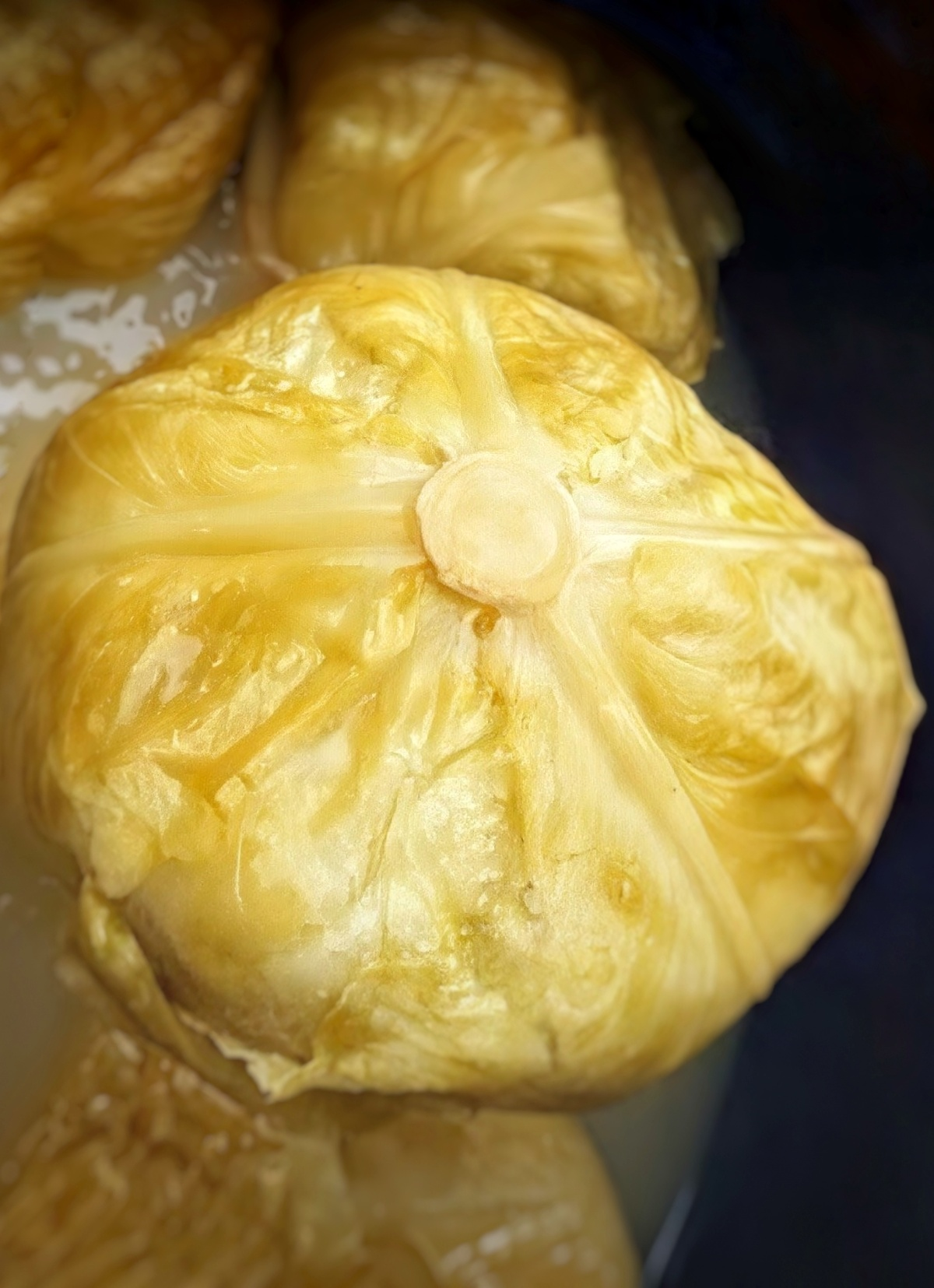
Whole sour cabbage in a barrel with brine

Pickling is a common way of preserving cabbage, creating dishes such as sauerkraut and kimchi, although kimchi is more often made from napa cabbage (a related but separate species).

In Poland, cabbage is one of the main food crops, and it features prominently in Polish cuisine. It is frequently eaten, either cooked or as sauerkraut, as a side dish or as an ingredient in such dishes as bigos (cabbage, sauerkraut, meat, and wild mushrooms, among other ingredients), gołąbki (stuffed cabbage), and pierogi (filled dumplings). Other central and eastern European countries, such as Hungary and Romania, also have traditional dishes that feature cabbage as a main ingredient.

Tofu and cabbage is a staple of Chinese cooking, while the British dish bubble and squeak is made primarily with leftover potato and boiled cabbage and eaten with cold meat. In India and Ethiopia, cabbage is often included in spicy salads and braises. In the United States, cabbage is used primarily for the production of coleslaw, followed by market use and sauerkraut production.

=== Phytochemicals and cancer research ===
Phytochemicals in cabbage and other cruciferous vegetables, including such compounds as isothiocyanates, sulforaphane, and other glucosinolates, are under basic research to determine their possible biological effects.

Although the relationship between a diet rich in cruciferous vegetables and the risk of cancer has been widely studied, there remains insufficient evidence that consuming cabbage compounds decreases cancer risk, as of 2024.

In a 2021 study, cabbage was suggested as valuable for its prohibitive and restoring effects in type 2 diabetes.

=== Herbalism ===
In addition to its usual purpose as an edible vegetable, cabbage has been used historically in herbalism. The Ancient Greeks recommended consuming the vegetable as a laxative, and used cabbage juice as an antidote for mushroom poisoning, for eye salves, and for liniments for bruises. The ancient Roman, Pliny the Elder, described both culinary and medicinal properties of the vegetable. Ancient Egyptians ate cooked cabbage at the beginning of meals to reduce the intoxicating effects of wine. This traditional usage persisted in European literature until the mid-20th century.

The supposed cooling properties of the leaves were used in Britain as a treatment for trench foot in World War I, and as compresses for ulcers and breast abscesses. Other medicinal uses recorded in European folk medicine include treatments for rheumatism, sore throat, hoarseness, colic, and melancholy. Both mashed cabbage and cabbage juice have been used in poultices to remove boils and treat warts, pneumonia, appendicitis, and ulcers.

== See also ==
- List of cabbage dishes

== Works cited ==
- Bradley, Fern Marshall; Ellis, Barbara W.; Martin, Deborah L., eds. (2009). The Organic Gardener's Handbook of Natural Pest and Disease Control. Rodale, Inc. ISBN 978-1-60529-677-7.
- Dixon, Geoffrey R. (2007). Vegetable Brassicas and Related Crucifers. Crop Production Science in Horticulture. Vol. 14. CAB International. ISBN 978-0-85199-395-9.
- Janick, Jules (2011). Plant Breeding Reviews. Vol. 35. John Wiley & Sons. ISBN 978-1-118-10049-3.
- Katz, Solomon H; Weaver, William Woys (2003). Encyclopedia of Food and Culture. Vol. 2. Scribner. ISBN 978-0-684-80565-8.
- Maynard, Donald N.; Hochmuth, George J. (2007). Knott's Handbook for Vegetable Growers (5th ed.). Wiley. ISBN 978-0-471-73828-2.
- Ordas, Amando; Cartea, M. Elena (2008). "Cabbage and Kale". In Prohens, J.; Nuez, F (eds.). Vegetables I: Asteraceae, Brassicaceae, Chenopodiaceae, and Cucurbitaceae. Vol. 2. Springer. ISBN 978-0-387-72291-7.
- Tannahill, Reay (1973). Food in History. Stein and Day. ISBN 978-0-8128-1437-8.
- Toussaint-Samat, Maguelonne (2009). A History of Food (2nd ed.). Wiley-Blackwell. ISBN 978-1405181198.
- Wien, H. C.; Wurr, D. C. E. (1997). "Cauliflower, broccoli, cabbage and brussel sprouts". In Wien, H. C. (ed.). The Physiology of Vegetable Crops. CAB International. ISBN 978-0-85199-146-7.
