= Isothiocyanate =

Chemical group (–N=C=S)

General structure of an isothiocyanate.

In organic chemistry, isothiocyanate is a functional group as found in compounds with the formula R−N=C=S. Isothiocyanates are the more common isomers of thiocyanates, which have the formula R−S−C≡N.

== Occurrence ==
Many isothiocyanates from plants are produced by enzymatic conversion of metabolites called glucosinolates. A prominent natural isothiocyanate is allyl isothiocyanate, also known as mustard oils.

Cruciferous vegetables, such as bok choy, broccoli, cabbage, cauliflower, kale, and others, are rich sources of glucosinolate precursors of isothiocyanates.

== Structure ==
The N=C and C=S distances are 117 and 158 pm. By contrast, in methyl thiocyanate, N≡C and C−S distances are 116 and 176 pm.

Typical bond angles for C−N=C in aryl isothiocyanates are near 165°. Again, the thiocyanate isomers are quite different with C−S−C angle near 100°. In both isomers the SCN angle approaches 180°.

== Synthesis ==
Isothiocyanates can be prepared by treating organic dithiocarbamate salts with lead nitrate or tosyl chloride:

Synthesis of phenyl isothiocyanate

They generally cannot be prepared from alkylation of thiocyanate salts, as the ion's S terminus is much more nucleophilic. However, stabilized carbocations can reionize and rearrange to the thermodynamically preferred isothiocyanate. For example, allyl thiocyanate isomerizes to the isothiocyanate:

CH_{2}=CHCH_{2}SCN → CH_{2}=CHCH_{2}NCS

Isothiocyanates may also be accessed by the fragmentation reactions of 1,4,2-oxathiazoles, themselves a product of a nitrile oxide and a thiocarbonyl.

In biology, the mustard oil bomb forms isothiocyanates through a variation on the Lossen rearrangement (uncatalyzed).

In the presence of thallous acetate, sufficiently strong-acid disulfide esters (e.g. bis(para‑nitrobenzoyl) disulfide) react with isocyanides to give isothiocyanates.

== Reactions ==
Isothiocyanates are weak electrophiles, susceptible to hydrolysis. They are much less reactive than structurally analogous isocyanates.

In general, nucleophiles attack at carbon:

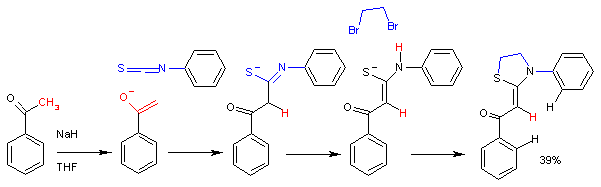
The reaction of acetophenone enolate with phenyl isothiocyanate. In this one-pot synthesis the ultimate reaction product is a Thiazolidine. This reaction is stereoselective with the formation of the Z-isomer only.

Electrochemical reduction gives thioformamides.

Reaction with mercuric fluoride gives the corresponding isocyanide difluoride.

== Flavor research ==
Isothiocyanates occur widely in nature and are of interest in food science and medical research. Vegetable foods with characteristic flavors due to isothiocyanates include bok choy, broccoli, cabbage, cauliflower, kale, wasabi, horseradish, mustard, radish, Brussels sprouts, watercress, papaya seeds, nasturtiums, and capers. These species generate isothiocyanates in different proportions, and so have different, but recognizably related, flavors. They are all members of the order Brassicales, which is characterized by the production of glucosinolates, and of the enzyme myrosinase, which acts on glucosinolates to release isothiocyanates.

- Sinigrin is the precursor to allyl isothiocyanate
- Glucotropaeolin is the precursor to benzyl isothiocyanate
- Gluconasturtiin is the precursor to phenethyl isothiocyanate
- Glucoraphanin is the precursor to sulforaphane

== Uses ==
Phenyl isothiocyanate, is used for amino acid sequencing in the Edman degradation.

Phenylene diisothiocyanate is an antihelminthic.

== Coordination chemistry ==
Isothiocyanate and its linkage isomer thiocyanate are ligands in coordination chemistry. Thiocyanate is a more common ligand.

== See also ==
- Methyl isothiocyanate
