= C17H14N2 =

The molecular formula C_{17}H_{14}N_{2} (molar mass: 246.31 g/mol, exact mass: 246.1157 u) may refer to:

- 3,3'-Diindolylmethane (DIM)
- Ellipticine
- Olivacine
