= Phenylalanine N-monooxygenase =

Class of enzymes

Identifiers
- EC no.: 1.14.14.40

Databases
- IntEnz: IntEnz view
- BRENDA: BRENDA entry
- ExPASy: NiceZyme view
- KEGG: KEGG entry
- MetaCyc: metabolic pathway
- PRIAM: profile
- PDB structures: RCSB PDB PDBe PDBsum
Search
- PMC: articles
- PubMed: articles
- NCBI: proteins

Phenylalanine N-monooxygenase (EC 1.14.14.40, phenylalanine N-hydroxylase, CYP79A2) is an enzyme with systematic name L-phenylalanine,NADPH:oxygen oxidoreductase (N-hydroxylating). It catalyses the following sequence of chemical reactions:

phenylalanine
+ 2 NADPH
+ 2 H^{+}
2 O_{2}
2 H_{2}O
N,N-dihydroxy-L-phenylalanine
+ 2 NADP^{+}
CO_{2} + H_{2}O
(E)-phenylacetaldoxime

The enzyme uses molecular oxygen and reduced nicotinamide adenine dinucleotide phosphate (NADPH) to convert L-phenylalanine first to its N-hydroxy derivative and then to N,N-dihydroxy-L-phenylalanine. This compound is unstable and loses carbon dioxide and water to give the (E) isomer of phenylacetaldoxime.

Phenylalanine N-monooxygenase is a cytochrome P450 protein containing heme. It is part of the pathway in plants which converts phenylalanine to the glucosinolate, glucotropaeolin, which contributes to the characteristic flavor of brassicas.
