= Desulfoglucosinolate sulfotransferase =

Class of enzymes

Identifiers
- EC no.: 2.8.2.24
- CAS no.: 121479-85-4

Databases
- BRENDA: enzyme data
- ExPASy: NiceZyme view
- KEGG: enzyme entry
- MetaCyc: metabolic pathway
- Rhea: reactions
- PDB structures: RCSB PDB PDBe PDBsum
- Gene Ontology: AmiGO / QuickGO
Search
- PMC: articles
- PubMed: articles
- NCBI: proteins

Desulfoglucosinolate sulfotransferase (EC 2.8.2.24) is an enzyme that catalyzes related chemical reactions which add a sulfate group in the final step of the biosynthesis of tryptophan- and phenylalanine-derived glucosinolates:

a precursor +
PAPS
a glucosinolate +
adenosine 3',5'-bisphosphate

It uses the cofactor 3'-phosphoadenosine-5'-phosphosulfate (PAPS) and gives adenosine 3',5'-bisphosphate as a byproduct. For example, the enzyme characterised from Brassica converts desulfoglucotropaeolin to glucotropaeolin:

desulfoglucotropaeolin
+ PAPS
glucotropaeolin
+ adenosine 3',5'-
bisphosphate

Related enzymes act to give other glucosinolates.

This enzyme is a transferase, specifically a sulfotransferase, which transfer sulfur-containing groups. The systematic name of this enzyme class is 3'-phosphoadenylyl-sulfate:desulfoglucosinolate sulfotransferase. Other names in common use include PAPS-desulfoglucosinolate sulfotransferase, 3'-phosphoadenosine-5'-phosphosulfate:desulfoglucosinolate, and sulfotransferase.
