= 3,3'-Diindolylmethane =

Chemical compound

Names
- Preferred IUPAC name 3,3′-Methylenedi(1H-indole)
- Other names 3-(1H-Indol-3-ylmethyl)-1H-indole; 3,3′-Methylenebis-1H-indole; DIM

Identifiers
CAS Number	1968-05-4
3D model (JSmol)	Interactive image
Beilstein Reference	223072
ChEBI	CHEBI:50182
ChEMBL	ChEMBL446452
ChemSpider	2963
DrugBank	DB11875
ECHA InfoCard	100.124.716
EC Number	606-355-3
IUPHAR/BPS	11208
PubChem CID	3071
UNII	SSZ9HQT61Z
CompTox Dashboard (EPA)	DTXSID8037047
- InChI: InChI=1S/C17H14N2/c1-3-7-16-14(5-1)12(10-18-16)9-13-11-19-17-8-4-2-6-15(13)17/h1-8,10-11,18-19H,9H2 Key: VFTRKSBEFQDZKX-UHFFFAOYSA-N; InChI=1/C17H14N2/c1-3-7-16-14(5-1)12(10-18-16)9-13-11-19-17-8-4-2-6-15(13)17/h1-8,10-11,18-19H,9H2; InChI=1/C17H14N2/c1-3-7-16-14(5-1)12(10-18-16)9-13-11-19-17-8-4-2-6-15(13)17/h1-8,10-11,18-19H,9H2 Key: VFTRKSBEFQDZKX-UHFFFAOYAU
- SMILES: c4ccc3c(Cc1c[nH]c2ccccc12)c[nH]c3c4

Properties
Chemical formula	C_{17}H_{14}N_{2}
Molar mass	246.313 g·mol^{−1}

Hazards
- GHS labelling
Pictograms	(GHS07: Exclamation mark)
Signal word	Warning
Hazard statements	H315, H319, H335, H413
Precautionary statements	P261, P264, P271, P273, P280, P302+P352, P304+P340, P305+P351+P338, P312, P321, P332+P313, P337+P313, P362, P403+P233, P405, P501
- Except where otherwise noted, data are given for materials in their standard state (at 25 °C [77 °F], 100 kPa). verify (what is ?) Infobox references

3,3′-Diindolylmethane (DIM) is a compound derived from the digestion of indole-3-carbinol, found in cruciferous vegetables, such as broccoli, Brussels sprouts, cabbage and kale. It and its parent compound – indole-3-carbinol – are under laboratory research to determine their possible biological properties, particularly in anti-cancer mechanisms. DIM is sold as a dietary supplement.

== Properties ==
In vitro, DIM has action as a histone deacetylase inhibitor, specifically against HDAC1, HDAC2, and HDAC3. DIM is a metabolite of indole-3-carbinol.

DIM was found to be a mild cannabinoid agonist with low binding affinity for both CB1 and CB2.

A study conducted in 2023 by researchers from Ben-Gurion University of the Negev, in collaboration with teams from Sichuan University and the National University of Singapore, found that DIM can reduce biofilms responsible for dental plaque and cavities by 90%. As of 2025, no clinical trials have been conducted that confirm the effectiveness of DIM in reducing plaque.

== See also ==
- Glucobrassicin, precursor to indole-3-carbinol
- Phytochemicals
