= Gluconasturtiin =

Names
- IUPAC name 1-S-[(1Z)-3-Phenyl-N-(sulfooxy)propanimidoyl]-1-thio-β-D-glucopyranose
- Other names Phenethyl glucosinolate

Identifiers
CAS Number	499-30-9
3D model (JSmol)	Interactive image
ChEBI	CHEBI:79347
ChemSpider	4576506
ECHA InfoCard	100.231.959
PubChem CID	5464032
UNII	163ENC977A
CompTox Dashboard (EPA)	DTXSID70964468
- InChI: InChI=1S/C15H21NO9S2/c17-8-10-12(18)13(19)14(20)15(24-10)26-11(16-25-27(21,22)23)7-6-9-4-2-1-3-5-9/h1-5,10,12-15,17-20H,6-8H2,(H,21,22,23)/b16-11-/t10-,12-,13+,14-,15+/m1/s1 Key: CKIJIGYDFNXSET-OOMJLXHVSA-N
- SMILES: c1ccc(cc1)CC/C(=N/OS(=O)(=O)O)/S[C@H]2[C@@H]([C@H]([C@@H]([C@H](O2)CO)O)O)O

Properties
Chemical formula	C_{15}H_{21}NO_{9}S_{2}
Molar mass	423.45 g·mol^{−1}
- Except where otherwise noted, data are given for materials in their standard state (at 25 °C [77 °F], 100 kPa). Infobox references

Gluconasturtiin or phenethyl glucosinolate is one of the most widely distributed glucosinolates in the cruciferous vegetables, mainly in the roots, and is probably one of the plant compounds responsible for the natural pest-inhibiting properties of growing crucifers, such as cabbage, mustard or rape, in rotation with other crops. This effect of gluconasturtiin is due to its degradation by the plant enzyme myrosinase into phenethyl isothiocyanate, which is toxic to many organisms.

Gluconasturtiin is named from its occurrence in watercress (Nasturtium officinale). Among the vegetables, it is also found in horseradish (Armoracia rusticana) along with sinigrin. Both compounds elicit a pungent taste.

== Occurrence ==
The compound was first reported in 1899, after its isolation from watercress, Nasturtium officinale, and the cress Barbarea verna. Gluconasturtiin is now known to occur widely in other brassica families including Brassicaceae and Resedaceae.

In one investigation of horseradish roots, sinigrin represented 83% and gluconasturtiin 11% of the extracted glucosinolates.

== Synthesis ==
=== Biosynthesis ===
Gluconasturtiin is biosynthesised from the amino acid phenylalanine in a multi-step pathway.

=== Laboratory synthesis ===
The first laboratory synthesis served to confirm the compound's structure. Later work allowed many glucosinolates including this phenethyl derivative to be made. These processes are more efficient than isolating pure materials from the plants in which they are naturally found.

== Function ==
The natural role of glucosinolates are as plant defense compounds. The enzyme myrosinase removes the glucose group in gluconasturiin to give an intermediate which spontaneously rearranges to phenethyl isothiocyanate. This is a reactive material which is toxic to many insect predators and its production is triggered when the plant is damaged. This effect has been called the mustard oil bomb. At concentrations typically found in foods, the glucosinolates are not toxic to humans and can be useful flavor components.

== See also ==
- Glucobrassicin
- Gluconasturtiin Toxicology at Pub Med
