= Ricca's factors =

Ricca's factors as an elicitor in plant defense

A Ricca's factor is considered to be an elicitor of electrical signalling in wounded plants, recently shown to be thioglucoside glucohydrolase, a protein of the myrosinase family.

== History ==
Ricca's factors were originally considered to be hormones transported in the water of the xylem as a stress-induced response in Mimosa pudica, denoted first in scientific literature in 1916 by plant scientist Ubaldo Ricca of Genoa, Italy. These chemicals in theory are released following wounding, or from the herbivores themselves, and travel long distances. Whilst early research initially predicted the inducers to be hormones, as of 2023 these are suspected to be β-thioglucoside glucohydrolase 1 & 2 (TGG1, TGG2).

== Mechanism ==
Severe wounding triggers defence-inducing electrical signals known as slow wave potentials in angiosperms. These widespread signals are transmitted between leaves, often induced by herbivore-mediated damage of the leaf midrib or petiole, via the primary distal leaf vein. It is denoted by a long-duration membrane depolarisation phase, lasting approximately two minutes, allowing rapid loss of membrane potential. Slow wave potentials alongside short-lived aglycone intermediates generated by hydrolysis of glucosinolate or Ricca's factors play a role in plant defence.
