= Indole-3-carbinol =

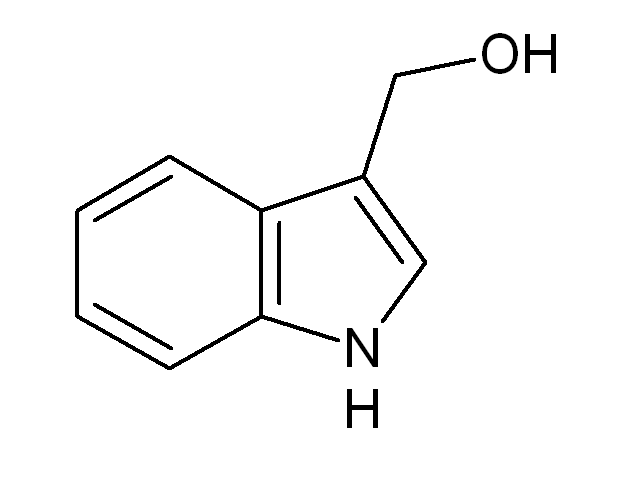

Names
- Preferred IUPAC name (1H-Indol-3-yl)methanol
- Other names Indole-3-carbinol; 3-Indolylcarbinol; 1H-Indole-3-methanol; 3-Hydroxymethylindole; 3-Indolemethanol; Indole-3-methanol; I3C

Identifiers
CAS Number	700-06-1
3D model (JSmol)	Interactive image
ChEBI	CHEBI:24814
ChEMBL	ChEMBL155625
ChemSpider	3581
ECHA InfoCard	100.010.762
EC Number	211-836-2
PubChem CID	3712
RTECS number	NL9483000
UNII	C11E72455F
CompTox Dashboard (EPA)	DTXSID7031458
- InChI: InChI=1S/C9H9NO/c11-6-7-5-10-9-4-2-1-3-8(7)9/h1-5,10-11H,6H2 Key: IVYPNXXAYMYVSP-UHFFFAOYSA-N; InChI=1/C9H9NO/c11-6-7-5-10-9- 4-2-1-3-8(7)9/h1-5,10-11H,6H2; InChI=1/C9H9NO/c11-6-7-5-10-9-4-2-1-3-8(7)9/h1-5,10-11H,6H2 Key: IVYPNXXAYMYVSP-UHFFFAOYAO
- SMILES: OCc2c1ccccc1[nH]c2

Properties
Chemical formula	C_{9}H_{9}NO
Molar mass	147.177 g·mol^{−1}
Appearance	Off-white solid
Melting point	96 to 99 °C (205 to 210 °F; 369 to 372 K)
Solubility in water	Partially in cold water

Hazards
- GHS labelling
Pictograms	(GHS07: Exclamation mark)
Signal word	Warning
Hazard statements	H315, H319
Precautionary statements	P305+P351+P338
NFPA 704 (fire diamond)	1 0 0
- Except where otherwise noted, data are given for materials in their standard state (at 25 °C [77 °F], 100 kPa). verify (what is ?) Infobox references

Indole-3-carbinol (I3C, C_{9}H_{9}NO) is produced by the breakdown of the glucosinolate glucobrassicin, which can be found at relatively high levels in cruciferous vegetables such as broccoli, cabbage, cauliflower, brussels sprouts, collard greens and kale. It is also available in dietary supplements. Indole-3-carbinol is the subject of on-going biomedical research into its possible anticarcinogenic, antioxidant, and anti-atherogenic effects. Research on indole-3-carbinol has been conducted primarily using laboratory animals and cultured cells. Limited and inconclusive human studies have been reported. A recent review of the biomedical research literature found that "evidence of an inverse association between cruciferous vegetable intake and breast or prostate cancer in humans is limited and inconsistent" and "larger randomized controlled trials are needed" to determine if supplemental indole-3-carbinol has health benefits.

== Indole-3-carbinol and cancer ==
Investigation of mechanisms by which consumption of indole-3-carbinol might influence cancer incidence focuses on its ability to alter estrogen metabolism and other cellular effects. Controlled studies have been performed on such animals as rats, mice, and rainbow trout, introducing various controlled levels of carcinogens, and levels of indole-3-carbinol into their daily diet. Results showed dose-related decreases in tumor susceptibility due to indole-3-carbinol (inferred by decreases in aflatoxin–DNA binding). The first direct evidence of pure anti-initiating activity by a natural anticarcinogen (indole-3-carbinol) found in human diet was claimed by Dashwood et al. in 1989.

Indole-3-carbinol induces a G1 growth arrest of human reproductive cancer cells. This is potentially relevant to the prevention and treatment of cancer, as the G1 phase of cell growth occurs early in the cell life cycle, and, for most cells, is the major period of cell cycle during its lifespan. The G1 phase is marked by synthesis of various enzymes that are required in the next ("S") phase, including those needed for DNA replication.

Overuse of indole-3-carbinol supplements in the hope of preventing cancer may be unwise, as the hormone balance should be tested (via simple blood test) before regular consumption. Such caution is advised, due to its effect on estrogen levels (estrogen has a significant impact on brain function).

It promotes liver cancer in trout when it is combined with aflatoxin B1 and demotes metastasis.

== Melanoma ==
Indole-3-carbinol causes proliferation arrest and apoptosis in human melanoma cells. Kim et al. (2011) showed that the master regulator of melanoma biology, microphthalmia-associated transcription factor (MITF-M) was downregulated by indole-3-carbinol to induce apoptosis. Kundu et al. (2017) demonstrated that the anticancer property of indole-3-carbinol is driven by specific targeting of oncogenic pathways. In two different studies using xenografted mouse model of melanoma, they observed that subcutaneous injection of indole-3-carbinol could bring down tumor burden significantly. The underlying molecular mechanism of this anti-tumor effect was found to be by the specific inhibition of activity of oncogenic BRAFV600E in tumors that harbored the mutation. However, in tumors that expressed wild type BRAF, indole-3-carbinol did not cause any comparable antiproliferative effect. Additionally indole-3-carbinol did not cause antiproliferation even in normal epidermal melanocytes underscoring the specificity and selectivity of its action. Kundu et al. further showed that inhibition of BRAF V600E activity by indole-3-carbinol resulted in downregulation of MITF-M by downstream signaling which caused a G1 cell cycle arrest leading to the observed antiproliferative effect.

In a second study Kundu et al. showed that in melanoma cells where PTEN is downregulated, indole-3-carbinol directly interacts with NEDD4_{1} to prevent PTEN ubiquitination and subsequent proteasomal degradation. This results in stabilization of PTEN and inhibition of proliferation by downstream AKT signaling. Overall scientific evidence shows that in melanoma, indole-3-carbinol specifically inhibits the two most commonly associated driver mutation signaling pathways to cause proliferation, a fact that can be used to design clinical trial to treat human patients with indole-3-carbinol in future.

== Systemic lupus erythematosus ==
Indole-3-carbinol can shift estrogen metabolism towards less estrogenic metabolites. Systemic lupus erythematosus (SLE, or lupus), an autoimmune disease, is associated with estrogen. In a study using mice bred to develop lupus, indole-3-carbinol was fed to one group while another group was fed a standard mouse diet; the group fed the indole-3-carbinol diet lived longer and had fewer signs of disease.

Another study of lupus-prone mice with indole-3-carbinol defined the mechanism for the improvement of their disease to be due to sequential blocks in the development of B and T cells of these mice. The maturation arrests resulted in a fall in autoantibody production, thought to be a crucial component of lupus causation. In addition, I3C supplementation of the disease prone mice led to a normalization of their T cell function.

Women with lupus can manifest a metabolic response to indole-3-carbinol and might also benefit from its antiestrogenic effects. Clinical trials are currently underway to determine the efficacy of treating human patients with lupus using indole-3-carbinol.

== Effect in recurrent respiratory papillomatosis ==
There is evidence suggesting that indole-3-carbinol may have an effect on human papillomavirus-infected cells in both pediatrics and adult patients. Research is ongoing.
