= Allyl cyanide =

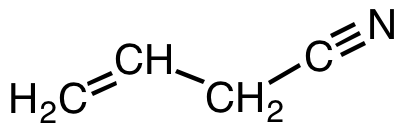

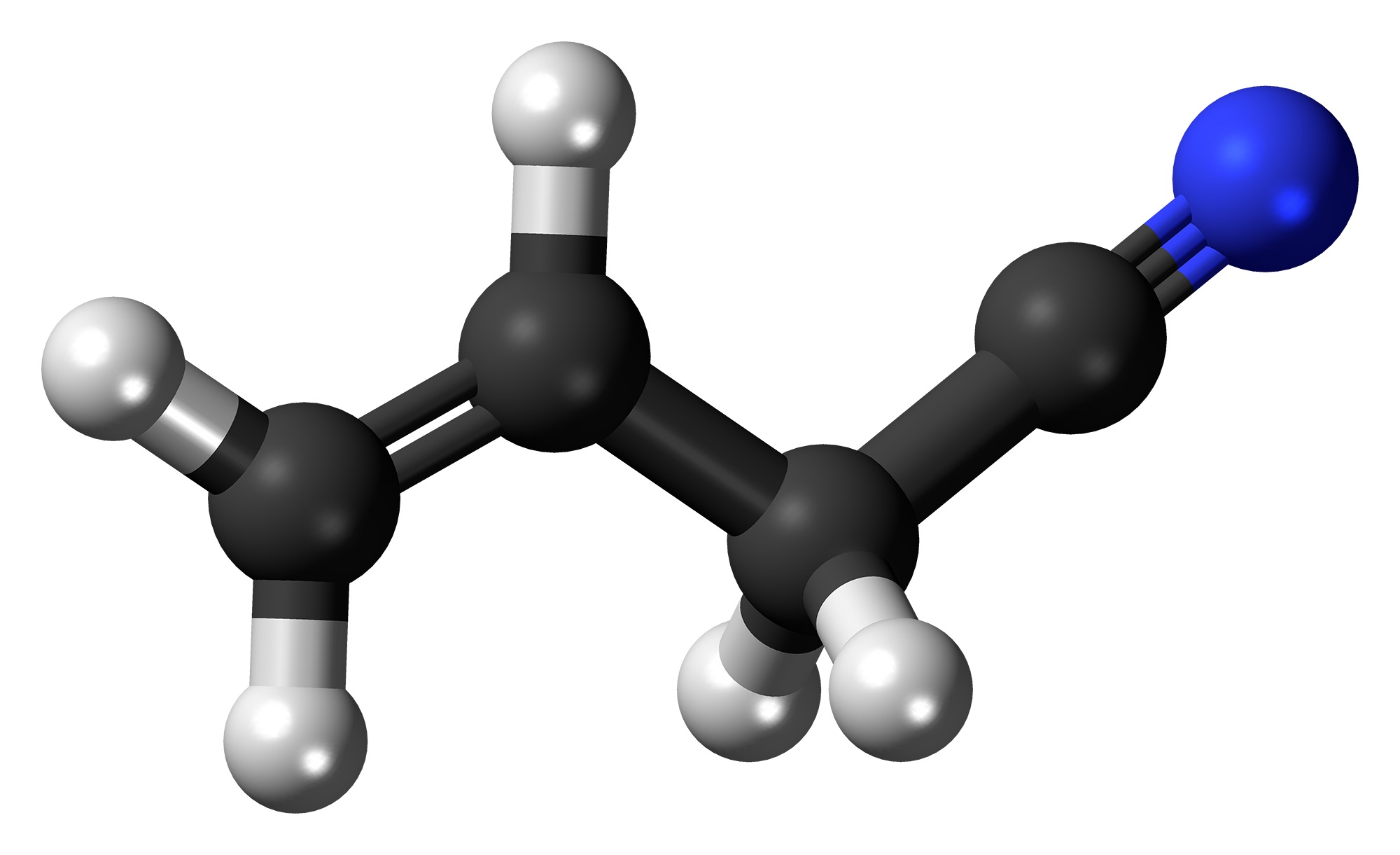

Names
- Preferred IUPAC name But-3-enenitrile

Identifiers
CAS Number	109-75-1
3D model (JSmol)	Interactive image
Beilstein Reference	605352
ChEBI	CHEBI:183063
ChemSpider	13876176
ECHA InfoCard	100.003.366
EC Number	203-701-1
PubChem CID	8009
UNII	527U1WJJ18
CompTox Dashboard (EPA)	DTXSID6021905
- InChI: Key: SJNALLRHIVGIBI-UHFFFAOYSA-N
- SMILES: C=CCC#N

Properties
Chemical formula	C_{4}H_{5}N
Molar mass	67.091 g·mol^{−1}
Appearance	colourless liquid
Density	0.834 g/cm^{3}
Melting point	−87 °C (−125 °F; 186 K)
Boiling point	116 to 121 °C (241 to 250 °F; 389 to 394 K)

Hazards
- Occupational safety and health (OHS/OSH)
Main hazards	Flammable, poison, irritates skin and eyes
Ingestion hazards	Toxic if swallowed.
Inhalation hazards	May be fatal if inhaled. Causes respiratory tract irritation.
Eye hazards	Causes eye irritation.
Skin hazards	Causes skin irritation.
- GHS labelling
Pictograms	(GHS02: Flammable) (GHS06: Toxic)
Signal word	Danger
Hazard statements	H226, H301, H311, H312, H315, H319
Precautionary statements	P261, P280, P301+P310, P305+P351+P338, P311
NFPA 704 (fire diamond)	4 3 0
Flash point	24 °C (75 °F; 297 K)
Autoignition temperature	455 °C (851 °F; 728 K)
Safety data sheet (SDS)	MSDS
- Except where otherwise noted, data are given for materials in their standard state (at 25 °C [77 °F], 100 kPa). Infobox references

Allyl cyanide is an organic compound with the formula CH_{2}CHCH_{2}CN. Like other small alkyl nitriles, allyl cyanide is colorless and soluble in organic solvents. Allyl cyanide occurs naturally as an antifeedant and is used as a cross-linking agent in some polymers.

== Synthesis ==
Allyl cyanide is obtained by the reaction of allyl acetate with hydrogen cyanide.

A laboratory route to allyl cyanide involves treating allyl bromide with copper(I) cyanide.

CH_{2}=CHCH_{2}Br + CuCN → CH_{2}=CHCH_{2}CN + CuBr

Other allyl halides may be used for this reaction including allyl iodide as done by A. Rinne and B. Tollens in 1871 where iodide is a better leaving group than its bromide equivalent and therefore increases the yield.

== Natural occurrences ==
Allyl cyanide was discovered in 1863 by H. Will and W. Koerner in 1863, they found the compound to be present in mustard oil. The first synthesis of allyl cyanide was reported by A. Claus in 1864.

Allyl cyanide is produced in cruciferous vegetables by myrosinase, an enzyme which hydrolyses glucosinolates to form nitriles and other products. Myrosinase is activated by l-ascorbic acid (vitamin C) under the influence of the pH, and higher myrosinase activity has been shown in damaged cabbage leaves, while its activity is reduced by cooking the leaves, although the glucosinolates can then be transformed to allyl cyanide by microflora in the intestines. As cruciferous vegetables like cabbage, broccoli, cauliflower and sprouts are part of the human diet, allyl cyanide is normally consumed orally. The normal dose of allyl cyanide contained in a meal is shown to be much lower than the doses used in animal studies. The daily level at which behavioural effects were demonstrated is 500 μg/kg bodyweight, whereas the daily human consumption amounts to 0.12 μg/kg. Although the dose-response relationship is still to be examined, it is therefore thought that allyl cyanide has no potency as a neurotoxicant when consumed in vegetables.

== Applications ==
Allyl cyanide may be used as an additive in propylene carbonate-based electrolytes for graphite anodes preventing exfoliation of the anode by film-forming. The underlying mechanism is thought to be a reductive polymerization mechanism.

== Neurotoxicity ==
Studies performed on rats showed that allyl cyanide cause loss of hair cells in the auditory system and troubling of the cornea. The same study also showed that the rearing activity of rats was reduced by oral ingestion of allyl cyanide. It has these neurotoxic symptoms in common with other aliphatic mononitriles such as 2-butenenitrile and 3,3'-iminopropionitrile. Allyl cyanide was also shown to cause a swelling of the axons. Studies done with mice showed that a single (albeit rather high) dose of allyl cyanide can cause permanent behavioural changes. These changes include twitching of the head, an increased locomotor activity and circling. These mice were furthermore shown to suffer from neuronal contractions, possibly leading to cell death.

Sheep are far more tolerant to the toxic effects of allyl cyanide than rats. Studies suggest that this detoxification is due to the predigestion in the rumen.

== Toxicokinetics ==
Allyl cyanide is known to be metabolized in the liver by the Cytochrome P-450 enzyme system (mainly CYP2E1) to cyanide. The absorption and distribution of allyl cyanide in rats is extraordinary fast. The highest concentrations of allyl cyanide were measured in the stomach tissue and stomach contents due to the fact that the stomach is the principal site of absorption after oral administration. The next highest concentration levels were found to be in the bone marrow with a peak in concentration between 0 and 3 hours after administration. The liver, kidneys, spleen, and lungs also accumulated allyl cyanide over the course of 48 hours. The highest concentration in the kidney was observed between 3 and 6 hr after dosing. This observation indicates rapid elimination of allyl cyanide. The major route of detoxification is the conversion from cyanide to thiocyanate. Major routes of excretion are through the urine and expired air.

The serotonin and dopamine systems are thought to be involved in the behavioral abnormalities caused by allyl cyanide. Treatment by serotonin and dopamine antagonists caused a reduction in the behavioral abnormalities. Ataxia, trembling, convulsions, diarrhea, salivation, lacrimation, and irregular breathing are known effects that are caused by oral ingestion of allyl cyanide.

== See also ==
- Nitrile
- Allyl group
- Glucosinolate
- Myrosinase
- Cyanide
