= C5H7NOS =

The molecular formula C_{5}H_{7}NOS (molar mass: 129.18 g/mol, exact mass: 129.0248 u) may refer to:

- Goitrin
- Penam
