= Methionine transaminase =

Identifiers
- EC no.: 2.6.1.88

Databases
- IntEnz: IntEnz view
- BRENDA: BRENDA entry
- ExPASy: NiceZyme view
- KEGG: KEGG entry
- MetaCyc: metabolic pathway
- PRIAM: profile
- PDB structures: RCSB PDB PDBe PDBsum
Search
- PMC: articles
- PubMed: articles
- NCBI: proteins

Methionine transaminase (EC 2.6.1.88, methionine-oxo-acid transaminase) is an enzyme with systematic name L-methionine:2-oxo-acid aminotransferase. It catalyses a general chemical reaction that is used in the pathway to recycle the amino acid L-methionine:

L-methionine + an α-keto acid $\rightleftharpoons$ 4-(methylthio)-2-oxobutanoic acid + an L-amino acid

The enzyme characterised from Klebsiella pneumoniae operates in the direction towards methionine and can use a variety of L-amino acids as amino group donors to react with 4-(methylthio)-2-oxobutanoic acid. L-tyrosine was found to be most effective. A crystal structure of the corresponding enzyme in Escherichia coli has been determined.

L-methionine
+
4-hydroxyphenylpyruvic acid
4-(methylthio)-2-oxobutanoic acid
+
tyrosine

In plants such as Arabidopsis thaliana, the enzyme operates in the forward direction, as part of the pathway to glucosinolates which contain extra methylene groups (CH_{2}) between the amino acid part and the thioether of methionine. These intermediates are formed from 4-(methylthio)-2-oxobutanoic acid.
