= Goitrin =

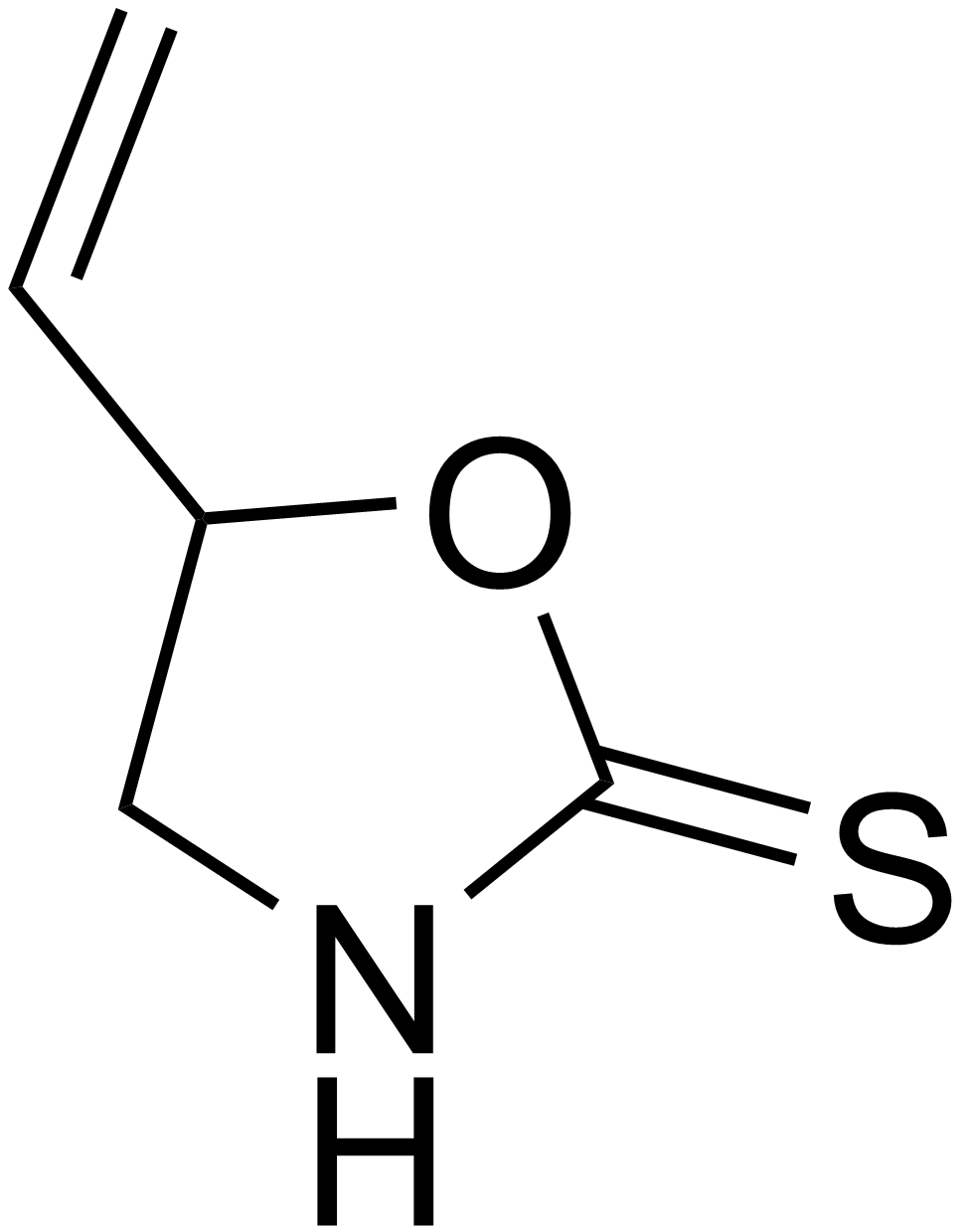

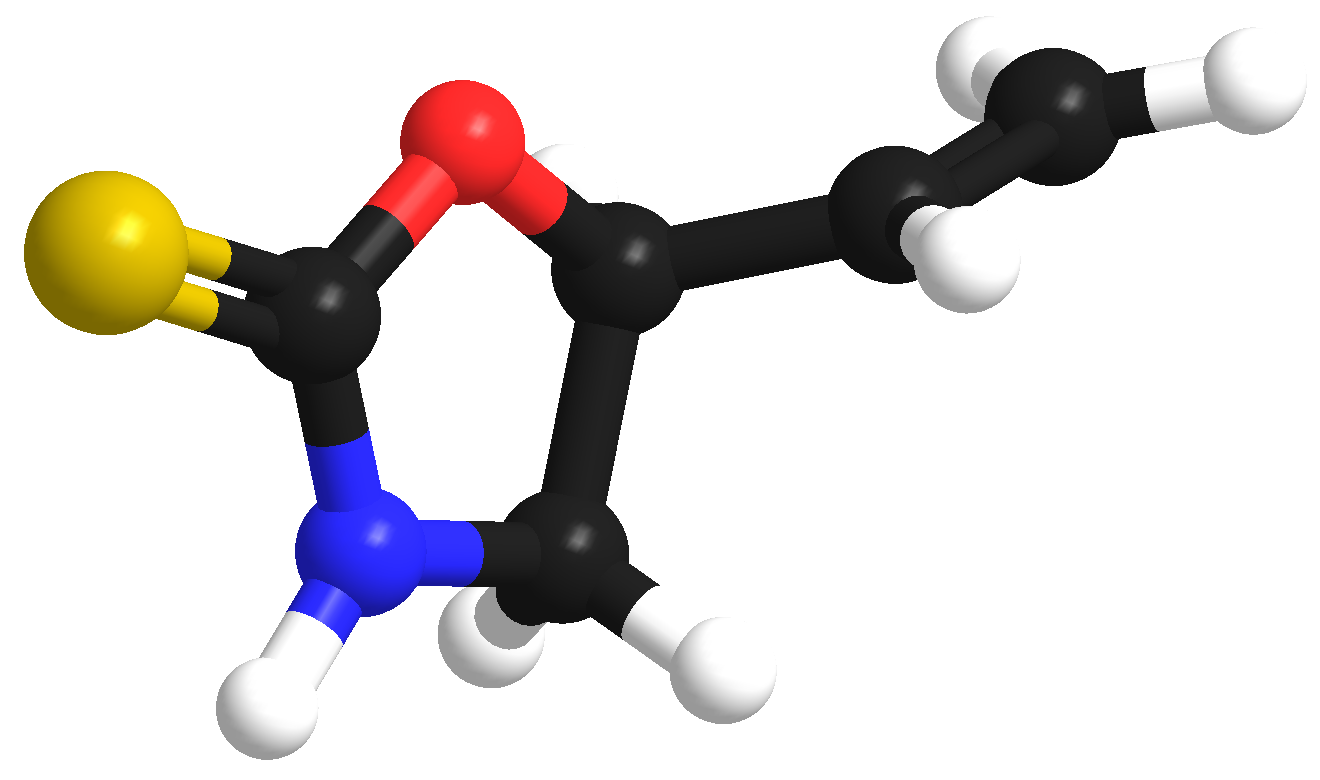

Names
- IUPAC name 5-Vinyl-1,3-oxazolidine-2-thione
- Preferred IUPAC name 5-Ethenyl-1,3-oxazolidine-2-thione
- Other names Goitrin

Identifiers
CAS Number	13190-34-6
3D model (JSmol)	Interactive image
ChEBI	CHEBI:183226
ChemSpider	2299106
ECHA InfoCard	100.032.845
PubChem CID	3034683
UNII	O8KVD7J2P5
CompTox Dashboard (EPA)	DTXSID10274235
- InChI: InChI=1S/C5H7NOS/c1-2-4-3-6-5(8)7-4/h2,4H,1,3H2,(H,6,8) Key: UZQVYLOFLQICCT-UHFFFAOYSA-N; InChI=1/C5H7NOS/c1-2-4-3-6-5(8)7-4/h2,4H,1,3H2,(H,6,8) Key: UZQVYLOFLQICCT-UHFFFAOYAN
- SMILES: S=C1OC(\C=C)CN1

Properties
Chemical formula	C_{5}H_{7}NOS
Molar mass	129.18 g/mol
- Except where otherwise noted, data are given for materials in their standard state (at 25 °C [77 °F], 100 kPa). verify (what is ?) Infobox references

Goitrin is an organosulfur compound classified as a derivative of oxazolidine and as a cyclic thiocarbamate. It reduces the production of thyroid hormones such as thyroxine. It is found in cruciferous vegetables such as cabbage, brussels sprouts and rapeseed oil, and is formed by the hydrolysis of a glucosinolate: progoitrin or 2-hydroxy-3-butenyl glucosinolate. The unstable isothiocyanate (2-hydroxy-3-butenyl isothiocyanate) derived from the latter glucosinolate spontaneously cyclizes to goitrin, because the hydroxy group is situated in proximity to the isothiocyanate group (allowing a five-membered ring to be formed). Hence, the oxygen in the molecule stems from the hydroxy group of the original unstable isothiocyanate. Plants containing this specific glucosinolate (or glucosinolates such as glucobrassicin and sinalbin which liberate thiocyanate ion) have goitrogenic potential due to the goitrin and thiocyanate they contain. However, they do not seem to alter thyroid function in humans at realistic amounts in the diet.

== See also ==
- Goitrogen
