= Benzyl isothiocyanate =

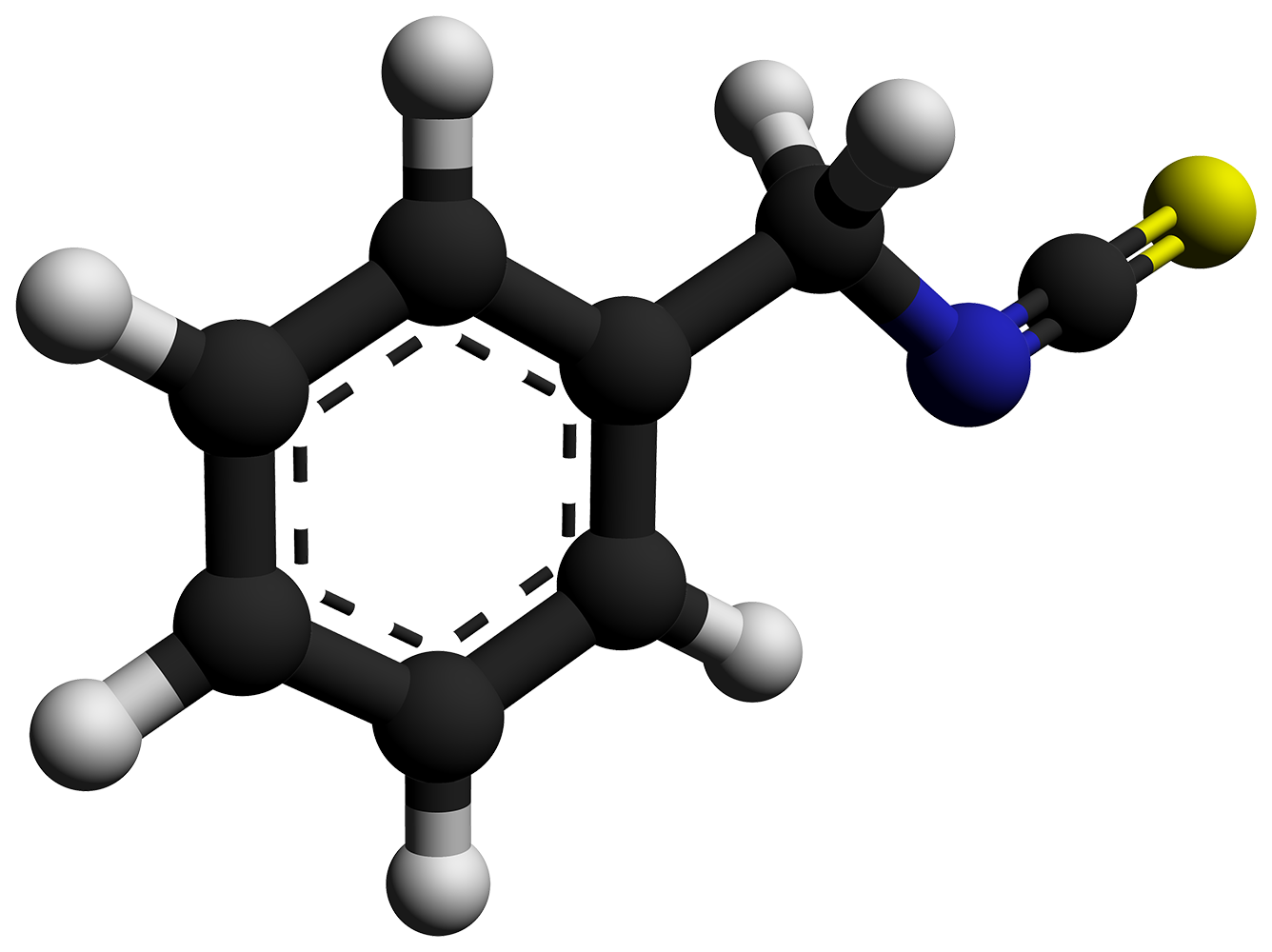

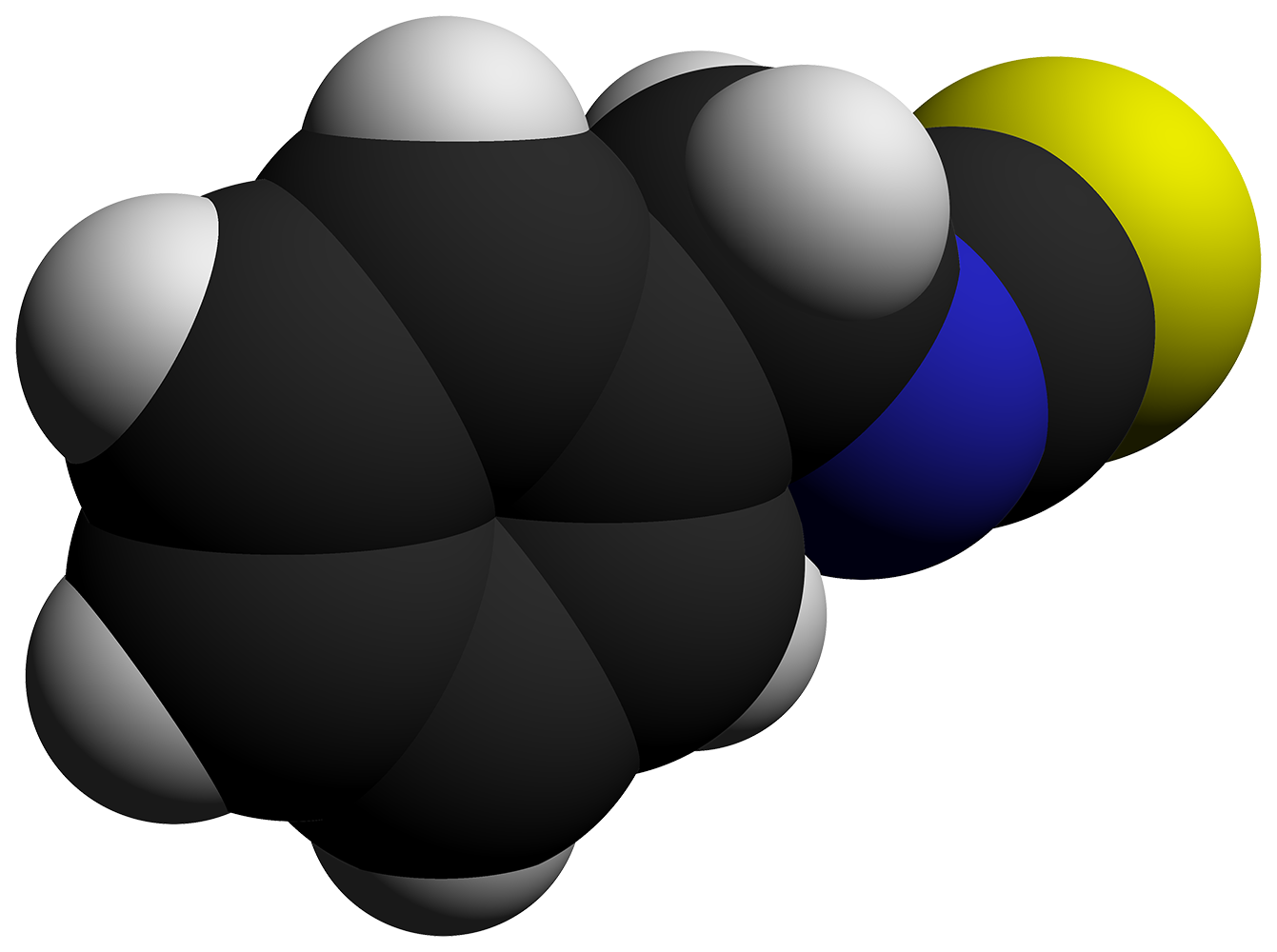

Names
- Preferred IUPAC name (Isothiocyanatomethyl)benzene

Identifiers
CAS Number	622-78-6
3D model (JSmol)	Interactive image
ChemSpider	2256
ECHA InfoCard	100.009.777
PubChem CID	2346
UNII	871J6YOR8Q
CompTox Dashboard (EPA)	DTXSID0020155
- InChI: InChI=1S/C8H7NS/c10-7-9-6-8-4-2-1-3-5-8/h1-5H,6H2 Key: MDKCFLQDBWCQCV-UHFFFAOYSA-N
- SMILES: c1ccc(cc1)CN=C=S

Properties
Chemical formula	C_{8}H_{7}NS
Molar mass	149.21 g·mol^{−1}
Density	1.125 g/mL
Boiling point	242-243
- Except where otherwise noted, data are given for materials in their standard state (at 25 °C [77 °F], 100 kPa). Infobox references

Benzyl isothiocyanate (BITC) is an isothiocyanate found in plants of the mustard family.

== Occurrence ==
It can be found in Alliaria petiolata, pilu oil, and papaya seeds where it is the main product of the glucotropaeolin breakdown by the enzyme myrosinase.

== Activity ==
Benzyl isothiocyanate, and other isothiocyanates in general, were found to be protective against pancreatic carcinogenesis in vitro via expression of the p21/WAF1 gene. One published study showed its restraining impact on obesity, fatty-liver, and insulin resistance in diet-induced obesity mouse models.
