= Sinigrin =

Names
- IUPAC name (Z)-N-[1-(β-D-glucopyranosylsulfanyl)but-3-en-1-ylidene]hydroxylamine-O-sulfonic acid
- Systematic IUPAC name (Z)-N-(1-{{#parsoidfragment:0}}{[(2S,3R,4S,5S,6R)-3,4,5-trihydroxy-6-(hydroxymethyl)oxan-2-yl]sulfanyl}but-3-en-1-ylidene)hydroxylamine-O-sulfonic acid
- Other names Allyl glucosinolate; 2-Propenyl glucosinolate; (1Z)-N-(Sulfooxy)but-3-enimidoyl 1-thio-β-D-glucopyranoside

Identifiers
CAS Number	Sinigrin: 534-69-0; K^{+} salt: 3952-98-5
3D model (JSmol)	Sinigrin: Interactive image; K^{+} salt: Interactive image
ChEBI	Sinigrin: CHEBI:79317
ChemSpider	Sinigrin: 4588961; K^{+} salt: 4576678
PubChem CID	Sinigrin: 5486549; K^{+} salt: 23684362
UNII	K^{+} salt: 50UM64RMBJ
- InChI: InChI=1S/C10H17NO9S2/c1-2-3-6(11-20-22(16,17)18)21-10-9(15)8(14)7(13)5(4-12)19-10/h2,5,7-10,12-15H,1,3-4H2,(H,16,17,18)/b11-6-/t5-,7-,8+,9-,10+/m1/s1 Key: PHZOWSSBXJXFOR-GLVDENFASA-N; K^{+} salt: InChI=1S/C10H17NO9S2.K/c1-2-3-6(11-20-22(16,17)18)21-10-9(15)8(14)7(13)5(4-12)19-10;/h2,5,7-10,12-15H,1,3-4H2,(H,16,17,18);/q;+1/p-1/b11-6-;/t5-,7-,8+,9-,10+;/m1./s1 Key: QKFAFSGJTMHRRY-FVDOMRANSA-M
- SMILES: Sinigrin: C=CC/C(=N/OS(=O)(=O)O)/S[C@H]1[C@@H]([C@H]([C@@H]([C@H](O1)CO)O)O)O; K^{+} salt: C=CC/C(=N/OS(=O)(=O)[O-])/S[C@H]1[C@@H]([C@H]([C@@H]([C@H](O1)CO)O)O)O.[K+]

Properties
Chemical formula	C_{10}H_{17}NO_{9}S_{2}
Molar mass	359.36 g·mol^{−1}
- Except where otherwise noted, data are given for materials in their standard state (at 25 °C [77 °F], 100 kPa). Infobox references

Sinigrin or allyl glucosinolate is a glucosinolate that belongs to the family of glucosides found in some plants of the family Brassicaceae such as Brussels sprouts, broccoli, and the seeds of black mustard (Brassica nigra). Whenever sinigrin-containing plant tissue is crushed or otherwise damaged, the enzyme myrosinase degrades sinigrin to a mustard oil (allyl isothiocyanate), which is responsible for the pungent taste of mustard and horseradish. Seeds of white mustard, Sinapis alba, give a less pungent mustard because this species contains a different glucosinolate, sinalbin.

== Occurrence ==
The compound was first reported in 1839, after its isolation from black mustard Brassica nigra, also known as Sinapis nigra, after which it was named. Sinigrin is now known to occur widely in other brassica families including Brassicaceae and Capparaceae.

== Structure ==
E isomer (shown as anion)

The chemical structure of sinigrin had been established by 1930. This showed that it is a glucose derivative with β-D-glucopyranose configuration. It was unclear whether the C=N bond was in the Z (or syn) form, with sulfur and oxygen substituents on the same side of the double bond, or the alternative E form in which they are on opposite sides. The matter was settled by X-ray crystallography of its potassium salt in 1963. It is now known that all natural glucosinolates are of Z form.

== Synthesis ==
=== Biosynthesis ===
Sinigrin is biosynthesised from the amino acid methionine in a multi-step pathway.

=== Laboratory synthesis ===
The first laboratory syntheses of sinigrin was published in 1965. Later work provided a more efficient route.

== Function ==
The natural role of glucosinolates are as plant defense compounds. The enzyme myrosinase removes the glucose group in sinigrin to give an intermediate which spontaneously rearranges to allyl isothiocyanate, the compound responsible for the pungent taste of Dijon mustard. This is a reactive material which is toxic to many insect predators and its production is triggered when the plant is damaged. This effect has been called the mustard oil bomb. Singrin is also known to be allelopathic. At concentrations typically found in foods, the glucosinolates are not toxic to humans and can be useful flavor components.

Sinigrin is unusual among the glucosinolates because it is also known to be the natural precursor for other volatile compounds including epithionitrile, allyl cyanide and allyl thiocyanate.

== See also ==
- List of phytochemicals in food
