= Progoitrin =

Identifiers
CAS Number	585-95-5
3D model (JSmol)	Interactive image
ChEBI	CHEBI:79352
ChemSpider	58145377
KEGG	C08425
PubChem CID	5281139
UNII	S27T66W417
CompTox Dashboard (EPA)	DTXSID20974057
- InChI: InChI=1S/C11H19NO10S2/c1-2-5(14)3-7(12-22-24(18,19)20)23-11-10(17)9(16)8(15)6(4-13)21-11/h2,5-6,8-11,13-17H,1,3-4H2,(H,18,19,20)/t5-,6+,8+,9-,10+,11-/m0/s1 Key: MYHSVHWQEVDFQT-ILPXZUKPSA-N
- SMILES: OC[C@H]1O[C@@H](SC(C[C@@H](O)C=C)=NOS(O)(=O)=O)[C@H](O)[C@@H](O)[C@@H]1O

Properties
Chemical formula	C_{11}H_{19}NO_{10}S_{2}
- Except where otherwise noted, data are given for materials in their standard state (at 25 °C [77 °F], 100 kPa). Infobox references

Progoitrin is a biochemical from the glucosinolate family that is found in some food, which is inactive but after ingestion is converted to goitrin. Goitrin decreases the thyroid hormone production.

Progoitrin has been isolated in cabbage, brussels sprouts, kale, peanuts, mustard, rutabaga, kohlrabi, spinach, cauliflower, horseradish, and rapeseed oil.

== Bibliography ==
- Greer, Monte A. (20 March 1956). "Isolation from Rutabaga Seed of Progoitrin, the Precursor of the Naturally Occurring Antithyroid Compound, Goitrin (L-5-Vinyl-2-Thioöxazolidine)^{1}". Journal of the American Chemical Society. 78 (6): 1260–1261. doi:10.1021/ja01587a052.
