= Phenethyl isothiocyanate =

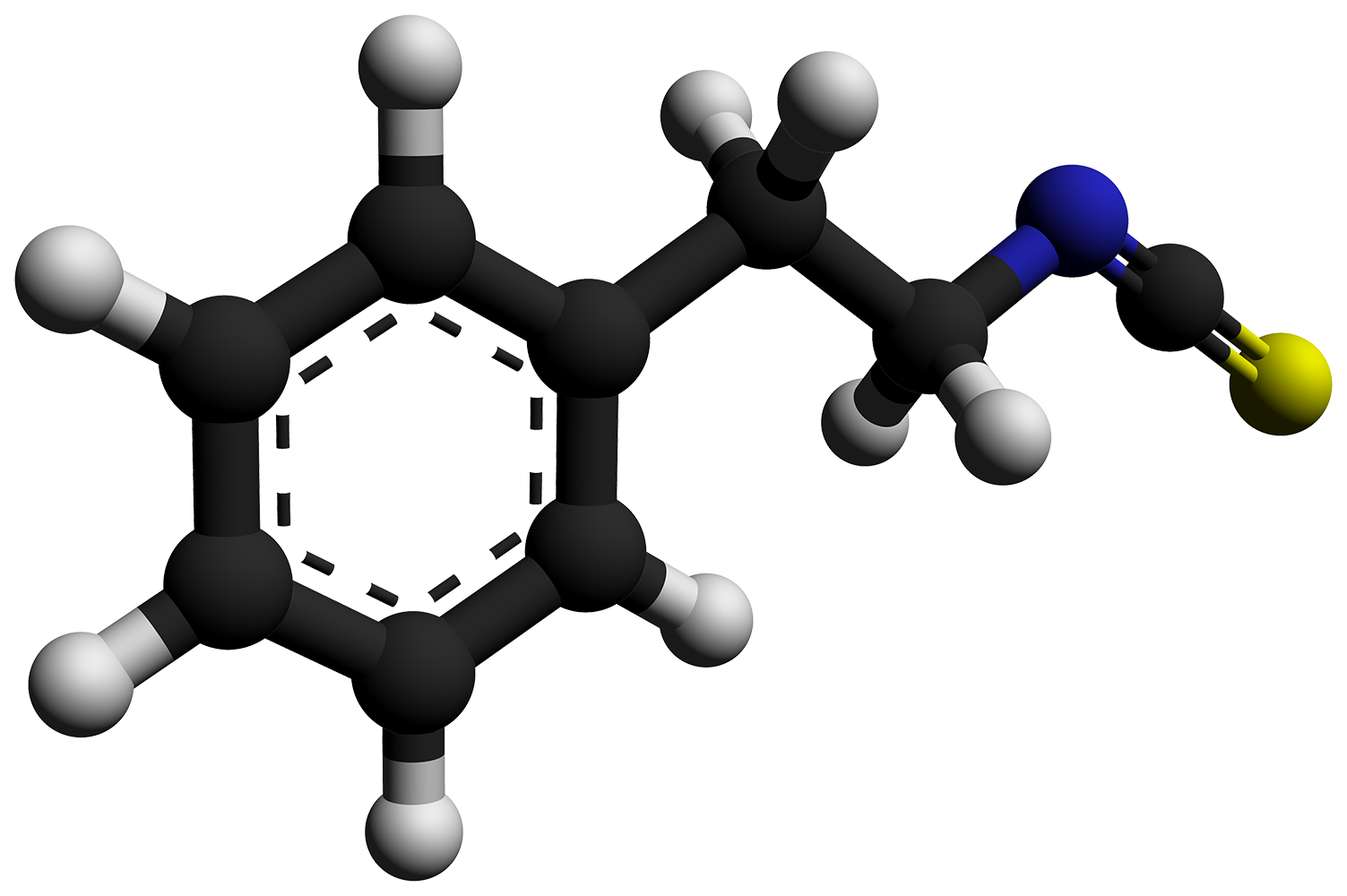

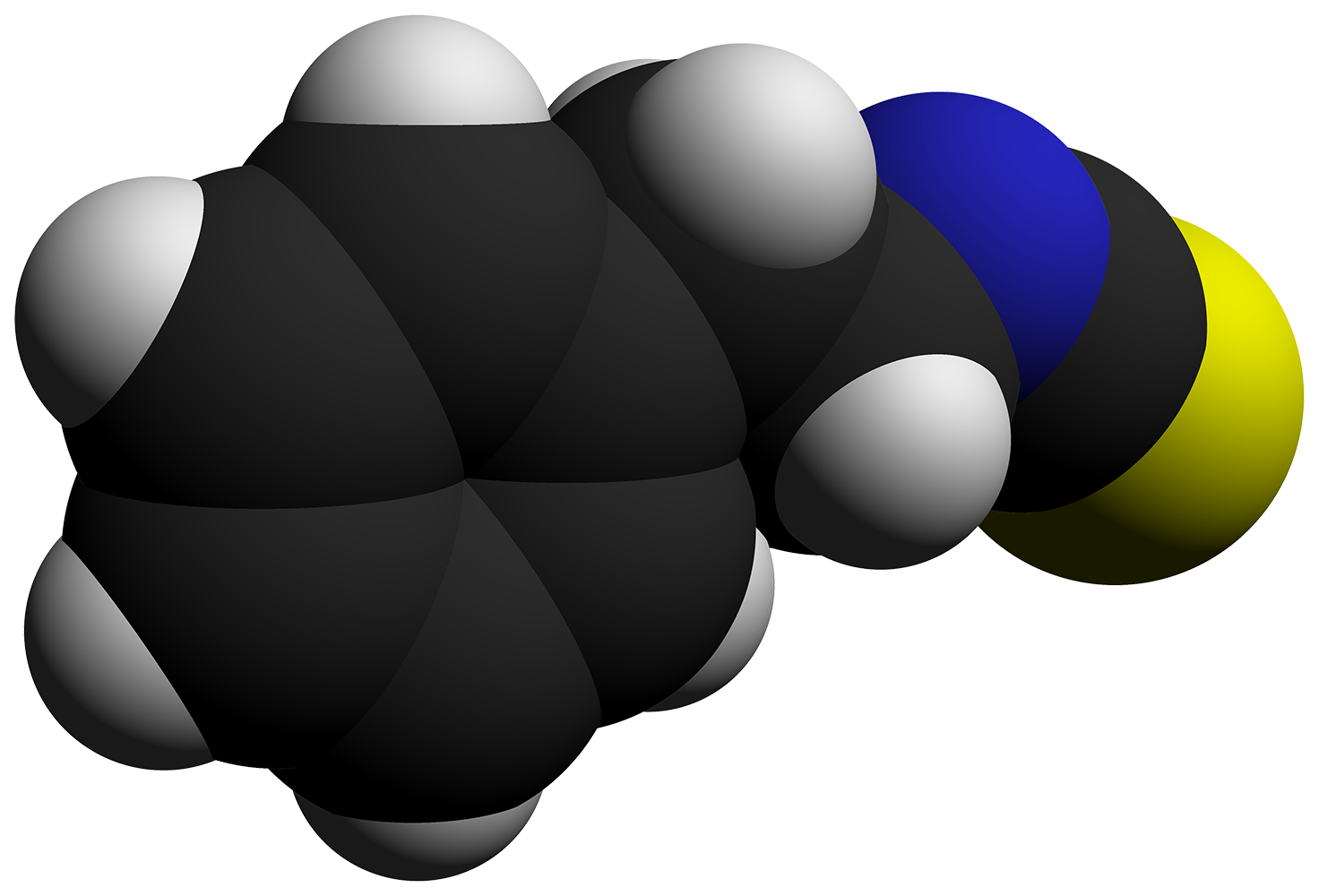

Names
- Preferred IUPAC name (2-Isothiocyanatoethyl)benzene
- Other names Phenylethyl isothiocyanate; Phenethyl mustard oil

Identifiers
CAS Number	2257-09-2
3D model (JSmol)	Interactive image
Abbreviations	PEITC
ChEBI	CHEBI:351346
ChEMBL	ChEMBL151649
ChemSpider	15870
ECHA InfoCard	100.017.142
PubChem CID	16741
UNII	6U7TFK75KV
CompTox Dashboard (EPA)	DTXSID5021120
- InChI: InChI=1S/C9H9NS/c11-8-10-7-6-9-4-2-1-3-5-9/h1-5H,6-7H2 Key: IZJDOKYDEWTZSO-UHFFFAOYSA-N; InChI=1/C9H9NS/c11-8-10-7-6-9-4-2-1-3-5-9/h1-5H,6-7H2 Key: IZJDOKYDEWTZSO-UHFFFAOYAB
- SMILES: S=C=N/CCc1ccccc1

Properties
Chemical formula	C_{9}H_{9}NS
Molar mass	163.24 g·mol^{−1}
- Except where otherwise noted, data are given for materials in their standard state (at 25 °C [77 °F], 100 kPa). verify (what is ?) Infobox references

Phenethyl isothiocyanate (PEITC) is a naturally occurring isothiocyanate whose precursor, gluconasturtiin is found in Nasturtium officinale.

PEITC has been studied for its potential for chemoprevention of cancers, such as prostate cancer.

In terms of biosynthesis, PEITC is produced from gluconasturtiin by the action of the enzyme myrosinase.
