= Goitrogen =

Substances that disrupt the production of thyroid hormones

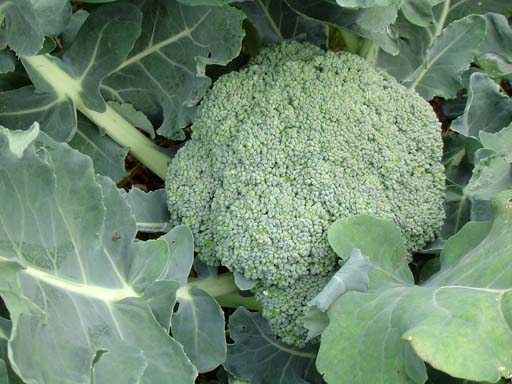
Broccoli is a goitrogenic food

Goitrogens are substances that disrupt the production of thyroid hormones. This triggers the pituitary to release thyroid-stimulating hormone (TSH), which then promotes the growth of thyroid tissue, eventually leading to goiter.

== Goitrogenic drugs and chemicals ==
Chemicals that have been shown to have goitrogenic effects include:

- Sulfadimethoxine (Albon), propylthiouracil, potassium perchlorate, and iopanoic acid.
- Some oxazolidines such as goitrin.
- Ions such as thiocyanate (from cigarette smoking for example) and perchlorate decrease iodide uptake by competitive inhibition and, as a consequence of reduced thyroxine and triiodothyronine secretion by the gland, cause, at low doses, an increased release of thyrotropin (by reduced negative feedback), which then stimulates the gland.
- Amiodarone inhibits peripheral conversion of thyroxine to triiodothyronine; also interferes with thyroid hormone action.
- Lithium inhibits thyroid hormone release.
- Phenobarbitone, phenytoin, carbamazepine, rifampin induce metabolic degradation of triiodothyronine (T_{3}) and thyroxine (T_{4}).

== Goitrogenic foods ==
Foods which have been demonstrated to have goitrogenic effects include soy, cassava (when crushed and not detoxified by soaking,) vegetables in the genus Brassica (such as broccoli and cabbage), and other cruciferous vegetables. The goitrogenic nature of brassica vegetables appears doubtful, particularly when accompanied by adequate dietary iodine.

In places where iodine deficiency exists in tandem with millet being a major component of the diet, millet consumption can contribute to thyroid enlargement which is the start of endemic goiter.

== See also ==
- Hypothyroidism
- Hyperthyroidism
- Thyroid
