= Glucotropaeolin =

Names
- IUPAC name 1-S-[(1Z)-2-Phenyl-N-(sulfooxy)ethanimidoyl]-1-thio-beta-D-glucopyranose
- Other names Benzyl glucosinolate

Identifiers
CAS Number	499-26-3
3D model (JSmol)	Interactive image
Beilstein Reference	61369
ChEBI	CHEBI:17127
ChemSpider	5020503
KEGG	C02153
PubChem CID	6537197
CompTox Dashboard (EPA)	DTXSID10964467
- InChI: InChI=1S/C14H19NO9S2/c16-7-9-11(17)12(18)13(19)14(23-9)25-10(15-24-26(20,21)22)6-8-4-2-1-3-5-8/h1-5,9,11-14,16-19H,6-7H2,(H,20,21,22)/b15-10-/t9-,11-,12+,13-,14+/m1/s1 Key: QQGLQYQXUKHWPX-RFEZBLSLSA-N
- SMILES: c1ccc(cc1)C/C(=N/OS(=O)(=O)O)/S[C@H]2[C@@H]([C@H]([C@@H]([C@H](O2)CO)O)O)O

Properties
Chemical formula	C_{14}H_{19}NO_{9}S_{2}
Molar mass	409.42 g·mol^{−1}
- Except where otherwise noted, data are given for materials in their standard state (at 25 °C [77 °F], 100 kPa). Infobox references

Glucotropaeolin or benzyl glucosinolate is a glucosinolate found in cruciferous vegetables, particularly garden cress. Upon enzymatic activity, it is transformed into benzyl isothiocyanate, which contributes to the characteristic flavor of these brassicas.

== Occurrence ==
The compound was first reported in 1899, after its isolation from Tropaeolum majus, a nasturtium species. Glucotropaeolin is now known to occur widely in other brassica families including Caricaceae, Phytolaccaceae, Resedaceae, Salvadoraceae and Tovariaceae.

== Structure ==
E isomer

The chemical structure of glucotropaeolin was confirmed by total synthesis in 1957. This showed that it is a glucose derivative with β-D-glucopyranose configuration. At that time it was unclear whether the C=N bond was in the Z form, with sulfur and oxygen substituents on the same side of the double bond, or the alternative E form in which they are on opposite sides. The suggestion was made that the Z form was more likely, based on the known decomposition to benzyl isothiocyanate by a mechanism analogous to the Lossen rearrangement. However, when an identical product was obtained by an alternative route in 1963, it was pointed out that the E form would be expected to rearrange in a similar way. The matter was settled by X-ray crystallography and other spectroscopic studies and it is now known that all natural glucosinolates are of Z form.

== Synthesis ==
=== Biosynthesis ===
Glucotropaeolin is biosynthesised from the amino acid phenylalanine in a multi-step pathway.

=== Laboratory synthesis ===
The first laboratory syntheses served to confirm the compound's structure. Later work allowed many glucosinolates including this benzyl derivative to be made. These processes are more efficient than isolating pure materials from the plants in which they are naturally found.

== Function ==
The natural role of glucosinolates are as plant defense compounds. The enzyme myrosinase removes the glucose group in glucotropaeolin to give an intermediate which spontaneously rearranges to benzyl isothiocyanate. This is a reactive material which is toxic to many insect predators and its production is triggered when the plant is damaged. This effect has been called the mustard oil bomb. At concentrations typically found in foods, the glucosinolates are not toxic to humans and can be useful flavor components.
