= Allyl isothiocyanate =

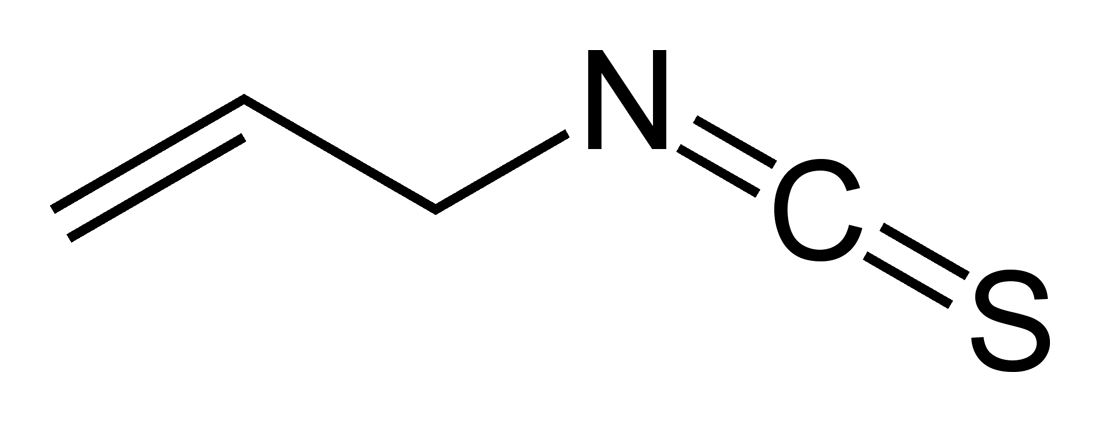
- Allyl isothiocyanate

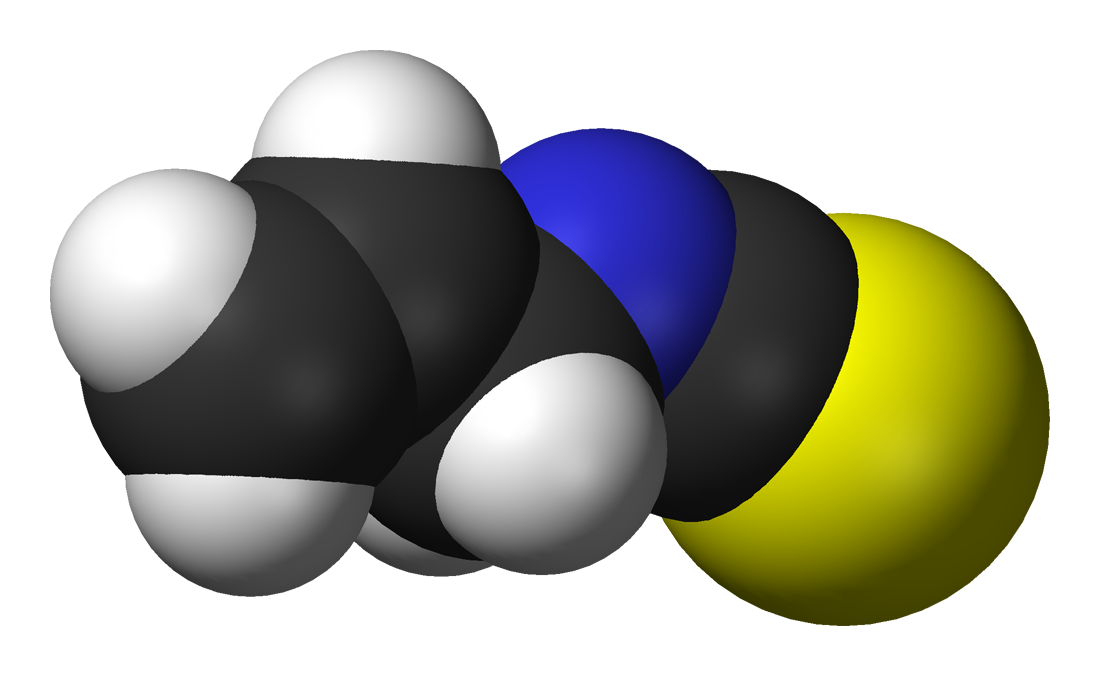
- Space-filling model of allyl isothiocyanate

Names
- Preferred IUPAC name 3-Isothiocyanatoprop-1-ene
- Other names Synthetic mustard oil

Identifiers
CAS Number	57-06-7
3D model (JSmol)	Interactive image
ChEBI	CHEBI:73224
ChEMBL	ChEMBL233248
ChemSpider	21105854
ECHA InfoCard	100.000.281
EC Number	200-309-2
IUPHAR/BPS	2420
KEGG	D02818; C19317
PubChem CID	5971
RTECS number	NX8225000
UNII	BN34FX42G3
UN number	1545
CompTox Dashboard (EPA)	DTXSID3020047
- InChI: InChI=1S/C4H5NS/c1-2-3-5-4-6/h2H,1,3H2 Key: ZOJBYZNEUISWFT-UHFFFAOYSA-N; InChI=1/C4H5NS/c1-2-3-5-4-6/h2H,1,3H2 Key: ZOJBYZNEUISWFT-UHFFFAOYAS
- SMILES: C=CCN=C=S

Properties
Chemical formula	C_{4}H_{5}NS
Molar mass	99.15 g·mol^{−1}
Density	1.013–1.020 g/cm^{3}
Melting point	−102 °C (−152 °F; 171 K)
Boiling point	148 to 154 °C (298 to 309 °F; 421 to 427 K)

Hazards
- GHS labelling
Pictograms	(GHS02: Flammable) (GHS06: Toxic) (GHS07: Exclamation mark) (GHS09: Environmental hazard)
Signal word	Danger
Hazard statements	H226, H301, H310, H315, H319, H330, H335, H410
Precautionary statements	P210, P233, P240, P241, P242, P243, P260, P262, P264, P270, P271, P273, P280, P284, P301+P310, P302+P350, P302+P352, P303+P361+P353, P304+P340, P305+P351+P338, P310, P312, P320, P321, P330, P332+P313, P337+P313, P361, P362, P363, P370+P378, P391, P403+P233, P403+P235, P405, P501
- Except where otherwise noted, data are given for materials in their standard state (at 25 °C [77 °F], 100 kPa). verify (what is ?) Infobox references

Allyl isothiocyanate (AITC) is a naturally occurring unsaturated isothiocyanate. The colorless oil is responsible for the pungent taste of cruciferous vegetables such as mustard, radish, horseradish, and wasabi. This pungency and the lachrymatory effect of AITC are mediated through the TRPA1 and TRPV1 ion channels. It is slightly soluble in water, but more soluble in most organic solvents.

== Biosynthesis and biological functions ==
Allyl isothiocyanate can be obtained from the seeds of black mustard (Rhamphospermum nigrum) or brown Indian mustard (Brassica juncea). When these mustard seeds are broken, the enzyme myrosinase is released and acts on a glucosinolate known as sinigrin to give allyl isothiocyanate. This serves the plant as a defense against herbivores; since it is harmful to the plant itself, it is stored in the harmless form of the glucosinolate, separate from the myrosinase enzyme. When an animal chews the plant, the allyl isothiocyanate is released, repelling the animal. Human appreciation of the pungency is learned.

The compound has been shown to strongly repel fire ants (Solenopsis invicta). AITC vapor is also used as an antimicrobial and shelf life extender in food packaging.

== Production and applications ==
Allyl isothiocyanate is produced commercially by the reaction of allyl chloride and potassium thiocyanate:

CH_{2}=CHCH_{2}Cl + KSCN → CH_{2}=CHCH_{2}NCS + KCl

The product obtained in this fashion is sometimes known as synthetic mustard oil. Allyl thiocyanate isomerizes to the isothiocyanate:

CH_{2}=CHCH_{2}SCN → CH_{2}=CHCH_{2}NCS

Allyl isothiocyanate can also be liberated by dry distillation of the seeds. The product obtained in this fashion is known as volatile oil of mustard.

It is used principally as a flavoring agent in foods. Synthetic allyl isothiocyanate is used as an insecticide, as an anti-mold agent, bacteriocide, and nematicide, and is used in certain cases for crop protection. It is also used in fire alarms for the deaf.

Hydrolysis of allyl isothiocyanate gives allylamine.

== Safety ==
Allyl isothiocyanate has an LD_{50} of 151 mg/kg and is a lachrymator (similar to tear gas or mace).

=== Oncology ===
Based on in vitro experiments and animal models, allyl isothiocyanate exhibits many of the desirable attributes of a cancer chemopreventive agent.

== See also ==
- Mustard plaster, traditional home remedy
- Piperine, the piquant chemical in black pepper
- Capsaicin, the piquant chemical in chili peppers
- Allicin, the piquant flavor chemical in raw garlic
