= Olivacine =

Names
- Preferred IUPAC name 1,5-Dimethyl-6H-indolo[2,3-g]isoquinoline

Identifiers
CAS Number	484-49-1
3D model (JSmol)	Interactive image
ChemSpider	4444757
KEGG	C09230
PubChem CID	5281407
UNII	5WSL5LL2C3
CompTox Dashboard (EPA)	DTXSID10197511
- InChI: InChI=1S/C17H14N2/c1-10-12-7-8-18-11(2)14(12)9-15-13-5-3-4-6-16(13)19-17(10)15/h3-9,19H,1-2H3 Key: ZIXGXMMUKPLXBB-UHFFFAOYSA-N; InChI=1/C17H14N2/c1-10-12-7-8-18-11(2)14(12)9-15-13-5-3-4-6-16(13)19-17(10)15/h3-9,19H,1-2H3 Key: ZIXGXMMUKPLXBB-UHFFFAOYAZ
- SMILES: Cc1c2ccnc(c2cc3c1[nH]c4c3cccc4)C

Properties
Chemical formula	C_{17}H_{14}N_{2}
Molar mass	246.313 g·mol^{−1}
- Except where otherwise noted, data are given for materials in their standard state (at 25 °C [77 °F], 100 kPa). Infobox references

Olivacine is an antimalarial alkaloid.
