= Glucosinolate =

Class of chemical compounds

Glucosinolate structure; side group R varies.

Glucosinolates are natural components of many pungent plants such as mustard, cabbage, and horseradish. The pungency of those plants is due to mustard oils produced from glucosinolates when the plant material is chewed, cut, or otherwise damaged. These natural chemicals most likely contribute to plant defence against pests and diseases, and impart a characteristic bitter flavor property to cruciferous vegetables.

== Occurrence ==
Glucosinolates occur as secondary metabolites of almost all plants of the order Brassicales. This includes the economically important family Brassicaceae as well as Capparaceae and Caricaceae. Outside of the Brassicales, the genera Drypetes and Putranjiva in the family Putranjivaceae, are the only other known occurrence of glucosinolates. Glucosinolates occur in various edible plants such as cabbage (white cabbage, Chinese cabbage, broccoli), Brussels sprouts, watercress, arugula, horseradish, capers, and radishes where the breakdown products often contribute a significant part of the distinctive taste. The glucosinolates are also found in seeds of these plants.

== Chemistry ==
Glucosinolates constitute a natural class of organic compounds that contain sulfur and nitrogen and are derived from glucose and an amino acid. They are water-soluble anions and belong to the glucosides. Every glucosinolate contains a central carbon atom, which is bound to the sulfur atom of the thioglucose group, and via a nitrogen atom to a sulfate group (making a sulfated aldoxime). In addition, the central carbon is bound to a side group; different glucosinolates have different side groups, and it is variation in the side group that is responsible for the variation in the biological activities of these plant compounds. The essence of glucosinolate chemistry is their ability to convert into an isothiocyanate (a "mustard oil") upon hydrolysis of the thioglucoside bond by the enzyme myrosinase.

The semisystematic naming of glucosinolates consists of the chemical name of the group "R" in the diagram followed by "glucosinolate", with or without a space. For example, allylglucosinolate and allyl glucosinolate refer to the same compound: both versions are found in the literature. Isothiocyanates are conventionally written as two words.

The following are some glucosinolates and their isothiocyanate products:

- Allylglucosinolate (sinigrin) is the precursor of allyl isothiocyanate
- Benzylglucosinolate (glucotropaeolin) is the precursor of benzyl isothiocyanate
- Phenethylglucosinolate (gluconasturtiin) is the precursor of phenethyl isothiocyanate
- (R)-4-(methylsulfinyl)butylglucosinolate (glucoraphanin) is the precursor of (R)-4-(methylsulfinyl)butyl isothiocyanate (sulforaphane)
- (R)-2-hydroxybut-3-enylglucosinolate (progoitrin) is probably the precursor of (S)-2-hydroxybut-3-enyl isothiocyanate, which is expected to be unstable and immediately cyclize to form (S)-5-vinyloxazolidine-2-thione (goitrin)

Z form, natural sinigrin

E form, not found naturally

Sinigrin was first of the class to be isolated — in 1839 as its potassium salt. Its chemical structure had been established by 1930, showing that it is a glucose derivative with β-D-glucopyranose configuration. It was unclear at that time whether the C=N bond was in the Z (or syn) form, with sulfur and oxygen substituents on the same side of the double bond, or the alternative E form in which they are on opposite sides. The matter was settled by X-ray crystallography in 1963. It is now known that all natural glucosinolates are of Z form, although both forms can be made in the laboratory. The "ate" ending in the naming of these compounds implies that they are anions at physiological pH and an early name for this allylglucosinolate was potassium myronate. Care must be taken when discussing these compounds since some older publications do not make it clear whether they refer to the anion alone, its corresponding acid or the potassium salt.

== Biochemistry ==
=== Natural diversity from a few amino acids ===
About 132 different glucosinolates are known to occur naturally in plants. They are biosynthesized from amino acids: so-called aliphatic glucosinolates derived from mainly methionine, but also alanine, leucine, isoleucine, or valine. (Most glucosinolates are actually derived from chain-elongated homologues of these amino acids, e.g. glucoraphanin is derived from dihomomethionine, which is methionine chain-elongated twice.) Aromatic glucosinolates include indolic glucosinolates, such as glucobrassicin, derived from tryptophan and others from phenylalanine, its chain-elongated homologue homophenylalanine, and sinalbin derived from tyrosine.

=== Biosynthetic pathway ===
Full details of the sequence of reactions that converts individual amino acids into the corresponding glucosinolate have been studied in the cress Arabidopsis thaliana.

A sequence of seven enzyme-catalysed steps is used. The initial oxidation to an oxime is performed by a CYP79 enzyme (see cytochrome P450). The sulfur atom is incorporated from glutathione (GSH) and the sugar component is added to the resulting thiol derivative by a glycosyltransferase before the final sulfonation step.

=== Enzymatic activation ===
The plants contain the enzyme myrosinase, which, in the presence of water, cleaves off the glucose group from a glucosinolate. The remaining molecule then quickly converts to an isothiocyanate, a nitrile, or a thiocyanate; these are the active substances that serve as defense for the plant. Glucosinolates are also called mustard oil glycosides. The standard product of the reaction is the isothiocyanate (mustard oil); the other two products mainly occur in the presence of specialised plant proteins that alter the outcome of the reaction.

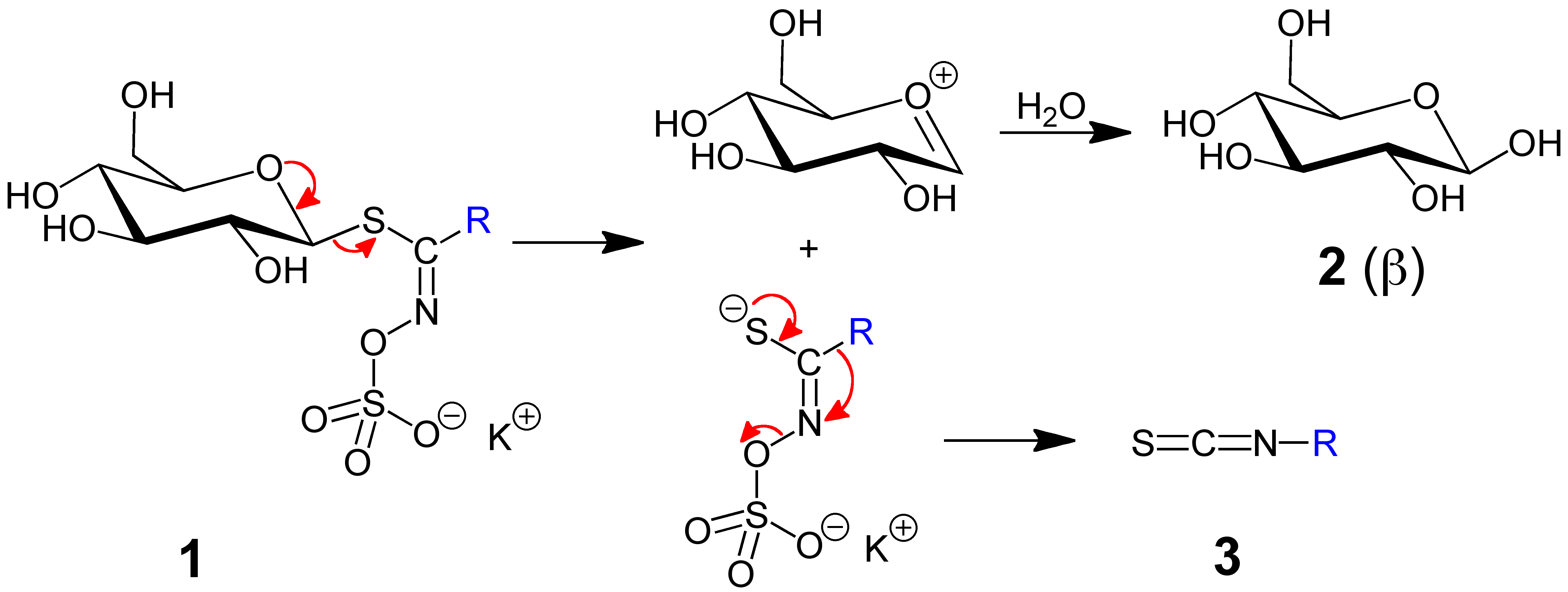
A mustard oil glycoside 1 is converted to an isothiocyanate 3 (mustard oil). Glucose 2 is liberated as well, only the β-form is shown.– R = allyl, benzyl, 2-phenylethyl etc.

In the chemical reaction illustrated above, the red curved arrows in the left side of figure are simplified compared to reality, as the role of the enzyme myrosinase is not shown. However, the mechanism shown is fundamentally in accordance with the enzyme-catalyzed reaction.

In contrast, the reaction illustrated by red curved arrows at the right side of the figure, depicting the Lossen-like rearrangement of atoms resulting in the isothiocyanate, is expected to be non-enzymatic.

To prevent damage to the plant itself, the myrosinase and glucosinolates are stored in separate compartments of the cell or in different cells in the tissue, and come together only or mainly under conditions of physical injury (see Myrosinase).

== Biological effects ==
=== Humans and other mammals ===
==== Toxicity ====
The use of glucosinolate-containing crops as primary food source for animals can have negative effects if the concentration of glucosinolate is higher than what is acceptable for the animal in question, because some glucosinolates have been shown to have toxic effects (mainly as goitrogens and anti-thyroid agents) in livestock at high doses. However, tolerance level to glucosinolates varies even within the same genus (e.g. Acomys cahirinus and Acomys russatus).

Dietary amounts of glucosinolate are not toxic to humans given normal iodine intake.

==== Taste and eating behavior ====
The glucosinolate sinigrin, among others, was shown to be responsible for the bitterness of cooked cauliflower and Brussels sprouts. Glucosinolates may alter animal eating behavior.

==== Research ====
The isothiocyanates formed from glucosinolates are under laboratory research to assess the expression and activation of enzymes that metabolize xenobiotics, such as carcinogens. Observational studies have been conducted to determine if consumption of cruciferous vegetables affects cancer risk in humans, but there is insufficient clinical evidence to indicate that consuming isothiocyanates in cruciferous vegetables is beneficial, according to a 2017 review.

=== Insects ===
Glucosinolates and their products have a negative effect on many insects, resulting from a combination of deterrence and toxicity. In an attempt to apply this principle in an agronomic context, some glucosinolate-derived products can serve as antifeedants, i.e., natural pesticides.

In contrast, the diamondback moth, a pest of cruciferous plants, may recognize the presence of glucosinolates, allowing it to identify the proper host plant. Indeed, a characteristic, specialised insect fauna is found on glucosinolate-containing plants, including butterflies, such as large white, small white, and orange tip, but also certain aphids, moths, such as the southern armyworm, sawflies, and flea beetles. For instance, the large white butterfly deposits its eggs on these glucosinolate-containing plants, and the larvae survive even with high levels of glucosinolates and eat plant material containing glucosinolates. The whites and orange tips all possess the so-called nitrile specifier protein, which diverts glucosinolate hydrolysis toward nitriles rather than reactive isothiocyanates. In contrast, the diamondback moth possesses a completely different protein, glucosinolate sulfatase, which desulfates glucosinolates, thereby making them unfit for degradation to toxic products by myrosinase.

Other kinds of insects (specialised sawflies and aphids) sequester glucosinolates. In specialised aphids, but not in sawflies, a distinct animal myrosinase is found in muscle tissue, leading to degradation of sequestered glucosinolates upon aphid tissue destruction. This diverse panel of biochemical solutions to the same plant chemical plays a key role in the evolution of plant-insect relationships.

== Induced production ==
Plants produce glucosinolates in response to the degree of herbivory being suffered. Their production in relation to atmospheric CO_{2} concentrations is complex: increased CO_{2} can give increased, decreased or unchanged production and there may be genetic variation within the Brassicales.

== See also ==
- Isothiocyanate
