= Mustard oil bomb =

The mustard oil bomb, formerly known as the glucosinolate–myrosinase complex, is a chemical defense system against herbivory found in members of the Brassicaceae (cabbage) family. The mustard oil bomb requires the activation of a common plant secondary metabolite, glucosinolate, by an enzyme, myrosinase. The defense complex is typical among plant defenses against herbivory in that the two molecules are stored in different compartments in the leaves of plants until the leaf is torn by an herbivore. The glucosinolate has a β-glucose and a sulfated oxime. The myrosinase removes the β-glucose to form mustard oils that are toxic to herbivores. The defense system was named a "bomb" by Matile, because it, like a real bomb, is waiting to detonate upon disturbance of the plant tissue.

== Countermeasures ==
There are many examples of biochemical adaptations to the mustard oil bomb. One occurs in the diamondback moth, Plutella xylostella. This worldwide crop pest feeds exclusively on members of the Brassicaceae and has developed a defense against the glucosinolate-myrosinase complex. The moth has an enzyme, a sulfatase, that it uses to desulfate the glucosinolate, meaning the myrosinase cannot locate and remove the β-glucose to form the mustard oils. Plant hosts contain a variety of glucosinolates; while all of them have the β-glucose and sulfated oxime. The diamondback moth, however, can apparently desulfate a wide range of natural glucosinolates - perhaps all.

== See also ==
- Sulforaphane
