= Brussels sprout =

Vegetable

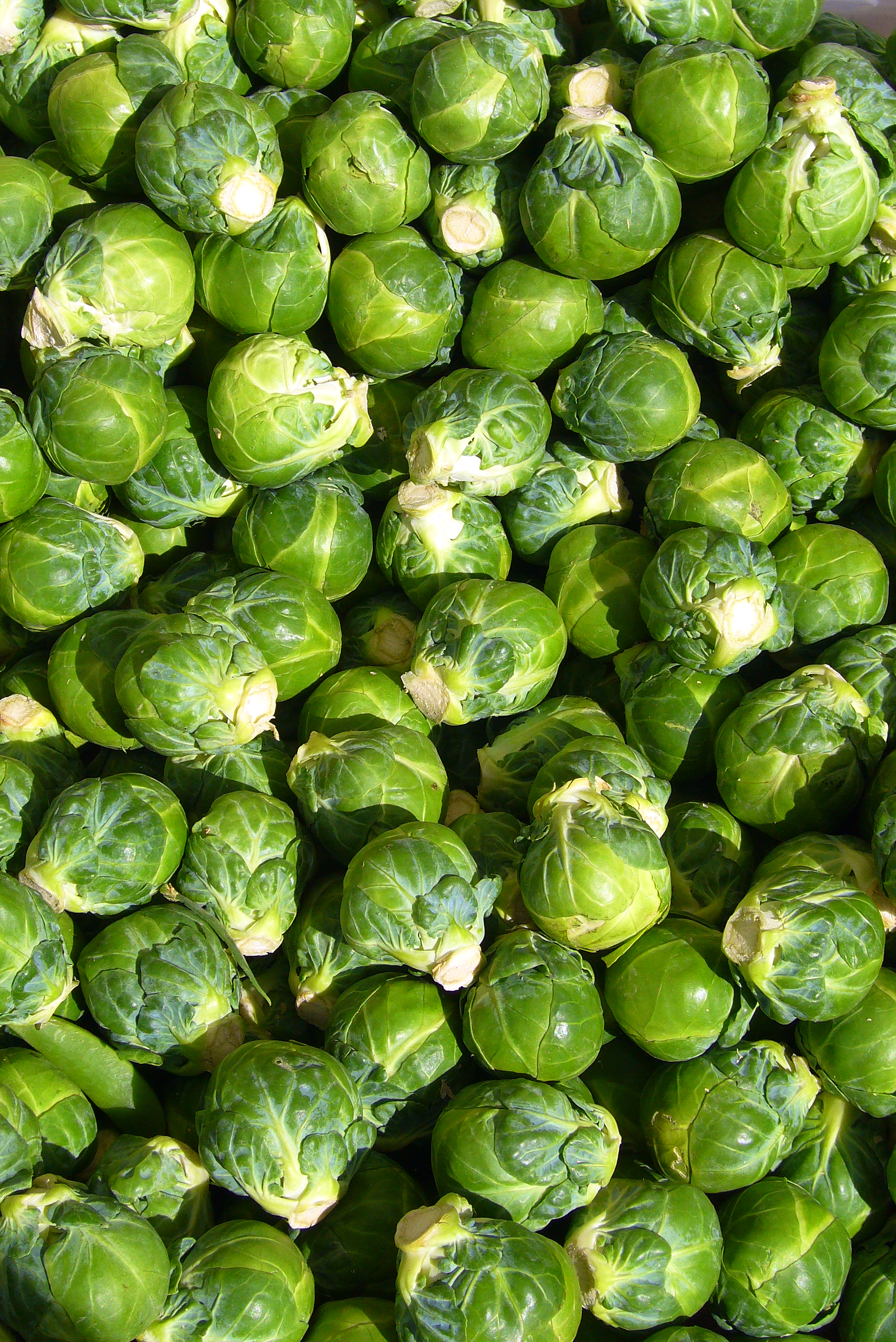
- Brussels sprouts (cultivar unknown)
- Species: Brassica oleracea
- Cultivar group: Gemmifera Group
- Origin: Low Countries (13th century)

The Brussels sprout is a member of the Gemmifera cultivar group of cabbages (Brassica oleracea), grown for its edible buds.

== Etymology ==
Though native to the Mediterranean region with other cabbage species, Brussels sprouts may have first appeared in northern Europe during the 5th century; they were later cultivated in the 13th century near Brussels, Belgium, from which their name derives. The group name gemmifera (or lowercase and italicized gemmifera as a variety name) means "bud-bearing".

== Description ==
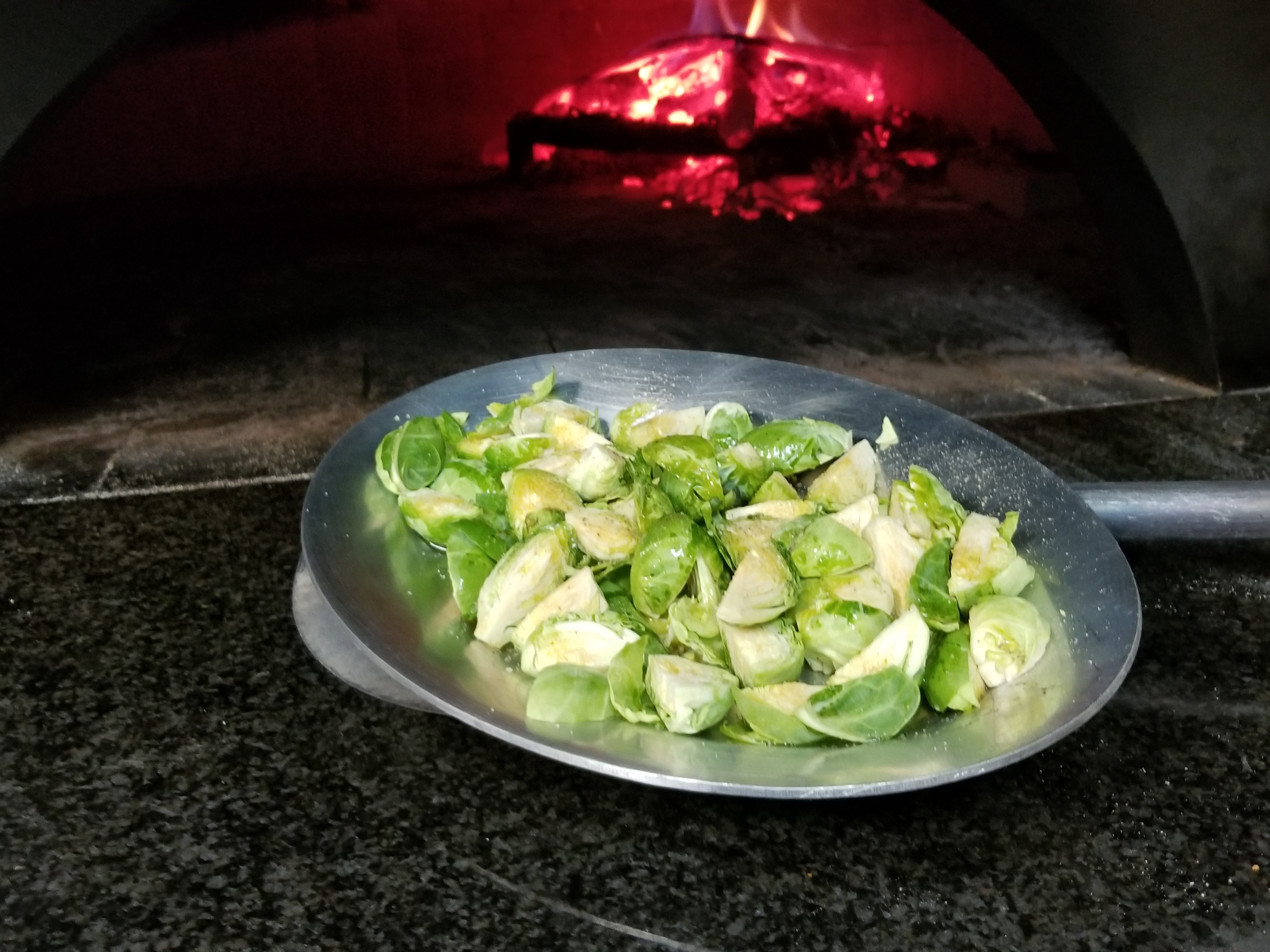
Brussels sprouts prepared for cooking in a pizza oven

The leaf vegetables are typically 1.5–4 centimetres (1/2–1 1/2 inches) in diameter and resemble miniature cabbages.

== Cultivation ==
Predecessors to modern Brussels sprouts were probably cultivated in Ancient Rome. Brussels sprouts as they are now known were grown possibly as early as the 13th century in what is now Belgium. The first written reference dates to 1587. During the 16th century, they enjoyed a popularity in the southern Netherlands that eventually spread throughout the cooler parts of Northern Europe, reaching Britain by the 17th century.

Brussels sprouts grow in temperature ranges of 7–24 °C (45–75 °F), with highest yields at 15–18 °C (59–64 °F). Fields are ready for harvest 90 to 180 days after planting. The edible sprouts grow like buds in helical patterns along the side of long, thick stalks of about 60 to 120 centimetres (24 to 47 inches) in height, maturing over several weeks from the lower to the upper part of the stalk. Sprouts may be picked by hand into baskets, in which case several harvests are made of five to 15 sprouts at a time, or by cutting the entire stalk at once for processing, or by mechanical harvester, depending on variety. Each stalk can produce 1.1 to 1.4 kilograms (2.4 to 3.1 pounds), although the commercial yield is about 900 g (2 lb) per stalk. Harvest season in temperate zones of the northern latitudes is September to March, making Brussels sprouts a traditional winter-stock vegetable. In the home garden, harvest can be delayed as quality does not suffer from freezing. Sprouts are considered to be the sweetest after a frost.

Brussels sprouts are a cultivar group of the same species as broccoli, cabbage, collard greens, kale, and kohlrabi; they are cruciferous (they belong to the family Brassicaceae; old name Cruciferae). Many cultivars are available; some are purple, such as 'Ruby Crunch' or 'Red Bull'. The purple varieties are hybrids between purple cabbage and regular green Brussels sprouts developed by a Dutch botanist in the 1940s, yielding a variety with some of the red cabbage's purple colors and greater sweetness.

In the 1990s, the Dutch scientist Hans van Doorn identified the chemicals that make Brussels sprouts bitter: sinigrin and progoitrin. This enabled Dutch seed companies to cross-breed archived low-bitterness varieties with modern high-yield varieties, over time producing a significant increase in the popularity of the vegetable.

== Production ==
In Continental Europe, the largest producers are the Netherlands (82,000 metric tons) and Germany (10,000 tons). The United Kingdom has production comparable to that of the Netherlands, but its crop is generally not exported.

Second to the Netherlands in export volume is Mexico, where the climate allows nearly year-round production. The Baja region is the main supplier to the US market, but produce also comes from the Mexicali, San Luis and coastal areas.

It is unclear when Brussels sprouts were introduced to the United States, but French settlers in Louisiana are known to have grown them. The first commercial plantings began in the Louisiana delta in 1925, and much of these plantings would move to the Californian Central Coast by 1939. Currently [when?], several thousand acres are planted in coastal areas of San Mateo, Santa Cruz, and Monterey counties of California, which offer an ideal combination of coastal fog and cool temperatures year-round. The harvest season lasts from June through January.

Most U.S. production is in California, with a smaller percentage of the crop grown in Skagit Valley, Washington, where cool springs, mild summers, and rich soil abounds, and to a lesser degree on Long Island, New York. Total US production is around 32,000 tons, with a value of $27 million.

About 80 to 85% of U.S. production is for the frozen food market, with the remainder for fresh consumption. Once harvested, sprouts last 3–5 weeks under ideal near-freezing conditions before wilting and discoloring, and about half as long at refrigerator temperature. North American varieties are generally 2.5–5 cm (1–2 in) in diameter.

Brussels sprouts, raw (edible parts)
Nutritional value per 100 g (3.5 oz)
- Energy: 179 kJ (43 kcal)
- Carbohydrates: 8.95 g
- Sugars: 2.2 g
- Dietary fibre: 3.8 g
- Fat: 0.3 g
- Protein: 3.48 g
Vitamins and minerals
Vitamins	Quantity %DV^{†}
Vitamin A equiv. beta-Carotene lutein zeaxanthin	4% 38 μg 4% 450 μg 1590 μg
Thiamine (B1)	12% 0.139 mg
Riboflavin (B2)	7% 0.09 mg
Niacin (B3)	5% 0.745 mg
Pantothenic acid (B5)	6% 0.309 mg
Vitamin B6	13% 0.219 mg
Folate (B9)	15% 61 μg
Choline	3% 19.1 mg
Vitamin C	94% 85 mg
Vitamin E	6% 0.88 mg
Vitamin K	148% 177 μg
Minerals	Quantity %DV^{†}
Calcium	3% 42 mg
Iron	8% 1.4 mg
Magnesium	5% 23 mg
Manganese	15% 0.337 mg
Phosphorus	6% 69 mg
Potassium	13% 389 mg
Sodium	1% 25 mg
Zinc	4% 0.42 mg
- Other constituents: Quantity
- Water: 86 g
- approx. 5-10 sprouts per 100 g Link to USDA Database entry
- ^{†}Percentages estimated using US recommendations for adults, except for potassium, which is estimated based on expert recommendation from the National Academies.

== Uses ==
=== Nutrition ===
Raw Brussels sprouts are 86% water, 9% carbohydrates, 3% protein, and negligible fat (table). In a reference amount of 100 g (3.5 oz), they supply high levels (20% or more of the Daily Value, DV) of vitamin C (94% DV) and vitamin K (148% DV), with more moderate amounts of B vitamins; dietary minerals and fiber exist in moderate to low amounts (table).

=== Culinary ===
The most common method of preparing Brussels sprouts for cooking begins with cutting the buds off the stalk. Any surplus stem is cut away, and any loose surface leaves are peeled and discarded. Once cut and cleaned, the buds are typically cooked by boiling, steaming, stir-frying, grilling, slow cooking, or roasting. Some cooks make a single cut or a cross in the center of the stem to aid the penetration of heat, or cut the sprouts in half to maximize the flat surface area and caramelization. The cross-cut may, however, be ineffective, since it is commonly believed to cause the sprouts to be waterlogged when boiled.

Overcooking renders the buds gray and soft, and they then develop a strong flavor and odor that some dislike for its garlic- or onion-odor properties. The odor is associated with the glucosinolate sinigrin, a sulfur compound having characteristic pungency. For taste, roasting Brussels sprouts is a common way to cook them to enhance flavor. Common toppings or additions include Parmesan cheese and butter, balsamic vinegar, brown sugar, chestnuts, or pepper.

== Gallery ==
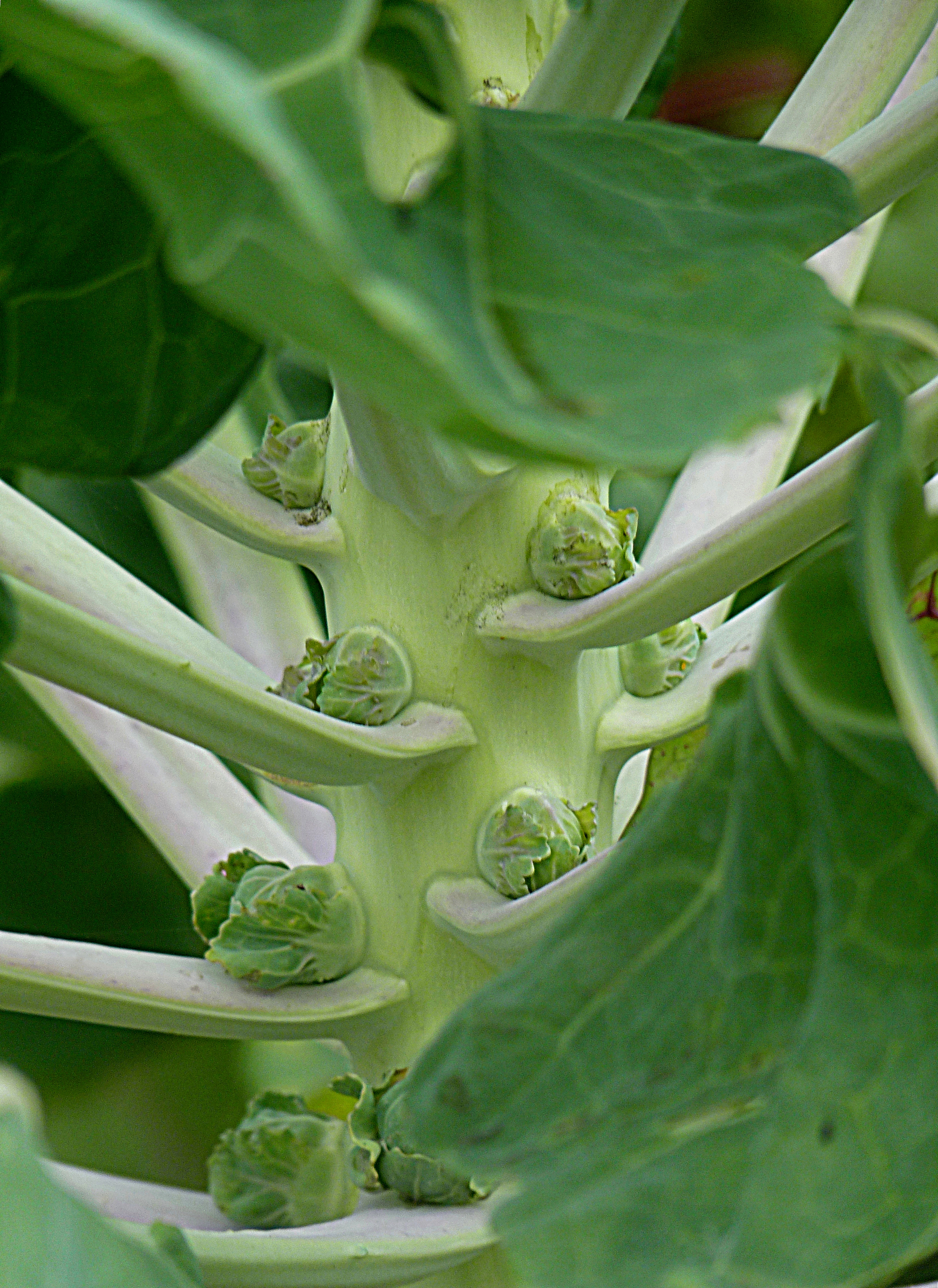
Brussels sprouts at the beginning of their formation

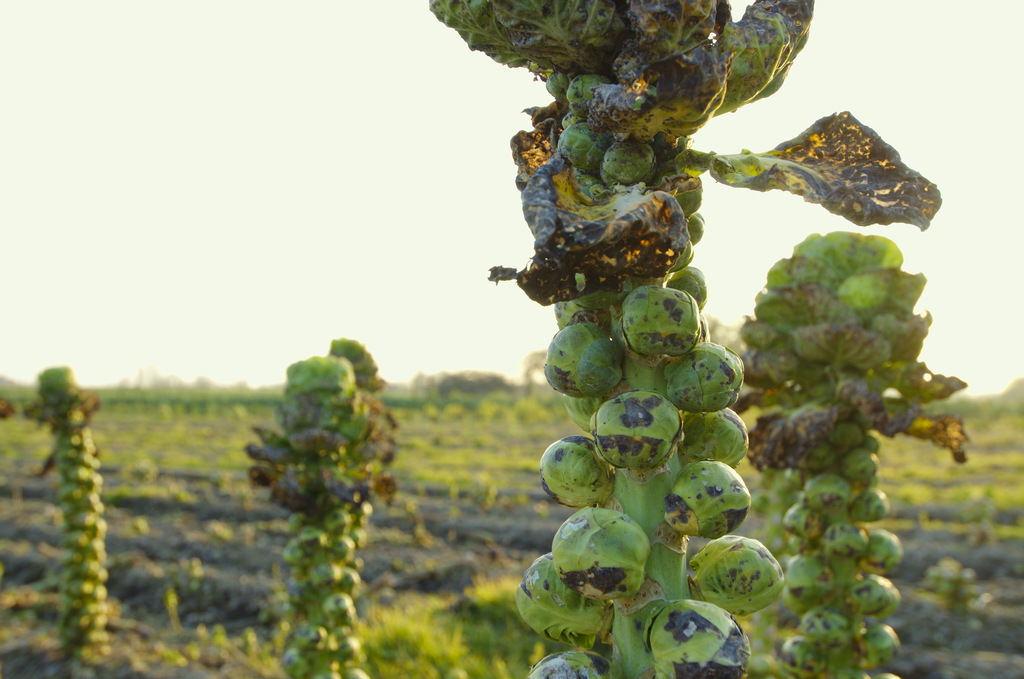
Brussels sprouts ready for harvest

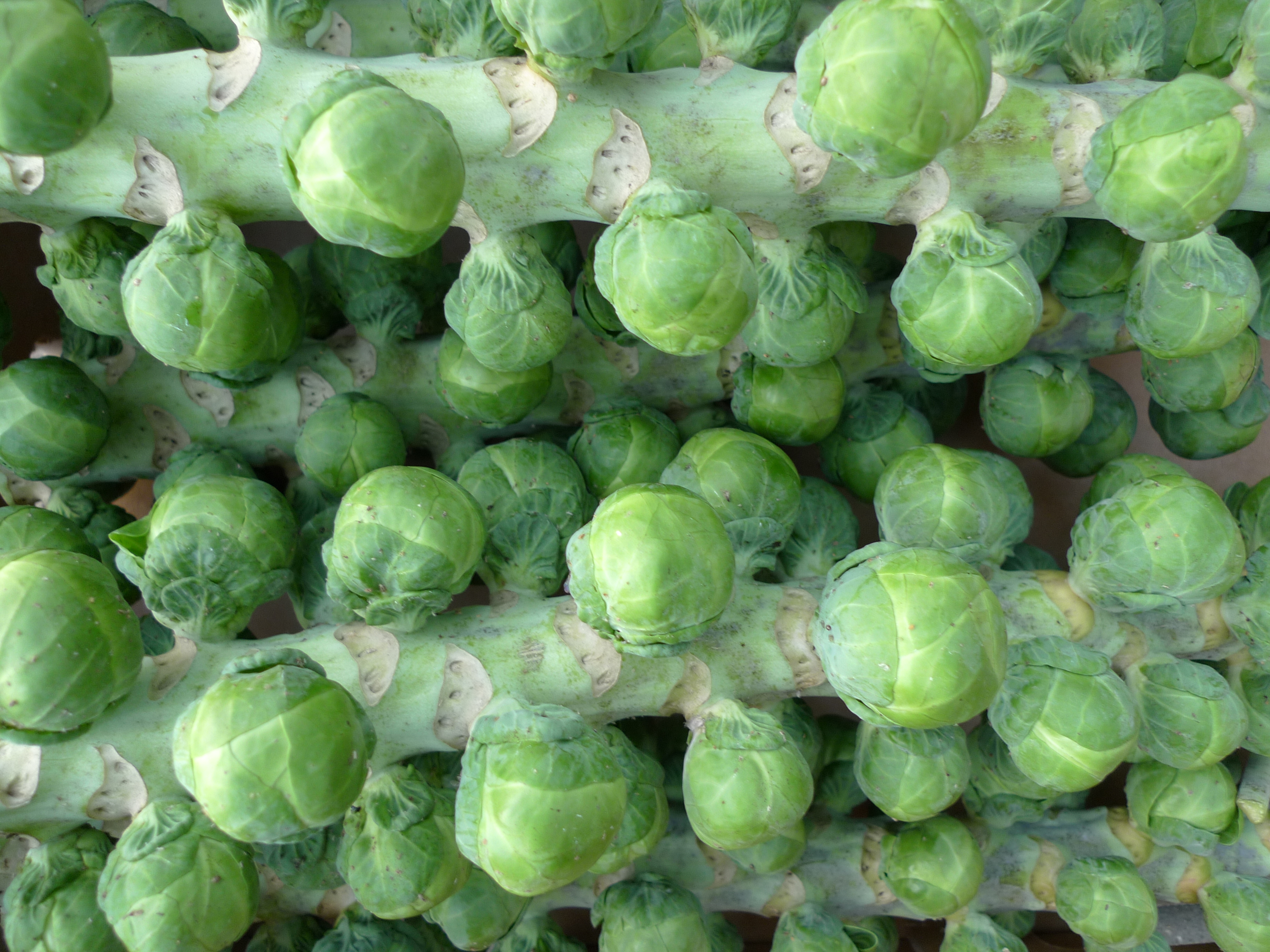
Harvested Brussels sprouts on stalks

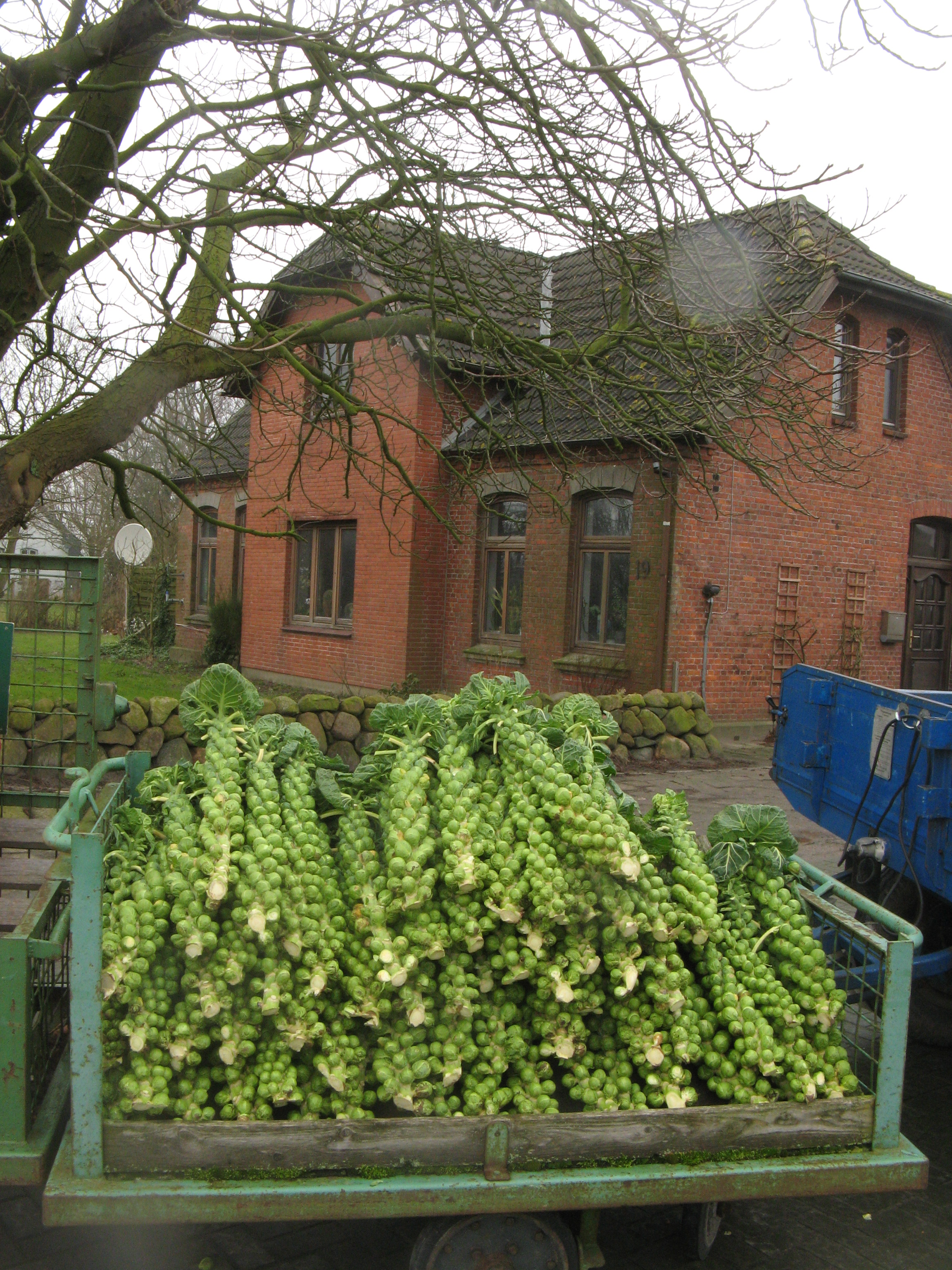
Fresh Brussels sprouts being transported from a farm

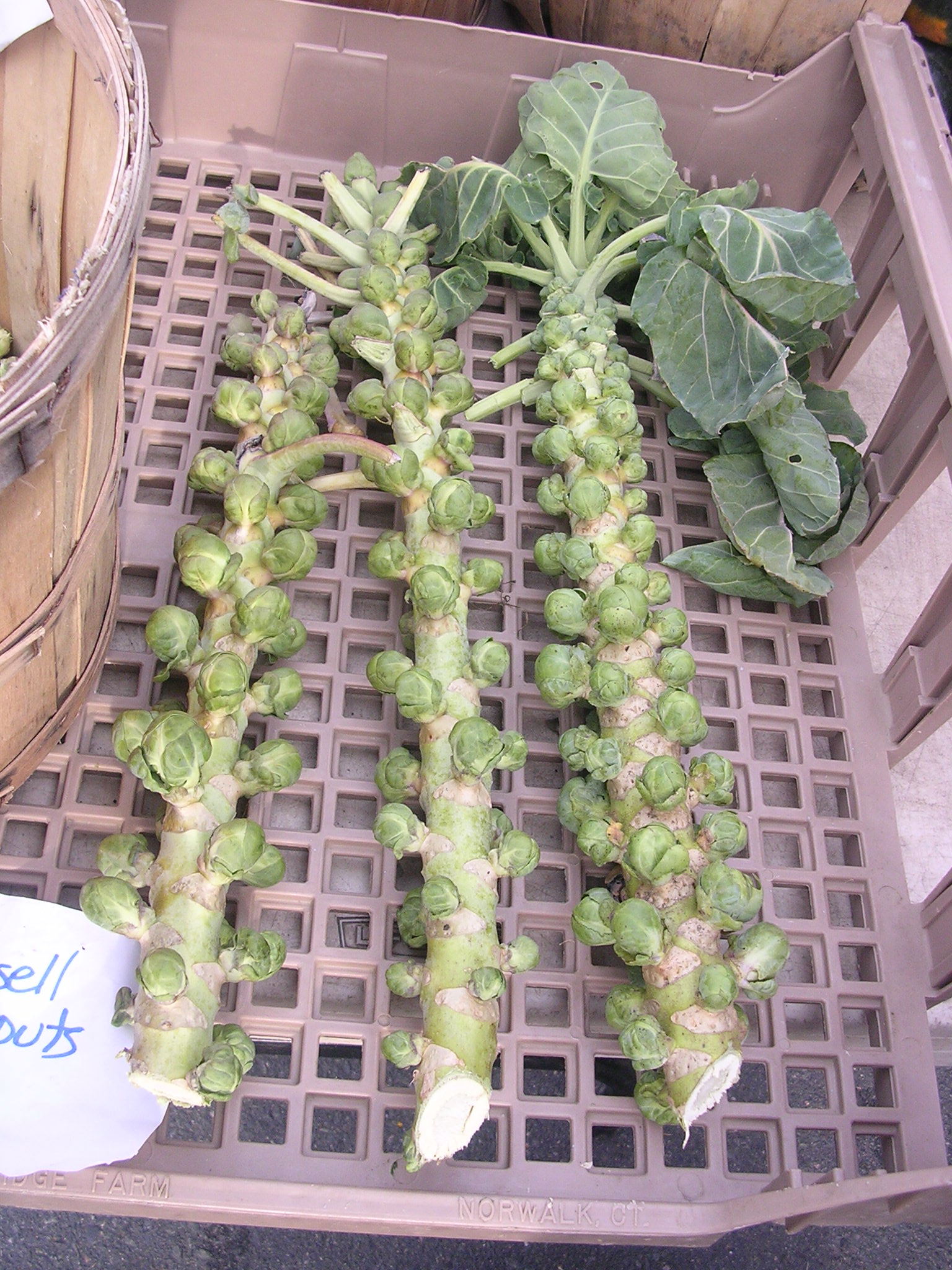
Brussels sprouts on stalks at a farmers market

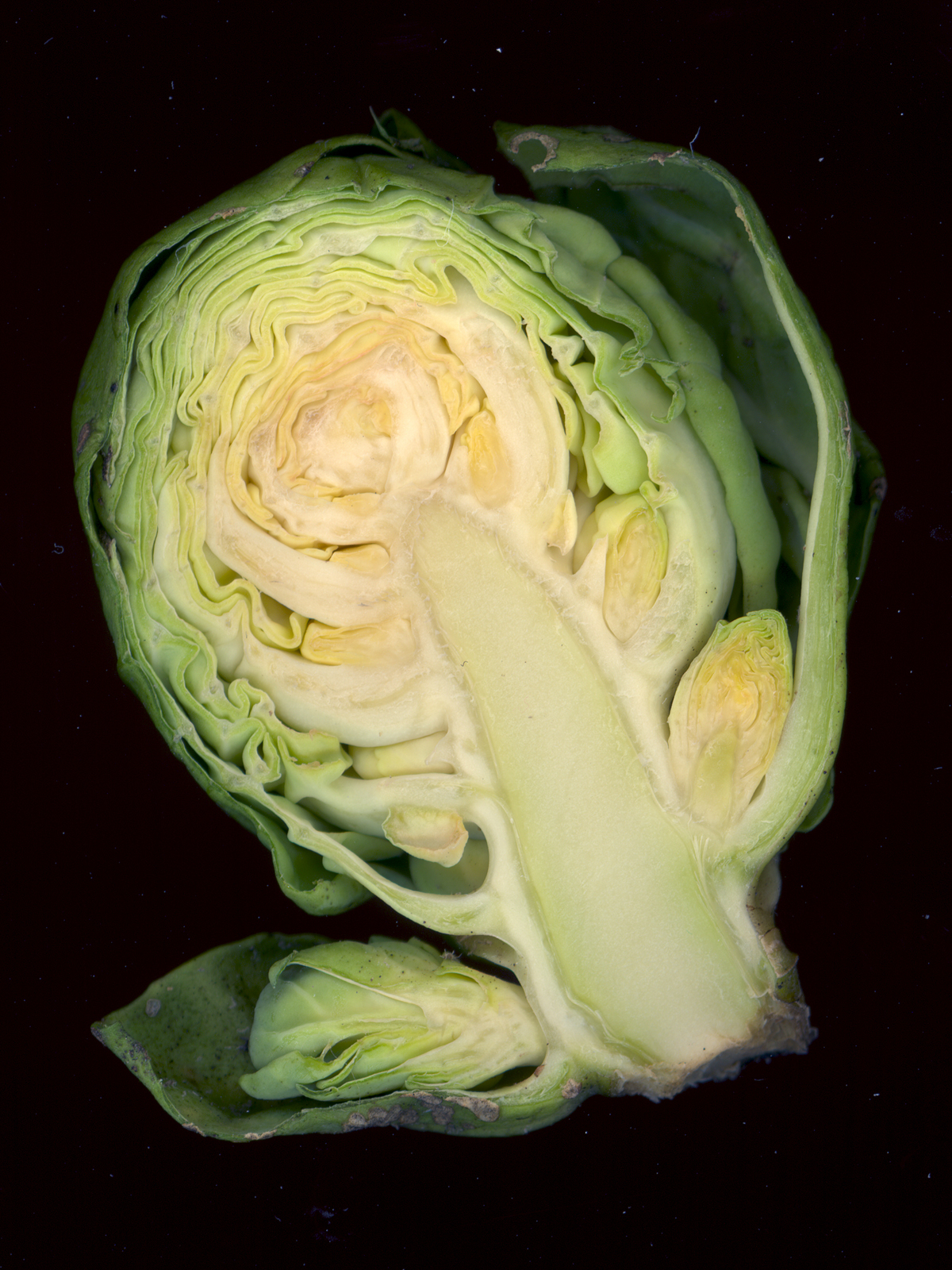
Brussels sprout sliced in half
