= Myrosinase =

Class of enzymes

Thioglucosidase (Myrosinase)
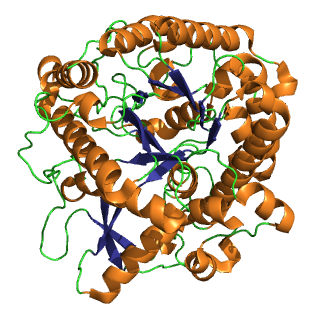
- Myrosinase from Sinapis alba. PDB 1e4m

Identifiers
- EC no.: 3.2.1.147
- CAS no.: 9025-38-1

Databases
- BRENDA: enzyme data
- ExPASy: NiceZyme view
- KEGG: enzyme entry
- MetaCyc: metabolic pathway
- Rhea: reactions
- PDB structures: RCSB PDB PDBe PDBsum
- Gene Ontology: AmiGO / QuickGO
Search
- PMC: articles
- PubMed: articles
- NCBI: proteins

Myrosinase (EC 3.2.1.147, thioglucoside glucohydrolase, sinigrinase, and sinigrase) is a family of enzymes involved in plant defense against herbivores, specifically the mustard oil bomb. The three-dimensional structure has been elucidated and is available in the PDB (see links in the infobox).

A member of the glycoside hydrolase family, myrosinase possesses several similarities with the more ubiquitous O-glycosidases. However, myrosinase is the only known enzyme found in nature that can cleave a thio-linked glucose. Its known biological function is to catalyze the hydrolysis of a class of compounds called glucosinolates.

== Myrosinase activity ==
Myrosinase is regarded as a defense-related enzyme and is capable of hydrolyzing glucosinolates into various compounds, some of which are toxic.

=== Mechanism ===
Myrosinase catalyzes the chemical reaction

a thioglucoside + H_{2}O $\rightleftharpoons$ a sugar + a thiol

Thus, the two substrates of this enzyme are thioglucoside and H_{2}O, whereas its two products are sugar and thiol.

In the presence of water, myrosinase cleaves off the glucose group from a glucosinolate. The remaining molecule then quickly converts to a thiocyanate, an isothiocyanate, or a nitrile; these are the active substances that serve as defense for the plant. The hydrolysis of glucosinolates by myrosinase can yield a variety of products, depending on various physiological conditions such as pH and the presence of certain cofactors. All known reactions have been observed to share the same initial steps. (See Figure 2.) First, the β-thioglucoside linkage is cleaved by myrosinase, releasing D-glucose. The resulting aglycone undergoes a spontaneous Lossen-like rearrangement, releasing a sulfate. The last step in the mechanism is subject to the greatest variety depending on the physiological conditions under which the reaction takes place. At neutral pH, the primary product is the isothiocyanate. Under acidic conditions (pH < 3), and in the presence of ferrous ions or epithiospecifer proteins, the formation of nitriles is favored instead.

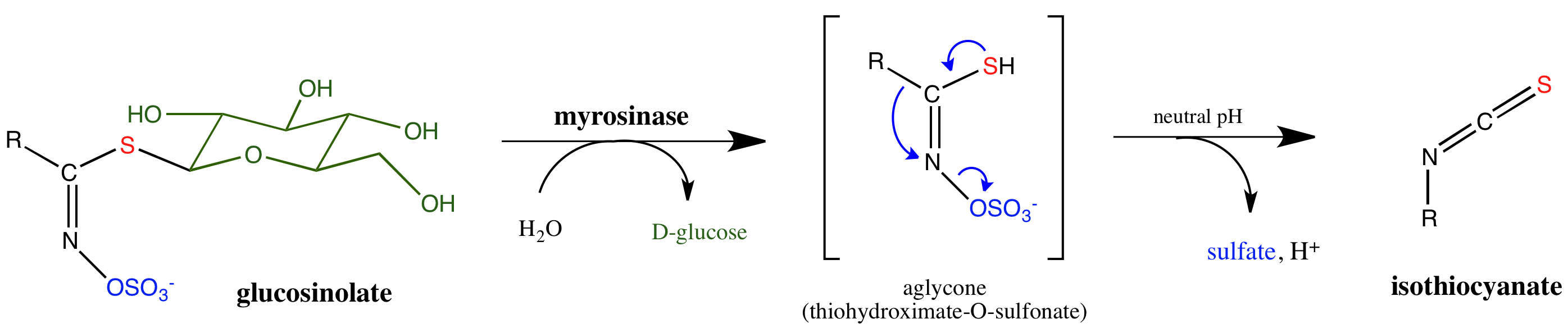
Figure 2: Mechanism of glucosinolate hydrolysis by myrosinase.

=== Cofactors and inhibitors ===
Ascorbate is a known cofactor of myrosinase, serving as a base catalyst in glucosinolate hydrolysis. For example, myrosinase isolated from daikon (Raphanus sativus) demonstrated an increase in V_{max} from 2.06 μmol/min per mg of protein to 280 μmol/min per mg of protein on the substrate, allyl glucosinolate (sinigrin), when in the presence of 500 μM ascorbate. Sulfate, a byproduct of glucosinolate hydrolysis, has been identified as a competitive inhibitor of myrosinase. In addition, 2-F-2-deoxybenzylglucosinolate, which was synthesized specifically to study the mechanism of myrosinase, inhibits the enzyme by trapping one of the glutamic acid residues in the active site, Glu409.

=== Structure ===
Myrosinase exists as a dimer with subunits of 60-70 kDa each. X-ray crystallography of myrosinase isolated from Sinapis alba revealed that the two subunits are linked by a zinc atom. The prominence of salt bridges, disulfide bridges, hydrogen bonding, and glycosylation are thought to contribute to the enzyme’s stability, especially when the plant is under attack and experiences severe tissue damage. A feature of many β-glucosidases are catalytic glutamate residues at their active sites, but two of these have been replaced by a single glutamine residue in myrosinase. Ascorbate has been shown to substitute for the activity of the glutamate residues. (See Figure 3 for mechanism.)

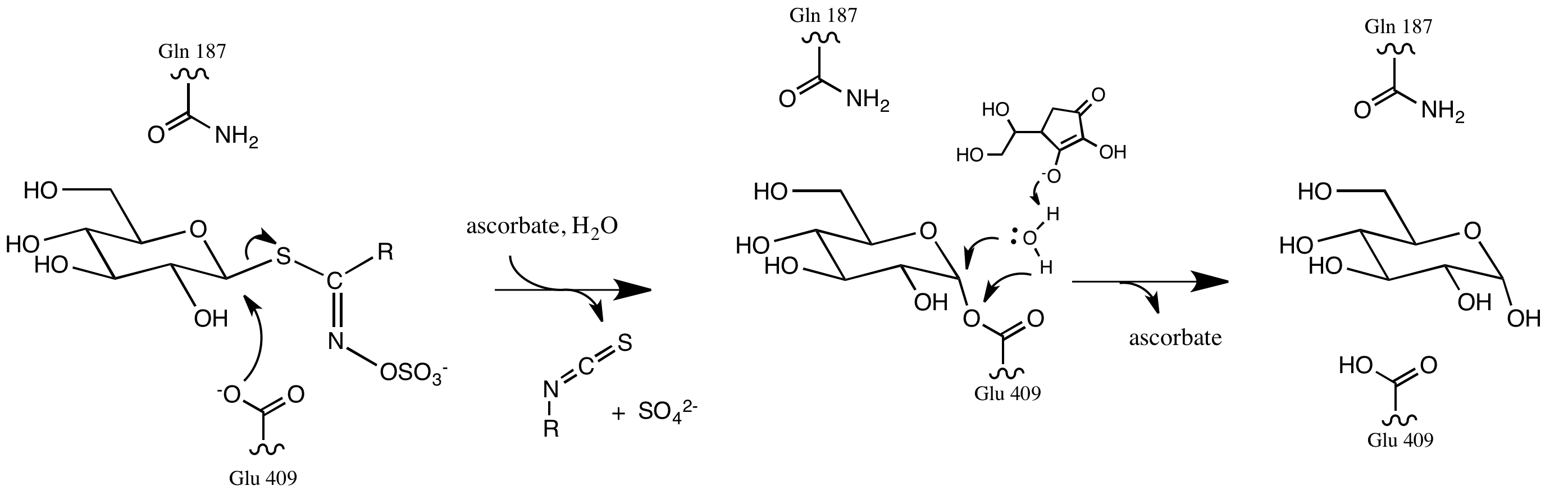
Figure 3: Active site of myrosinase during the first step of glucosinolate hydrolysis. Here, ascorbate is used as a cofactor to substitute for the missing second catalytic glutamate in order to cleave the thio-linked glucose.

== Biological function ==
Myrosinase and its natural substrate, glucosinolate, are known to be part of the plant’s defense response. When the plant is attacked by pathogens, insects, or other herbivores, the plant uses myrosinase to convert glucosinolates, which are otherwise-benign, into toxic products like isothiocyanates, thiocyanates, and nitriles.

=== Compartmentalization in plants ===
The glucosinolate-myrosinase defensive system is packaged in the plant in a unique manner. Plants store myrosinase glucosinolates by compartmentalization, such that the latter is released and activated only when the plant is under attack. Myrosinase is stored largely as myrosin grains in the vacuoles of particular idioblasts called myrosin cells, but have also been reported in protein bodies or vacuoles, and as cytosolic enzymes that tend to bind to membranes. Glucosinolates are stored in adjacent but separate "S-cells." When the plant experiences tissue damage, the myrosinase comes into contact with glucosinolates, quickly activating them into their potent, antibacterial form. The most potent of such products are isothiocyanates, followed by thiocyanates and nitriles.

=== Evolution ===
Plants known to have evolved a myrosinase-glucosinolate defense system include: white mustard (Sinapis alba), garden cress (Lepidium sativum), wasabi (Wasabia japonica), and daikon (Raphanus sativus), as well as several members of the family Brassicaceae, including yellow mustard (Brassica juncea), rape seed (Brassica napus), and common dietary brassicas like broccoli, cauliflower, cabbage, bok choy, and kale. The bitter aftertaste of many of these vegetables can often be attributed to the hydrolysis of glucosinolates upon tissue damage during food preparation or when consuming these vegetables raw. Papaya seeds use this method of defense, but not the fruit pulp itself.

Myrosinase has also been isolated from the cabbage aphid. This suggests coevolution of the cabbage aphid with its main food source. The aphid employs a similar defense strategy to plants. Like its main food source, the cabbage aphid compartmentalizes its native myrosinase and the glucosinolates it ingests. When the cabbage aphid is attacked and its tissues are damaged, its stored glucosinolates are activated, producing isothiocyanates and deterring predators from attacking other aphids.

== Historical relevance and modern applications ==
=== Agriculture ===
Historically, crops like rapeseed that contained the glucosinolate-myrosinase system were deliberately bred to minimize glucosinolate content, since rapeseed in animal feed was proving toxic to livestock.

The glucosinolate-myrosinase system has been investigated as a possible biofumigant to protect crops against pests. The potent glucosinolate hydrolysis products (GHPs) could be sprayed onto crops to deter herbivory. Another option would be to use techniques in genetic engineering to introduce the glucosinolate-myrosinase system in crops as a means of fortifying their resistance against pests.

=== Culinary ===
Myrosinase is responsible for generating much of the characteristic pungency of mustard, horseradish and wasabi. Myrosinase is found in specialist myrosin cells within mustard seeds. Upon crushing them, myrosinase is released and hydrolyses the glucosinolates present in the seed. In brown and black mustards, the main glucosinolate sinigrin predominantly gives allyl isothiocyanate, whereas white mustard is dominated by sinalbin, which produces 4-hydroxybenzyl isothiocyanate. Hydrating the crushed seed mixture creates an aqueous environment that permits myrosinase-mediated hydrolysis. The traditional addition of vinegar reduces the pH, causing a mild reduction in myrosinase activity, thereby moderating the rate of production of the pungent isothiocyanate compounds. The maceration steps in the production of Dijon mustard allow more time both to produce the isothiocyanates and to allow these volatile compounds to dissipate.

In wasabi, the action of grating similarly activates endogenous myrosinase, which hydrolyses sinigrin to produce allyl isothiocyanate, providing its characteristic pungent flavour. A family of other isothiocyanates, the ω-methylthioalkyl isothiocyanates, gives wasabi its 'fresh green' taste. These volatiles are produced very quickly due to the high water content of the rhizome, and are also quickly lost; hence fresh wasabi is grated to order. The wasabi myrosinase is particularly large, having a molecular weight of 580 Kd compared to 120–150 Kd for mustard or 90 Kd for Aspergillus niger, which may contribute to its thermal instability. Thus, commercial preparations of wasabi paste frequently rely on the enzymatic activity of horseradish or mustard paste, despite the risk of introducing unwanted flavors.

=== Health effects ===
Isothiocyanates, the primary product of glucosinolate hydrolysis, have been known to prevent iodine uptake in the thyroid, causing goiters. Isothiocyanates in high concentrations may cause hepatotoxicity. There is insufficient scientific evidence that consuming cruciferous vegetables with increased intake of isothiocyanates affects the risk of human diseases.
