= Mustard oil =

Oil derived from mustard plants

Mustard oil extraction in a traditional way

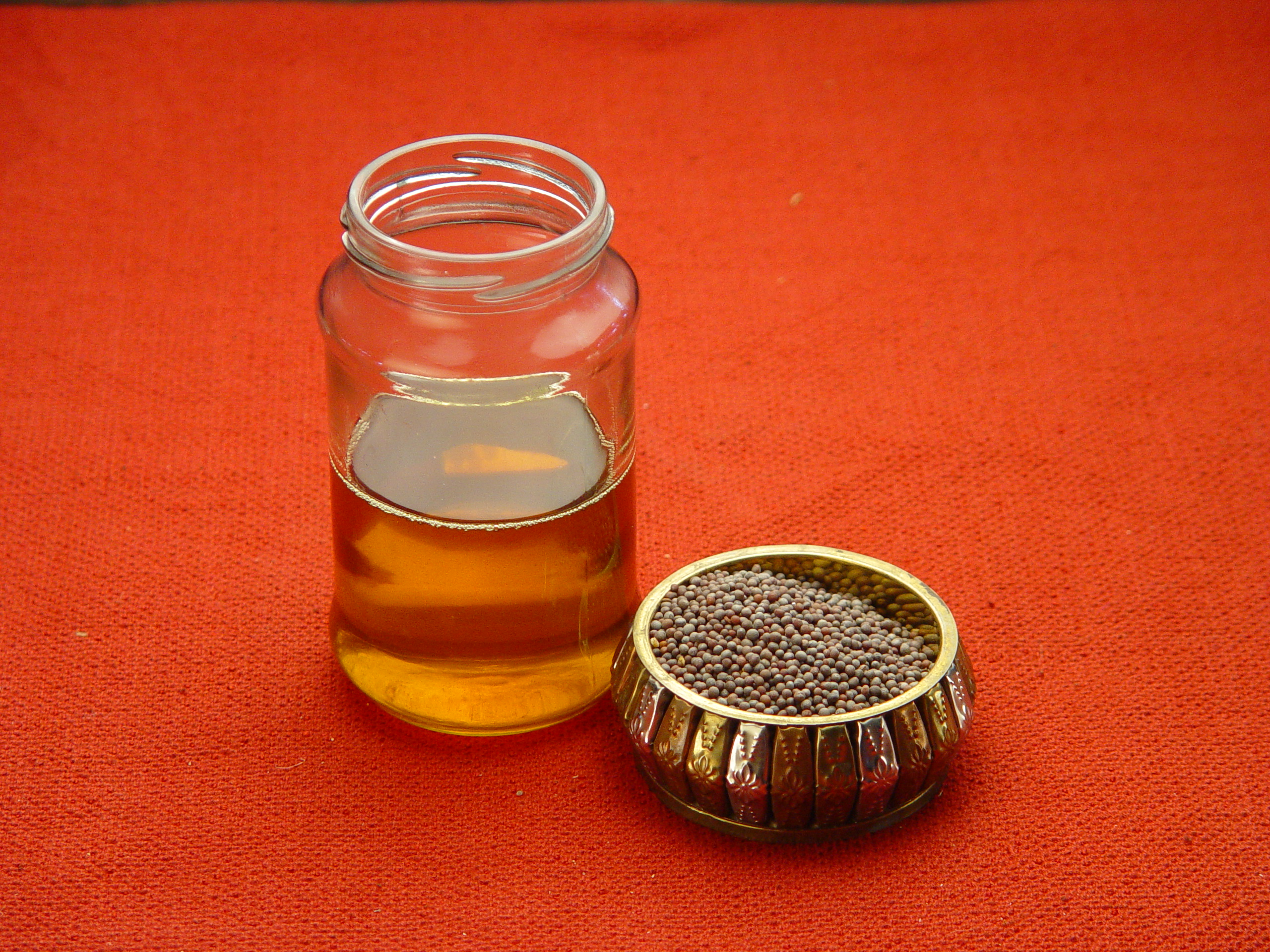
Mustard oil and seeds

Mustard oil refers to either the pressed oil of the mustard plant used for cooking or its pungent essential (or volatile) oil.

Pressed mustard oil is used as cooking oil in many South Asian cuisines; however, sale is restricted in some North American and European countries due to high levels of erucic acid, though some varieties have lower erucic acid content.

The essential oil is produced by grinding mustard seed, mixing the grounds with water, and isolating the resulting volatile oil by distillation. It can also be produced by dry distillation of the seed.

== History ==
Mustard oil was likely produced in the ancient Jewish town of Huqoq, in modern-day Israel. This is suggested by distinctive agricultural features found there, such as semi-circular wine vats with steep slopes and lower troughs. Scholars believe these structures, dating to Roman or Byzantine times, were used to crush mustard pods to make oil. Mustard production in Huqoq is also documented in the Jerusalem Talmud.

== Pressed oil ==
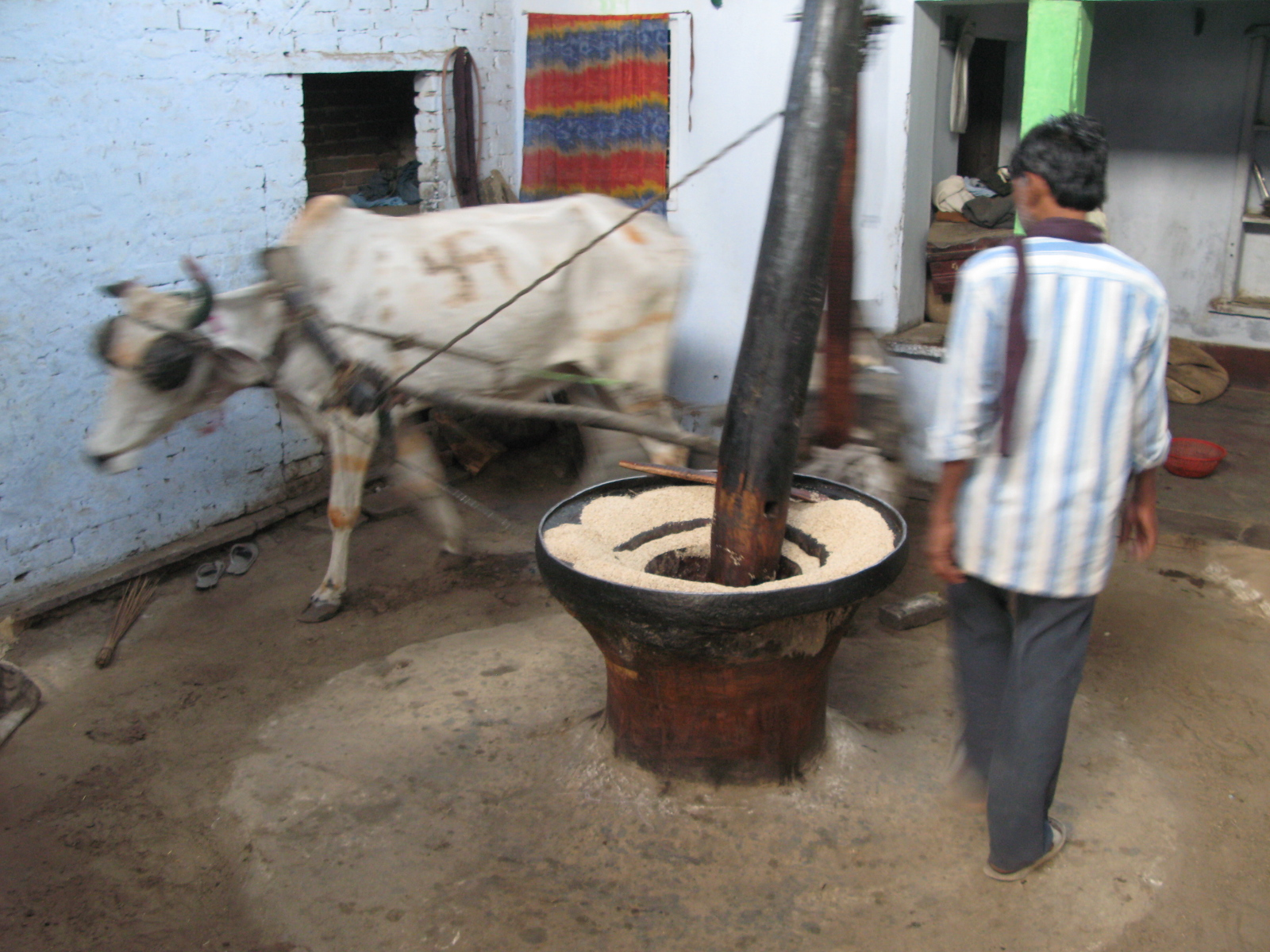
Ox-powered mill grinding mustard seed for oil

Oil makes up about 30% of mustard seeds. It can be produced from black mustard (Brassica nigra), brown mustard (B. juncea), and white mustard (B. alba).

=== Culinary use ===
Having a distinctive pungent taste, the use of the oil is a feature of predominantly Assamese, Odia, Bengali, Nepalese and North Indian cooking, as well as Bangladeshi cuisine. It is sometimes used as a substitute for ghee.

=== Chemical composition ===
Its pungent flavor is due to allyl isothiocyanate, a phytochemical of plants in the mustard family, Brassicaceae (for example, cabbage, horseradish or wasabi).

Mustard oil has about 60% monounsaturated fatty acids (42% erucic acid and 12% oleic acid); it has about 21% polyunsaturated fats (6% the omega-3 alpha-linolenic acid and 15% the omega-6 linoleic acid), and it has about 12% saturated fats.

=== Erucic acid in canola oil ===
Mustard oil can have up to 50% erucic acid – a component of canola oil, which is deemed as a safe food ingredient for human consumption when the erucic acid level does not exceed 2% of the total fatty acids and the canola oil is pure.

=== Regulation ===
The U.S. Food and Drug Administration prohibits the import or sale of expressed mustard oil in the U.S. for use in cooking due to its high erucic acid content. By contrast, the FDA classifies essential mustard oil, which has a much lower erucic acid content, as generally recognized as safe, and allows its use in food. Expressed mustard oil is permitted in the U.S. as a massage oil, with a required "for external use only" label.

== Nutrition ==
Mustard oil (per 100 g) contains 884 calories of food energy and is 100% fat. The fat composition is 11% saturated fat, 59% monounsaturated fat, and 21% polyunsaturated fat.

== Essential oil ==
The pungency of the condiment mustard results when ground mustard seeds are mixed with water, vinegar, or other liquid (or even when chewed). Under these conditions, a chemical reaction between the enzyme myrosinase and a glucosinolate known as sinigrin from the seeds of black mustard (Brassica nigra) or brown Indian mustard (Brassica juncea) produces allyl isothiocyanate. By distillation one can produce a very sharp-tasting essential oil, sometimes called volatile oil of mustard, containing more than 92% allyl isothiocyanate. The pungency of allyl isothiocyanate is due to the activation of the TRPA1 ion channel in sensory neurons. White mustard (Brassica hirta) does not yield allyl isothiocyanate, but the milder 4-Hydroxybenzyl isothiocyanate degraded from sinalbin rather than sinigrin.

Allyl isothiocyanate serves the plant as a defense against herbivores. Since it is harmful to the plant, it is stored in the harmless form of a glucosinolate, separate from the enzyme myrosinase. Once the herbivore chews the plant, the noxious allyl isothiocyanate is produced. Allyl isothiocyanate is also responsible for the pungent taste of horseradish and wasabi. It can be produced synthetically, sometimes known as synthetic mustard oil.

== See also ==
- List of mustard brands
- Mustard (condiment)
- Mustard cake
