= Sinapistrum =

Sinapistrum can be refer to the following plant genera:

- Sinapistrum Chevall., a synonym of the genus Sinapis L.
- Sinapistrum Mill., a synonym of the genus Cleome L.
- Sinapistrum Spach, a synonym of the genus Mutarda Bernh.
