= Mustard (condiment) =

Condiment made from mustard seeds

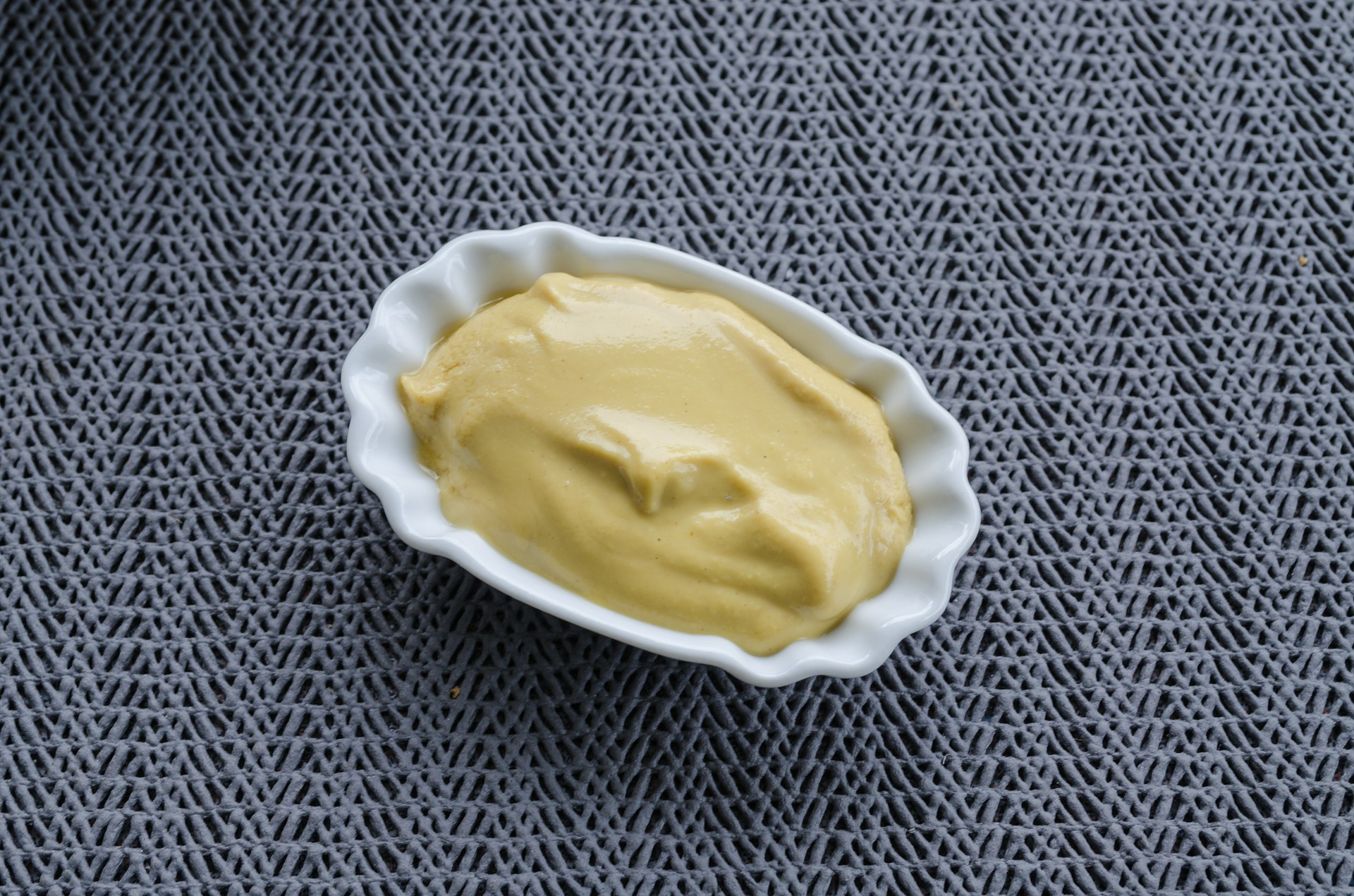
- Course: Condiment
- Region or state: Worldwide distribution
- Main ingredients: Mustard seed, water, vinegar, salt

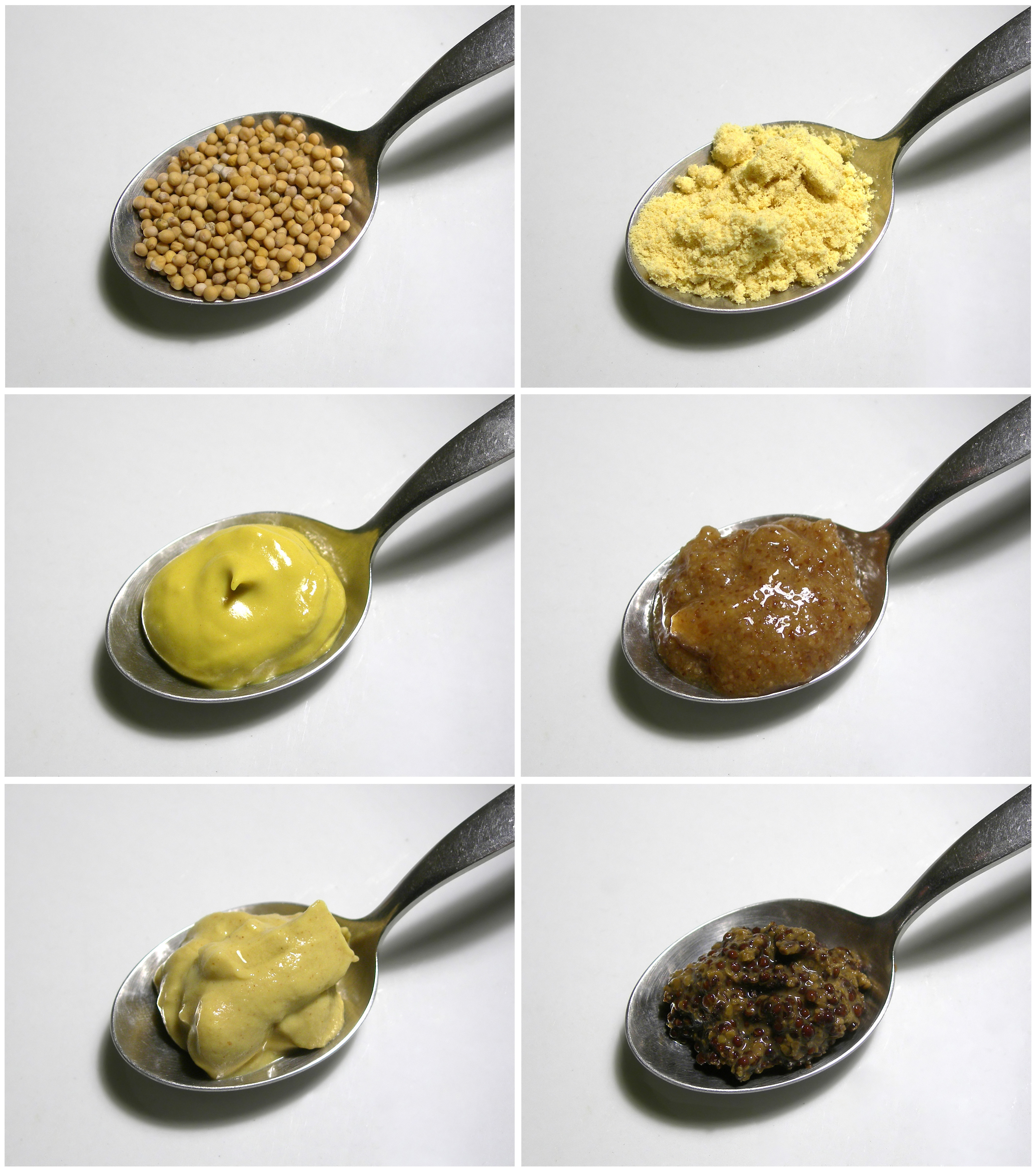
Mustard seeds (top left) may be ground (top right) to make different kinds of mustard. These four mustards are: English mustard with turmeric colouring (centre left), a Bavarian sweet mustard (centre right), a Dijon mustard (lower left), and a coarse French mustard made mainly from black mustard seeds (lower right).

Mustard is a condiment made from the seeds of a mustard plant, which may be the white/yellow mustard (Sinapis alba), brown mustard (Brassica juncea), or black mustard (Rhamphospermum nigrum).

The whole, ground, cracked, or bruised mustard seeds are mixed with water, vinegar, lemon juice, wine, or other liquids, salt, and often other flavourings and spices, to create a paste or sauce ranging in colour from bright yellow to dark brown. The seed itself has a strong, pungent, and somewhat bitter taste. The taste of mustard condiments ranges from sweet to spicy.

Mustard is commonly paired with meats, vegetables, and cheeses, especially as a condiment for sandwiches, hamburgers, and hot dogs. It is also used as an ingredient in many dressings, glazes, sauces, soups, relishes, and marinades. As a paste or as individual seeds, mustard is used as a condiment in the cuisine of India and Bangladesh, the Mediterranean, northern and southeastern Europe, Asia, the Americas, and Africa, making it one of the most popular and widely used spices and condiments in the world.

== Etymology ==
The English word mustard derives from Anglo-Norman mustarde and Old French mostarde (Modern French: moutarde). This comes from Latin mustum ("must"), which was a condiment made by mixing grape must with ground mustard seeds to form a paste. Generally called Senf in German, mustard is also known in northern Germany by the similar word Mostrich. First attested in English in the late 13th century, 'mustard' was used as a surname a century earlier.

== History ==
Evidence of mustard in the archaeological record is scarce since species in the Brassicaceae family do not accumulate silica and therefore do not produce phytoliths.

The earliest evidence of humans using mustard plants as food dates to the Pre-Pottery Neolithic site of Jerf el Ahmar in Syria. Here ground mustard seeds identified as belonging to the genus Sinapis were part of a "seed cake" that has been dated to between 9224 and 8753 BC.

Archaeological excavations in the Indus Valley have revealed that mustard was cultivated there. The Indus Valley Civilization existed until about 1850 BC.

Mustard has been used in Africa and China for thousands of years. Mustard greens have been popularly consumed in China. Yellow mustard paste originated in China during the Zhou dynasty (1046–256 BC), when the mustard seeds were ground and made into paste. It was often used in the royal courts during the Zhou Dynasty to help whet the appetite for the later courses in a meal.

The Romans mixed unfermented grape juice (the must) with ground mustard seeds (called sinapis) to make ‘burning must’, mustum ardens. A recipe for mustard appears in De re coquinaria, the anonymously compiled Roman cookery book from the late fourth or early fifth century: the recipe calls for a mixture of ground mustard, pepper, caraway, lovage, grilled coriander seeds, dill, celery, thyme, oregano, onion, honey, vinegar, fish sauce, and oil, and was intended as a glaze for spit-roasted boar.

In the 10th century the monks of Saint-Germain-des-Prés in Paris began their own production of mustard. The first appearance of mustard-makers on the royal registers in Paris was in 1292. Dijon, France, had become a recognized centre for mustard making by the 13th century. The popularity of mustard in Dijon is evidenced by written accounts of guests consuming 320 litres (70 imp gal) of mustard creme in a single sitting at a gala held by the Duke of Burgundy in 1336. In 1877 one of the most famous Dijon mustard makers, Grey-Poupon, was established as a partnership between Maurice Grey, a mustard-maker with a unique recipe containing white wine, and Auguste Poupon, his financial backer. Their success was aided by the introduction of the first automatic mustard-making machine. In 1937 Dijon mustard was granted an Appellation d'origine contrôlée. Owing to its long tradition of mustard making, Dijon is regarded as the mustard capital of France.

The early use of mustard as a condiment in England is attested from the year 1390 in the book The Forme of Cury, which was written by King Richard II's master cooks. It was prepared in the form of mustard balls—coarse-ground mustard seed combined with flour and cinnamon, moistened, rolled into balls and dried—which were easily stored and combined with vinegar or wine to make mustard paste as needed. The town of Tewkesbury was well known for its high-quality mustard balls, originally made with ground mustard mixed with horseradish and dried for storage, which were then exported to London and other parts of the country, and are even mentioned in William Shakespeare's play King Henry the Fourth, Part II.

The use of mustard as a hot dog condiment is said to have been first seen in the United States at the 1904 St. Louis World's Fair, when the bright-yellow French's mustard was introduced by the R.T. French Company.

== Culinary uses ==
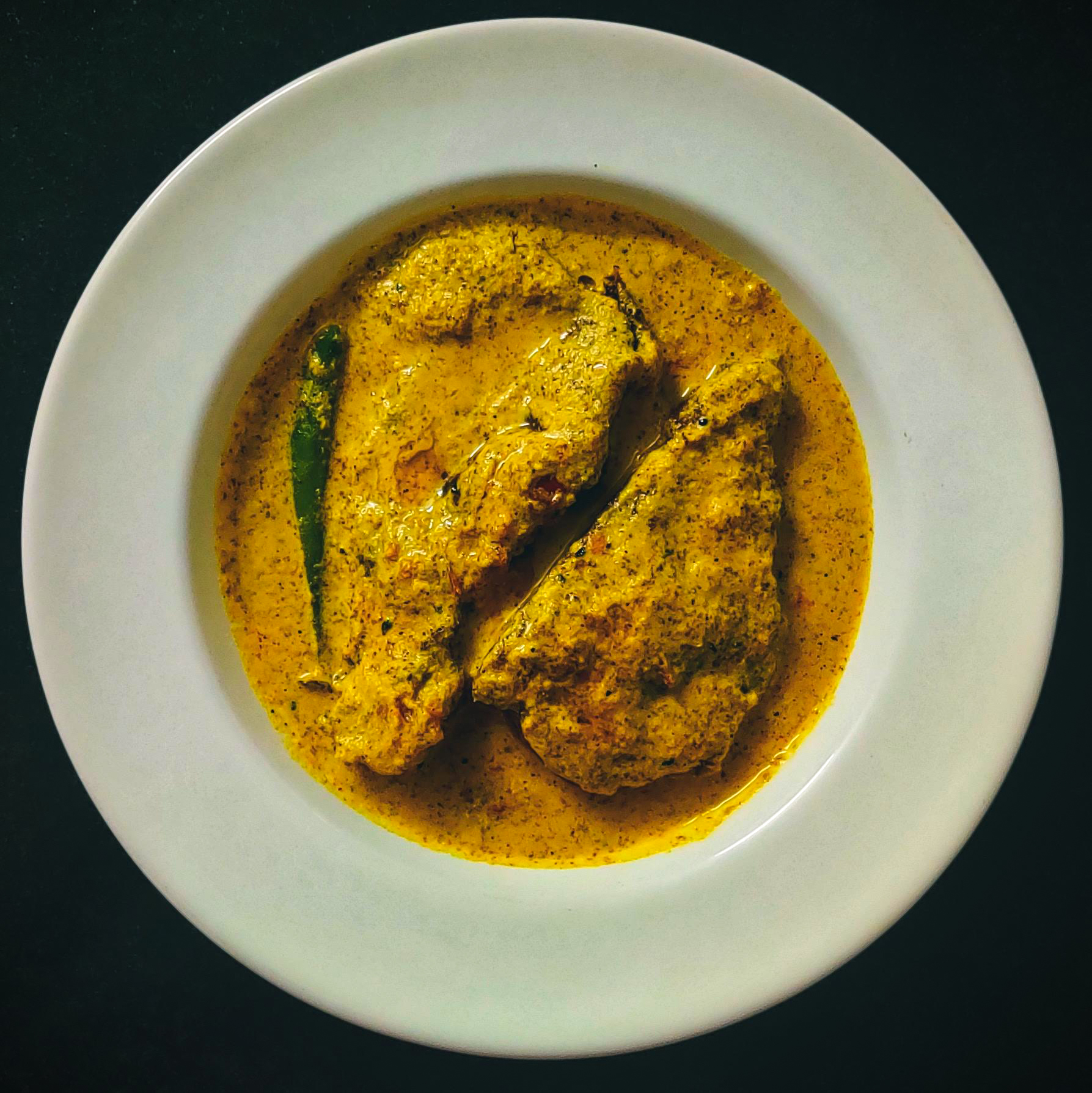
Indian freshwater carp in authentic Bengali mustard gravy

Mustard, yellow
Nutritional value per 100 g (3.5 oz)
- Energy: 276 kJ (66 kcal)
- Carbohydrates: 6 g
- Sugars: 3 g
- Dietary fibre: 3 g
- Fat: 3 g
- Protein: 4 g
Vitamins and minerals
| Minerals | Quantity %DV^{†} |
| Magnesium | 11% 48 mg |
| Potassium | 5% 152 mg |
| Sodium | 49% 1120 mg |
- ^{†}Percentages estimated using US recommendations for adults, except for potassium, which is estimated based on expert recommendation from the National Academies.

Mustard is most often used at the table as a condiment on cold and hot meats. It is also used as an ingredient in mayonnaise, vinaigrette, marinades, and barbecue sauce. It is also a popular accompaniment to hot dogs, pretzels, and bratwurst. In the Netherlands and Belgium, mustard is mainly used as a seasoning of croquettes, bitterballen, and cheese, and commonly used to make mustard soup, which includes mustard, cream, parsley, garlic, and pieces of salted bacon.

Mustard as an emulsifier can stabilize a mixture of two or more immiscible liquids, such as oil and water. Added to Hollandaise sauce, mustard can inhibit curdling.

Mustard can be added to dishes as a primary spice, which is popular in East Indian cuisine. Added to mixed vegetables or fish curries, it can impart a unique flavour to some of the Indian recipes.

=== Nutritional value ===
As a condiment mustard averages about 5 kcal per teaspoon. Some of the many vitamins and nutrients found in mustard seeds are selenium and omega 3 fatty acid.

=== Preparation ===
The many varieties of prepared mustards have a wide range of strengths and flavours, depending on the variety of mustard seed and the preparation method. The basic taste and "heat" of the mustard are determined largely by seed type, preparation, and ingredients. Preparations from the white mustard plant (Sinapis alba) have a less pungent flavour than preparations of black mustard (Brassica nigra) or brown mustard (Brassica juncea). The temperature of the water and concentration of acids, such as vinegar, also determine the strength of a prepared mustard; hotter liquids and stronger acids denature the enzymes that give mustard its strong flavour. Thus, "hot" mustard is made with cold water, whereas using hot water produces a milder condiment, all else being equal.

Mustard oil can be extracted from the chaff and meal of the seed.

Hot table mustard can be prepared at home by mixing ground mustard powder to the desired consistency with water or an acidic liquid such as wine, vinegar, milk or beer, and letting it stand for ten minutes. It is usually prepared immediately before a meal; mustard prepared with water, in particular, is more pungent, but deteriorates rapidly.

=== Flavours ===
The mustard plant itself has a sharp, hot, pungent flavour.

Mixing ground mustard seeds with water causes a chemical reaction between two compounds in the seed: the enzyme myrosinase and various glucosinolates such as sinigrin and sinalbin. The myrosinase enzyme turns the glucosinolates into various isothiocyanate compounds known generally as mustard oil. The concentrations of different glucosinolates in mustard plant varieties, and the different isothiocyanates that are produced, make different flavours and intensities.

- Allyl isothiocyanate and 4-hydroxybenzyl isothiocyanate are responsible for the sharp, hot, pungent sensation in mustards and in horseradish, wasabi, and garlic, because they stimulate the heat- and acidity-sensing TRPV ion channel TRPV1 on nociceptors (pain-sensing nerve cell) in the mouth and nasal passages. The heat of prepared mustard can dissipate with time. This is due to gradual chemical break-up of 4-hydroxybenzyl isothiocyanate.
- Sulforaphane, phenethyl isothiocyanate, and benzyl isothiocyanate create milder and less pungent intensities and flavours as when found in broccoli, brussels sprouts, watercress, and cabbages.
- The sulfoxide unit in sulforaphane is structurally similar to a thiol, which yields onion or garlic-like odours.

Prepared mustard condiment may also have ingredients giving salty, sour (vinegar), and sweet flavours. Turmeric is often added to commercially prepared mustards, mainly to give them a yellow colour.

A strong mustard can make the eyes water, and sting the tongue, palate, and throat. Home-made mustards may be hotter and more intensely flavoured than most commercial preparations.

== Storage and shelf life ==
Prepared mustard is typically sold in glass jars, plastic bottles, or metal squeeze tubes. Because of its antibacterial properties and acidity, mustard does not require refrigeration for safety; it will not grow mould, mildew, or harmful bacteria. Mustard can last indefinitely without becoming inedible or harmful, though it may dry out, lose flavour, or brown from oxidation. Mixing in a small amount of wine or vinegar may improve dried-out mustard. Some types of prepared mustard stored for a long time may separate, which can be corrected by stirring or shaking. If stored unrefrigerated for a long time, mustard can acquire a bitter taste.

When whole mustard seeds are crushed and mixed with a liquid, an enzyme is activated that releases pungent sulfurous compounds, but they quickly evaporate. An acidic liquid, such as wine or vinegar, produces longer-lasting flavour by slowing the reaction. However prepared mustard loses its pungency over time; the loss can be slowed by keeping a sealed container (opaque or in the dark) in a cool place or refrigerator.

== Varieties ==
Mustards come in a wide variety of preparations which vary in the preparation of the mustard seeds and which other ingredients are included. The mustard seed husks may be ground with the seeds, or winnowed away after the initial crushing.

Locations renowned for their mustard include Dijon and Meaux in France; Norwich and (historically) Tewkesbury in England; and Düsseldorf, Bautzen, and Bavaria in Germany.

=== American yellow mustard ===
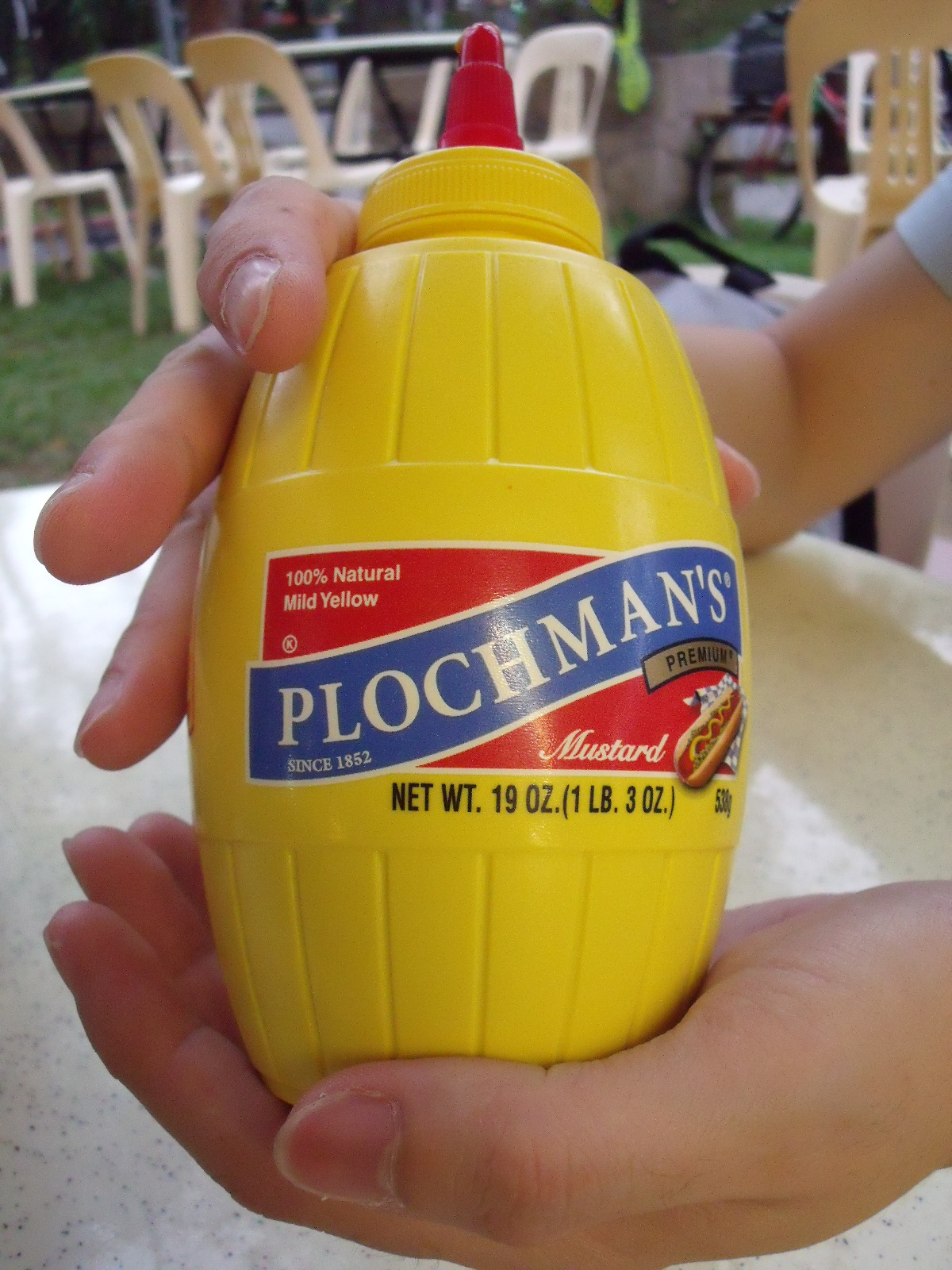
Plochman's mild yellow mustard, with typical bright yellow packaging

The most common mustard in the United States was introduced in 1904 by George J. French as "cream salad mustard". In the US it is usually called "yellow mustard", or sometimes "hot dog" or "ballpark" mustard because of its traditional popularity on hot dogs at baseball games. This variety has become popular in other countries, where it is sometimes referred to as "American mustard".

American yellow mustard is made from the less-piquant yellow mustard seeds, with a high proportion of vinegar. It is a very mild prepared mustard and has a bright yellow colour due to the inclusion of turmeric powder. Yellow mustard is regularly used to top hot dogs, sandwiches, pretzels, and hamburgers. It is also an ingredient in many potato salads, barbecue sauces, and salad dressings.

=== Spicy brown mustard ===
Spicy brown mustard, also known as deli-style mustard, is common in the United States. It includes some coarsely ground brown mustard seeds, giving it a speckled appearance and a spicier flavour than American yellow mustard. Some deli-style mustards also incorporate horseradish for additional heat. A variety popular in Louisiana is called Creole mustard, which is much coarser than most spicy brown types.

=== Dijon mustard ===
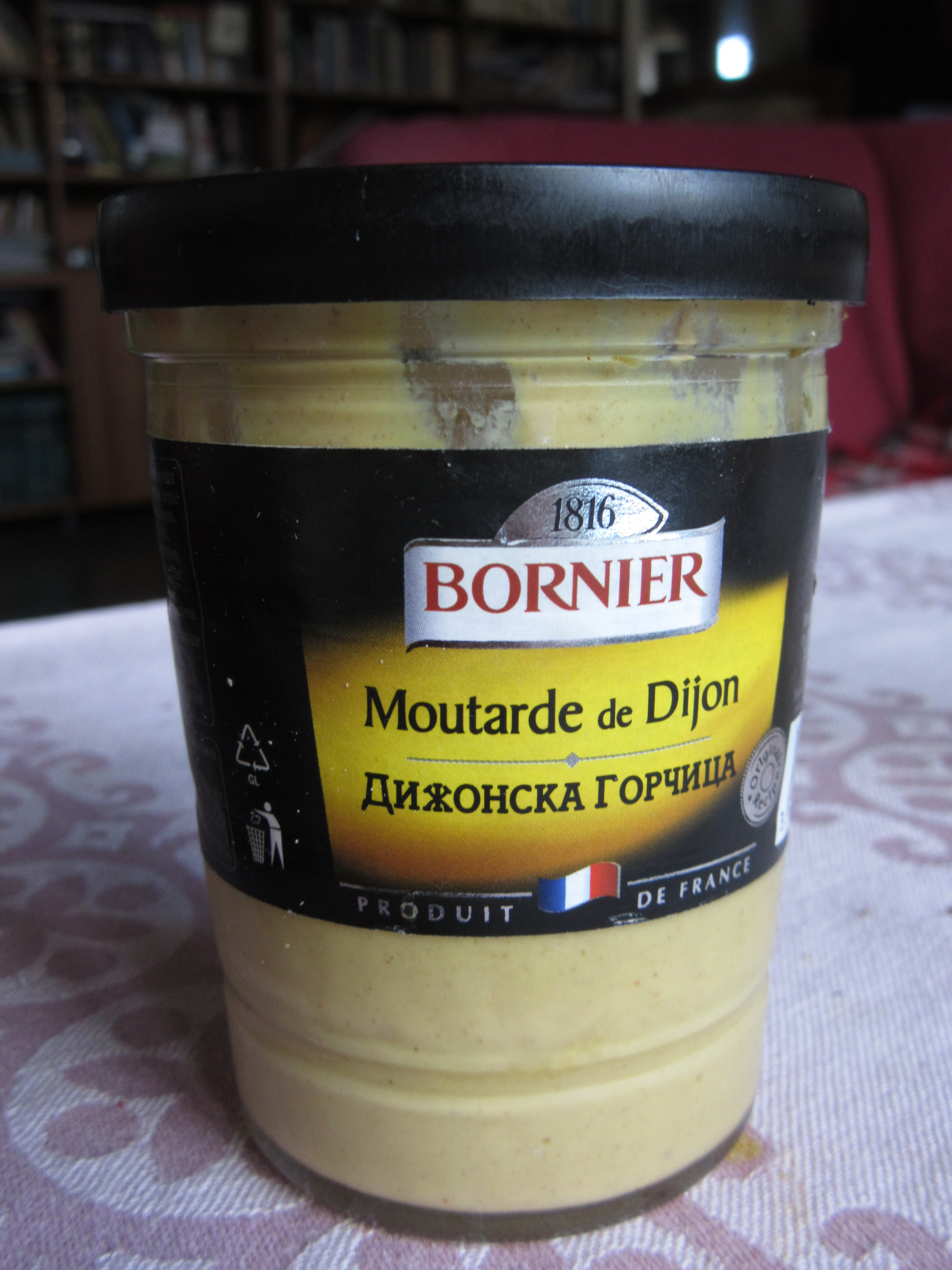
Dijon mustard exported to Bulgaria

Dijon mustard originated in 1856, when Jean Naigeon of Dijon replaced the usual ingredient of vinegar with verjuice, the acidic "green" juice of unripe grapes. Most Dijon mustards today contain white wine rather than verjuice. Dijon mustard is made from brown mustard seeds.

"Dijon mustard" is not a protected food name. While mustard factories still operate in Dijon and adjoining towns, most Dijon mustard is now manufactured elsewhere.

=== English mustard ===
Prepared English mustard is bright yellow with a relatively thick consistency. It is made with a combination of yellow and brown seeds and is stronger than many other mustards as it has a low acid content. It is particularly suited to flavouring as a cooking ingredient but is also used as a table condiment for cold and hot meats. A woman based in Durham by the name of Mrs Clements was the first person to sell English mustard in a prepared format in 1720. The best-selling brand of English mustard is Colman's of Norwich. Colman's began by selling mustard powder in the company's trademark yellow tin, which it introduced in 1814.

=== French mustard ===
French mustard is a dark brown, mild, tangy, and sweet mustard that, despite its name, is not French in origin. French mustard is particular to the UK and was invented by Colman's in 1936. It became a popular accompaniment to steak in particular. Colman's ceased retail production of French mustard in 2001 after Unilever, which now owns Colman's, was ordered to stop selling it by the European Union following its takeover of the rival mustard-maker Amora–Maille in 2000. Many British supermarkets still offer their own version of French mustard.

=== Fruit mustards ===
Fruit and mustard have been combined since the Lombard creation of mostarda di frutta in the 14th century. Large chunks of fruit preserved in a sweet, hot mustard syrup were served with meat and game, and were said to be a favourite of the Dukes of Milan. Traditional variations of fruit mustards include apple mustard (traditional in Mantua and very hot), quince mostarda (or mostarda vicentina, mild and with a jam-like appearance), and cherry mustard. In various areas of Italy, the term mostarda refers to sweet condiments made with fruit, vegetables, and mosto, grape juice that gets simmered until syrupy.

=== Honey mustard ===
Honey mustard is a blend of mustard and honey. It is commonly used both on sandwiches and as a dip for finger foods such as chicken fingers. It can also be combined with vinegar or olive oil to make a salad dressing.

=== Hot mustard ===
The term "hot mustard" is used for mustards prepared to bring out the natural piquancy of the mustard seeds. This is enhanced by using more pungent black or brown mustard seeds rather than yellow mustard seeds, and the low acidity of the liquid used. Karashi is a variety of hot mustard originating in Japan. Hot mustard is also a common condiment in Chinese and Korean cuisine.

=== Hot pepper mustard ===
Chilli peppers of various strengths are used to make a variety of mustards more piquant than plain mustard. Chilis or a hot sauce such as Sriracha made from chilis are added to mustards of different base styles such as yellow mustard, brown mustard, or spirit mustards.

=== Spirit mustards ===
Spirit mustards are made with alcoholic distilled spirits. Variations include Arran mustards with Scotch whisky, brandied peach mustard, cognac mustard, Irish "pub" mustard with Irish whiskey, and Jack Daniel's mustard.

=== Sweet mustard ===
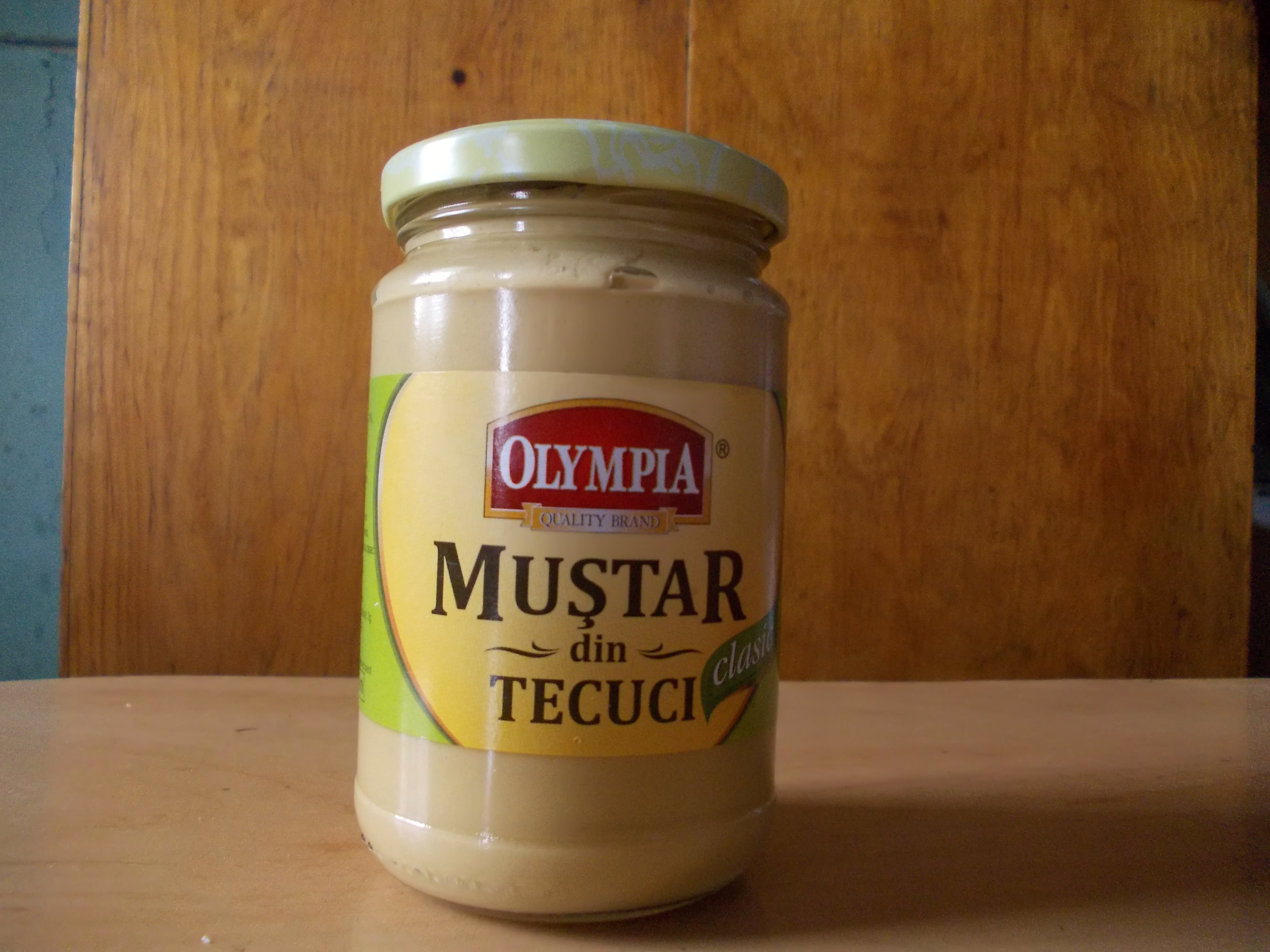
Romanian Tecuci mustard

Sweet mustard is sweetened with sugar. It is common in Bavaria, where it is typically served with Weißwurst or Leberkäse. Moutarde douce is a sweetened mustard usually containing other herbs found in France, though less common than Dijon style. Other types of sweet mustards are known in Austria and Switzerland. Sweet mustard from Tecuci, Romania, is a variety very popular in Southeastern Europe and is suitable for grilled meats such as mititei.

=== Whole-grain mustard ===
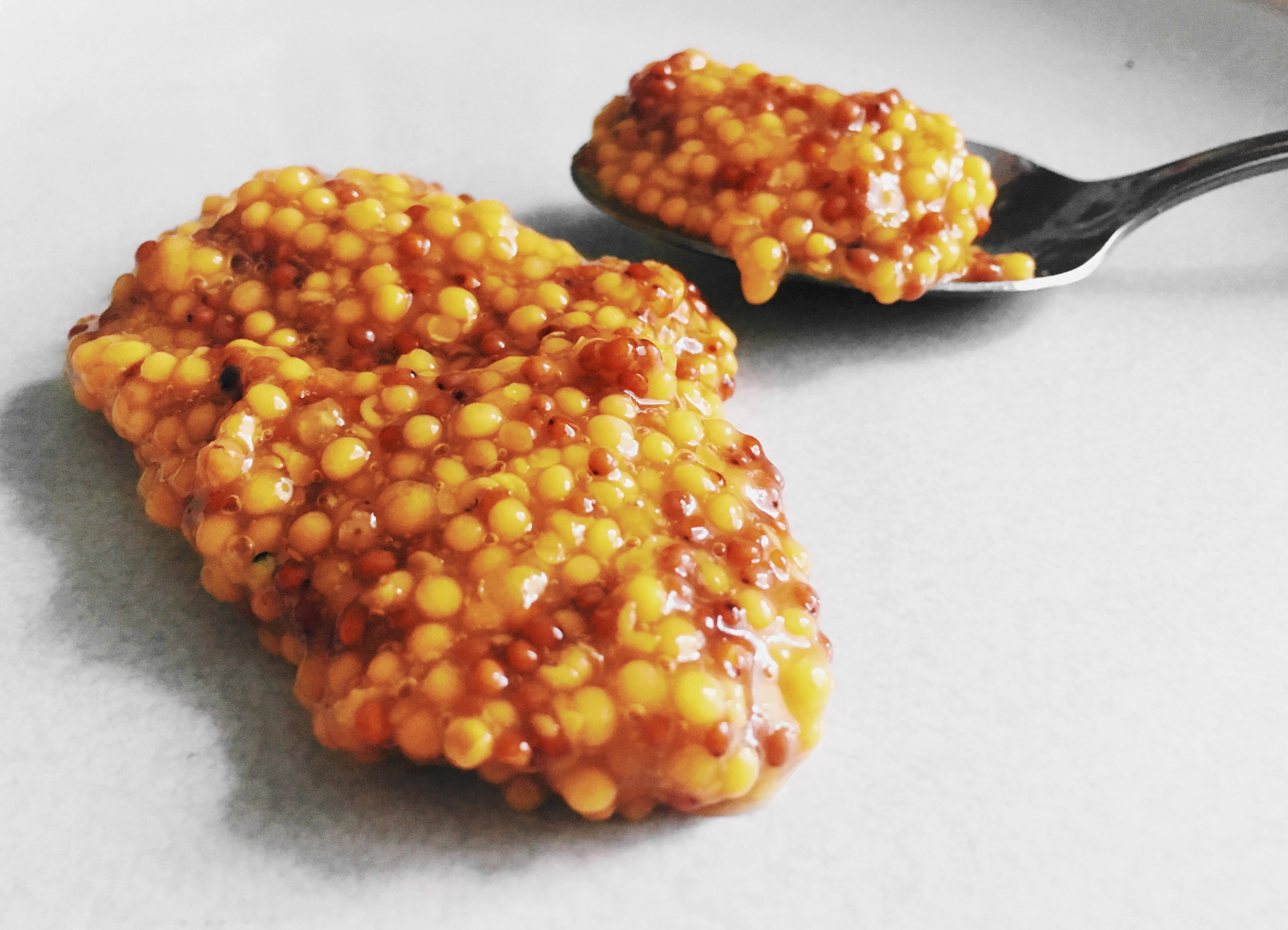
Whole-grain mustard from France

In whole-grain mustard, also known as granary mustard, the seeds are mixed whole with other ingredients. Different flavours and strengths can be achieved through different blends of mustard seed species. Groningen mustard and others are examples of mustards with partially ground grains.

== Allergies ==
Any part of the mustard plant can rarely, cause allergic reactions in some people, including anaphylaxis. In the European Union labelling the presence of mustard in packaged food is compulsory, either as an ingredient or even as unintended contamination in trace amounts. The Regulation (EC) 1169/2011 on food-labelling lists 14 allergens, including mustard, the presence of which in packaged food must be clearly indicated on the label as part of the list of ingredients, using a distinctive typography (i.e. bold, capitals).

== See also ==
- List of mustard brands
- National Mustard Museum
- Ketchup
- Mustard gas

== Bibliography ==
- Antol, Marie Nadine (1999). The Incredible Secrets of Mustard: The Quintessential Guide to the History, Lore, Varieties, and Healthful Benefits of Mustard. Avery Publishing Group.
- Hazen, Janet (1993). Making Your Own Gourmet Mustards. Chronicle Books. ISBN 0-8118-0173-X.
- Sawyer, Helene (1990). Gourmet Mustards: How to Make and Cook with Them. Culinary Arts Ltd. ISBN 0-914667-15-7.
