= Mustard plant =

Flowering plants in the family Brassicaceae used for mustard

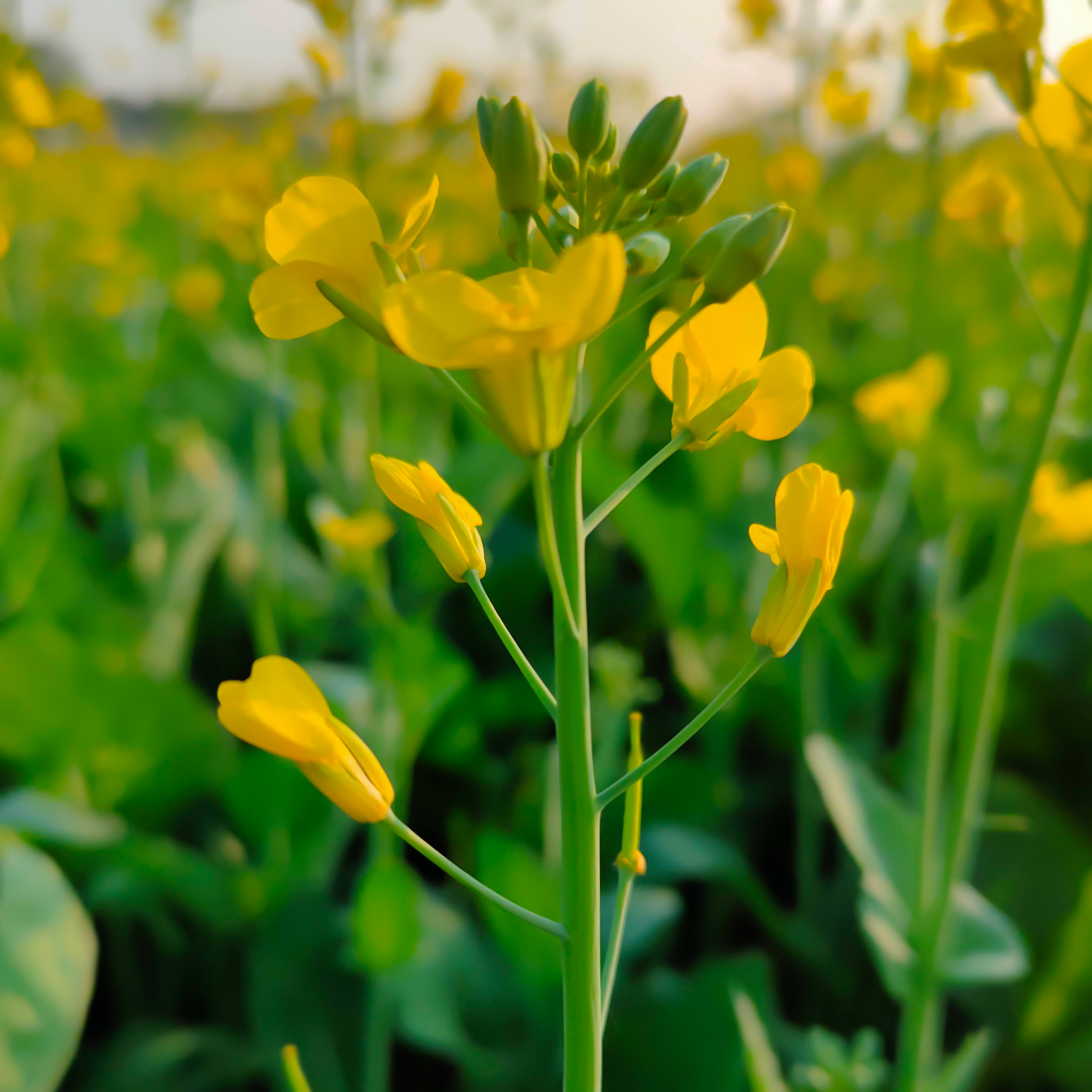
Flower of mustard plant

The mustard plant is any one of several plant species in the genera Brassica, Rhamphospermum and Sinapis in the family Brassicaceae (the mustard family). Mustard seed is used as a spice. Grinding and mixing the seeds with water, vinegar, or other liquids creates the yellow condiment known as prepared mustard. The seeds can also be pressed to make mustard oil, and the edible leaves can be eaten as mustard greens. Many vegetables are cultivated varieties of mustard plants; domestication may have begun 6,000 years ago.

== History ==
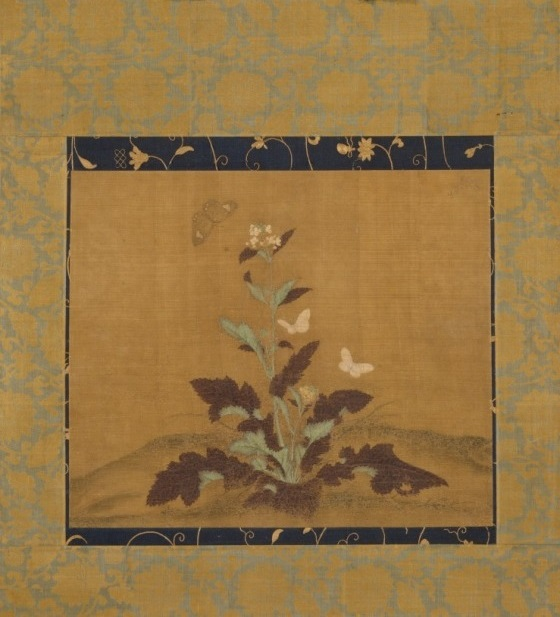
Mustard Plant and Butterflies, early or middle Ming dynasty c. 1368–1550

Although some varieties of mustard plants were well-established crops in Hellenistic and Roman times, archeological records for any of these crops are not reported. Wild forms of mustard and its relatives, the radish and turnip, can be found throughout West Asia and Europe, suggesting their domestication took place somewhere in that area. The Encyclopædia Britannica states that mustard was grown by the Indus Civilization of 2500–1700 BC. According to the Saskatchewan Mustard Development Commission, "Some of the earliest known documentation of mustard's use dates back to Sumerian and Sanskrit texts from 3000 BC".

A 2021 genetic study of B. rapa concluded that the species may have been domesticated as long as 6,000 years ago in Central Asia, and turnips or oilseeds might have been the first product. The results also suggested that a taxonomic re-evaluation of the species might be needed.

Mustard was grown and used as salad greens, a spice (from the seeds), and as forage for domesticated animals in ancient Egypt. Mustard oil may have also been used in some iterations of the embalming practice, as Brassicaceae oils have been found on gazelle mummies. Mustard was also used as a medicinal plant in later Coptic writings, referred by both its Greek name and the Coptic name ϣⲁⲗⲧⲁⲙ (shaltam).

== Species ==
Wild white mustard (Sinapis alba)

White mustard (Sinapis alba) grows wild in North Africa, West Asia, and Mediterranean Europe, and has spread further by long cultivation; brown mustard (Brassica juncea), initially from the foothills of the Himalayas, is grown commercially in India, Canada, the United Kingdom, Denmark, Bangladesh and the United States; black mustard (Rhamphospermum nigrum) is grown in Argentina, Chile, the US, and some European countries. Canada and Nepal are the world's major producers of mustard seed, between them accounting for around 57% of world production in 2010. White mustard is commonly used as a cover crop in Europe (between UK and Ukraine). Many varieties exist, e.g., in Germany and the Netherlands, mostly differing in lateness of flowering and resistance against white beet-cyst nematode (Heterodera schachtii). Farmers prefer late-flowering varieties, which do not produce seeds; they may become weeds in the subsequent year. Early vigor is important to cover the soil quickly and suppress weeds and protect the soil against erosion. In rotations with sugar beets, suppression of the white beet-cyst nematode is an important trait. Resistant white mustard varieties reduce nematode populations by 70–90%.

Mustard species are a common host plant to Phaedon cochleariae, a beetle native to Europe. Due to their particular diet, they have been colloquially referred to as mustard leaf beetles.

Species in another Brassicacea genus, Sisymbrium, are also commonly referred to as mustards, and their seeds and leaves are used for culinary purposes.

== Gallery ==
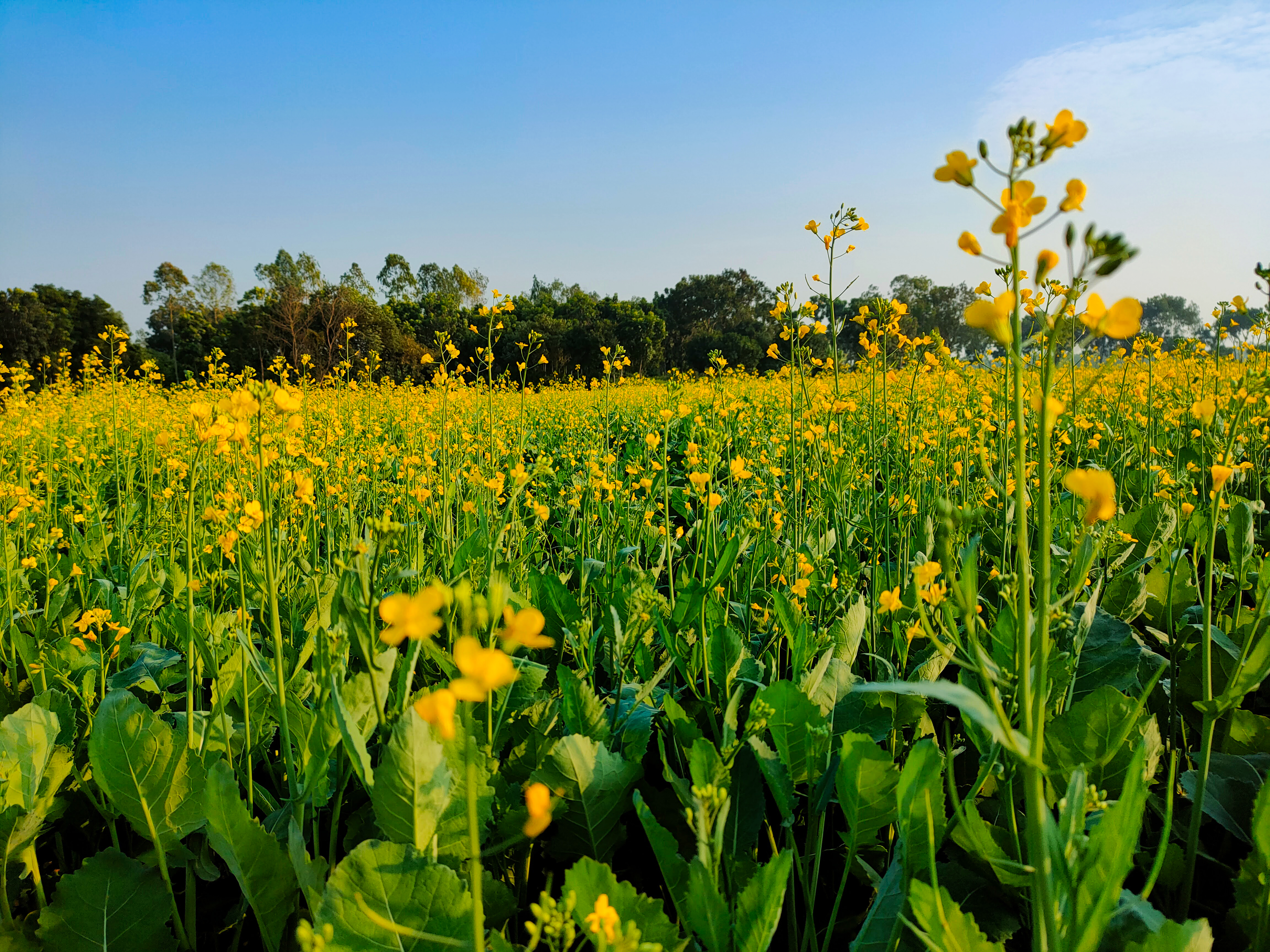
Mustard field

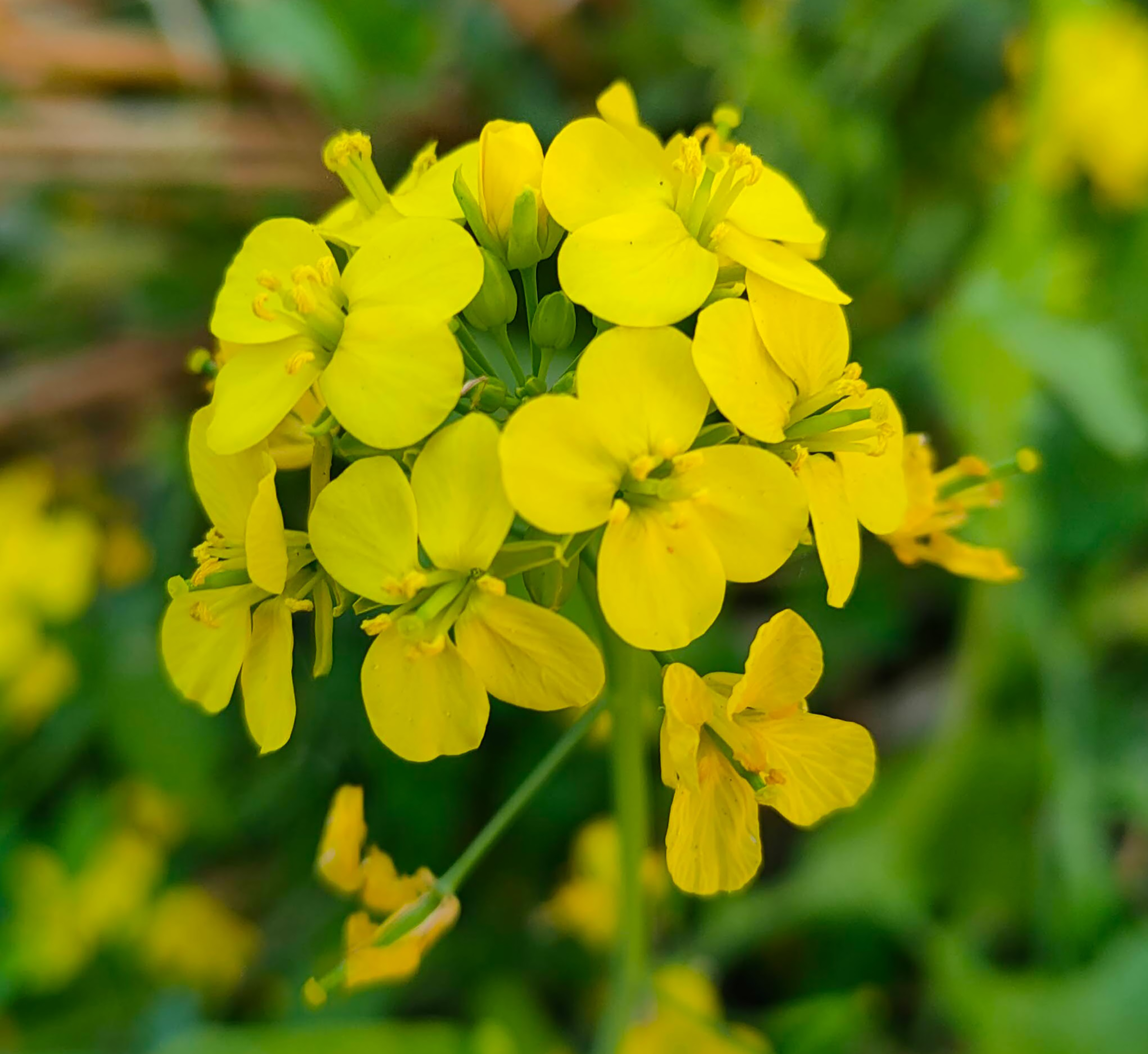
Flower

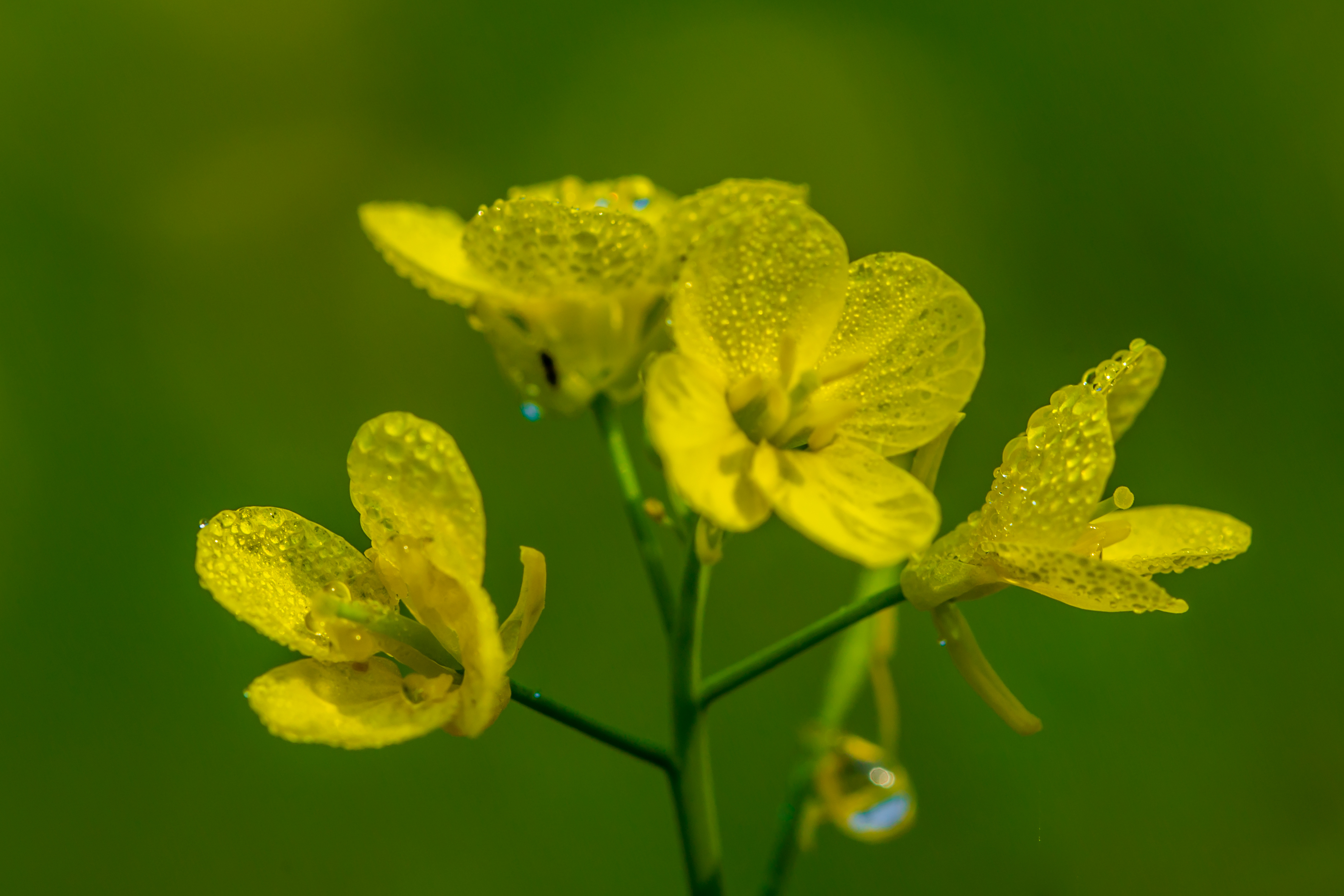
Flower close-up

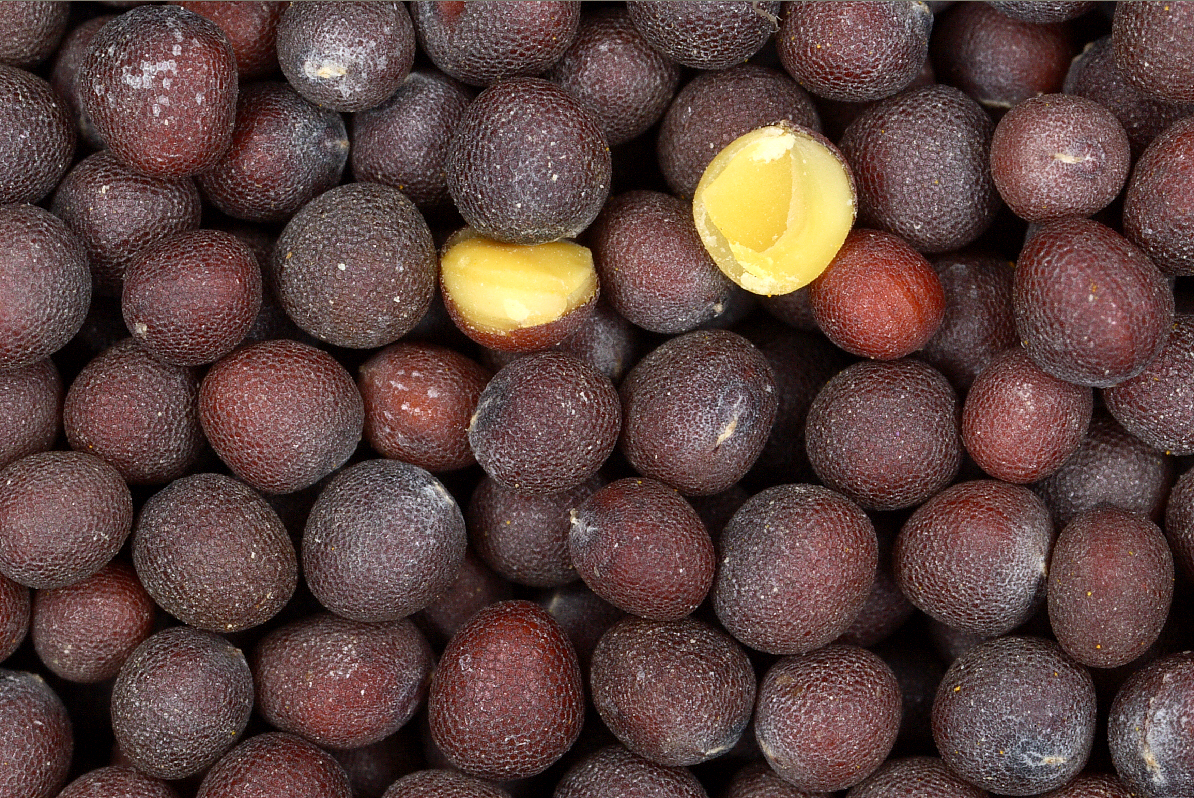
Close-up of black mustard seeds (each about 2–3 mm in diameter)

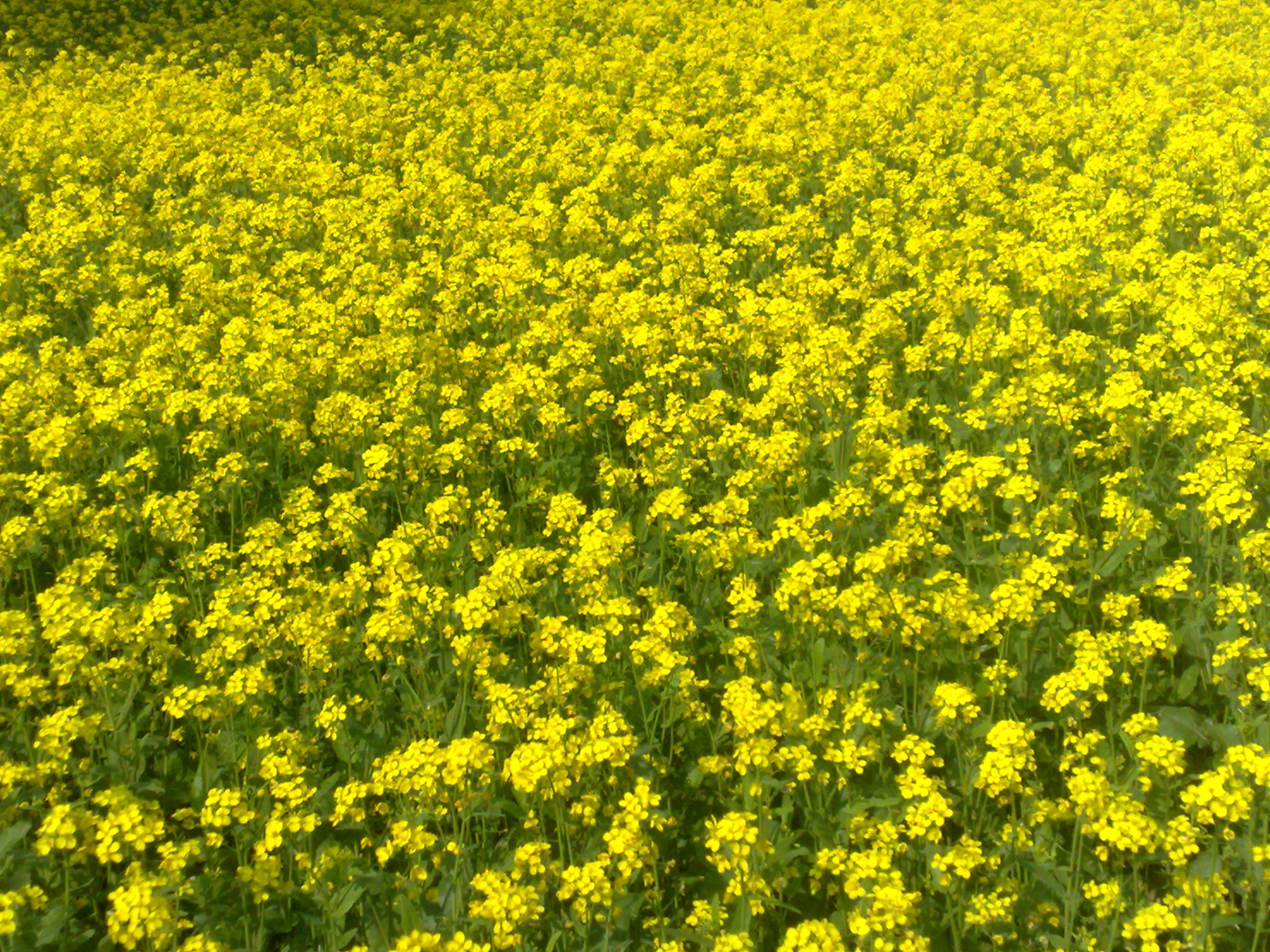
Bangladeshi mustard plants

== See also ==
- Black mustard
- Brown mustard
- Green manure
- Sisymbrium
- List of mustard brands
