= Sinapis turgida =

Sinapis turgida can refer to:

- Sinapis turgida A.Chev., a synonym of Rhamphospermum nigrum (L.) Al-Shehbaz
- Sinapis turgida Pers., a synonym of Rhamphospermum nigrum (L.) Al-Shehbaz
- Sinapis turgida (Pers.) Delile, a synonym of Rhamphospermum arvense (L.) Andrz. ex Besser
