= Steryl-beta-glucosidase =

Class of enzymes

Steryl-β-glucosidase

Identifiers
- EC no.: 3.2.1.104
- CAS no.: 69494-88-8

Databases
- BRENDA: enzyme data
- ExPASy: NiceZyme view
- KEGG: enzyme entry
- MetaCyc: metabolic pathway
- Rhea: reactions
- PDB structures: RCSB PDB PDBe PDBsum
- Gene Ontology: AmiGO / QuickGO
Search
- PMC: articles
- PubMed: articles
- NCBI: proteins

The enzyme steryl-β-glucosidase (EC 3.2.1.104) catalyzes the following chemical reaction:

cholesteryl β-D-glucoside
H_{2}O
cholesterol
+
D-glucose

The enzyme characterised from Sinapis alba hydrolyses cholesteryl β-D-glucoside to cholesterol and D-glucose.

It is a hydrolase, specifically a glycosidase that hydrolyses O- and S-glycosyl compounds. The systematic name is cholesteryl-β-D-glucoside glucohydrolase.
