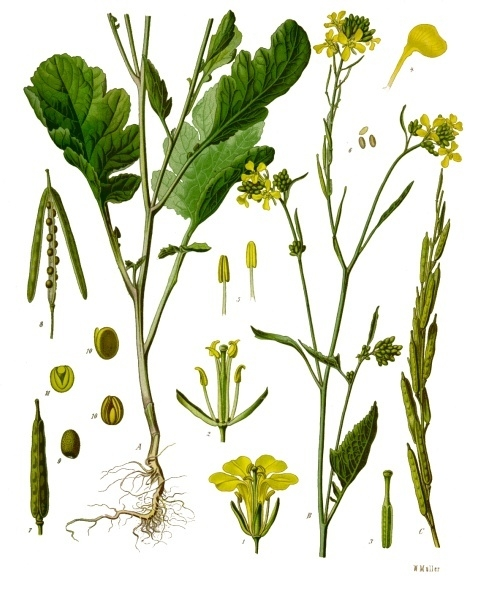
- Mutarda nigra

Scientific classification
- Kingdom: Plantae
- Clade: Tracheophytes
- Clade: Angiosperms
- Clade: Eudicots
- Clade: Rosids
- Order: Brassicales
- Family: Brassicaceae
- Tribe: Brassiceae
- Genus: Mutarda; Bernh.

Synonyms
- Agrosinapis Fourr.; Melanosinapis K.F.Schimp. & Spenn.; Rhamphospermum Andrz.; Sinapistrum Spach

= Mutarda =

Genus of flowering plants

Mutarda is a genus of flowering plants in the family Brassicaceae. It includes four species native to temperate Eurasia, north Africa, Macaronesia, and Ethiopia.

== Species ==
Four species are accepted.

- Mutarda allionii (Jacq.) D.A.German
- Mutarda arvensis (L.) D.A.German
- Mutarda carinata (A.Braun) D.A.German
- Mutarda nigra (L.) Bernh.
