= Mustard seed =

Seeds of various mustard plants

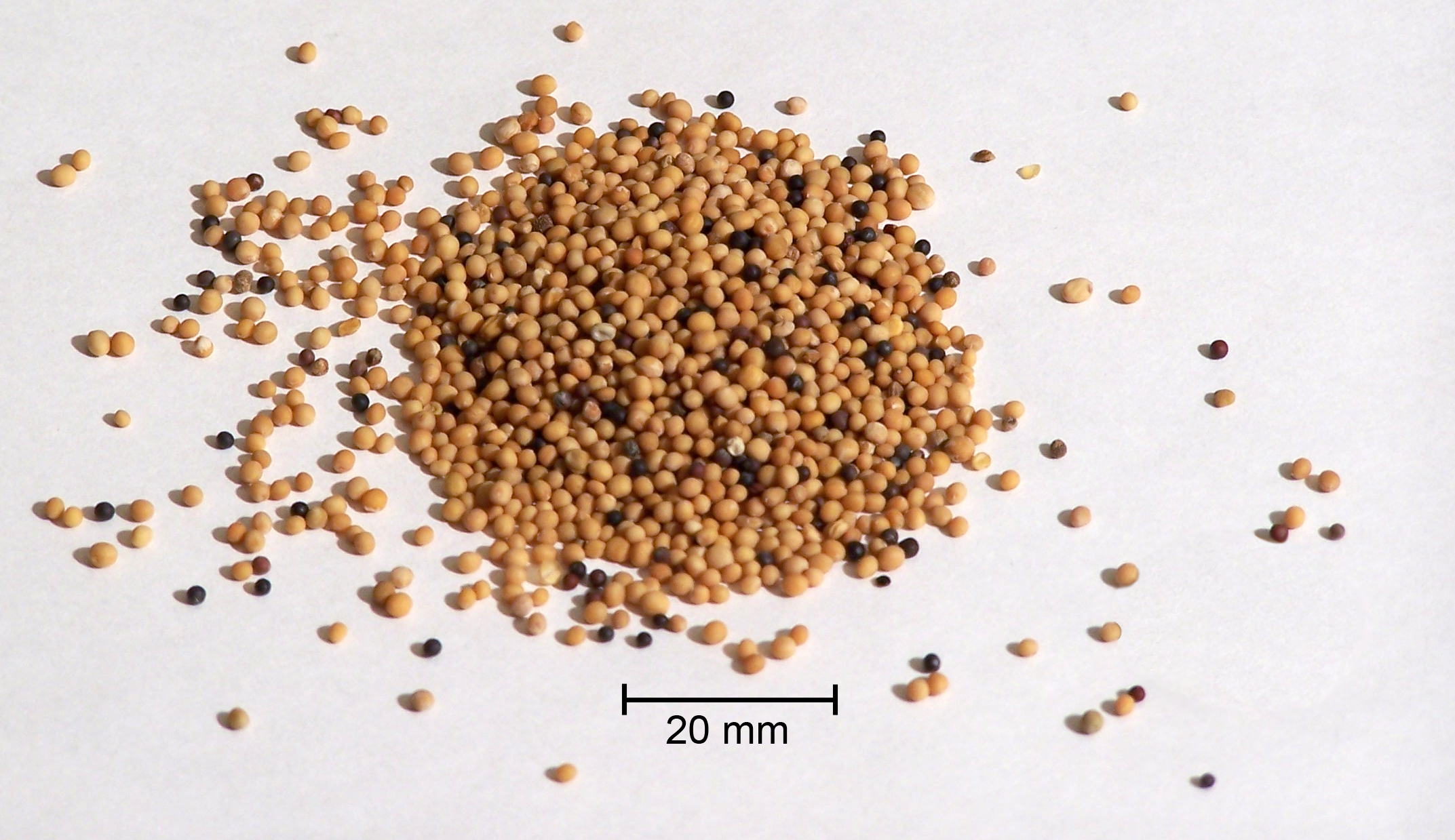
Mustard seeds against a scale of 20 millimeters (3/4 inch)

Mustard seeds are the small round seeds of various mustard plants. The seeds are usually about 1 to 2 millimeters (1/32 to 3/32 in) in diameter and may be colored from yellowish white to black. They are an important spice in many regional foods and may come from one of three different plants: black mustard (Brassica nigra), brown mustard (B. juncea), or white mustard (Sinapis alba).

Grinding and mixing the seeds with water, vinegar or other liquids creates the yellow condiment known as mustard.

== Cultivation ==
Mustard seeds generally take eight to ten days to germinate if placed under the proper conditions, which include a cold atmosphere and relatively moist soil. Mature mustard plants grow into shrubs.

Yellow mustard has a plant maturity of 85 to 90 days; whereas, brown and oriental mustard have a plant maturity of 90 to 95 days. If the temperature conditions are conducive to growth, a mustard plant will begin to bud five weeks after the seedlings have appeared. The plant will reach full bloom 7 to 10 days later. Black, brown or oriental varieties of mustard tend to have higher yields compared to yellow mustard. Seed yield is also related to the bloom period. In other words, the longer the bloom period, the greater the seed yield.

Mustard grows well in temperate regions. Major producers of mustard seeds include India, Pakistan, Canada, Nepal, Hungary, the United Kingdom, and the United States.

In Pakistan, rapeseed-mustard is the second most important source of oil, after cotton. It is cultivated over an area of 307,000 hectares (1190 sq. mi) with an annual production of 233,000 tonnes and contributes about 17% to the domestic production of edible oil.

Mustard seeds are a rich source of oil and protein. The seed has oil as high as 46–48%, and the whole seed meal has 43.6% protein.

=== Production ===
Top 10 mustard seed producers in 2021
Country	Production (tonnes)
Nepal	220,250
Russia	144,593
Canada	60,532
Myanmar	34,146
Ukraine	19,920
United States	19,880
China	19,186
Kazakhstan	8,419
Ethiopia	2,691
Serbia	2,432
World	532,769
All values are FAO estimates. Source: UN Food and Agriculture Organization (FAO)

In 2021, Nepal ranked the highest in mustard seed production, followed by Russia and Canada.

In North America, mustard is produced as a specialty crop. The majority of production is found in the upper Midwest United States and Canada. In 2020, the total production of mustard in the United States was 81.8 million pounds (37.1 kt).

Production of mustard seeds

Mustard seed yield

=== Diseases ===
Mustard seeds carry seed-borne pathogens which affect germination rate, as any other seed. Latif et al., 2006 isolate Alternaria, Aspergillus, Chaetomium, Curvularia, Fusarium, Penicillium, and Rhizopus in Bangladesh.

== Uses ==
Grinding and mixing the seeds with water, vinegar or other liquids creates the yellow-to-brown condiment known as prepared mustard.

Mustard seeds are used as a spice in South Asia. The seeds are usually fried until they pop. The leaves are also stir-fried and eaten as a vegetable. Mustard oil is used for body massage during extreme winters, as it is thought to keep the body warm. In South Asian cuisine mustard oil or shorsher tel is the predominant cooking medium. Mustard seeds are also essential ingredients in spicy fish dishes like jhaal and paturi. A variety of pickles consisting mainly of mangoes, red chili powder, and powdered mustard seed preserved in mustard oil are popular.

In North America, mustard seeds are used in spices and condiments. Yellow mustard is popular in the United States and is often used as a condiment in sandwiches and other dishes. Mustard seeds are first ground into a powder and then mixed with other ingredients to create this condiment. Roughly 1,000 seeds are used in the preparation of 8 ounces of mustard.

=== Other uses ===
Ground mustard seed meal is used as a natural soil amendment for soil-borne disease management in other crops.

== In culture ==
The mustard seed is frequently referenced in world literature, including in religious texts, as a metaphor for something small or insignificant.

In the Bible, specifically the Synoptic Gospels, Jesus tells the Parable of the Mustard Seed referring to faith and the Kingdom of God. There, Jesus says, "The kingdom of heaven is like to a grain of mustard seed, which is the smallest of all seeds on earth. Yet when planted, it grows and becomes the largest of all garden plants, with such big branches that the birds can perch in its shade."

There are references to mustard seeds in India from a story of Gautama Buddha in the fifth century BC. Gautama Buddha told the story of the grieving mother (Kisa Gotami) and the mustard seed. When a mother loses her only son, she takes his body to the Buddha to find a cure. The Buddha asks her to bring a handful of mustard seeds from a family that has never lost a child, husband, parent, or friend. When the mother is unable to find such a house in her village, she realizes death is common to all, and she cannot be selfish in her grief.

Jewish texts compare the knowable universe to the size of a mustard seed to demonstrate the world's insignificance and to teach humility.

The mustard seed is mentioned in the Quran: "And We place the scales of justice for the Day of Resurrection, so no soul will be treated unjustly at all. And if there is [even] the weight of a mustard seed, We will bring it forth. And sufficient are We as accountant (21:47)", and according to the Hadith, Muhammad said that he who has in his heart the weight of a mustard seed of pride would not enter Paradise.

== See also ==
- List of mustard brands
