= 4-Hydroxybenzyl isothiocyanate =

Names
- Preferred IUPAC name 4-(Isothiocyanatomethyl)phenol

Identifiers
CAS Number	2086-86-4
3D model (JSmol)	Interactive image
ChEBI	CHEBI:178135
ChEMBL	ChEMBL3593946
ChemSpider	141134
PubChem CID	160611
UNII	318HJ2034L
CompTox Dashboard (EPA)	DTXSID20174974
- InChI: InChI=1S/C8H7NOS/c10-8-3-1-7(2-4-8)5-9-6-11/h1-4,10H,5H2 Key: ATKWJXUJUNLTFU-UHFFFAOYSA-N
- SMILES: C1=CC(=CC=C1CN=C=S)O

Properties
Chemical formula	C_{8}H_{7}NOS
Molar mass	165.21 g·mol^{−1}
- Except where otherwise noted, data are given for materials in their standard state (at 25 °C [77 °F], 100 kPa). Infobox references

4-Hydroxybenzyl isothiocyanate is a naturally occurring isothiocyanate. It is formed as a degradation product of sinalbin from white mustard and contributes to the pungent taste of mustard seeds.

== Occurrence ==
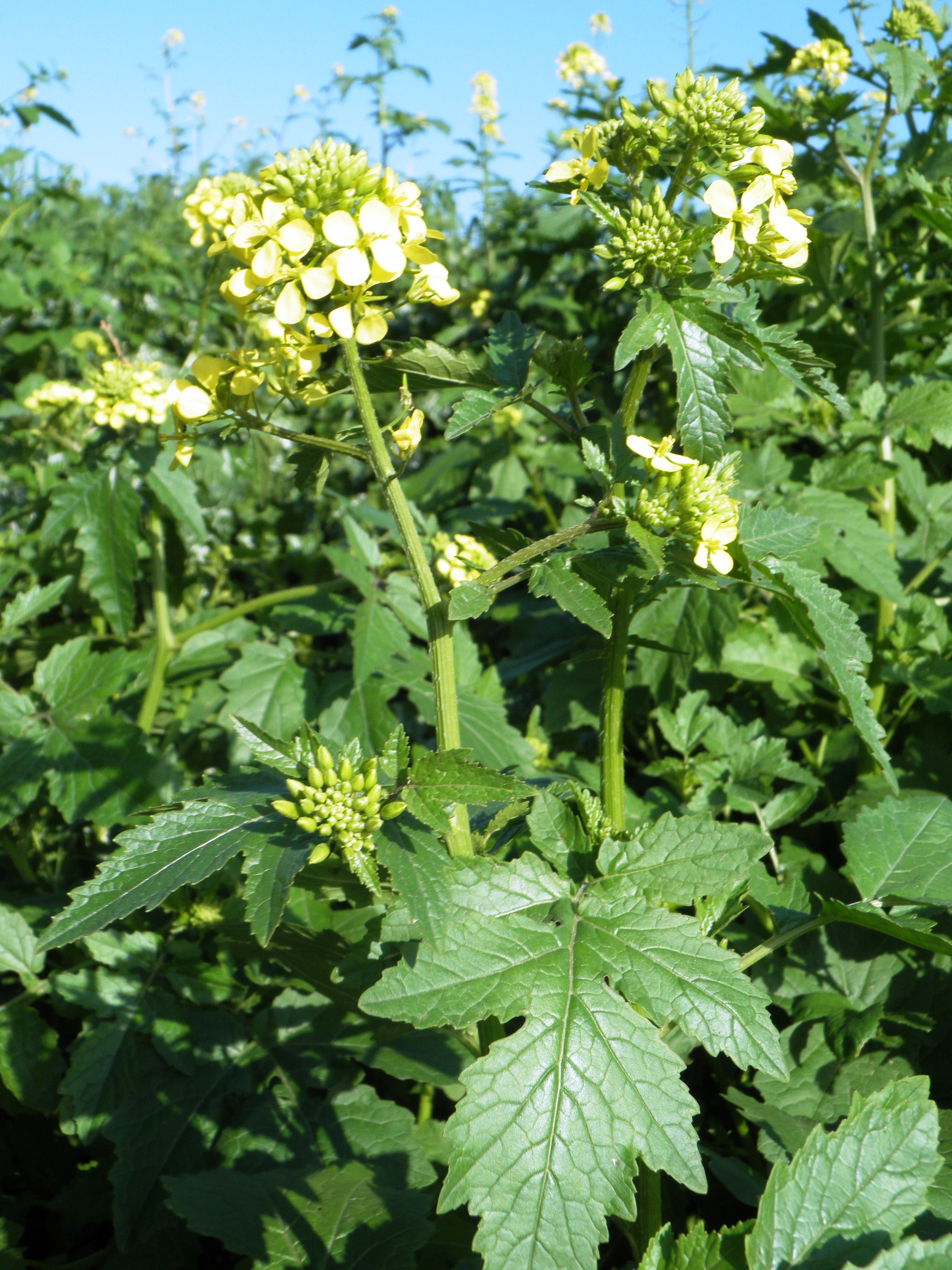
White mustard, Sinapis alba

4-Hydroxybenzyl isothiocyanate occurs as a degradation product of sinalbin or glucosinalbin in white mustard. This compound is broken down as a mustard oil glycoside by myrosinase, releasing the isothiocyanate. The isothiocyanate further decomposes into hydroxybenzyl alcohols with the release of thiocyanates. In the presence of a nitrile-specifier protein, the less toxic 4-hydroxyphenylacetonitrile is formed from the mustard oil glycoside instead. The cabbage butterfly exploits this mechanism to avoid the toxic effects of the isothiocyanate. Similar to other isothiocyanates found in cruciferous vegetables, this compound contributes to the pungent flavor of mustard.

== Production ==
Similar to its natural formation, 4-hydroxybenzyl isothiocyanate can be synthesized by reacting sinalbin with myrosinase.
