= Mustard cake =

Organic fertiliser and feed for domestic animals

Mustard cake is the residue left after extracting the oil from mustard seeds. It is used as plant fertilizer, including fruit, flower and vegetable crops, and in livestock feed.
