= Hydroxybenzyl alcohol =

Hydroxybenzyl alcohol may refer to:

- 2-Hydroxybenzyl alcohol (salicyl alcohol)
- 3-Hydroxybenzyl alcohol
- 4-Hydroxybenzyl alcohol (gastrodigenin)
