= Sinalbin =

Names
- IUPAC name [(2S,3R,4S,5S,6R)-3,4,5-trihydroxy-6-(hydroxymethyl)oxan-2-yl] 2-(4-hydroxyphenyl)-N-sulfooxyethanimidothioate
- Other names Glucosinalbin; 4-Hydroxybenzyl glucosinolate; Glucosinalbate

Identifiers
CAS Number	19253-84-0
3D model (JSmol)	Interactive image
ChemSpider	7875243
ECHA InfoCard	100.039.606
PubChem CID	656568
UNII	MZ3RB28MCY
CompTox Dashboard (EPA)	DTXSID90430594
- InChI: InChI=1S/C14H19NO10S2/c16-6-9-11(18)12(19)13(20)14(24-9)26-10(15-25-27(21,22)23)5-7-1-3-8(17)4-2-7/h1-4,9,11-14,16-20H,5-6H2,(H,21,22,23)/b15-10+/t9-,11-,12+,13-,14+/m1/s1 Key: WWBNBPSEKLOHJU-BXLHIMNRSA-N; InChI=1/C14H19NO10S2/c16-6-9-11(18)12(19)13(20)14(24-9)26-10(15-25-27(21,22)23)5-7-1-3-8(17)4-2-7/h1-4,9,11-14,16-20H,5-6H2,(H,21,22,23)/b15-10+/t9-,11-,12+,13-,14+/m1/s1 Key: WWBNBPSEKLOHJU-BXLHIMNRBZ
- SMILES: O[C@H]1[C@H](O)[C@@H](CO)O[C@@H](S/C(CC2=CC=C(O)C=C2)=N\OS(O)(=O)=O)[C@@H]1O

Properties
Chemical formula	C_{14}H_{19}NO_{10}S_{2}
Molar mass	425.42 g·mol^{−1}
- Except where otherwise noted, data are given for materials in their standard state (at 25 °C [77 °F], 100 kPa). verify (what is ?) Infobox references

Sinalbin is a glucosinolate found in the seeds of white mustard, Sinapis alba, and in many wild plant species. In contrast to mustard from black mustard (Brassica nigra) seeds which contain sinigrin, mustard from white mustard seeds has only a weakly pungent taste.

Sinalbin is metabolised to form the mustard oil 4-hydroxybenzyl isothiocyanate by the enzyme myrosinase. The less sharp taste of white mustard is because 4-hydroxybenzyl isothiocyanate is unstable and degrades to 4-hydroxybenzyl alcohol and a thiocyanate ion, which are not pungent. The half-life of the isothiocyanate depends on the pH of the solution – the longest time is 321 minutes at pH 3, and the shortest is 6 minutes at pH 6.5. Glucobrassicin is a structurally related glucosinolate that likewise yields a non-pungent isothiocyanate due to reaction with water.
