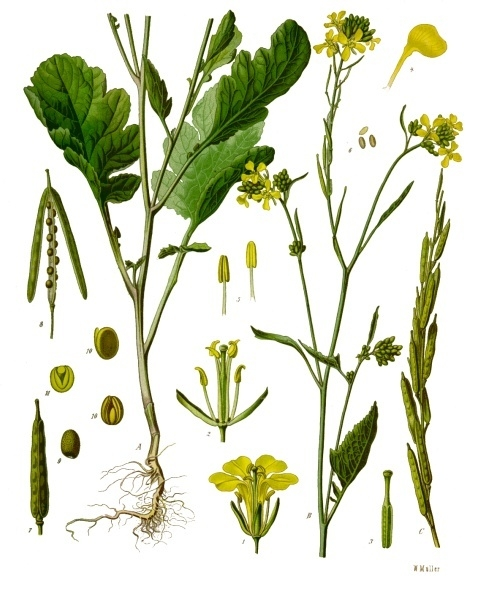

Conservation status
- Least Concern (IUCN 3.1)

Scientific classification
- Kingdom: Plantae
- Clade: Tracheophytes
- Clade: Angiosperms
- Clade: Eudicots
- Clade: Rosids
- Order: Brassicales
- Family: Brassicaceae
- Genus: Rhamphospermum
- Species: R. nigrum

Binomial name
- Rhamphospermum nigrum L. Al-Shehbaz

Synonyms
- List: Brassica brachycarpa P.Candargy; Brassica bracteolata Fisch. & C.A.Mey.; Brassica elongata var. longipedicellata Halácsy ex Formánek; Brassica nigra (L.) W.D.J.Koch; Brassica nigra var. abyssinica A.Braun; Brassica nigra var. bracteolata (Fisch. & C.A.Mey.) Spach ex Coss.; Brassica nigra f. breviflora Zapał.; Brassica nigra var. carneodentata Kuntze; Brassica nigra f. condensata Hausskn.; Brassica nigra f. dentifera Zapał.; Brassica nigra f. glabrata Zapał.; Brassica nigra f. hispida O.E.Schulz; Brassica nigra subsp. hispida (O.E.Schulz) Gladis; Brassica nigra proles persoonii Rouy & Foucaud; Brassica nigra var. subglabra Kuntze; Brassica nigra var. torulosa (Pers.) Alef.; Brassica nigra proles turgida (Pers.) Rouy & Foucaud; Brassica nigra var. turgida (Pers.) Alef.; Brassica nigra var. vulgaris Alef.; Brassica persoonii Rouy & Foucaud; Brassica sinapioides Roth; Brassica sinapioides Roth ex W.D.J.Koch; Brassica sinapis Noulet; Brassica turgida Rouy & Foucaud; Crucifera sinapis (L.) E.H.L.Krause; Erysimum glabrum C.Presl; Melanosinapis communis Spenn.; Melanosinapis nigra (L.) Calest.; Mutarda nigra (L.) Bernh.; Raphanus sinapis-officinalis Crantz; Sinapis bracteolata G.Don; Sinapis erysimoides Roxb.; Sinapis gorraea Buch.-Ham. ex Wall.; Sinapis nigra L.; Sinapis nigra var. torulosa (Pers.) Mérat; Sinapis nigra var. turgida (Pers.) Mérat; Sinapis orgyalis Willd. ex Ledeb.; Sinapis persoonii (Rouy & Foucaud) A.Chev.; Sinapis torulosa Pers.; Sinapis turgida A.Chev.; Sinapis turgida Pers.; Sisymbrium nigrum (L.) Prantl

= Rhamphospermum nigrum =

Species of flowering plant

Rhamphospermum nigrum (syns. Mutarda nigra, Brassica nigra, and Sinapis nigra), black mustard, is an annual plant native to cooler regions of North Africa, temperate regions of Europe, and parts of Asia. It is cultivated for its dark-brown-to-black seeds, which are commonly used as a spice.

== Description ==
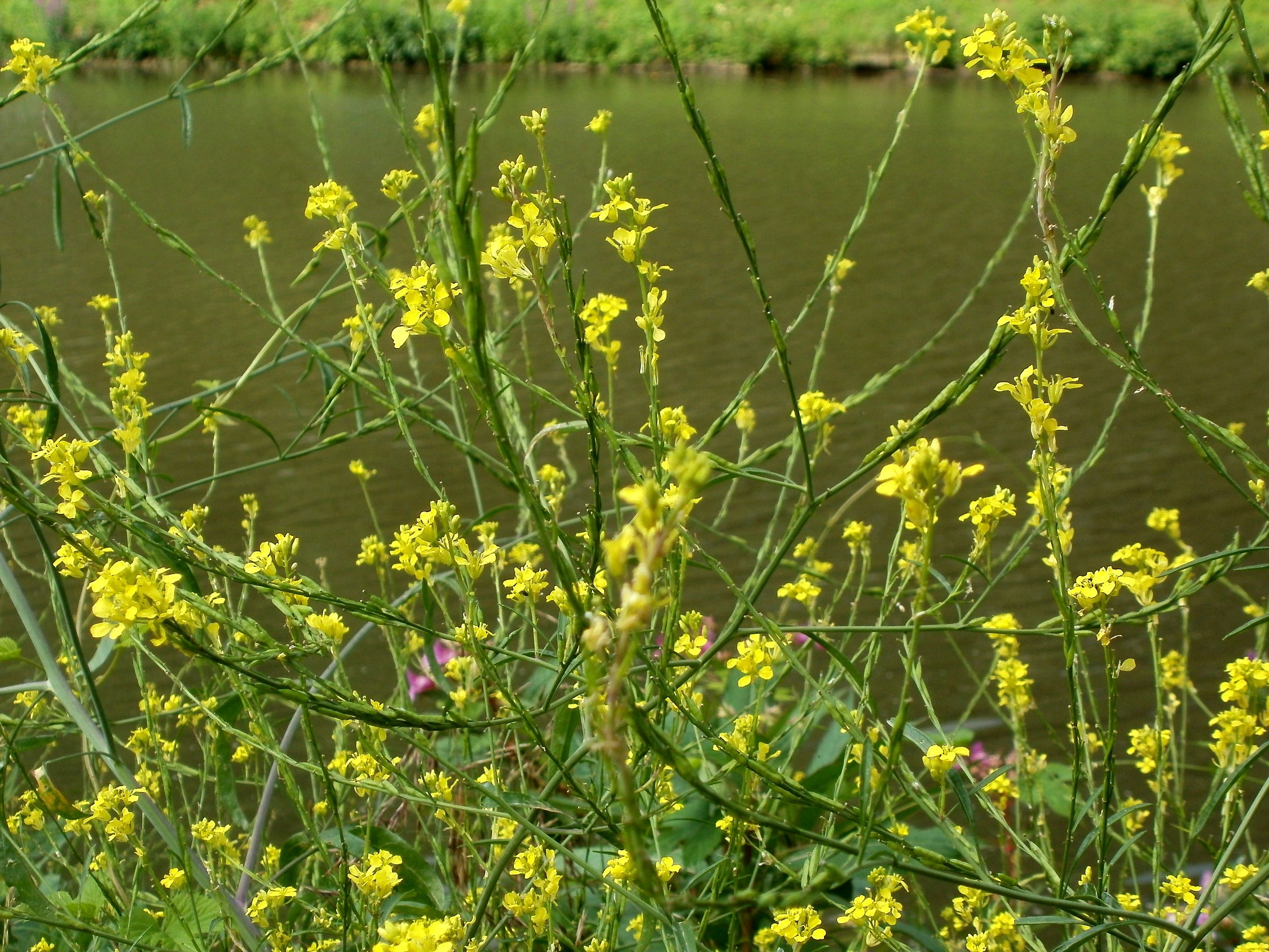
Black mustard plants in Saarbrücken

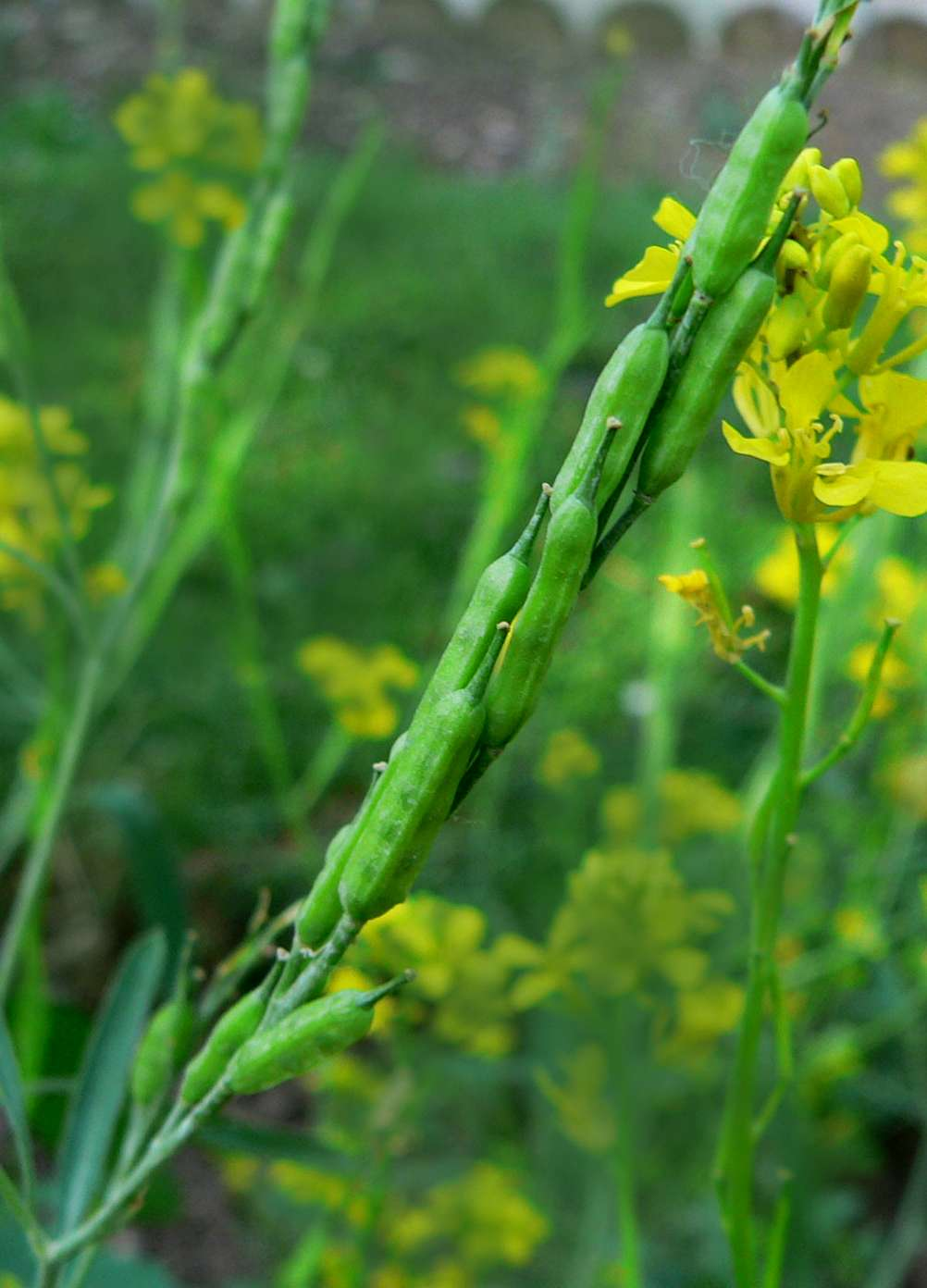
Black mustard fruits at the Jardin des Plantes de Paris

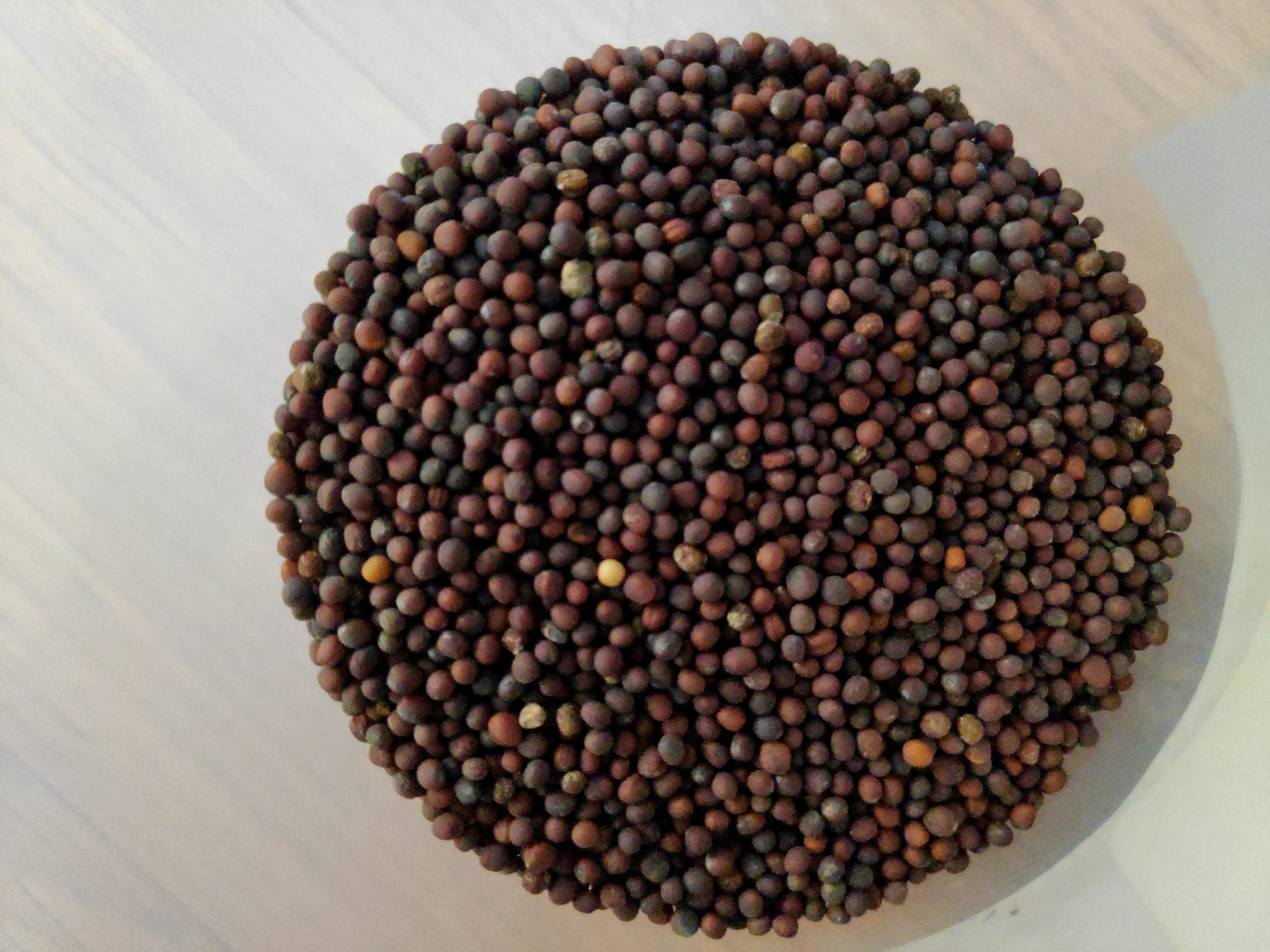
Black mustard seeds

It is an upright plant, growing to 70 centimetres (28 in) in width and up to 1.2 metres (4 ft) tall in moist, fertile soil. The large stalked leaves are covered with hairs or bristles at the base, with smoother stems.

It blooms in summer (from May onwards in the UK). The flowers have four yellow petals, which are twice as long as the sepals. Each stem has around four flowers at the top, forming a ring around the stem. Later, the plant forms long, beaked seed pods, which contain rounded seeds.

=== Similar species ===
Despite their similar common names, black mustard and white mustard (genus Sinapis) are not in the same genus. Black mustard belongs to the same tribe as cabbage and turnips.

R. nigrum also resembles Hirschfeldia incana (hoary mustard, formerly known as Brassica geniculata), a perennial plant.

== Taxonomy ==
It was formally described by Karl Koch in "Deutschl. Fl." (or Deutschlands Flora) ed.3 on page 713 in 1833. This was based on a description by the Swedish botanist Carl Linnaeus.

The Latin-specific epithet nigrum is derived from the Latin word for black. This is due to the black seeds.

== Distribution and habitat ==
It is native to tropical regions of North Africa, temperate regions of Europe and parts of Asia.

In North Africa, it is found within Algeria, Egypt, Eritrea, Libya, Ethiopia, Morocco and Tunisia. Within Asia, it is found in Afghanistan, Armenia, the Caucasus, China (in the provinces of Gansu, Jiangsu, Qinghai, Xinjiang and Xizang), Cyprus, India, Iran, Iraq, Israel–Palestine, Kazakhstan, Lebanon, Syria and Turkey.

In eastern Europe, it is found in Belarus, Moldova and Ukraine. In middle Europe, it is found in Austria, Belgium, Czech Republic, Germany, Hungary, Netherlands, Poland, Slovakia and Switzerland. In northern Europe, in Ireland and the United Kingdom. In southeastern Europe, within Albania, Bosnia and Herzegovina, Bulgaria, Croatia, Greece, Italy, Montenegro, North Macedonia, Romania, Serbia and Slovenia. In southwestern Europe, it is found in France and Spain.

It was introduced to the Pacific coast of North America and is considered an invasive species. The plant was brought here centuries ago by Catholic missionaries during the era of Spanish exploration and colonization, as a food crop, according to Matt Loftis, a manager of Mountain Forestry Department at TreePeople in Los Angeles, California. It has since thrived unchecked, aided by a similar Mediterranean climate in Southern California.

== Uses ==
The plant was used as a condiment more than 2,000 years ago; it was mentioned by the Roman author Columella in the 1st century CE. The plant leaves were also pickled in vinegar. In 13th-century France the seeds were ground and used. They were mixed with unfermented grape juice (must) to create "moût-ardent" ("burning must"). This became later "moutarde", or mustard in English.

A spice is generally made from ground seeds of the plant, with the seed coats removed. The small (1 mm) seeds are hard and vary in color from dark brown to black. They are flavorful, although they have almost no aroma. The seeds are commonly used in Indian cuisine, for example in curry, where it is known as rai. The seeds are usually thrown into hot oil or ghee, after which they pop, releasing a characteristic nutty flavor. The seeds have a significant amount of fatty oil, mainly oleic acid. This oil is used often as cooking oil in India, where it is called "sarson ka tel".

The young leaves, buds and flowers are edible. In Ethiopia, where the plant is cultivated as a vegetable in Gondar, Harar and Shewa, the shoots and leaves are consumed cooked and the seeds used as a spice. Its Amharic name is senafitch.

Since the 1950s, black mustard has become less popular as compared to brown mustard, because some cultivars of brown mustard have seeds that can be mechanically harvested in a more efficient manner.

=== Folk medicine ===
In the UK, the plant was used to make "hot mustard baths", which would aid people with colds. Ground seeds of the plant mixed with honey are widely used in eastern Europe as a cough suppressant. In Eastern Canada, the use of mouche de moutarde to treat respiratory infections was popular before the advent of modern medicine. It consisted in mixing ground mustard seeds with flour and water, and creating a cataplasm with the paste. This poultice was put on the chest or the back and left until the person felt a stinging sensation. Mustard poultice could also be used to aid muscular pains.

== In culture ==
Black mustard is thought to be the seed mentioned by Jesus in the Parable of the Mustard Seed.

== See also ==
- Mustard plant
- Mustard seed
- Sinapis
