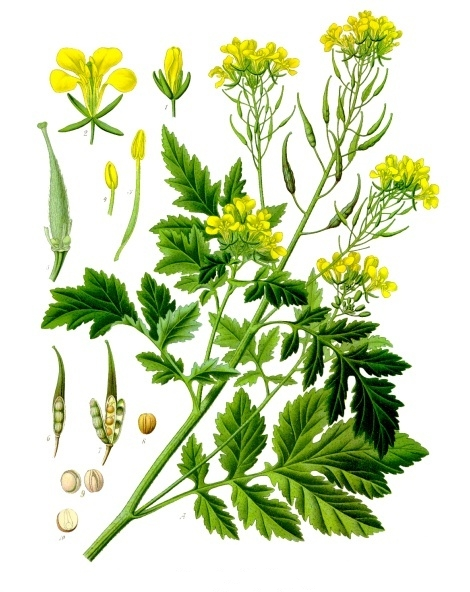

Scientific classification
- Kingdom: Plantae
- Clade: Embryophytes
- Clade: Tracheophytes
- Clade: Angiosperms
- Clade: Eudicots
- Clade: Rosids
- Order: Brassicales
- Family: Brassicaceae
- Genus: Sinapis
- Species: S. alba

Binomial name
- Sinapis alba L.

Subspecies
- S. a. subsp. alba; S. a. subsp. dissecta; S. a. subsp. mairei

Synonyms
- Brassica alba (L.) Rabenh.; Eruca alba (L.) Noulet; Leucosinapis alba (L.) Spach; Raphanus albus (L.) Crantz; Rhamphospermum album (L.) Andrz. ex Rchb.

= White mustard =

Plant species in the cabbage family

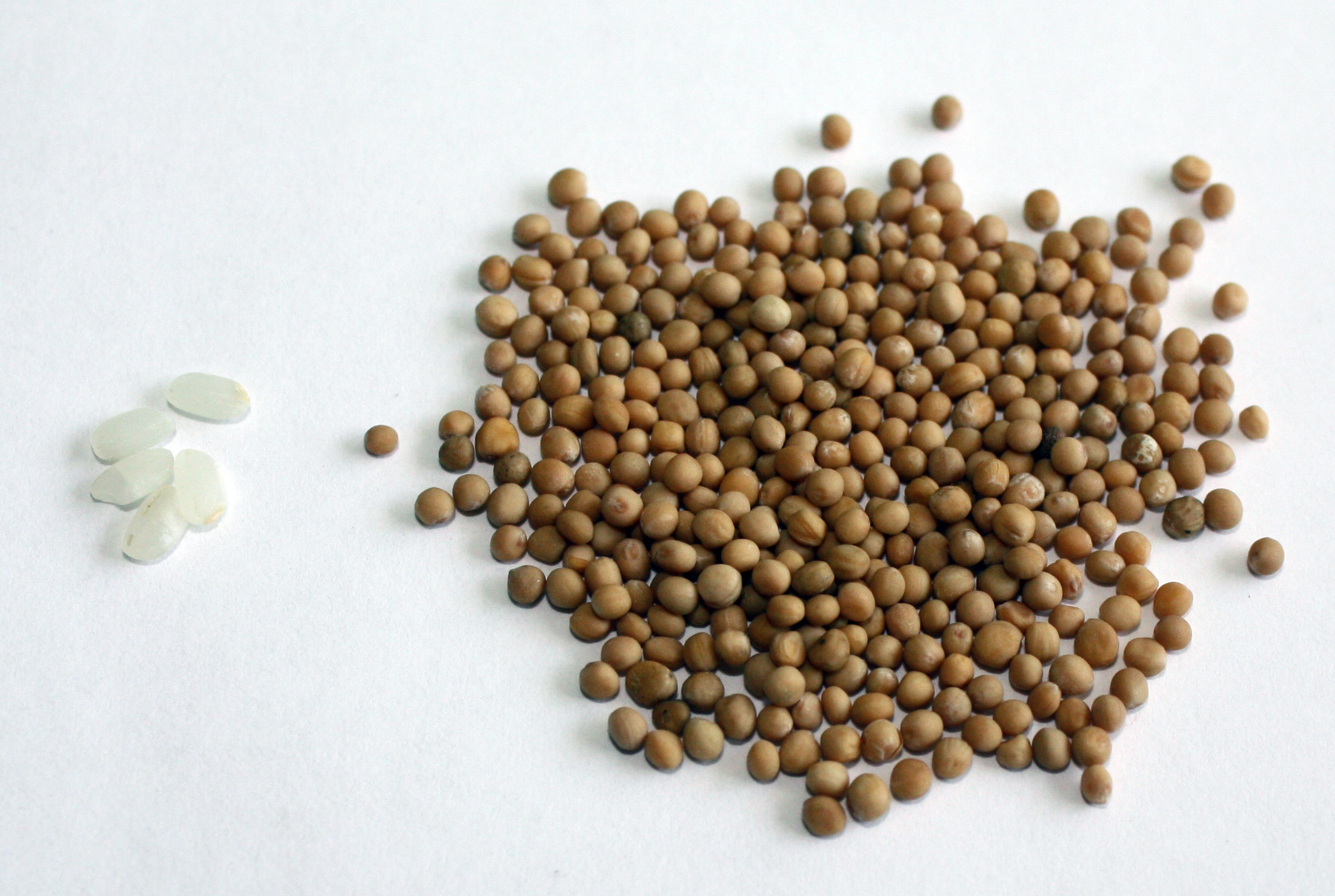
White mustard seeds (right) compared with rice seeds (left)

White mustard (Sinapis alba), also called yellow mustard, is an annual plant of the cabbage family. It is sometimes also referred to as Brassica alba or B. hirta. It is native to the Mediterranean region, Europe and Tropical Asia, but is now widespread worldwide. Grown for its seeds, it is used to make the condiment mustard, as a fodder crop, or as a green manure.

== Description ==
White mustard is an annual, growing to 70 centimetres (28 in) high with stalkless pinnate leaves, similar to Sinapis arvensis. Furthermore it grows relatively fast, faster than other plants in its species such as indian mustard or more commonly known as Brassica junecea The yellow flowers of S. alba contain 4 petals per flower and 4 alternating sepals. In addition, their pods are approximately 2.0–4.2 cm long.

=== Reproduction ===
Sinapis alba is a long day plant, which means they flower when the amount of light received exceeds their critical photoperiod. Pollen from S. alba is able to be dispersed through wind and insect pollinators, such as wild bees, bumblebees, and flower flies. Additionally, white mustard is an obligate outcrossing species, that is, white mustard is self-incompatible and cannot self-fertilize.

== Taxonomy ==
White mustard is one of the species originally described and named by Carl Linnaeus in his 1753 book Species Plantarum using the name Sinapis alba. This name continues to be accepted placing it in genus Sinapis in the family Brassicaceae.

=== Names ===
In English Sinapis alba is known by the common name white mustard, but is also called yellow mustard.

== Distribution ==
Most common in Europe, North Africa, the Middle East and Central Asia, it can be found worldwide. It has been found as far north as Greenland, and naturalized throughout the British Isles.

== Culinary uses ==
Mustard seed, yellow
Nutritional value per 100 g (3.5 oz)
- Energy: 2,126 kJ (508 kcal)
- Carbohydrates: 28.09 g
- Sugars: 6.79 g
- Dietary fiber: 12.2 g
- Fat: 36.24 g
- Saturated: 1.989 g
- Monounsaturated: 22.518 g
- Polyunsaturated: 10.088 g
- Protein: 26.08 g
Vitamins and minerals
Vitamins	Quantity %DV^{†}
Vitamin A equiv.	0% 2 μg
Thiamine (B1)	67% 0.805 mg
Riboflavin (B2)	20% 0.261 mg
Niacin (B3)	30% 4.733 mg
Vitamin B6	23% 0.397 mg
Folate (B9)	41% 162 μg
Vitamin B12	0% 0 μg
Vitamin C	8% 7.1 mg
Vitamin E	34% 5.07 mg
Vitamin K	5% 5.4 μg
Minerals	Quantity %DV^{†}
Calcium	20% 266 mg
Iron	51% 9.21 mg
Magnesium	88% 370 mg
Phosphorus	67% 841 mg
Potassium	28% 828 mg
Sodium	1% 13 mg
Zinc	55% 6.08 mg
- Other constituents: Quantity
- Water: 5.27 g
- ^{†}Percentages estimated using US recommendations for adults, except for potassium, which is estimated based on expert recommendation from the National Academies.

The yellow flowers of the plant produce glabrous or sparsely bristled seed pods. Each fruit (silique) contains roughly a half dozen seeds. The plants are harvested for their seeds just prior to the seed pods becoming ripe and bursting open (dehiscing).

White mustard seeds are hard spheroid seeds, usually around 1.0 to 1.5 mm (0.039 to 0.059 in) in diameter, with a color ranging from beige or yellow to light brown. They can be used whole for pickling or toasted for use in dishes. When ground and mixed with other ingredients, a paste or more standard condiment can be produced. Sinapis alba is used to make the commonplace yellow table mustard, with additional yellow coloring provided by turmeric in some formulations.

The seeds contain sinalbin, which is a thioglycoside responsible for their pungent taste. In S. alba, the glucosinolate sinalbin is broken down by enzymes like myrosinase, resulting in the formation of 'white principles'. These white principles consist of p-hydroxy benzyl isothiocyanate and p-hydroxy benzylamine. White mustard has fewer volatile oils than black mustard seeds, and the flavor is considered to be milder.

In Greece, the plant's leaves are eaten during the winter, before it blooms. Greeks call it vrouves (βρούβα) or lapsana (λαψάνα). In the wine country of California (Napa and Sonoma Counties), the blooming season of this plant (February–March) is celebrated with the Mustard Festival.

== Other uses ==
White mustard is commonly used as a cover and green manure crop in Europe (between the UK and Ukraine).

A large number of varieties exist, mainly differing in lateness of flowering and resistance against white beet-cyst nematode (Heterodera schachtii). Farmers generally prefer late-flowering varieties that do not produce seeds which may develop into weeds in the subsequent year's crop rotation. Early vigor is important to cover the soil quickly to suppress weeds and protect the soil against erosion. In rotations with sugar beets, suppression of the sugar beet nematode (SBCN) is an important trait. Since white mustard is a SBCN-resistant crop, it is able to reduce nematode populations by preventing growth of young nematodes.

Additionally, white mustard can be used in biodiesel production as feedstock and is used as alternative fuel. More applications of white mustard include being used as a binding agent in meat processing, a lubricant for lighting, and in traditional medicine for its antiviral properties.

== Gallery ==
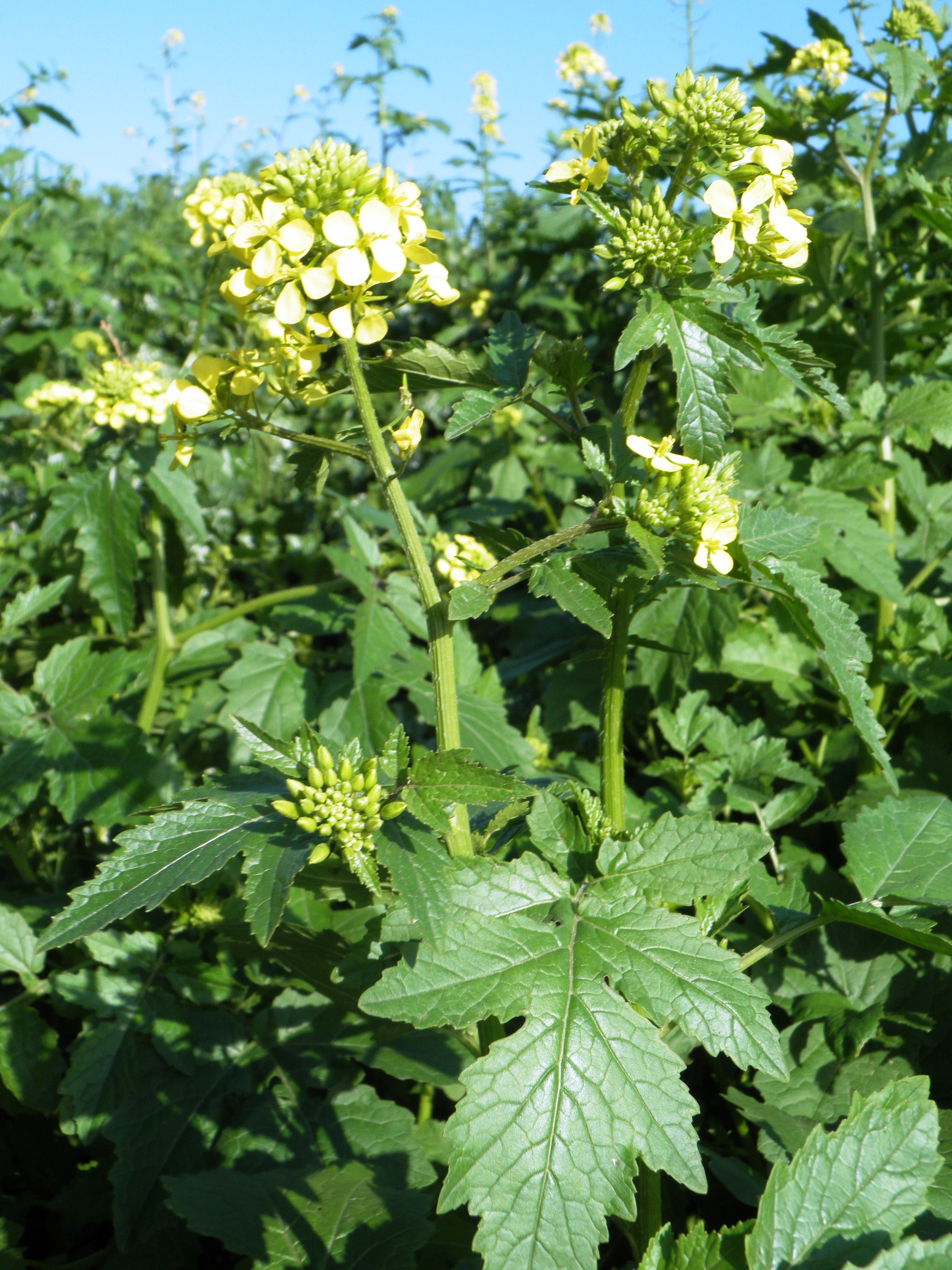
flowering plant

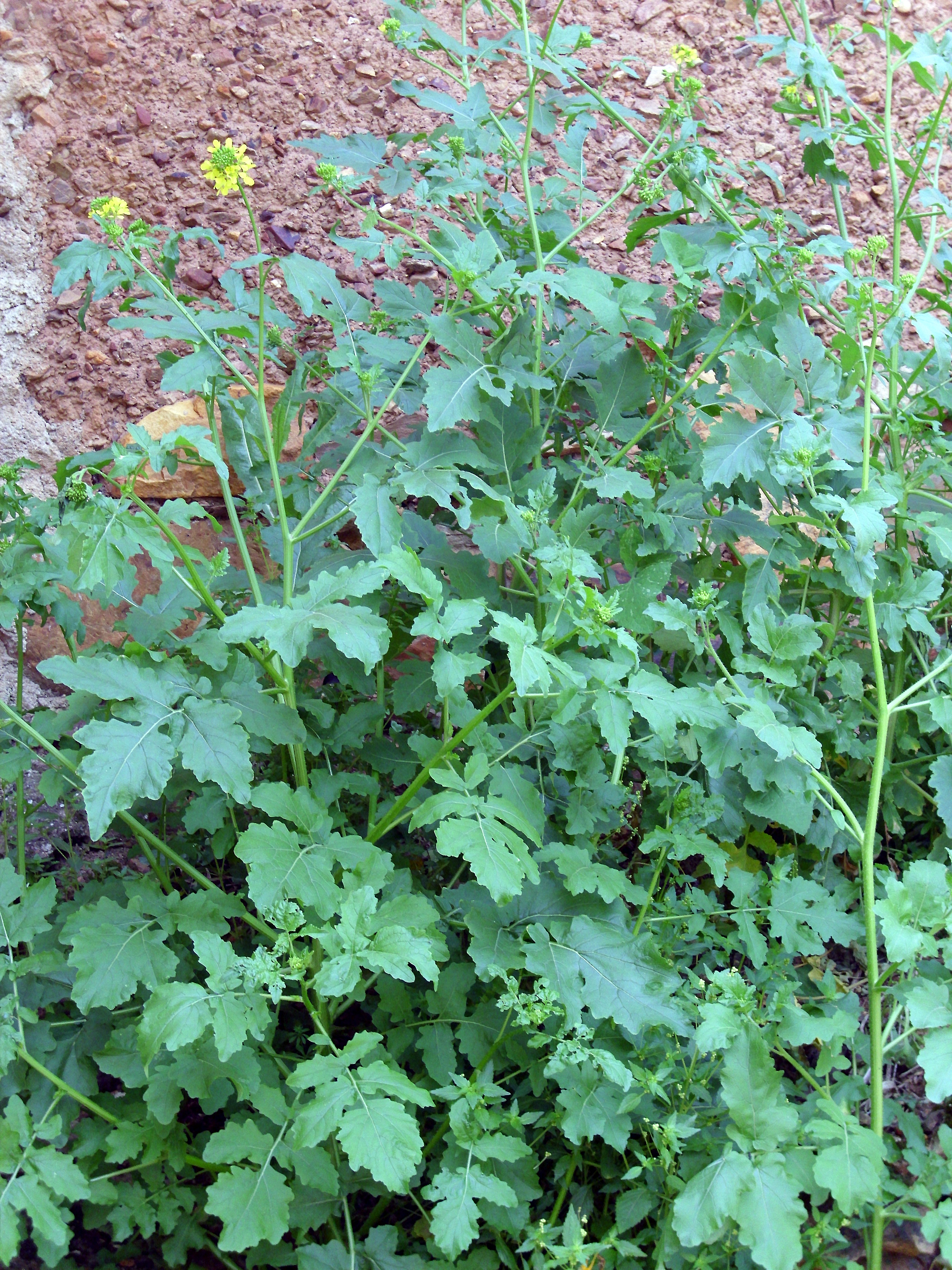
plant

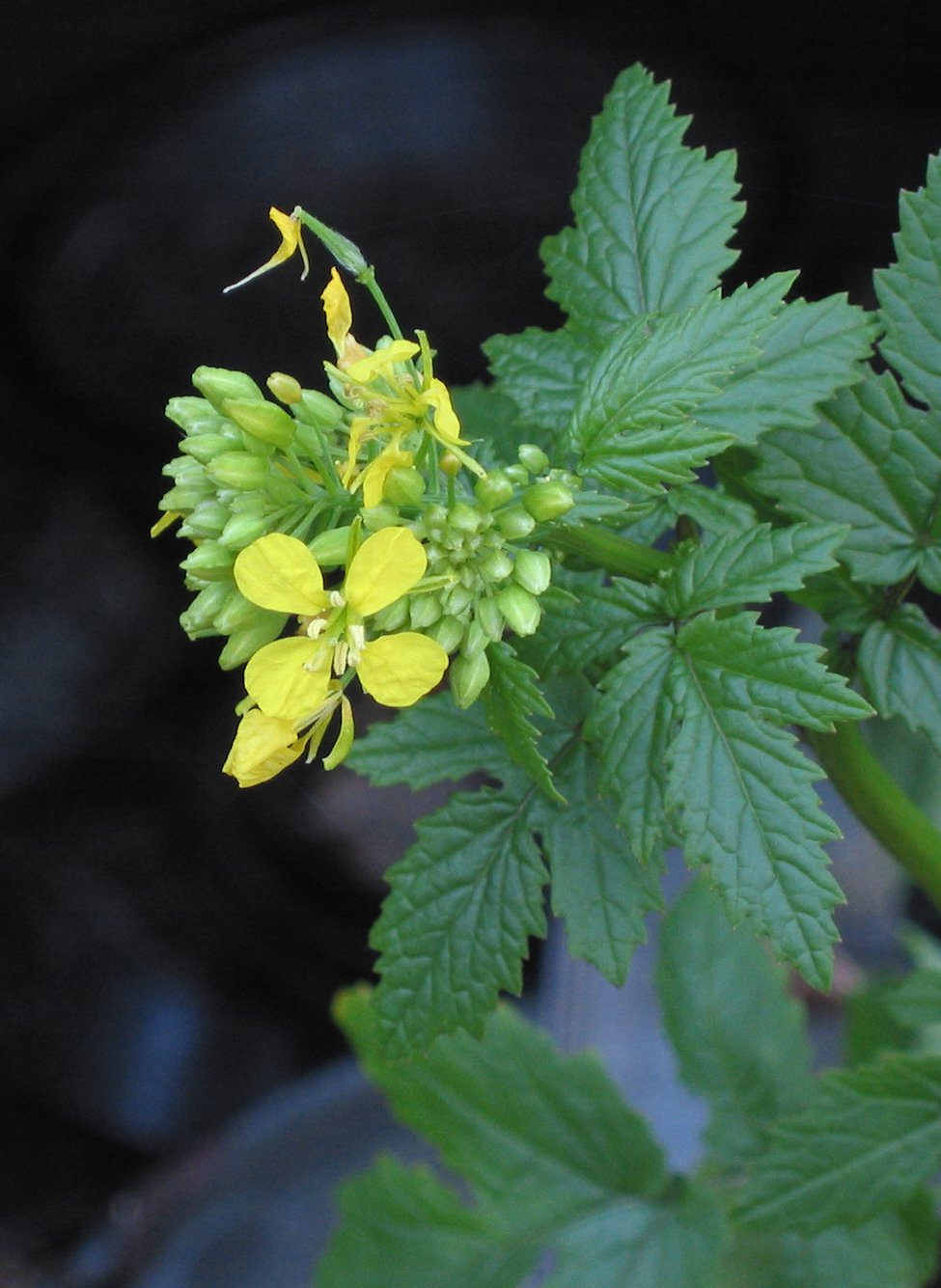
flowers

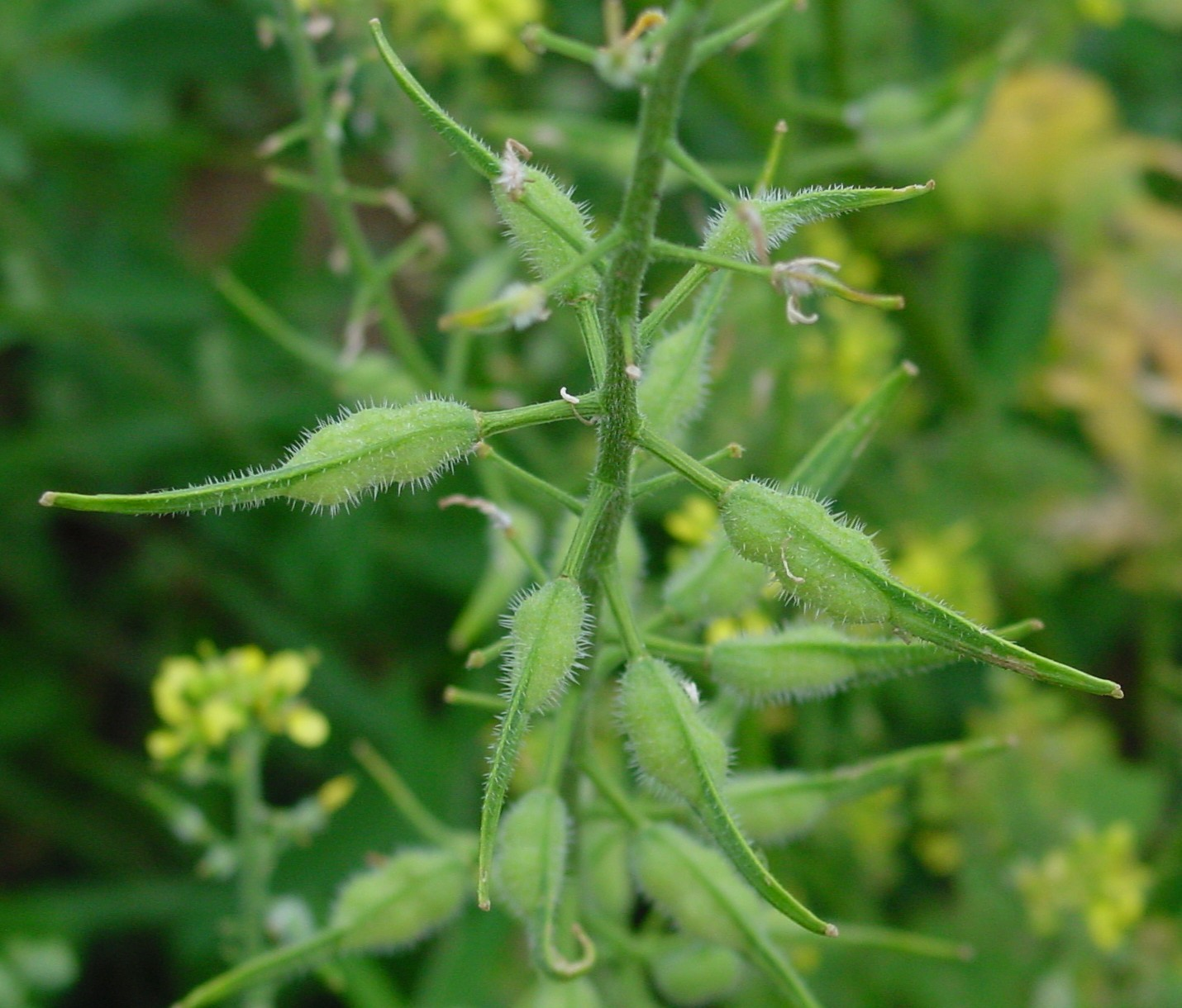
seed pods

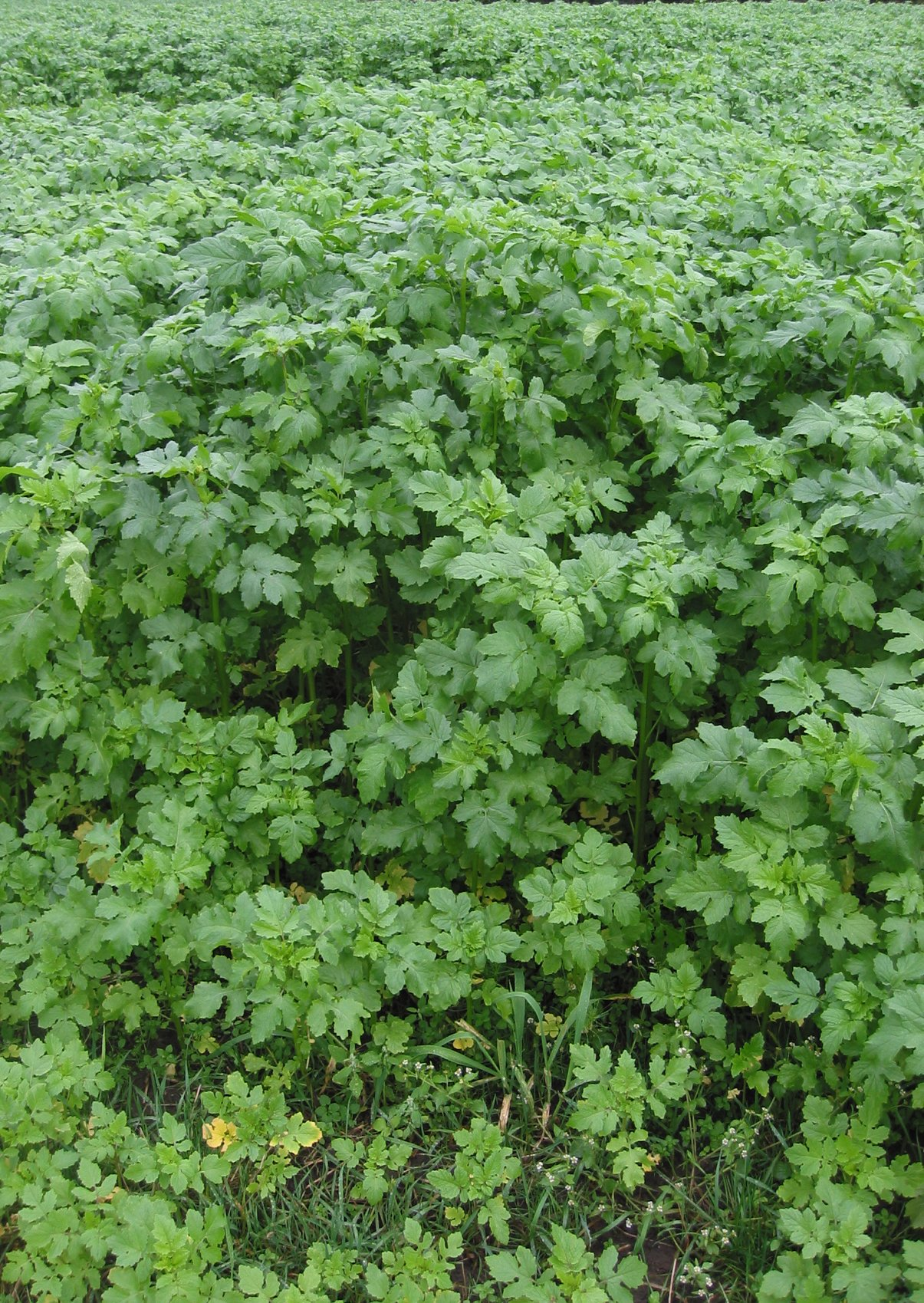
cover crop

== See also ==
- Mustard plant
- Mustard seed
