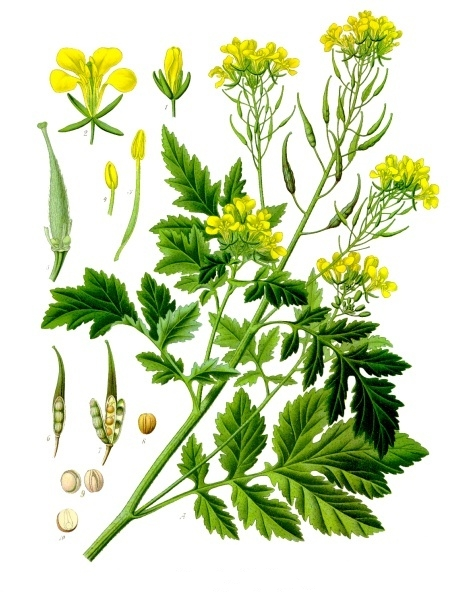
- Sinapis alba

Scientific classification
- Kingdom: Plantae
- Clade: Tracheophytes
- Clade: Angiosperms
- Clade: Eudicots
- Clade: Rosids
- Order: Brassicales
- Family: Brassicaceae
- Genus: Sinapis; L.

Type species
- Sinapis alba L.

Synonyms
- Heterocrambe Coss. & Durieu; Leucosinapis Spach; Sinapi Mill.; Sinapistrum Chevall.

= Sinapis =

Genus of flowering plants

Sinapis is a genus of plants in the family Brassicaceae. As of July 2025, three species are accepted by Plants of the World Online:

- Sinapis alba L. – white mustard, formerly Brassica alba
- Sinapis flexuosa Poir.
- Sinapis pubescens L.
