= Bertman =

Bertman is a surname. Notable people with the surname include:

- Dmitry Bertman (born 1967), Russian theatre and opera director
- Joseph Bertman (1902–1988), Polish-born American business founder
- Louisa Bertman (fl. early 21st century), American illustrator
- Skip Bertman (1938-2026), American baseball player and coach

== See also ==
- Bertman Foods Company
- Bertman Original Ballpark Mustard
