= List of mustard brands =

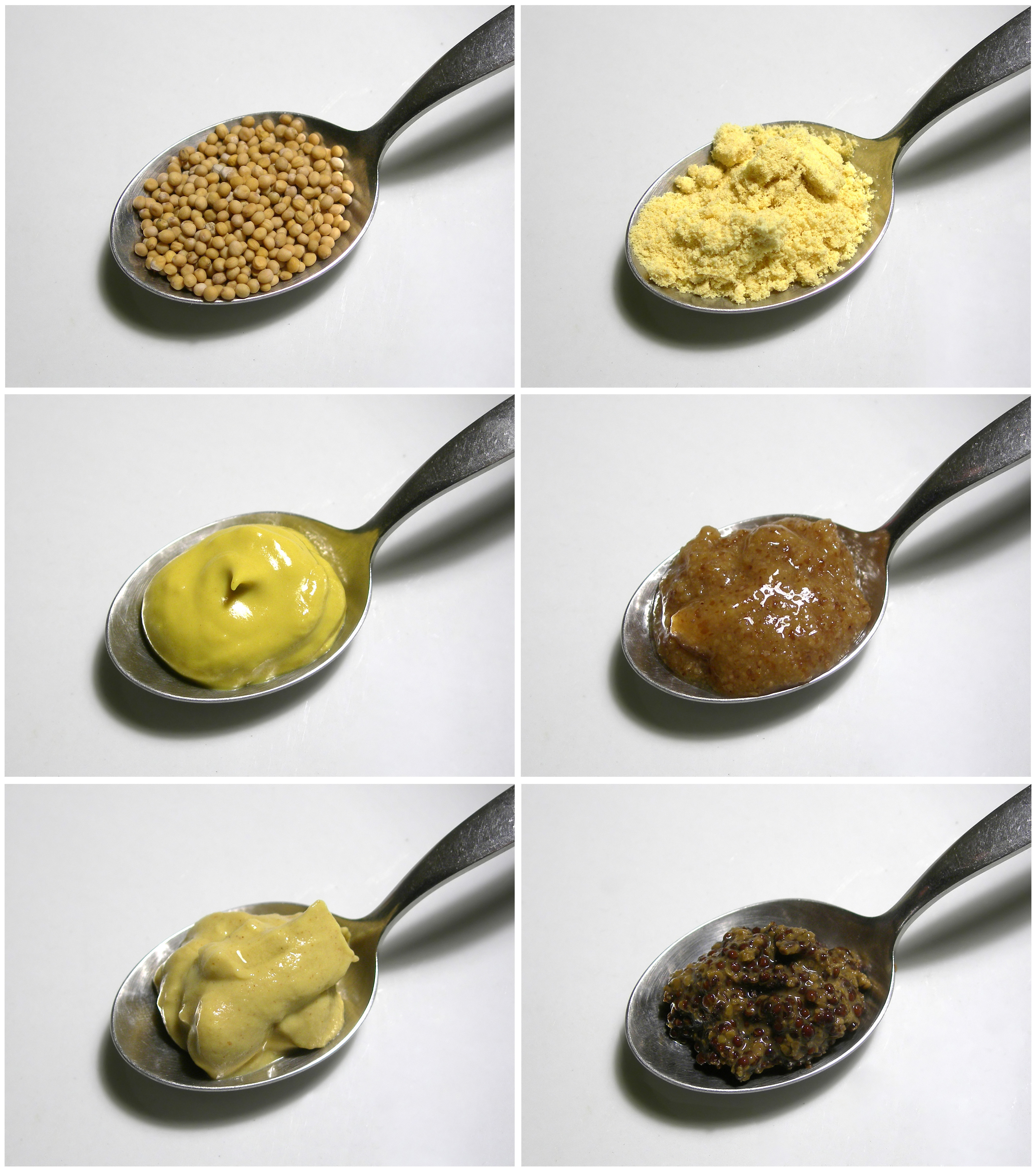
Mustard seeds (top-left) may be ground (top-right) to make different kinds of mustard. The other four mustards pictured are a mild yellow mustard with turmeric coloring (center left), a Bavarian sweet mustard (center right), a Dijon mustard (lower left), and a coarse French mustard made mainly from black mustard seeds (lower right).

Mustard is a condiment made from the mustard seeds from one of three varieties of mustard plant: Sinapis alba, white mustard (also known as yellow mustard); Brassica juncea, brown mustard; or Brassica nigra, black mustard. The whole, ground, cracked, or bruised mustard seeds are mixed with water, vinegar, or other liquids, and sometimes other flavorings and spices, to create a paste or sauce ranging in color from bright yellow to dark brown.

== Mustard brands ==
=== A ===
- Amora is a French company most known for its Dijon mustard. It is based in Dijon. In 1999 it was acquired by Unilever.

=== B ===
- Bertman Original Ballpark Mustard created by Joe Bertman in Cleveland is a spicy brown mustard used for more than 90 years at sports stadiums in the Cleveland, Ohio, area and is also sold at retail.
- Boar's Head produces a delicatessen-style mustard that includes white wine and horseradish. The company also produces yellow mustard and honey mustard.

=== C ===
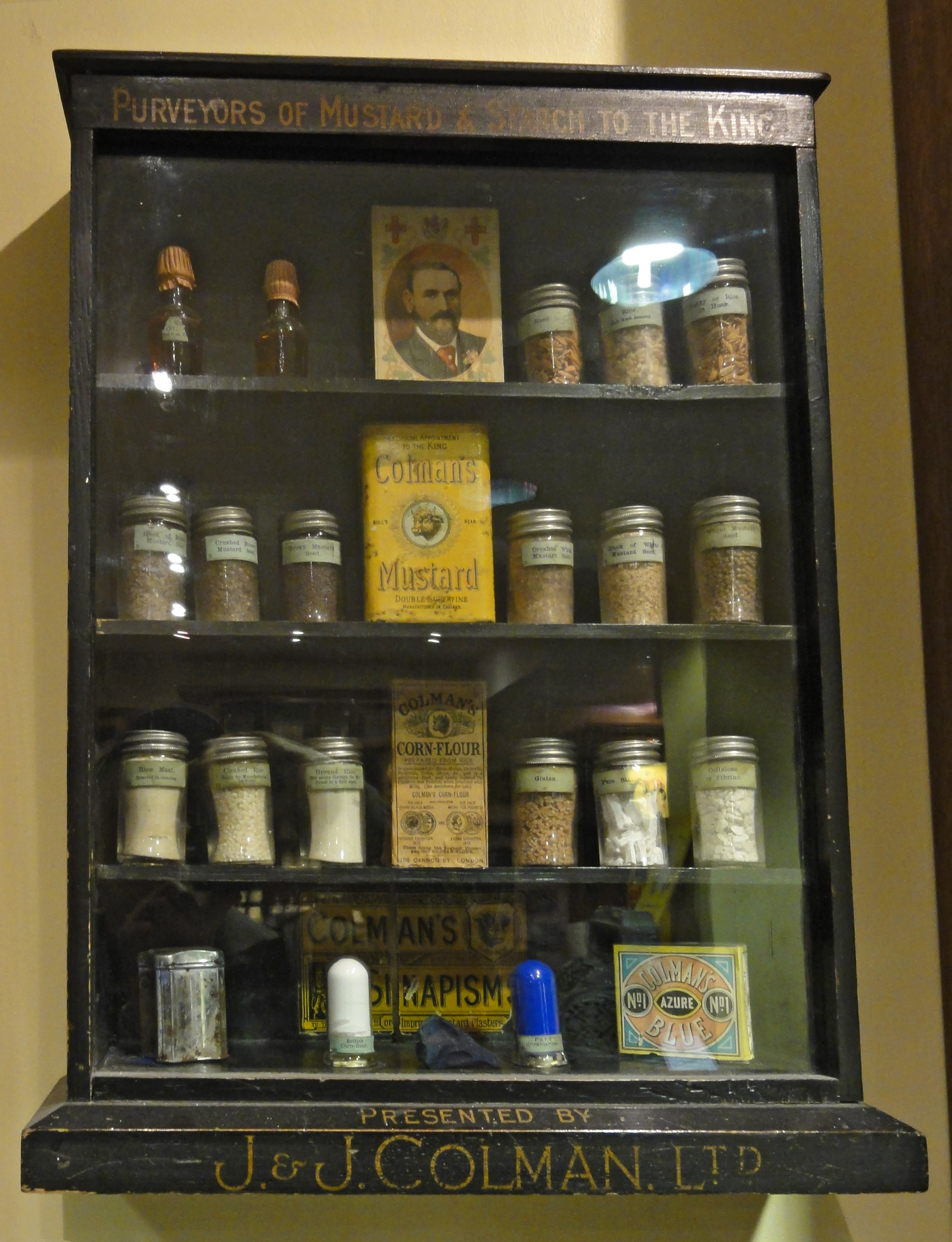
A Colman's Mustard Shop and Museum cabinet: These cabinets were supplied to schools to demonstrate the ingredients used by Colman's in product manufacture. The cabinets were produced from 1900 to 1939.

- Colman's is a British company and brand. Founded in 1814 in Norwich, Norfolk, it is one of the oldest existing food brands. Best known for its Colman's English Mustard, it sells a variety of condiments. It is a subsidiary of Unilever.

=== D ===
- Löwensenf is a German company and brand. The company was founded in 1903 in Metz (then part of the German Empire due to the outcome of the Franco-Prussian War), and is famous for its Düsseldorf mustard. It is a subsidiary of Develey Senf & Feinkost GmbH

=== E ===
- Edmond Fallot, a French company. Since its foundation in 1840 it has been producing a type of Dijon mustard that is referred to as Moutarde de Bourgogne (all its mustard seeds come from Burgundy, as opposed to Moutarde de Dijon which is not strictly geographical). Thus, Edmond Fallot's products, when labeled Moutarde de Bourgogne, all have a protected geographical indication (PGI).

=== F ===
- French's is an American brand of prepared mustard: French's "Cream Salad" mustard, the original American yellow mustard, debuted at the 1904 St. Louis World's Fair. French's is now owned by McCormick & Company.

=== G ===
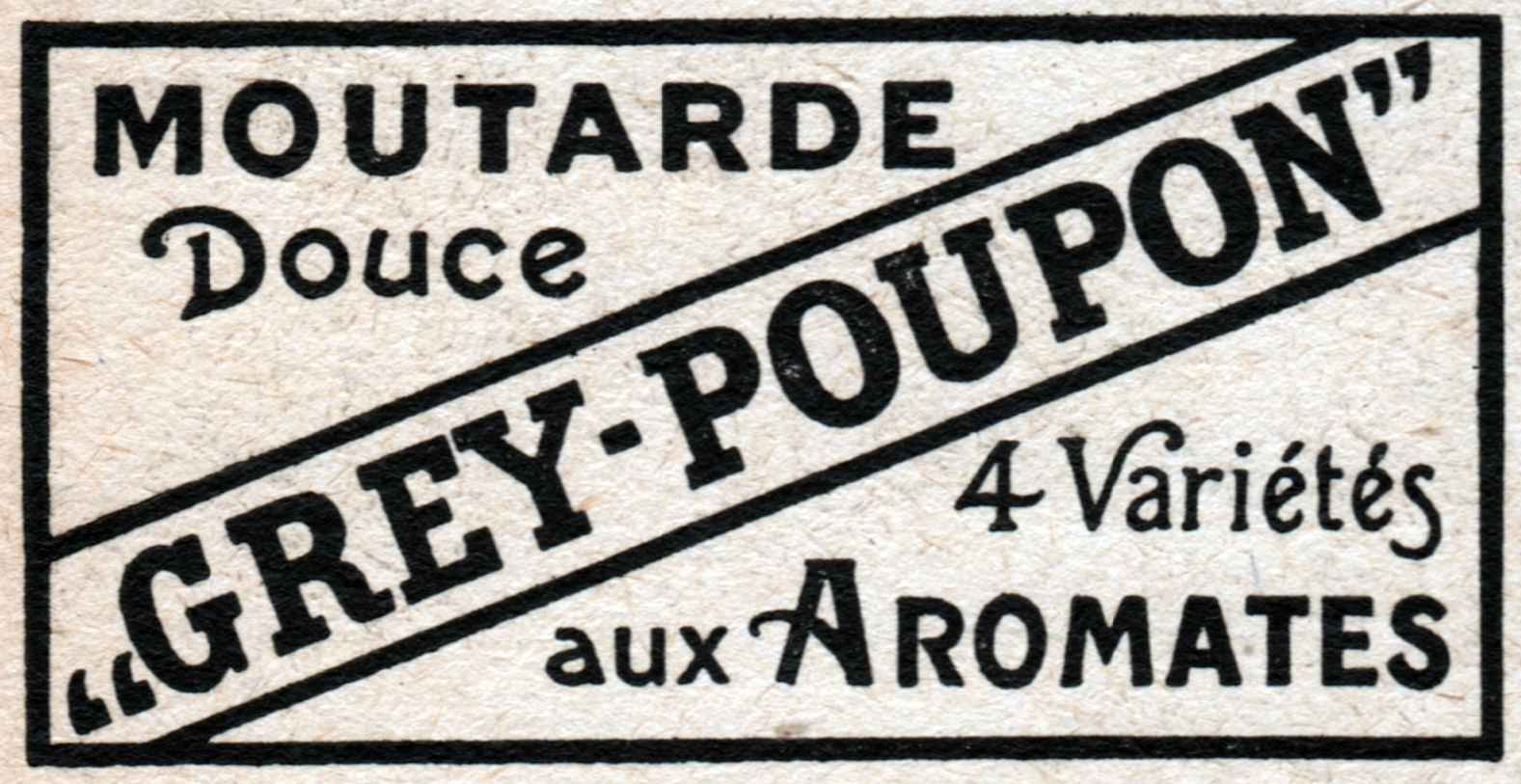
An advertisement for Grey Poupon mustard, from L'Illustration newspaper, January 1918

- Grey Poupon is a brand of Dijon mustard which originated in Dijon, France. Grey Poupon is exported to other countries such as Canada however in America the brand is owned by Kraft Heinz and manufactured in the US. Like other Dijon mustards, Grey Poupon contains a small amount of white wine. However, American Grey Poupon differs from the French in that the American contains vinegar, sugar, fruit pectin and spices while the French does not.
- Gulden's is the third-largest American manufacturer of mustard, after French's and Grey Poupon. The oldest continuously operating mustard brand in the United States, it is now owned by food industry giant ConAgra Foods. Gulden's is known for its spicy brown mustard, which includes a blend of mustard seeds and spices.

=== H ===
- Heinz produces a line of prepared mustards, including yellow, spicy brown, and honey mustards.
- Händlmaier is a German maker of Bavarian-style sweet mustard.

=== I ===
- Idun is a Norwegian brand of mustard, ketchup, and various food products.

=== K ===
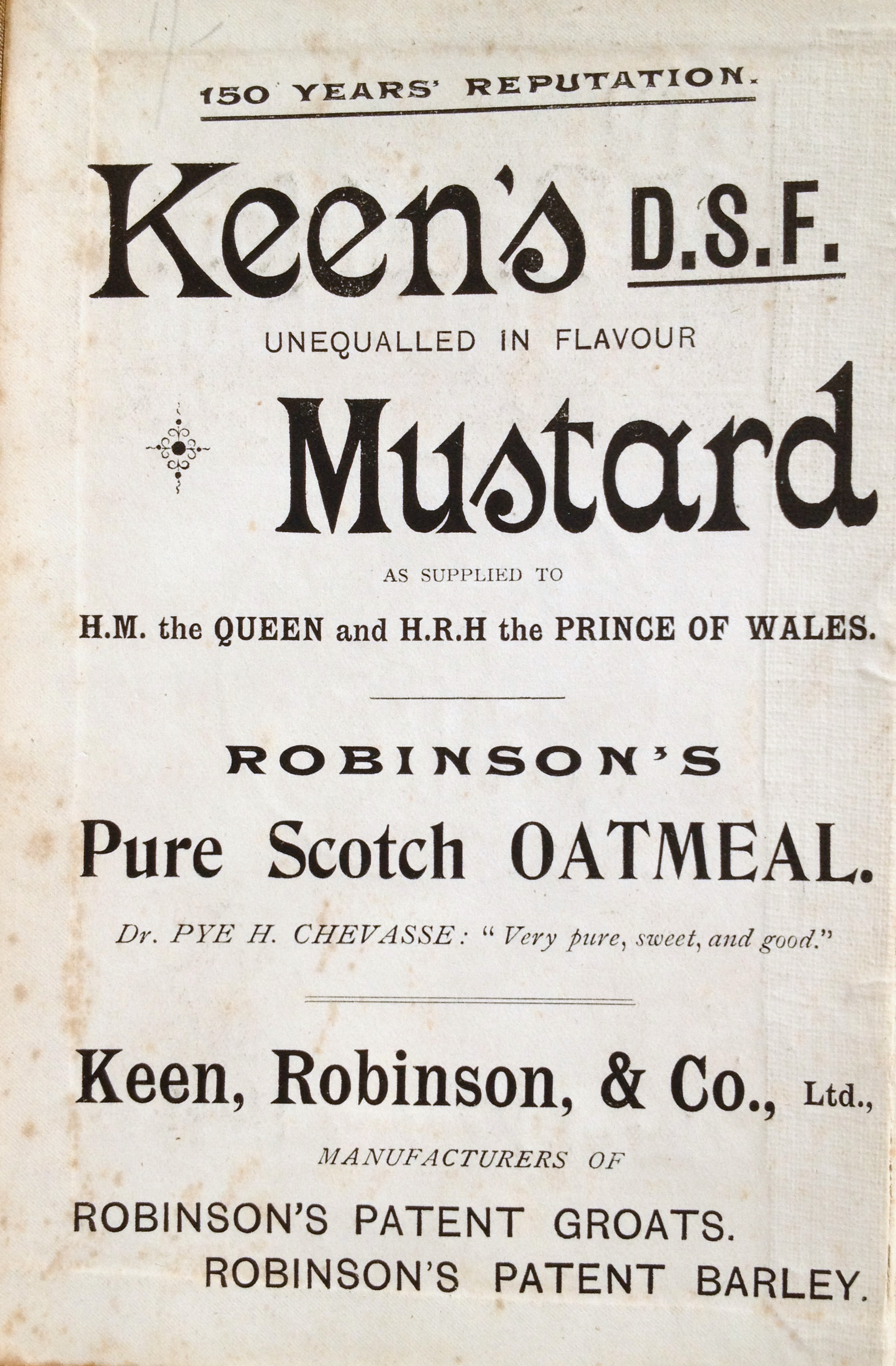
A Keen's mustard advertisement in London, 1894

- Keen's is a brand of McCormick Foods Australia Pty Ltd. Keen's Mustard Powder is created from finely crushed mustard seeds.

=== L ===
- Les Trois Petits Cochons (Three Little Pigs), a charcuterie company located in Brooklyn, sells a Dijon and a whole grain mustard made in France.
- Löwensenf, a Bavarian style sweet and spicy mustard.

=== M ===
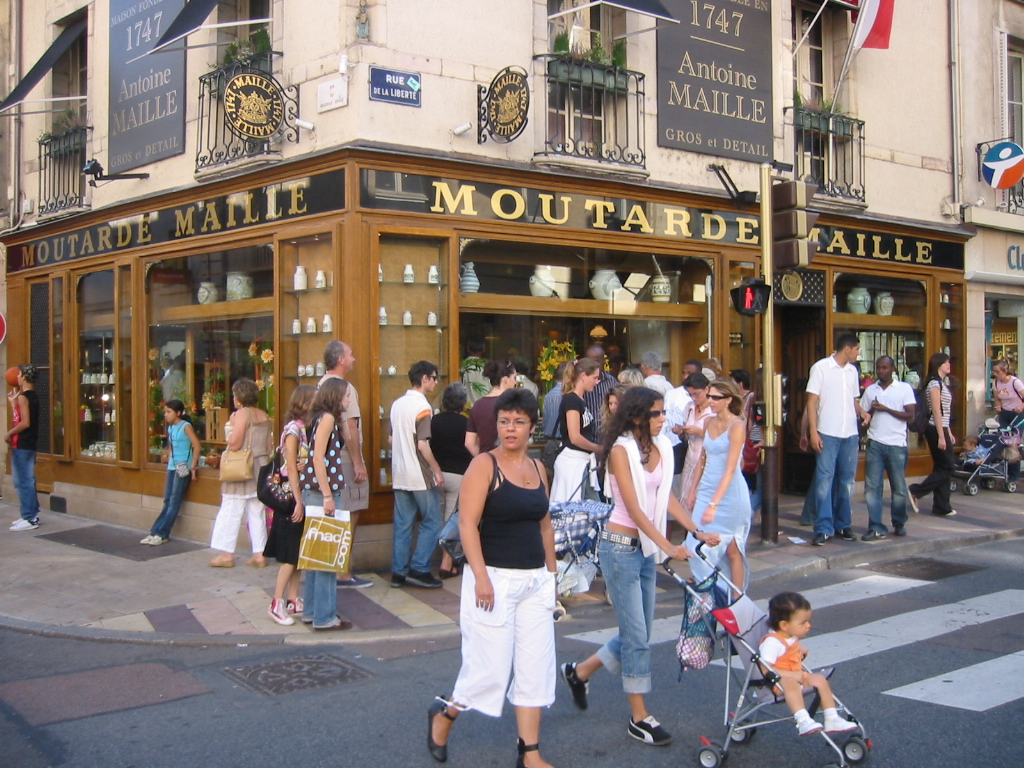
A Maille mustard shop on a busy street corner in Dijon, France. The windows display ceramic mustard jars.

- Maille is a French mustard and pickle company founded in 1747 in Marseille, when it made mostly vinegar. Later, it became well known for its Dijon mustard and cornichon and subsequently opened an establishment in Dijon. It is a subsidiary of Unilever. In North America the Maille distributed in the USA is made in Canada while the Maille that is distributed in Canada is exported from France. In 2019 Unilever United States Inc. sued in a class action by consumers who claim its “Maille” brand of mustard appears to be made in France but is in fact made in Canada.
- Masterfoods is an Australian brand of mustard, tomato sauce, and various food products.
- Meaux - Moutarde de Meaux (of the Pommery brand), grainy in appearance, a coarse-ground mustard opposite to the Dijon-type mustard which is finely ground.

=== N ===
- Natureta is a Slovenian food brand owned by ETA Kamnik, known for producing mustard since 1923, including classic, wholegrain, honey mustard, and green pepper mustard varieties.

=== P ===
- Philippe's Hot Mustard, a "rip-snorting French mustard" (LA Times) made by the French dip house Philippe's in Los Angeles since 1918. Based on an old family recipe, it's made in 40-pound batches twice a week. The exact ingredients in this smooth, ochre mustard are a secret, but it's known that mustard seeds, white vinegar and salt are among them.

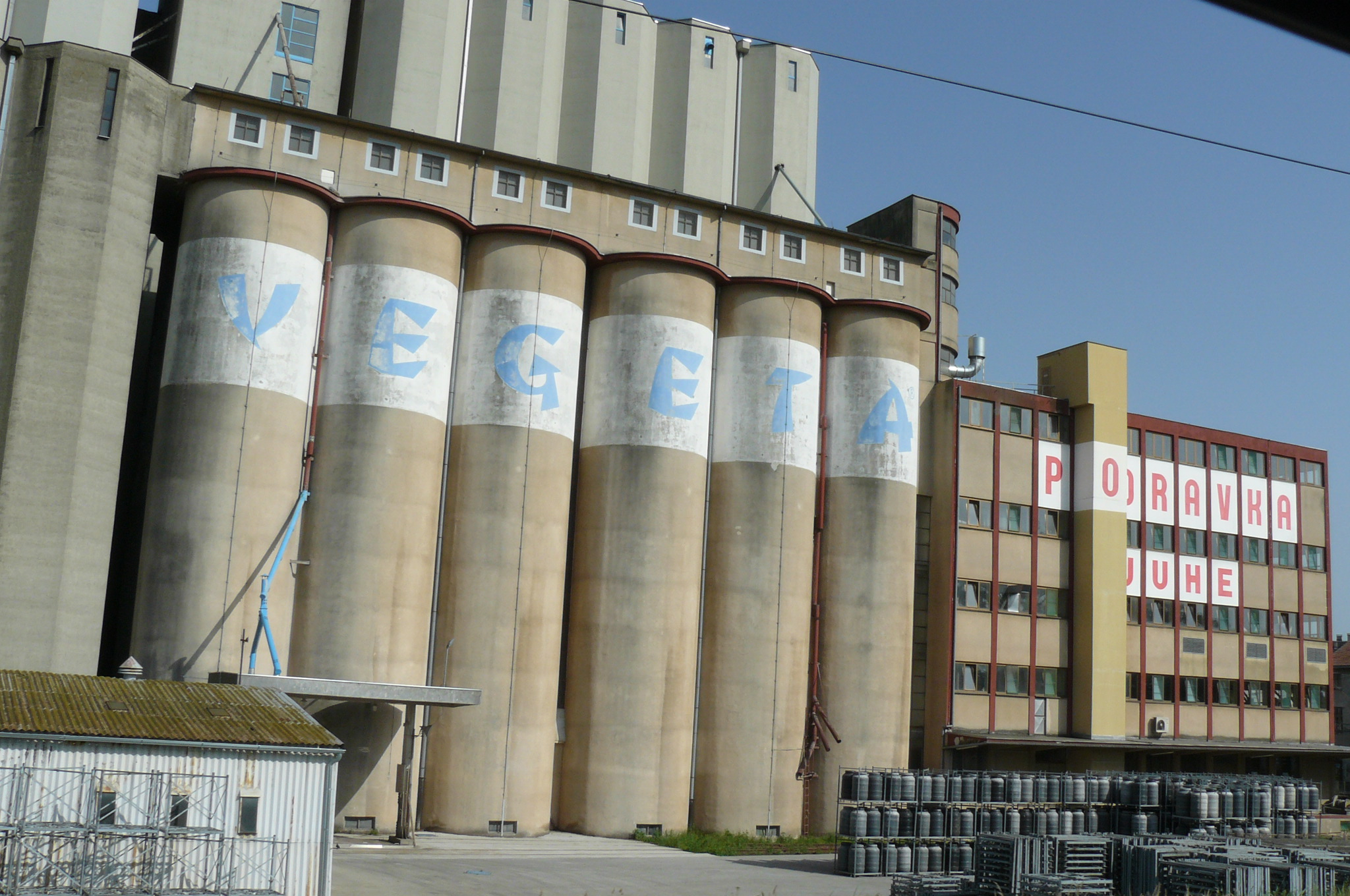
Podravka's plant in Koprivnica, Croatia

- Plochman's, an American brand of mustard made by Plochman, Inc., is recognizable by its barrel-shaped bottle.
- Podravka, a food company based in Koprivnica, Croatia, produces a brand of mustard.

=== S ===
- Stadium Mustard is the trademarked name of a mildly spicy brown mustard served in stadiums and arenas throughout the United States.
- Silver Spring Foods is a family run business started in 1929. While they are the largest grower and producer of horseradish, they have an extensive specialty mustard line.

=== T ===
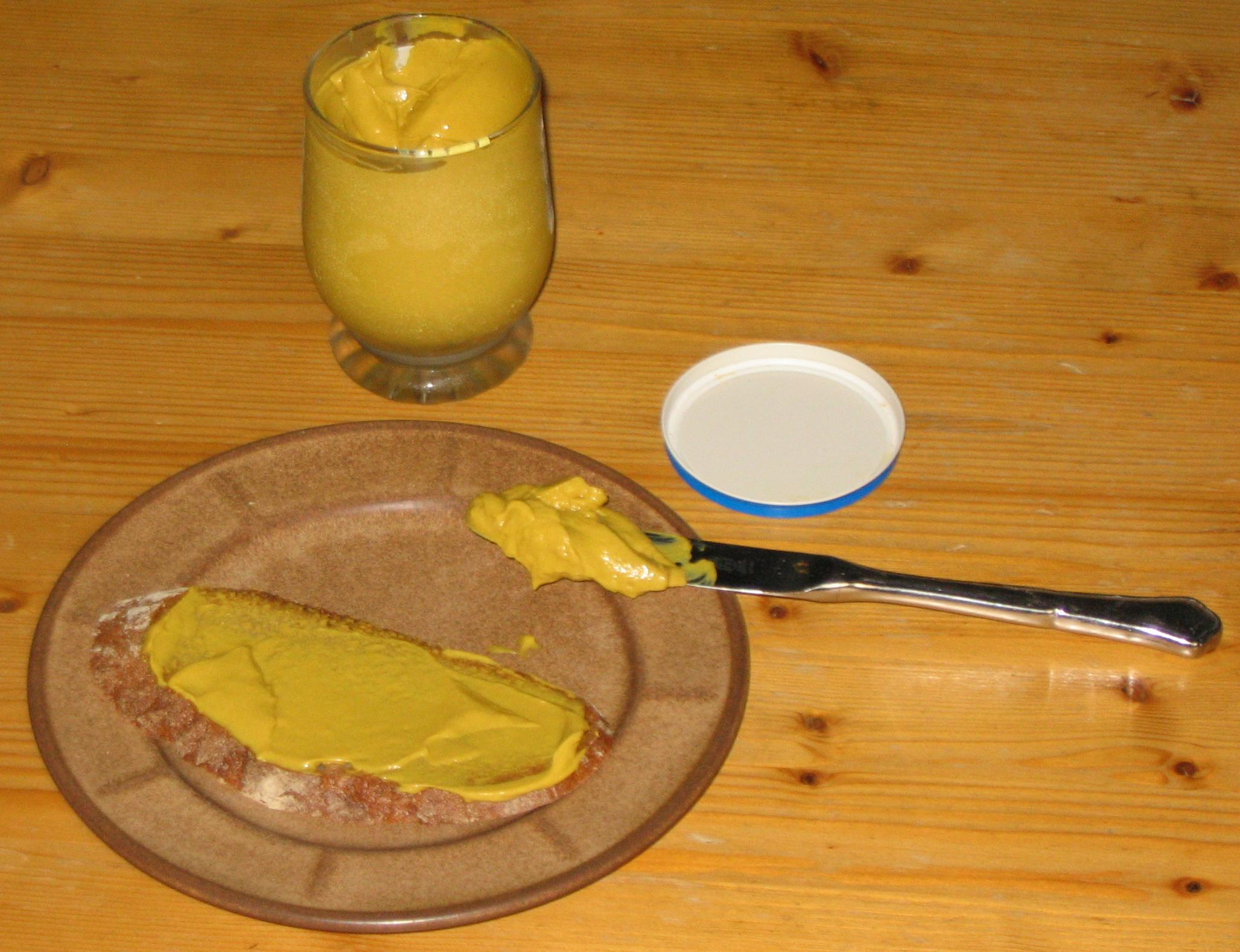
Mustard on bread

- Thomy is a Swiss food brand owned by Nestlé; it produces mustard and other condiments such as mayonnaise and salad dressings.
- Tracklements, British manufacturer, a subsidiary of Charbonneaux-Brabant.
- Turun sinappi – a mustard made in Finland, it is often used with makkara (i.e. sausage).

=== W ===
- Weber's, founded in 1922 in Buffalo, NY, produces mustard, sandwich sauce, relish and olives.
- Williams Sonoma produces a variety of beer mustard.

=== Z ===
- Zatarain's, a company based in New Orleans, Louisiana, produces mustard and other condiments and spices.
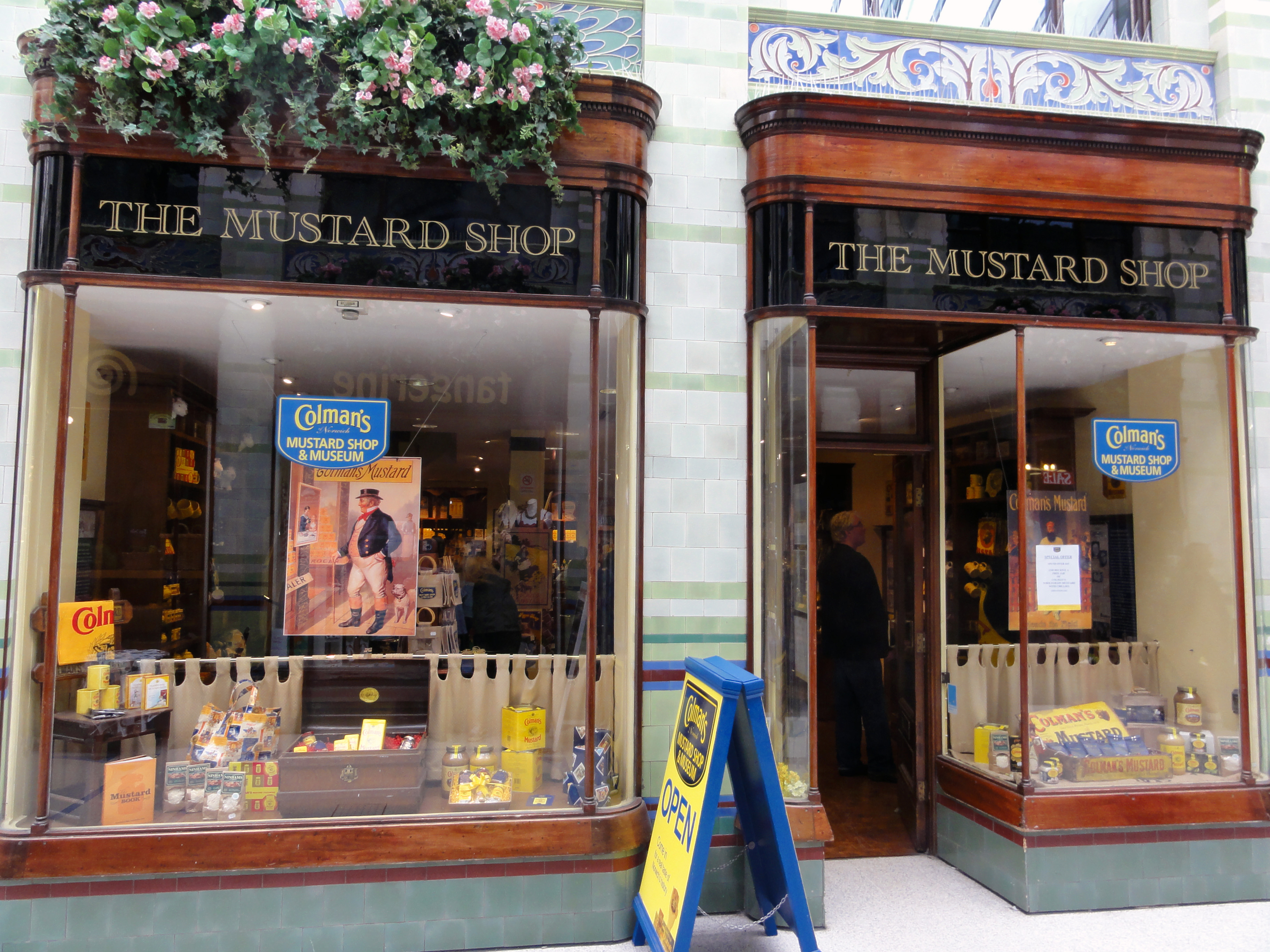
The Colman's Mustard Shop & Museum in The Royal Arcade, Norwich, England

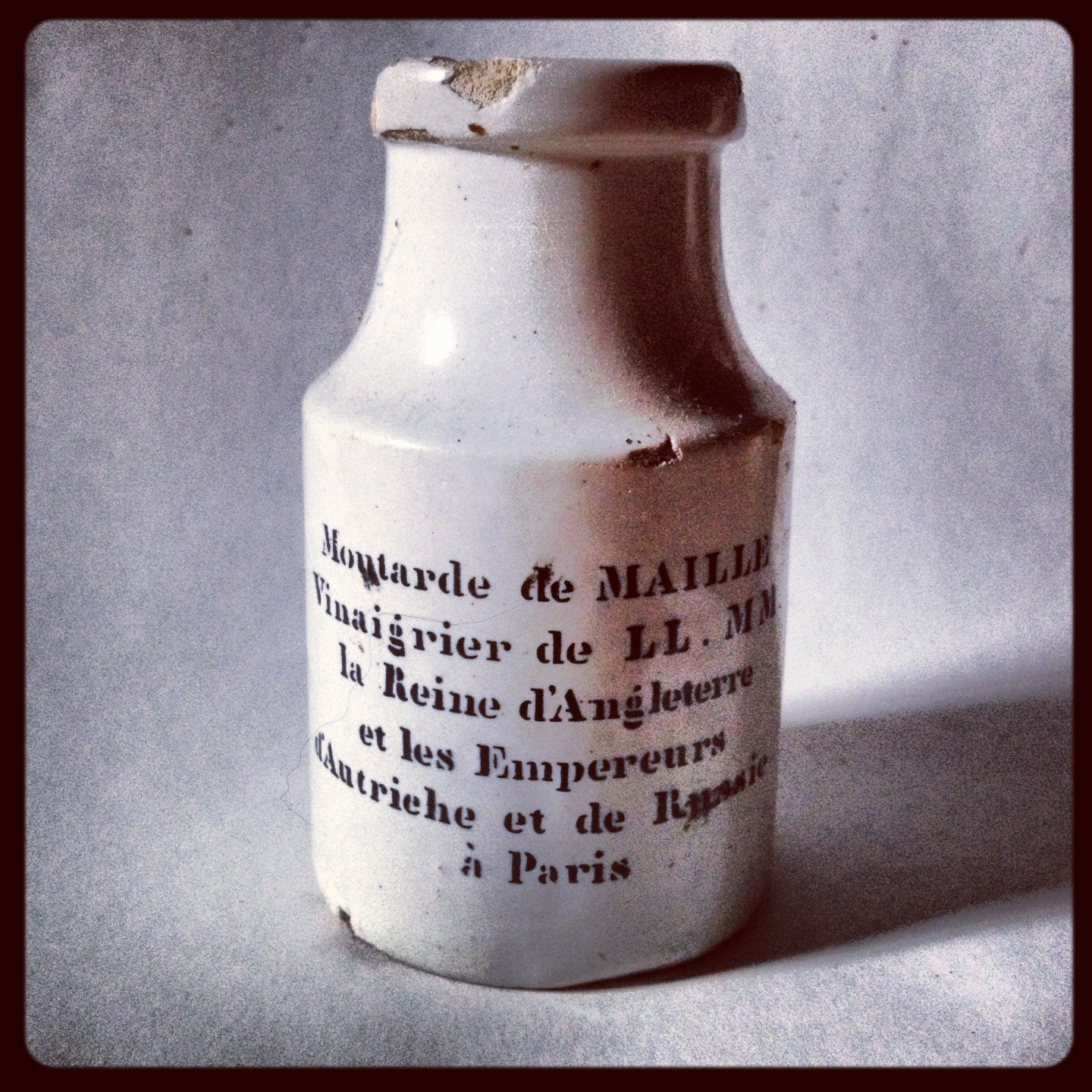
A ceramic mustard bottle from Maille, circa late 19th century

== See also ==
- Mustard oil
- National Mustard Museum
- List of condiments
- List of brand name condiments
