= Joseph Bertman =

Polish-American businessman

Joseph Bertman (1902–1988) born in Lublin, Poland, founded Joseph Bertman, Inc., as a wholesale grocery business in the 1920s in Cleveland, Ohio. He created the formulation for a mustard that became iconic in Cleveland, Ohio, which spawned two brands, Bertman Original Ball Park Mustard and Stadium Mustard.

Bertman began the business in his twenties with a partner in a garage at the Bertman home at E. 147th near Kinsman, where spices and pickles were processed and packaged. The partner was bought out during the first few years of the business. Bertman expanded his sales territory from Cleveland to Pittsburgh, Pennsylvania. After WWII he had negotiated exclusive distribution rights to many food products with a fleet of trucks and a large sales force.

The company moved to 653 E. 103rd by the mid-1930s, and changed its name to Bertman Pickle Co.. Not too shortly after that, the company moved again, this time to 2180 E. 76th. The company changed its name to Bertman Foods Company, which is now located at 7777 Grand Avenue in Cleveland.

The company sold pickles, salad dressings, spices, coffees, teas, and canned and dried foods products to schools, hospitals, and other large-scale food operations. His company supplied mustard to League Park (then the home of the Cleveland Indians) and the Cleveland Municipal Stadium. Known for coming up with products to meet the needs of his clients, Bertman invented his spicy brown mustard in 1921.

His mustard, under the family label, is served at major sports venues in Cleveland to this day. The mustard branded by one of his former employees, Stadium Authentic Mustard, is sold in retail stores, supermarkets, and online, and served in over 150 stadiums and arenas throughout the United States, but not in most Cleveland sports stadiums, where the competing Bertman's Original brand continues to be sold.

Bertman befriended and mentored many well-known names in the food business. It is said that he introduced Chef Boy-ar-dee creator Hector Boyardee to Vernon Stouffer. Lewis J. Minor started his food company, L.J. Minor Corporation with a sublet of a back room at a Bertman warehouse on E. 76th street between Cedar and Central.

== History ==
Bertman, born in Lublin, Poland, came to Cleveland as a child with his parents. He was the oldest of several children, his company biography notes.

== See also ==
- Bertman Original Ball Park Mustard
- Bertman Foods Company
- Stadium Mustard
