= Löwensenf =

German mustard company

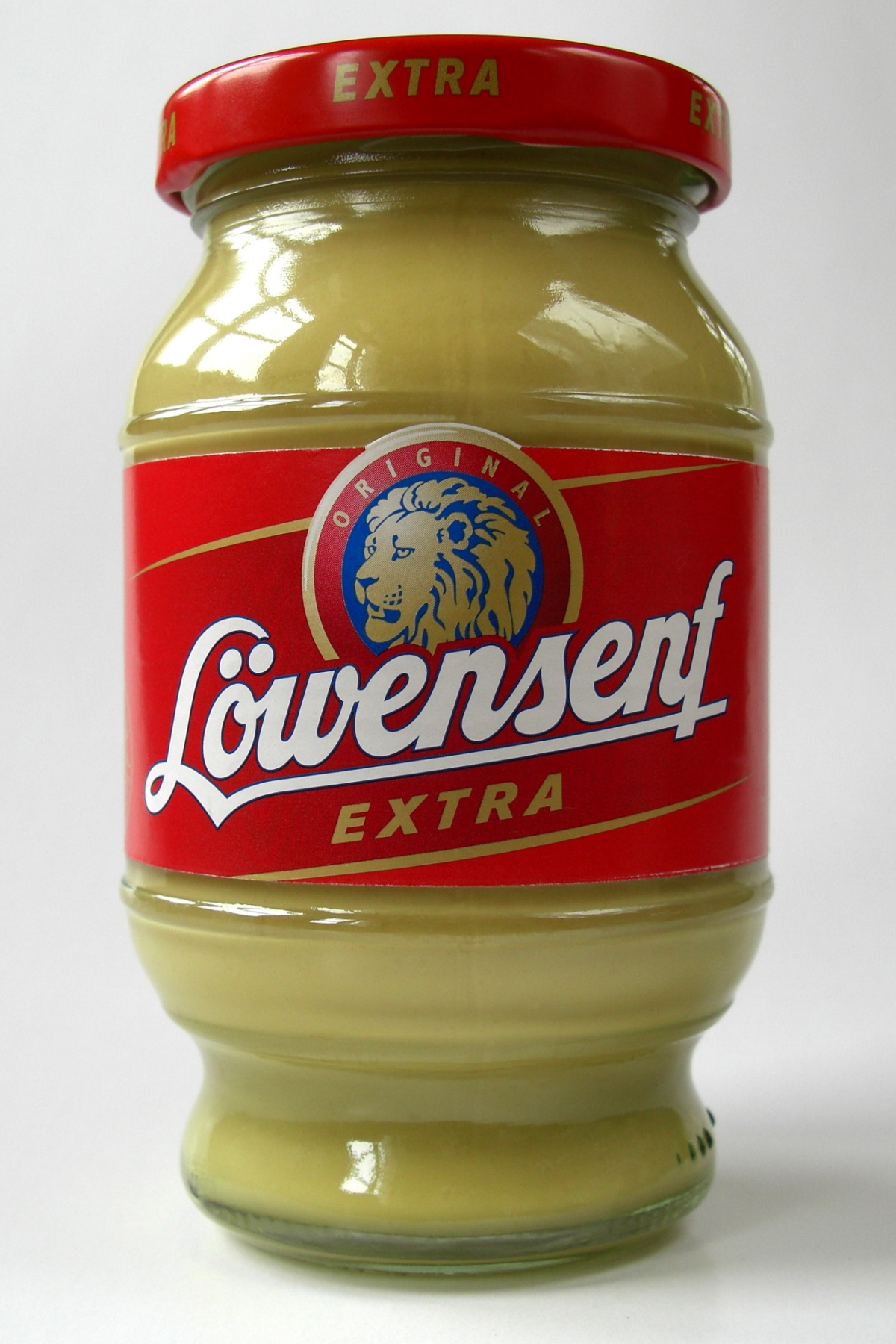
Löwensenf mustard in a jar.

Löwensenf GmbH (German: [ˈløːvn̩zɛɱf]) is a German mustard company founded in Metz (Alsace-Lorraine) in 1903, currently a subsidiary of Develey Senf & Feinkost GmbH (de). After World War I, the company relocated to Düsseldorf where it operates today. The company produces various types of mustard, including specialties like beer and fig mustard. The company operates a factory today near Düsseldorf Airport, as well as the Mustard Museum (with store) in Düsseldorf.

== History ==
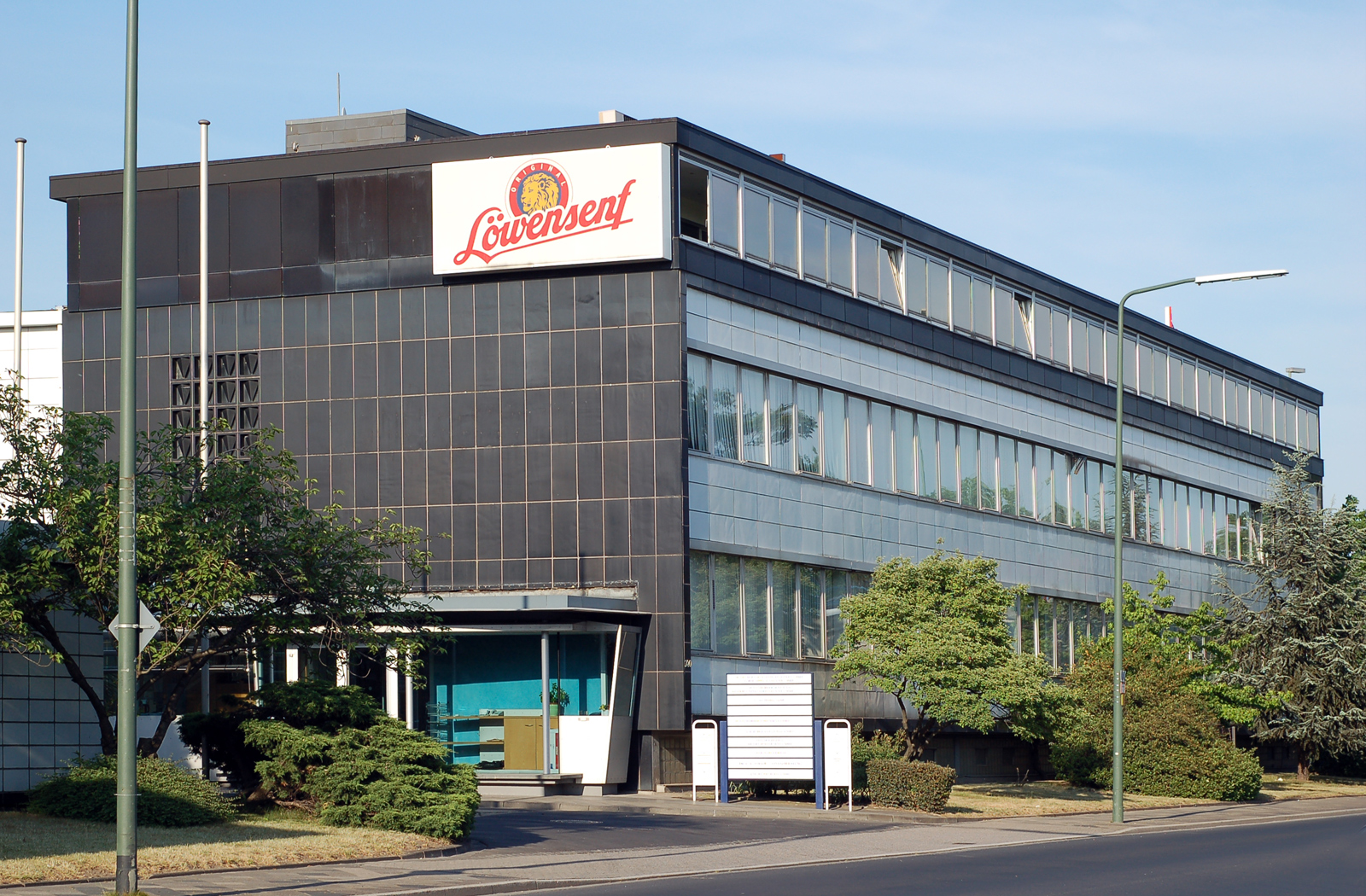
Löwensenf Headquarters in Düsseldorf.

On November 1, 1903, Otto Frenzel founded the Erste Lothringische Essig- und Senffabrik (First Lorraine Vinegar and Mustard Factory) in Metz, then a part of the German Empire. In 1920 after the First World war and the return of Metz and Alsace-Lorraine as a whole to France, the company was moved to Düsseldorf and renamed Neue Düsseldorfer Senfindustrie (New Düsseldorf Mustard Company). Also in 1920, the most well known product, Löwensenf Extra, a sharp Dijon-style mustard was introduced. After the death of Otto Frenzel in 1936, his widow, Frieda Frenzel took over management of the company. In 1948, production was started again after disruptions caused by the Second World War. In the mid-1960s, Löwensenf acquired two other Düsseldorf mustard manufacturers, ABB and Radschläger.

In 2001, Düsseldorfer Löwensenf GmbH began a merger process with the Munich based Develey Senf & Feinkost GmbH, with each company acquiring shares of the other. Distribution was taken over completely by Develey, and by the end of 2001, Löwensenf had become a subsidiary of Develey and continues to make mustard in Düsseldorf-Lichtenbroich.

On February 17, 2014, the word Düsseldorf was removed from the company name, now shortened to simply Löwensenf GmbH.

== See also ==
- List of mustard brands
