= Plochman's =

American manufacturer of mustard

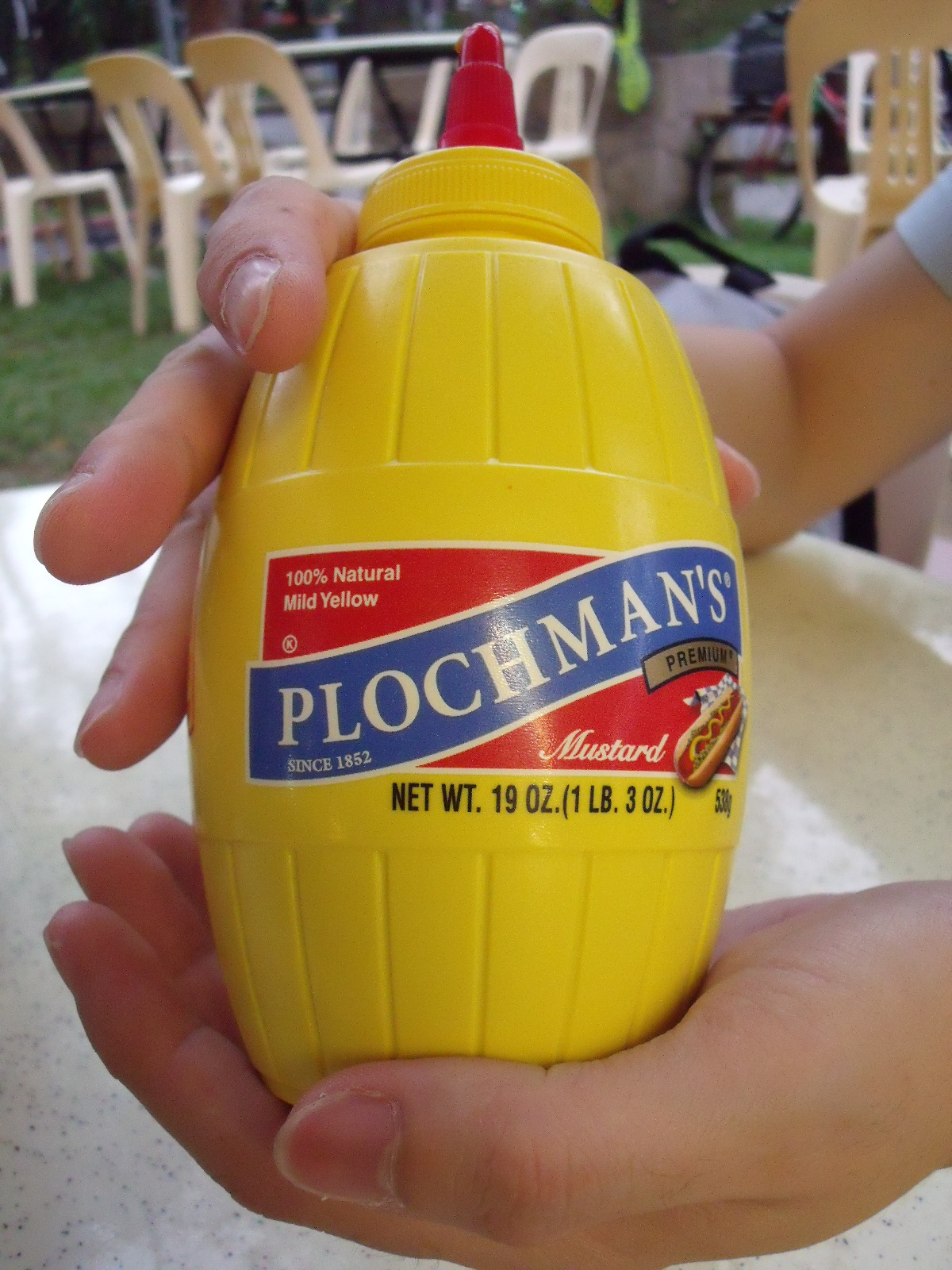
- Plochman's Mustard bottle made of LDPE plastic.
- Product type: Mustard
- Current owner: Haco Culinary
- Country: United States
- Introduced: 1852; 174 years ago
- Tagline: The True Mustard Lover's Mustard
- Website: plochman.com

Plochman's is an American brand of mustard made by Plochman, Inc., a company based in Manteno, Illinois. It is sold in a plastic barrel-shaped bottle.

Founded in 1852 as Premium Mustard Mills in Chicago, it was later acquired by Moritz Plochman (a trained chemist and emigrant from Württemberg). In 1957, it began selling mustard in the now-famous yellow squeeze barrel. It was the first successful squeeze condiment in the United States. Still based in the Chicago area, Plochman's is one of the top five brands of mustard in the United States. Plochman's sells a variety of mustard condiments, from classic American yellow, stone ground, spicy, Dijon, beer, Kosciusko, horseradish, and even Cuban and sweet fig. The "original mild yellow" variety was noted as having won the silver medal in the "World-Wide Mustard Competition" in the years 2008, 2012, and 2014.

== See also ==
- List of mustard brands
