= Three Little Pigs (disambiguation) =

The Three Little Pigs is a fairy tale.

Three Little Pigs may also refer to:

== Places in the tale ==
- Three Little Pigs (islands), three islands in the Wilhelm Archipelago

== Art, entertainment, and media ==
=== Films ===
- Three Little Pigs (film), the 1933 Walt Disney animated short film
- The 3 L'il Pigs, a 2007 Quebec French-language comedy film

=== Music ===
- "Three Little Pigs" (song), a 1992 song by Green Jellÿ
- "Three Little Pigs", a 2024 song by Joyner Lucas, released on his album Not Now I'm Busy

== Other uses ==
- Three Little Pigs (company), an American charcuterie company founded in 1975

== See also ==
- The True Story of the 3 Little Pigs! (1989), a children's book that parodies "Three Little Pigs"
- The Three Pigs, a book by David Wiesner
- Pigs in a Polka, a Merrie Melodies cartoon produced by Leon Schlesinger and directed by Friz Freleng
- Three Little Bops, a 1957 American animated musical comedy film, based on The Three Little Pigs but presenting them as a boppy jazz trio
- "Three Little Piggies", a song by Twink from the 1970 album Think Pink
