= Händlmaier =

German condiment brand name

Luise Händlmaier Senffabrikation GmbH & Co. KG
- Trade name: Händlmaier's
- Company type: GmbH & Co. KG
- Industry: Food processing
- Founded: Regensburg, Germany (1910)
- Headquarters: Regensburg, Germany
- Key people: Franz Wunderlich, CEO
- Products: Mustard
- Revenue: €15 million (2007)
- Website: haendlmaier.de

Händlmaier's is a condiment brand manufactured by Luise Händlmaier Senffabrikation GmbH & Co. KG, based in Regensburg, Germany. They are primarily known for their sweet Bavarian mustard.

== Products ==
Händlmaier's best-known product is a coarse, sweet mustard. The company also produces conventional mustard, horseradish sauce, salad dressing, and other condiments.

== History ==
In 1910, master butcher Karl and his wife Johanna Händlmaier founded a butcher shop on Gesandtenstraße in Regensburg. In 1914, Johanna Händlmaier created a recipe for a sweet Bavarian mustard, which today is principally consumed with Weißwurst and Leberkäse.

In 1945, after the end of the Second World War, Karl Händlmaier's son Joseph took over the butcher shop and ran it together with his wife. After the death of Joseph in 1955, his widow Luise ran the butcher shop until 1964, when, at the age of 54, she sold all six locations to a local sausage producer to concentrate exclusively on the production and sale of the sweet mustard.

After the death of Luise Händlmaier in 1981, the company was run by Christa Aumer, Luise's daughter. In 1988, Christa Aumer's son Franz Wunderlich assumed control of the company.

The firm relocated in 1992 from the Regensburg city center into an industrial area Haslbach further outside the city. From there, the company also produces mustard for private label discount chains such as Aldi or Lidl.

== Figures ==
Händlmaier is the market leader in Germany for sweet mustard, with a market share over 80% in 2017, with a turnover of €13 million in 2004. Händlmaier is organized as a GmbH & Co. KG.

== Sponsorship ==
In the 2012–13 2. Bundesliga season, Händlmaier was the main sponsor for SSV Jahn Regensburg.

== See also ==
- List of mustard brands
