= Bertman Original Ballpark Mustard =

Brown mustard brand

Bertman Original Ballpark Mustard is a brown mustard made by Bertman Foods Company, a Cleveland, Ohio, food manufacturer and distributor which has produced several varieties of mustards since 1925, well known regionally because they are served at sports stadiums around Cleveland and sold in stores across Northeastern Ohio.

There is a version of Bertman's original mustard recipe sold by The Davis Food Company called Stadium Authentic Mustard, but the original recipe, made by Bertman's organization, carries the "Bertman Original" designation. Bertman's original recipe is still being made by his family business

== Bertman's Spicy Brown Mustard ==
Bertman's spicy brown mustard has been used at sports stadiums in and around Cleveland for over 90 years, including League Park, Cleveland Municipal Stadium, and Progressive Field. Joe Bertman created the mustard for League Park, one of his top accounts, in the garage of his home in Cleveland's Kinsman neighborhood. Bertman's is well known to sports fans, and was declared the "signature concession item" by ESPN.com writer Jim Caple.

== History ==
Joseph "Joe" Bertman began the business in his twenties with a partner in a garage at the Bertman home at E. 147th near Kinsman, where spices and pickles were processed and packaged. The partner was bought out during the first few years of the business. Bertman expanded his sales territory from Cleveland to Pittsburgh, Pennsylvania. After WWII he negotiated exclusive distribution rights to many food products with a fleet of trucks and a large sales force.

The company moved to 653 E. 103rd by the mid-1930s, and changed its name to Bertman Pickle Co.. Not too shortly after that, the company moved again, this time to 2180 E. 76th. The company changed its name to Bertman Foods Company, which is now located at 7777 Grand Avenue in Cleveland.

The company sold pickles, salad dressings, spices, coffees, teas, and canned and dried foods products to schools, hospitals, and other large-scale food operations. His company supplied mustard to League Park (then home of the Cleveland Indians) and the Cleveland Municipal Stadium. Known for coming up with products to meet the needs of his clients, Bertman invented his spicy brown mustard in 1921.

His mustard, under the family label, is served at major sports venues in Cleveland. The mustard branded by a former employee, Stadium Authentic Mustard, is sold in retail stores, supermarkets, and online, and served in over 150 stadiums and arenas throughout the United States, but not in most Cleveland sports stadiums, where the competing Bertman's Original brand continues to be sold.

== Cleveland's mustard controversy ==
In 1966, Cleveland had one local brown mustard: Joe Bertman's. David Dwoskin, a Bertman sales rep, represented the Bertman brand to retailers throughout Ohio. In 1969, The Davis Food Company partnered with Joe to make "The Authentic Stadium Mustard" available for retail sales in supermarkets. In 1971, Dwoskin registered the name "The Authentic Stadium Mustard" for his new company Davis Food Company. In 1982, Davis Food Company obtained exclusive rights to sell to both wholesale and retail markets as well as stadiums, arenas and other venues. In the early 1980s there was a disagreement between Bertman and Dwoskin. Dwoskin produced his own mustard under the Stadium brand through his own company. The Bertman Family continues to sell its version of the mustard through its Bertman Foods Company.

Dwoskin told Cleveland.com that his mustard is served in 150 stadiums in the United States. Bertman Original is served at all Cleveland sports stadiums. Bertman Original is licensed to feature the Block C logo of the Cleveland Guardians baseball club, and is served at all Cleveland sports venues save Huntington Bank Field, which serves Stadium Authentic.

Both mustards are sold in grocery stores, specialty food shops, and online. The trademarked "Bertman Original Ball Park Mustard" is still sold at Cleveland sports venues, and as a competing brand to Stadium Mustard by the Bertman family.

== See also ==
- List of mustard brands
