= Grey Poupon =

Brand of mustard originating in France

- Product type: Mustard
- Current owner: Associated British Foods (UK & Europe); Kraft Heinz (US)
- Produced by: Kraft Foods
- Country: Dijon, France
- Introduced: 1866; 160 years ago
- Markets: Worldwide
- Previous owners: List: Grey Poupon; Heublein Inc.; RJR Nabisco; Kraft Foods; Maille; Unilever (UK)
- Website: greypoupon.org

Grey Poupon (French: [pupɔ̃]) is a global brand of Dijon style mustard which originated in Dijon, France in 1777. Grey Poupon began mass production in 1866.

The U.S. rights to the brand were acquired by the Heublein Company in 1946, later passing on to Kraft Foods. Grey Poupon became popular in the United States in the late 1970s and 1980s as American tastes broadened from conventional American yellow mustards, aided in large part by a memorable advertising campaign emphasizing the product's association with luxury.

Like other Dijon mustards, Grey Poupon contains a small amount of white wine. The American version is made with brown mustard seed grown in Canada.

== History ==
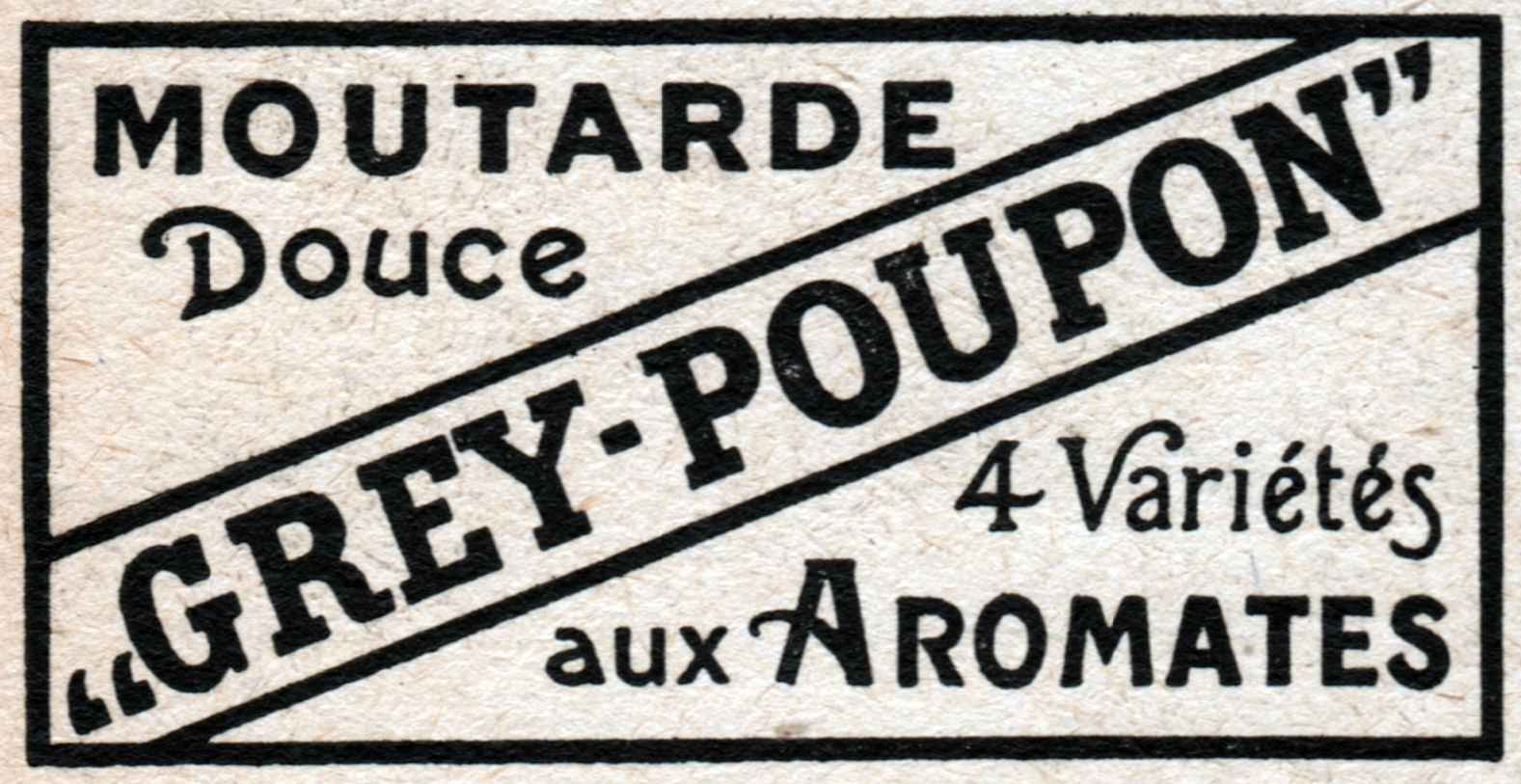
1918 French advertisement

In 1860 Maurice Grey (b. Urcy, France, 1816; d. 1897), a mustard-maker based in Dijon, was awarded a Royal Appointment in 1860 for developing a machine that dramatically increased the speed of manufacture. In 1866 he received financing for putting it into use by partnering with fellow Dijon moutardier, Auguste Poupon, creating Grey-Poupon.

In 1946, the Heublein Company bought the American rights from the original company.

In 1952, deputy CEO Joseph Poupon and André Ricard bought the popular Marseilles brand Maille. In 1970, the directors of Grey Poupon and Maille formed a conglomerate called S.E.G.M.A. Maille. Soon afterwards, the new company decided to phase out the Grey Poupon label in France.

In America, R. J. Reynolds Tobacco Company acquired Heublein in 1982 and merged it with Nabisco in 1985 to form RJR Nabisco. In 1999, Kraft Foods acquired Nabisco, including the Grey Poupon brand.

In 2000, Amora-Maille was acquired by Unilever and UK trademark rights to Grey Poupon were assumed by it until 2005 when the rights were sold to G Costa & Company Limited, a subsidiary of Associated British Foods. In 2008, Associated British Foods folded G Costa into AB World Foods.

Grey Poupon Dijon and wholegrain mustard are still produced in France for the European markets as well as Canada. Production of Grey Poupon for the American market moved from Pennsylvania to Holland, Michigan, following Kraft Heinz's expansion of its 120-year-old production facility there. The American version contains vinegar, sugar, fruit pectin and spices while the original French version does not.

== Marketing ==
=== Advertising ===
Heublein increased the visibility and name recognition of their mustard brand with a 1981 commercial pointing out that "one can enjoy the finer things of life with white wine mustard without paying high prices", in which a Rolls-Royce pulls up alongside another Rolls-Royce, and a passenger in one asks "Pardon me, would you have any Grey Poupon?" The other responds, "But of course!", followed by the jar of Grey Poupon being passed between the vehicles. In one variation, the characters are on the Orient Express.

The commercial spawned a number of variations, often comedic; a 1991 version features Ian Richardson asking Paul Eddington if he has any Grey Poupon, to which Eddington replies, "But of course", then motions for his driver to speed away. It is implied that they are playing the roles of the fictitious British Prime Ministers Francis Urquhart (from House of Cards) and Jim Hacker (from Yes, Prime Minister), respectively. Another commercial included the introduction of a plastic squeeze bottle, wherein the bottle makes a flatulent noise, much to the mortification of the driver.

The advertising campaign helped solidify Grey Poupon's status as a product associated with the wealthy; in 1992, Grey Poupon had the strongest correlation between a person's income and whether or not they used the product.

In 2013, Grey Poupon created a new advertisement, playing upon the 1980s commercial, an action movie spoof where the driver who took the Grey Poupon jar (played by British actor Frazer Douglas) is chased down by the mustard's original owner (played by American actor Rod McCary). The spot was nominated for an Emmy for best commercial.

=== Brand extensions ===
Kraft introduced three new specialty mustards under the Grey Poupon brand: a coarse-ground mustard with whole mustard seeds marketed as "country mustard", a spicy brown mustard with diced yellow onions marketed as "Parisian", and a honey mustard with clover honey and spices. Only the coarse ground version remains in production.

== In popular culture ==
The "Pardon me, would you have any Grey Poupon?" commercials have been parodied in many films and TV shows, including Wayne's World (1992), Married... with Children's "Old Insurance Dodge", WWE SmackDown and Family Guy's "Blue Harvest". The question was asked by Michael J. Fox's character, while preparing to eat a frog dog in the film The Hard Way (1991), by Little Richard in The Naked Truth, and by the Dutch character (Joost Michael de Witt) in Emilio Estevez's film The Way (2010). The line was also mentioned in a deleted scene from The Office, said by character Andy Bernard.. It is also mentioned during an episode of the TV sitcom Superstore.

In her semi-autobiographical 1983 novel Heartburn, Nora Ephron's protagonist describes the recipe for an ideal vinaigrette as "mix two tablespoons of Grey Poupon mustard with two tablespoons good red wine vinegar. Then, whisking constantly with a fork, slowly add six tablespoons olive oil, until the vinaigrette is thick and creamy; this makes a very strong vinaigrette that is perfect for salad greens like arugula and watercress and endive."

The Grey Poupon name has appeared frequently in hip-hop and rap lyrics since 1992, when Das EFX mentioned the brand on their song "East Coast". Artists such as MF Doom, Kanye West, Eminem, Big Sean, Jay-Z, Busta Rhymes, Kendrick Lamar, and T-Pain have all referenced Grey Poupon in their song lyrics. According to rapper Open Mike Eagle, the prevalence of these references is attributable to how convenient it is to create a rhyme with the brand name as well as how strongly the product is associated with class, style, and luxury.

== See also ==
- List of mustard brands
- List of brand name condiments
- Maille Dijon mustard
