= Unox =

Dutch food brand

- Produced by: Zwanenberg Food Group
- Website: unox.nl

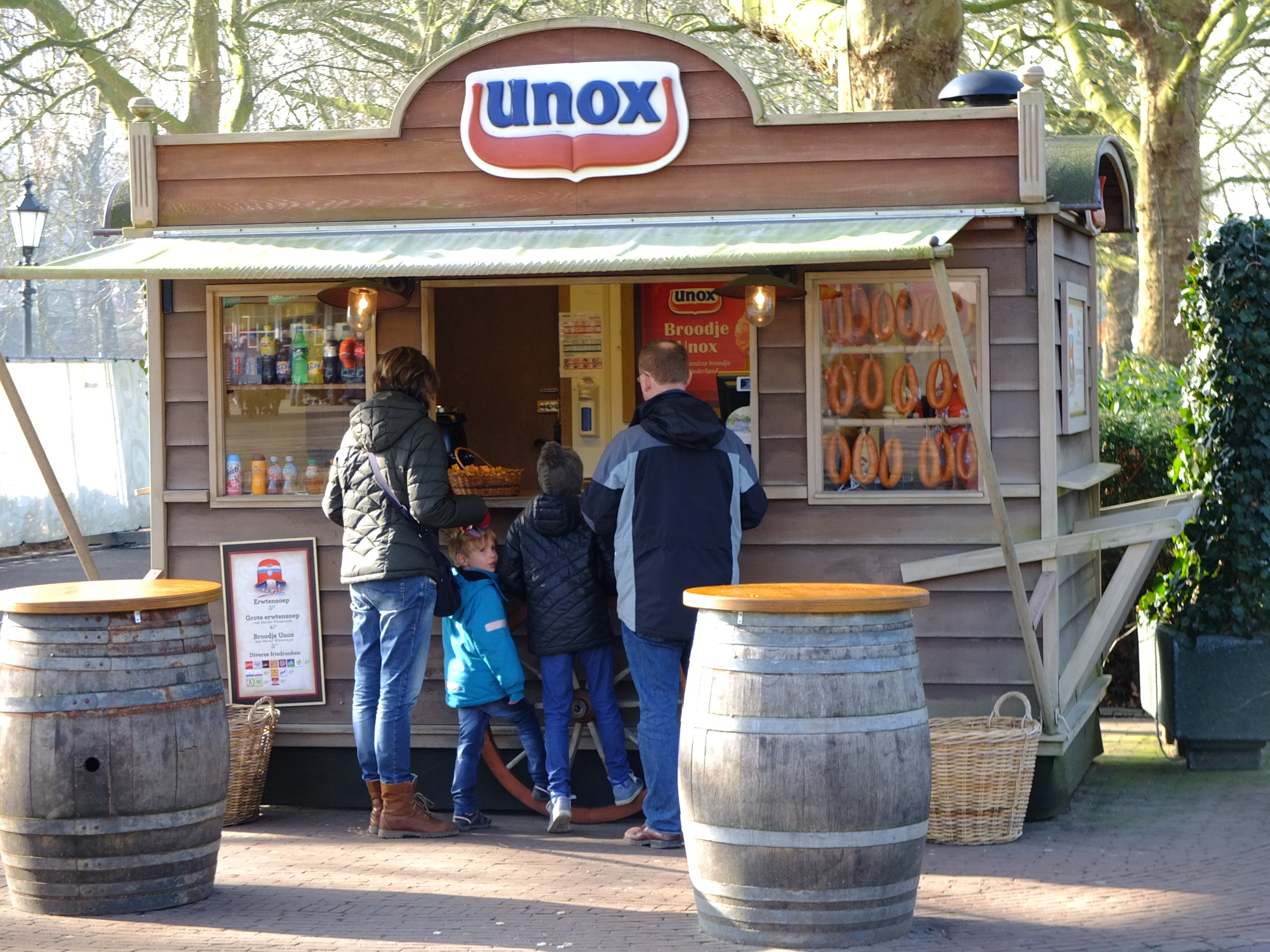
Unox stand at the Efteling

Unox (Dutch pronunciation: [ˈynɔks]) is a food brand that is available in the Netherlands, Belgium and Germany. Much of the brand has been divested to Zwanenberg group with effect from December 2024 with Unilever retaining the Cup-a-soup and instant noodle lines.

Unox marketing manager Florens Tegelaar said: "Since 1937, Unox has brought winter products, predominantly meat, and since 1957 also soups. These hearty foods are typically Dutch and consistently communicate winter. As soon as it gets cold, we are there."

The annual New Year's Dive (Nieuwjaarsduik) in Scheveningen is sponsored by Unox, where they hand out orange knit caps and pea soup (snert).

In 2018, Unilever sold the Unox factory in Oss to Zwanenberg Food Group but retained the brand Unox. Unilever sold the brand in 2024.

== See also ==
- Turun sinappi
