= Thomy =

Swiss food brand owned by Nestlé

- Product type: Food, Mayonnaise, Mustard, Sauce, Condiment, Cooking aids
- Current owner: Nestlé
- Country: Switzerland
- Introduced: 1907
- Markets: Switzerland, Europe
- Tagline: Das gewisse Extra (The certain extra)

Thomy is a Swiss food brand owned by Nestlé. It produces condiments such as mayonnaise, mustard, salad dressings, tomato puree and cooking oil.

Thomy is currently only produced in Switzerland, Serbia, Germany and Israel (By Osem, since 2024), although it is exported throughout Europe.

Thomy currently runs operating plants in Karlsruhe and Neuss in Germany, and in Basel, Switzerland.

== History ==
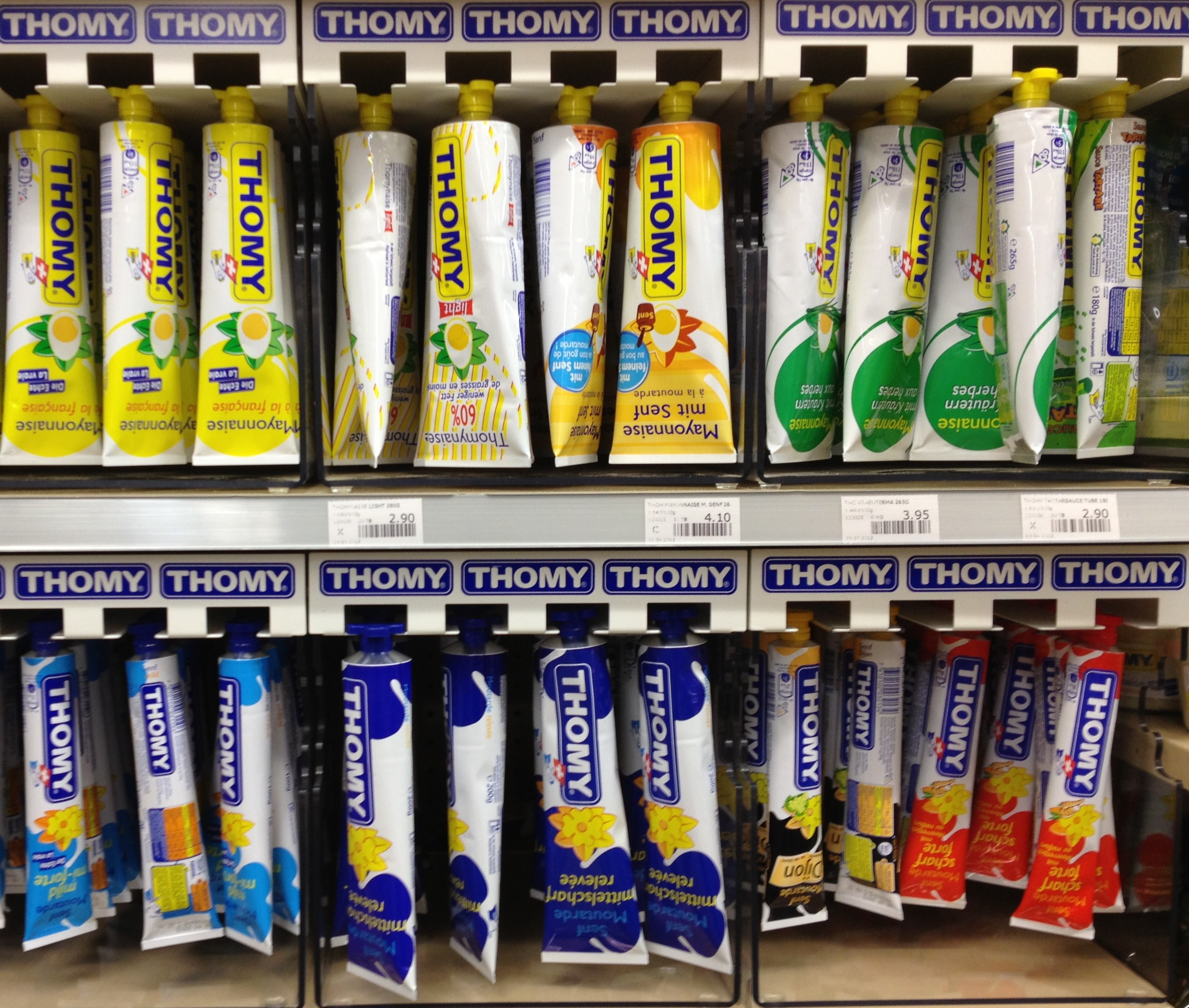
Thomy products

From the beginning of the 19th century, Switzerland had been supplied with roasted chicory roots, used as a coffee substitute or additive, by German firms, above all by Franck, which opened a chicory factory in Basel in 1884. From 1860 the firm Oppliger & Geiser in Langenthal also processed chicory. It was taken over in 1894 by Johann Friedrich Thomi and Karl Meister and was called Helvetia from 1901.

In 1907 Helvetia began producing mustard and became the first company to produce it on an industrial scale in Switzerland. Its mustard was sold in bulk in large stoneware pots under the Langenthaler Senf brand. Subsequently renamed Thomi’s Langenthaler Senf, the brand was eventually registered under the name Thomy’s Senf in 1930, with the ‘i’ being replaced with a ‘y’ in Thomy to make it a more internationally marketable name. The company Thomi + Franck was formed in Basel in 1930 by the merger of Heinrich Franck Söhne AG and Helvetia Langenthal.

Hans Thomi, the founder of Thomi & Franck SA also decided to sell his mustard in a tube to set it apart from that of his competitors. In 1951 Thomy began mayonnaise production as well, while in 1976 they expanded to introduce bottled salad dressings.

Thomi + Franck made acquisitions, buying the Berna vinegar factory in 1965 and the Leisi baked goods factory in 1969. In 1971 the Franck share passed to Nestlé through Ursina-Franck. The Thomi family ran Thomi + Franck until 1989, when, for lack of a successor, it handed over the management and its minority stake of 49% to Nestlé.

Under the brand Thomy's, Thomi + Franck shaped Swiss cooking with mustard in a tube from 1934, mayonnaise in a tube from 1951, and vinegar from 1966, and also with the coffee additive Franck Aroma from 1930 and the coffee extract Incarom from 1957.

== Mascot ==
The Thomy man character, or “Thomymännli”, was the product of a competition held in 1931 in which the company asked its consumers for submissions. The competition received 20,000 responses, and the name Senf-Thomy was chosen along with the famous tube shaped character. The character has been the main icon for Thomy since the early 1990s.

== Popularity in Switzerland ==
Thomy has been voted among the twenty most popular Swiss brands for the last ten years, demonstrating its popularity in Switzerland. It also enjoys a 99% recognition rate in Swiss households, and is consumed in over 2.3 million households.

An average Swiss household consumes about five Thomy mayonnaise tubes a year as well as three Thomy mustard tubes. The per capita consumption of mayonnaise and mustard in Switzerland is 1 kg and 500g respectively.

== Products ==
In 2008 Thomy launched a new Tartare Light mayonnaise, containing 50% less fat and mayonnaise made from rapeseed oil.

Thomy has recently partnered with Coop Naturaplan and now produces certified organic mustard, mayonnaise, and salad dressings.

== See also ==
- List of mustard brands
