= Amora (mustard) =

French condiment brand owned by Anglo-Dutch Unilever

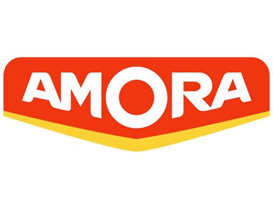

Amora Maille Societe Industrielle, also written as Amora-Maille, is a French company and brand that manufactures condiments. The company is a subsidiary of McCormick & Company and the leading condiment maker in France. The company operates two major brands, Amora and Maille.

== History ==
Amora Maille was formerly headquartered in Dijon, France.

In 1999, the company had around 1,000 employees and operated plants in the communes of Dijon, Chevigny, Appoigny, Carvin and Vitrolles. The company also had a sales operation in Belgium at the time. A mustard museum was located at the Amora Maille plant in Dijon.

In 1999, Amora Maille was acquired by the multinational consumer goods company Unilever. Unilever paid $739.3 million for the company, equivalent to 460 million pounds or 716.5 million euros. The company was sold by a division of the French banking group Paribas SA, the Paribas Affaires Industrielles LBO Fund, and several other investors. The acquisition was estimated to increase Unilever's share of the European culinary market from 9% to 12%. The site now produces all the Amora and Maille mustard sold in France and around the world. The gherkins sold under the Amora and Maille brands, which have always been harvested in Yonne, have come from China or India since the year 2000.

In 2008, Amora Maille announced that it was closing three of its plants in Dijon, laying off more than half of their workers, and concentrating their operations in Chevigny. The Dijon plant closed in 2009, some production was exported to Poland, and as of 2018 part of the company's production takes place in Chevigny-Saint-Sauveur.

== Products ==
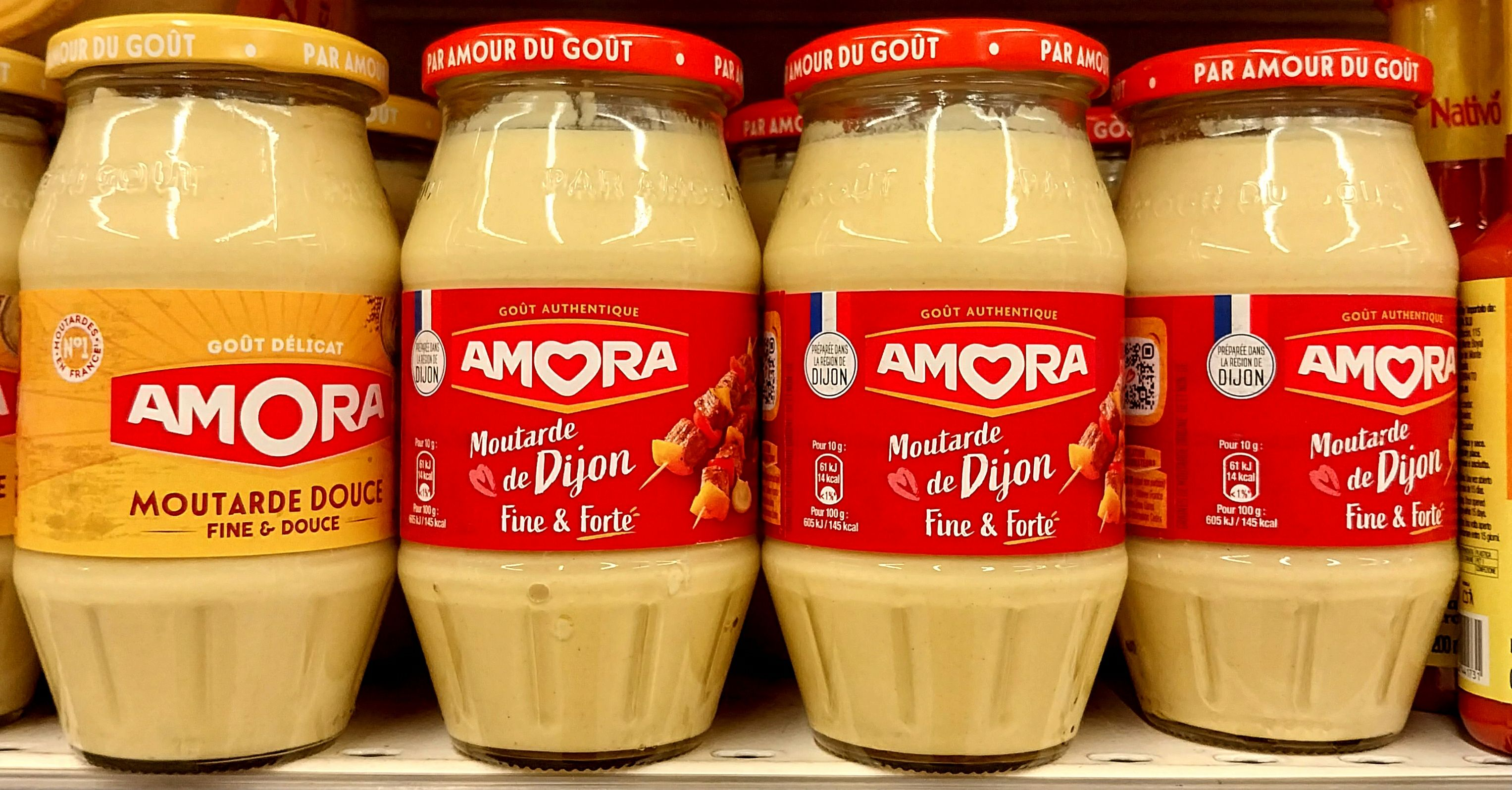
Dijon mustard

The company operates two major brands: Amora and Maille. The Amora brand sells mustard, ketchup, bouillon, salad dressing, and seasonings. The Maille brand sells mustard, sauces, olive oil, and vinegar.

Its mustard is considered a strong and pungent one, compared to other Dijon mustards.

== Controversies ==
In August 2018, foodwatch (a European advocacy group focused on consumer rights) accused Amora of false advertising for its "Mustard Vinaigrette" salad dressing product, which was found to contain only 0.7% mustard and mustard seeds not sourced from Dijon.

== See also ==
- List of mustard brands
- List of brand name condiments
