= Turun sinappi =

Finnish mustard brand established 1926

Turun sinappi (Swedish name: Åbo senap) is a mustard made in Finland. It is often served with makkara (i.e. sausage).

Turun sinappi was first launched by Turku foodstuffs manufacturer Jalostaja in 1948. The mustard got its name after the Finnish city of Turku. It is sold in yellow 250 g tubes. It consists of dark yellow finely ground mustard and various other spices. There are four types of Turun sinappi: Mieto (mild) with a green cap, Väkevä (strong) with a red cap, Tulinen (fiery) with a black cap and Linnan sinappi (Mustard of the Castle) with blue cap. The logo sports the profile of Turku castle. The most popular type is the "red" range (Väkevä), which has a distinctive taste.

There was a controversy over the name in the early 2000s, when Unilever bought out the original manufacturer.

When the brand was bought, the production was moved to Uppsala in Sweden. In 2008, the production was moved again, to Poland. In 2014, the production was moved back to Finland.

The foodstuffs manufacturer Lunden, based in Turku and current owner of the Jalostaja brand, started producing mustard with the same recipe as Turun sinappi, named Auran Sinappi after the river that flows through the city. Now Auran sinappi has captured 25% of the market share.

Turun sinappi is remembered for its TV commercials, which at a time were frequently shown on Finnish TV. The slogan was "Kahta en vaihda", meaning "There are two things that I'll never change". The commercials usually featured someone saying "There are two things that I'll never change. One of them is Turun sinappi and the other is xxx", with the "other thing" varying from time to time, sometimes not being mentioned at all. A schoolyard parody of the slogan is "There are two things I'll never change: my socks".

== See also ==
- List of mustard brands
- List of brand name condiments
- Unox
