= Keen's =

Australian brand of mustard and curry powder

Keen's is a brand of seasoning products produced by McCormick Foods Australia, the Australian branch of the American food company McCormick & Company, and by McCormick Canada in Canada. The Keen's brand has a long history and remains a common item in kitchens throughout Australia. The brand is particularly well known for its distinctive yellow and orange tins.

Keen's Mustard Powder is composed of finely crushed mustard seeds and is sold in 50g or 100g tins.

Keen's Traditional Curry Powder is a blend of turmeric, coriander, salt, fenugreek, black pepper, chilli powder, rice flour, allspice and celery. Keen's Curry is available in 60g or 120g tins. Keen's Curry is popular within the Aboriginal Australian community.

== Keen's Mustard ==
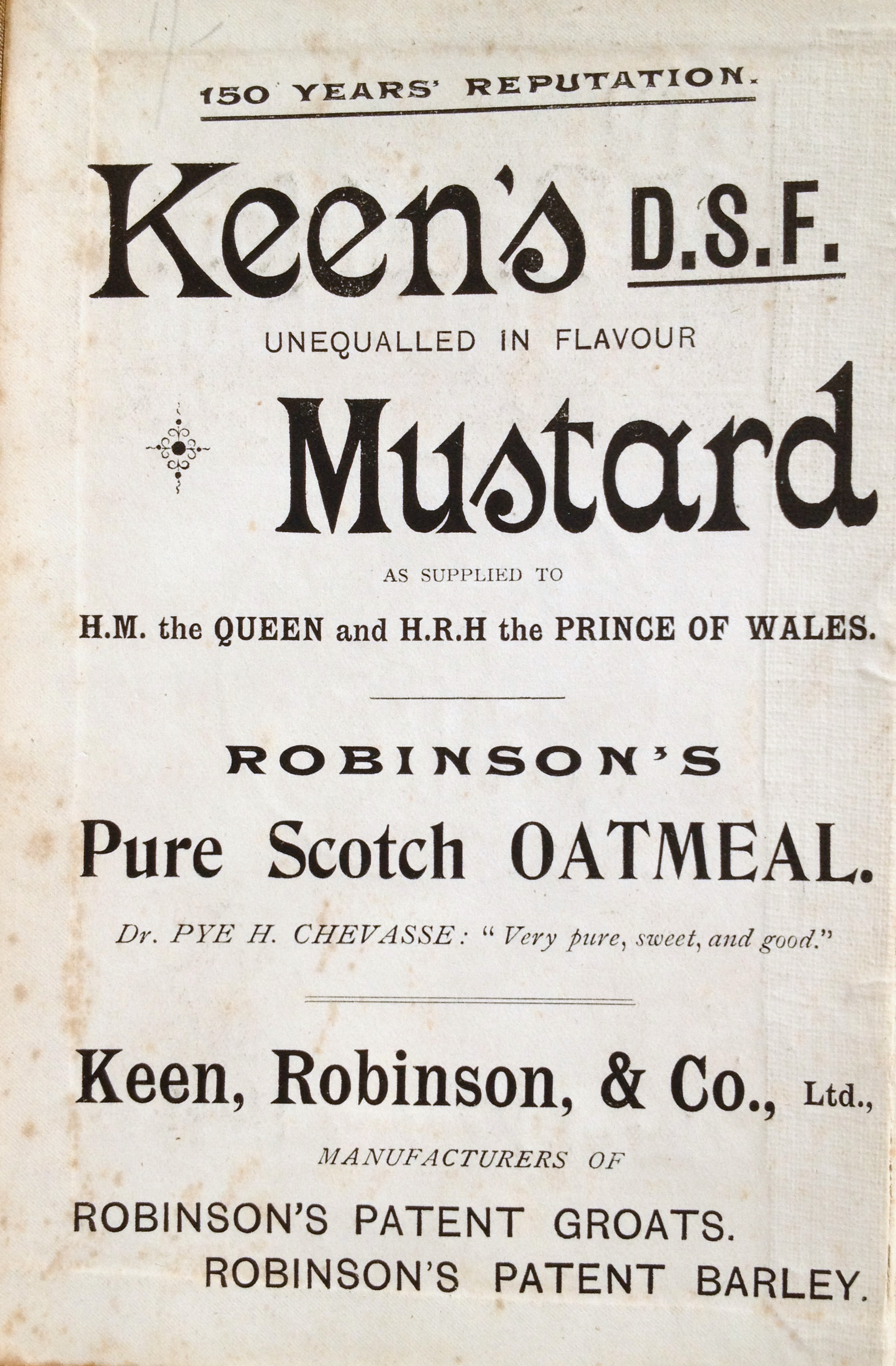
Keen, Robinson, & Co. advertisement, London, 1894

Keen's Mustard has a history extending back to the 18th century. The first mustard factory in London was opened by Messrs Keen & Sons at Garlick Hill in 1742, and in the 1890s the chimes of the Royal Exchange, set to the then well-known song 'The Roast Beef of Old England', could be heard, during a lull in the traffic, at Keen's factory. Part of the factory was sealed off for manufacture of washing blue, because everything, including the workers, bore a shade of blue. Mustard tins too were made, and there was a penny tin packing room.

Thomas Keen was born in Camberwell, south London, in 1801, but the family subsequently moved to Croydon, Surrey, and ran the 311-acre Welcomes Farm at nearby Coulsdon. In 1825 Thomas married Harriett Toulmin, whose family lived at The Elms, 61 High Street, and the couple moved in 1831.

In 1862, Thomas Keen died on 17 February at the age of 61. In that same year, Keen & Sons amalgamated with Robinson & Belville, manufacturers of patented groats and barley, to become Keen Robinson & Company. In 1903, Keen Robinson & Company was acquired by J & J Colman, the mustard producer based in Norwich. Colman's merged with Reckitt & Sons in 1938, becoming Reckitt & Colman.

In the 1930s, the Keen's Mustard Club was created. Members received a Mustard Club Badge in the shape of a mustard pot and a booklet entitled "Inner Secrets of the Mustard Club".

In the 1940s, the versatility of mustard was promoted with the formula for a mustard footbath appearing on the back of Keen's tins: "one of mustard, two of flour, leave it on for half an hour".

In 1995, Unilever purchased the food side of Reckitt & Colman. Reckitt & Colman retained the Colman part of its name and continued to make mustard – the American mass mustard called French's. Outside of the UK, in places such as Canada and Australia, Colman's still sells its mustard under the Keen's name.

In 1998, Keen's Mustard was bought by McCormick Foods Australia. Keen's asked Australians to search their homes for nostalgic Keen's memorabilia. The search uncovered historic advertisements and even an original mustard powder tin dating back to 1904. In 2000, Keen's Mustard took the memorabilia on tour to share with the rest of Australia.

== Keen's Curry ==
In 1841, 22-year-old carpenter Joseph Keen (son of Thomas Keen) sailed to Australia from Britain with his new wife, Johanna. Following Johanna's death in Sydney in 1843, Joseph left for Van Diemen's Land. There he met and married Annie (Nancy) Burrows and they had 16 children – nine daughters and seven sons. Joseph and Annie settled at Browns River, Kingston, south of Hobart, where they established a bakery, small manufacturing outlet and a general store. Here Joseph produced and sold his own sauces and condiments including his own blend of curry powder.

Within a decade, Joseph's curry powder was known throughout the colony and his produce was winning awards: he received a medal for his spice mix at the 1866 Inter-Colonial Exhibition in Melbourne and an honourable mention for his spicy sauce at the 1879 Sydney International Exhibition.

In 1915, after both Joseph and Annie had died, the couple's sixth daughter Louisa and her husband Horace Watson took over the family's curry-powder business. Horace was reported to be a colourful character, and daringly transformed land at the foothills of Mount Wellington, overlooking Hobart, into a large advertising sign: using heavy stones painted white, he formed the words 'Keen's Curry' in letters 15 metres high. Public uproar resulted, but Horace won the right to use the land as an advertising sign.

In a university prank in 1926, the letters briefly read 'Hell's Curse', and students altered it again in 1962 to promote a theatre production. In 1994 the landmark read 'No Cable Car' as a protest against a proposed development. However the sign has been restored after every change.

While well known in Tasmania, Keen's Curry Powder began to receive national attention in 1954 when the formula and rights were sold to Reckitt & Colman Australia Ltd (currently, Reckitt Benckiser (Australia) Pty Limited) – more than a century after Joseph set sail from England.

Reckitt & Colman Australia had long been the manufacturers of a different product – Keen's Mustard.

In 1998, both the Keen's Mustard and Curry brands were acquired by McCormick Foods Australia Pty Ltd.

== See also ==
- List of mustard brands
