= Lewis J. Minor =

American chef and businessman (1914–2002)

Lewis Joseph Minor
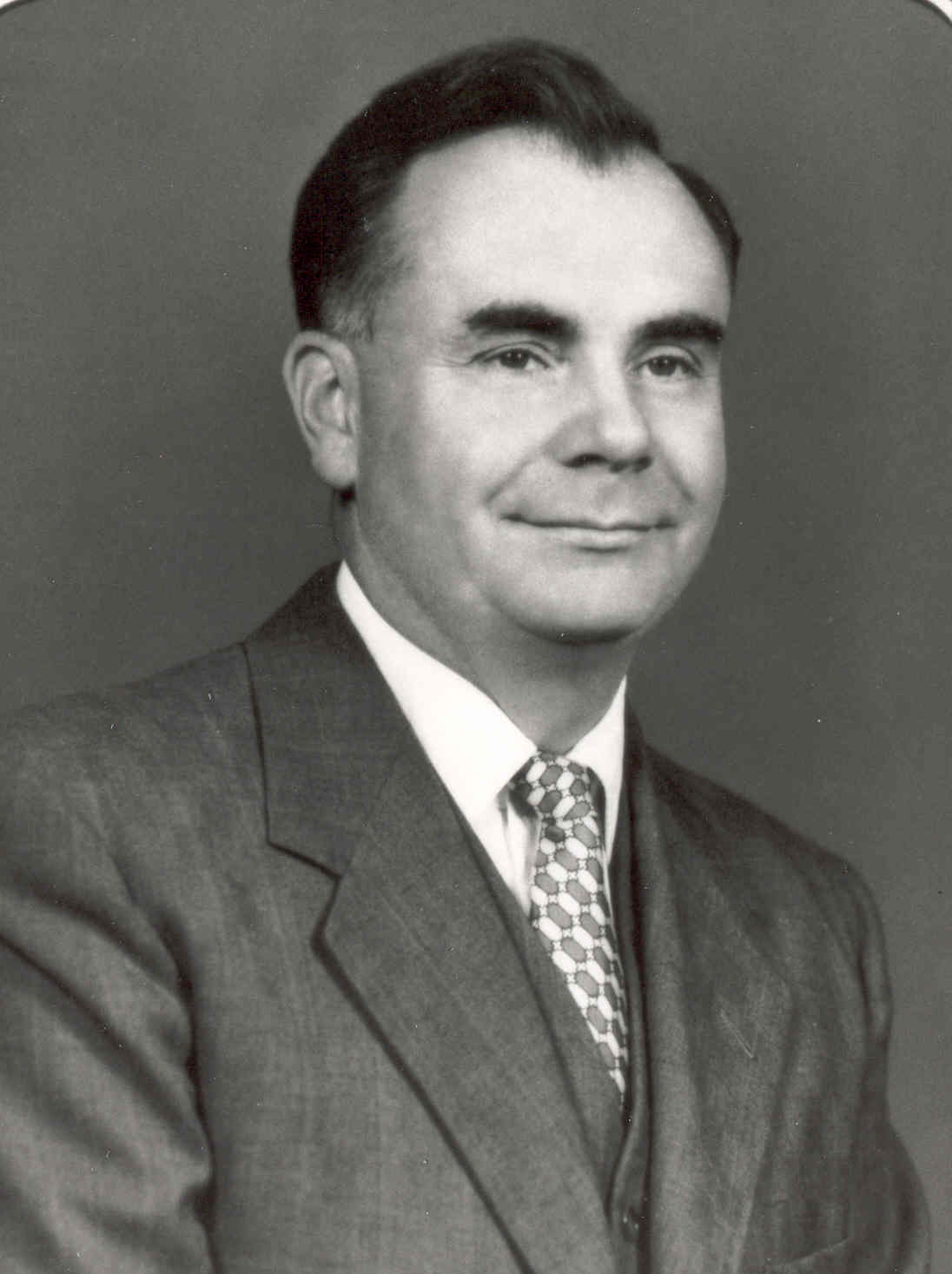
- Born: 24 October 1914; Harbor Beach, Michigan
- Died: 17 March 2002 (aged 87); Lansing, Michigan
- Education: Michigan State University

Lewis Joseph Minor (October 24, 1914 – March 17, 2002) was an American inventor, food scientist, businessman and philanthropist who founded the L. J. Minor Corporation in 1951 and is credited as one of the earliest supporters for elevating the chef title from domestic to professional in the Department of Labor's Dictionary of Occupational Titles.

== Early life ==
Lewis Joseph Minor was born in Harbor Beach, Michigan to Kathleen Mary Hill, who immigrated from County Tipperary, Ireland and Newell Wellington Minor, an analytical chemist and combustion engineer for Ford Motor Company. Minor attended schools in nearby Highland Park. At the age 18, he graduated from St. Benedict High School and began working for the Donahue Varnish Company. Minor graduated with honors from Highland Park Junior College in 1937. He then enrolled at Michigan State College where he graduated with a bachelor's degree in Chemistry in 1939. Earlier that same year, he married Ruth Eloise Angell of Lansing, Michigan. Minor went on to receive his master's degree in Analytical Chemistry from Wayne State University in 1944, and his Ph.D. in Food Science from Michigan State University.

== Career ==
Minor joined La Choy Food Company and served as Technical Director from 1939 to 1942. In this role, he was responsible for product control, process development, and new product research. From 1942-44, he was a Research Associate in the Owens-Illinois Research Center and Research Director and Vice President for McKay-Davis Company from 1944-46.

At McKay-Davis, Minor's team earned a U.S Army Quartermaster Corps citation for an "outstanding contribution to the defense effort" for work on developing and producing a unique, flavorful bouillon powder and chocolate bar used in World War II "K" rations.

In 1947, he became Technical Director for Huron Milling Company in charge of developing new applications for monosodium glutamate, hydrolyzed vegetable protein and edible wheat starch.

Minor returned to Michigan State University as a Visiting Professor of Food Science at The School of Hotel, Restaurant and Institutional Management. His Visiting Professor position, which he retained for 20 years leading up to his retirement, enabled him to teach, to continue food science research, and to pursue his personal and philanthropic interests directed toward raising the status of American chefs. Minor and his wife helped the school through their financial support for the Chef’s position in 1982. They began the $1 million endowment in 1988 for the Chef de Cuisine position at the school. Minor and his wife have been called the “Supreme Benefactors” of the school, having also endowed the Michael L. Minor Master of Science in Foodservice Management at Michigan State University in 1996.

== L.J. Minor Corporation ==
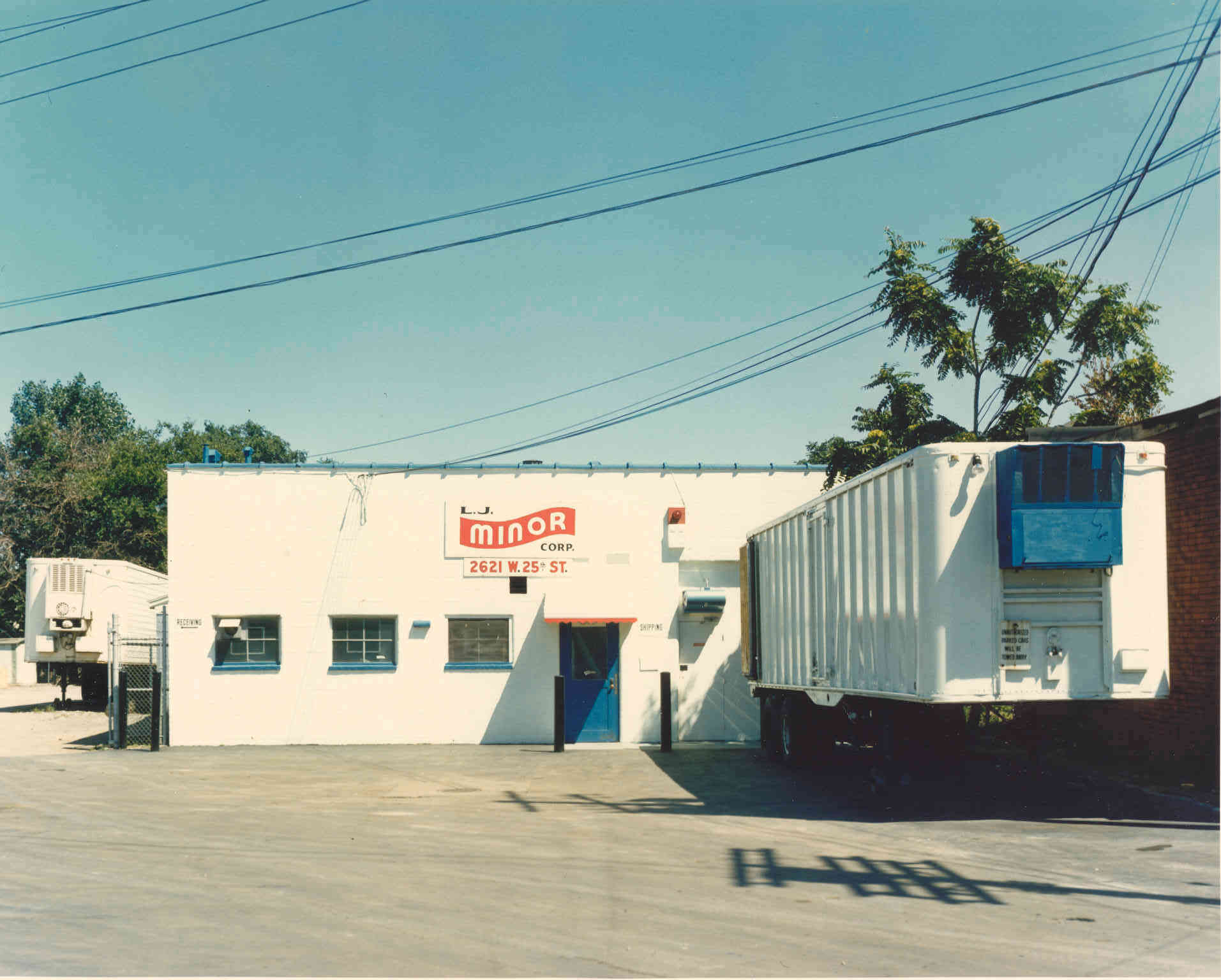
MINOR'S building, Cleveland (1962)

In 1950, Minor decided to start his own business. He moved to Cleveland, Ohio with his wife and six small children. In January, 1951 he formed the L. J. Minor Corporation with $6,000 capital and two partners. Minor rented an 18' x 20' space in a commercial warehouse and began to single-handedly manufacture and sell his unique flavor concentrates. He chose to name these concentrates 'food bases' to set them apart from the soup bases then used by chefs to boost flavor in stocks and broths made by the traditional, lengthy stockpot method.

Minor's new flavor bases included concentrates of freshly cooked meat, poultry, seafood, and vegetables which enabled food service operators to add natural food flavors to a wide variety of menu items. Minor's flavors also enabled faster preparation of stocks and broths with less expense than before.

In late 1951, Minor bought out his partners and concentrated on product development and quality control. The L.J. Minor Corporation was the first manufacturer to hire a chef to sell food products. In 1959, after years of hard work building his business, Minor decided to devote less time to active business management and more time to teaching. Minor attended night classes at Baldwin Wallace College in Berea, Ohio, to obtain his teaching certification, and taught high school chemistry in suburban Rocky River High School. In 1961, Minor took a leave of absence from his company to enroll in Michigan State University's food science department graduate program. In 1964, he attained his Ph.D. with his published thesis entitled "Identification of Some Chemical Components in Chicken Flavor."

Present-day MINOR'S logo

In 1983, L. J. Minor sold the L. J. Minor Corporation to Nestle, the world's largest nutrition, health and wellness company.

=== Elevating American chef status ===
In 1974, during the American Culinary Federation Convention in Cleveland, Ohio, a keynote speaker declared that European governments honored Executive Chefs; however, in America chefs were officially listed in the domestic category with maids and butlers. This speaker called on the attendees of the convention to change this official view. To support the effort, Minor contributed significantly from his own company’s funds as a sign of gratitude to the entire culinary profession.

After two years of efforts, in January, 1977, officials from the Department of Labor, L.J. Minor Corporation, and the American Culinary Federation successfully advanced the listing of Executive Chef in the Dictionary of Official Titles from the "Services" category to the "Professional, Technical, and Managerial Occupations" category.

== Personal life ==
Minor and his wife Ruth had 8 children. Minor died March 17, 2002.
