= Bertman Foods Company =

Wholesale grocery business

Bertman Foods Company, founded as Joseph Bertman, Inc., is a wholesale grocery business which began in the 1920s in Cleveland, Ohio. It is best known for a formulation of mustard that became iconic in Cleveland, Ohio, spawning two brands, Bertman Original Ball Park Mustard and Stadium Mustard.

The company sold pickles, salad dressings, spices, coffees, teas, and canned and dried foods products to schools, hospitals, and other large-scale food operations. His company supplied mustard to League Park (then the home of the Cleveland Indians) and later to Cleveland Stadium. Bertman invented his spicy brown mustard in 1921.

Bertman's mustard, under the family label, is served at Progressive Field and Quicken Loans Arena in Cleveland, and is distributed retail in supermarkets and online through the company's website.

== History ==
Joseph "Joe" Bertman began the business in his twenties with a partner in a garage at the Bertman home at E. 147th near Kinsman, where spices and pickles were processed and packaged. The partner was bought out during the first few years of the business. Bertman expanded his sales territory from Cleveland to Pittsburgh, Pennsylvania. After WWII he had negotiated exclusive distribution rights to many food products with a fleet of trucks and a large sales force.

The company moved to 653 E. 103rd by the mid-1930s, and changed its name to Bertman Pickle Co.. Not too shortly after that, the company moved again, this time to 2180 E. 76th. The company changed its name to Bertman Foods Company, which is now located at 7777 Grand Avenue in Cleveland.
