= Dijon mustard =

Type of mustard

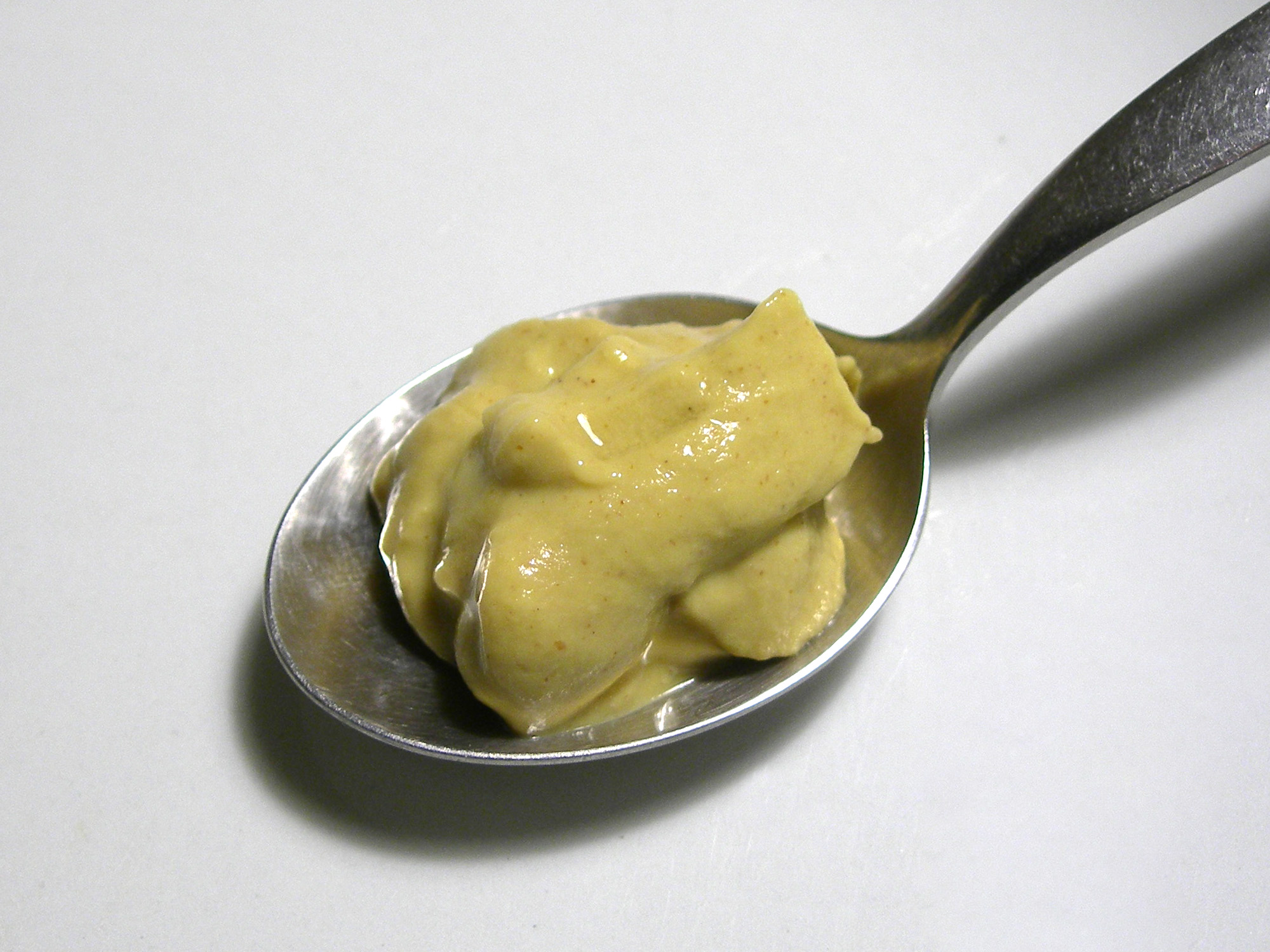
- A teaspoon of Dijon mustard
- Type: Condiment
- Place of origin: France
- Region or state: Burgundy
- Main ingredients: Mustard seeds, white wine or wine vinegar, water, salt
- Similar dishes: Creole mustard, kasundi

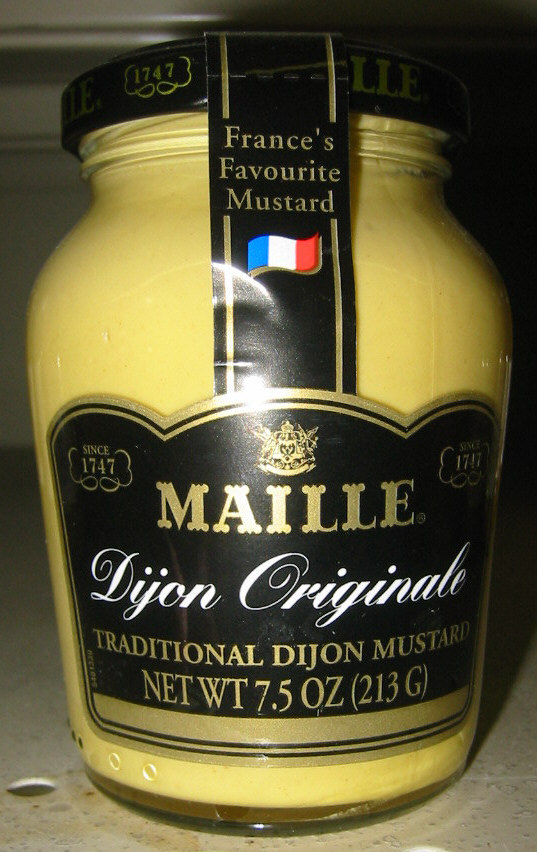
A jar of Maille brand Dijon mustard

Dijon mustard (French: moutarde de Dijon) is a traditional mustard from France. It is named after the city of Dijon in Burgundy, which was the center of mustard making in the late Middle Ages and was granted exclusive rights in France in the 17th century. First used in 1336 for the table of King Philip VI, it assumed its current form in 1856 when Jean Naigeon of Dijon replaced the vinegar usually used in prepared mustard with verjuice, the acidic juice of unripe grapes.

The main ingredients are brown mustard seeds (Brassica juncea) and a mixture of white wine, vinegar, water, and salt designed to imitate the original verjuice. It can be used as an accompaniment to all meats, or mixed with other ingredients to make a sauce.

== Commercial production ==
In 2008, multinational packaged goods company Unilever, which had several mustard plants in Europe, closed the Amora manufacturing plant. Since July 15, 2009, Amora's Dijon mustard is no longer manufactured and packaged in the town of Dijon, but in the neighbouring town of Chevigny-Saint-Sauveur. The Grey Poupon mustard brand available in the United States originated in Dijon in 1866.

=== 2022 shortage in France ===
France requires 35,000 tonnes of mustard seed to make Dijon mustard and 80% of the seed is imported from Canada, mainly from Alberta and Saskatchewan where most of Canada's mustard seeds are grown. Canadian production experienced a smaller crop in 2022 caused by a heatwave. The 2022 drought resulted in halving its usual harvest. The 2022 shortage was exacerbated by consumer stockpiling.

== Geographical indications ==
Dijon mustard does not have a protected geographical indication (PGI). A 1937 decree ruled that "Dijon mustard" can be used as generic designation and has no link to a specific terroir. However, "moutarde de Bourgogne" (a variant of Dijon mustard from the Bourgogne region) has a PGI, and its seeds have to be produced in Bourgogne.

== See also ==
- List of condiments
- List of mustard brands
