= Stadium Mustard =

American mustard brand

A bottle of Stadium Mustard shown as packaged for retail sale.

The Authentic Stadium Mustard (also known as "Stadium Mustard") is the trademarked name of a brown mustard popular in Northeast Ohio, particularly in Cleveland. The Authentic Stadium Mustard is sold at food retail stores and has been a concession item at over 150 stadiums and arenas throughout its history.

== History ==
In 1969, David Dwoskin, a sales representative of Bertman's company in the northeast Ohio area, formed the Davis Food Company to make "The Brown Mustard" served at the Cleveland Municipal Stadium available for retail sales in supermarkets. In 1971, David Foods registered the name "The Authentic Stadium Mustard". In 1982, Davis Food Company obtained exclusive rights to sell to both wholesale and retail markets as well as stadiums, arenas and other venues. In the early 1980s there was a disagreement between Bertman and Dwoskin. Dwoskin produced the original mustard under the Stadium Mustard brand through his own company. The Bertman Family continues to sell its version of the mustard through its Bertman Foods Company.

Dwoskin told Cleveland.com that his mustard is served in 150 stadiums in the United States including Huntington Bank Field and Rocket Arena.

Both mustards are sold in grocery stores, specialty food shops, and online. A 2011 blind tasting revealed strong similarities between the two brands, with Bertman, which has some sugar in it, being a bit sweeter, and Stadium being a bit more spicy.

== Style ==
Stadium Mustard is made with only brown mustard seed, has no preservatives, sugar, fat or fillers. It is a mildly spicy brown mustard more similar to European mustards than American deli-style brown mustards. Stadium Mustard is unique in that it is homogeneously brown in color, compared to traditional coarse-ground brown deli mustards, which are typically mottled in appearance and may feature both yellow and brown mustard seeds.

== See also ==
- List of mustard brands
