= Maille (company) =

French mustard manufacturer

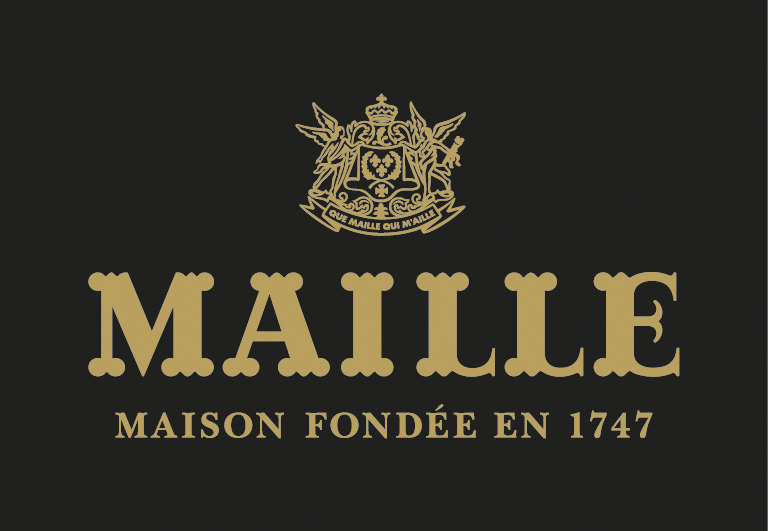

Maille is a brand of condiments, which originated as a vinegar manufactury in Marseille, France, in 1723. Today it is a subsidiary of multinational consumer goods company Unilever, which produces the brand's mustard at plants globally and markets cornichons, stoneware, salad dressings, kitchen gifts, and cooking oil under the Maille name in company stores, through global retail distribution agreements, and online since 2007.

Maille also markets traditional dijon mustard and flavored variants through dedicated Maison Maille shops in Dijon, London (2013), New York City (2014), Paris (2015), and Bordeaux (2015), as well as in-store concessions in Chicago, Portland, and San Francisco.

In North America, the Maille Dijon mustard distributed in America is made in Canada while the Maille Dijon mustard distributed in Canada is imported from France. Maille is also exported from France to other European countries such as Poland as well as countries such as Singapore and Australia.

== History ==
In 1747, second generation vinegar-maker Antoine-Claude Maille opened a boutique called La Maison Maille on the rue Saint-André des Arts in Paris and became supplier to the court of Louis XV. His father, also named Antoine-Claude, had become famous during the 1720s for recommending vinegar as a treatment for the plague.

In 1760, Maille was named official vinegar supplier to the courts of Austria and Hungary. In 1769, King Louis XVI granted him a license as “ordinary distiller-vinegar-maker” and two years later he was granted a charter as distiller-vinegar-maker to Empress Catherine II of Russia.

Maille sold his business to his associate André-Arnoult Acloque in 1800 and died in 1804. His son Robert and Alcoque's son Andre-Gabriel became business partners in 1819, and were appointed distillers to the King and sole suppliers to the house of King Louis XVIII in 1821. Maille became vinegar-maker for Charles X in 1826, the King of England in 1830, and King Louis Philippe in 1836. A Maille boutique opened in the Burgundy region in 1845.

In 1885, Maille was purchased by Maurice Grey of Grey Poupon. In 1930, Maille was purchased by entrepreneur Baron Philippe de Rothschild. The company's slogan, Que Maille qui m’aille, or "Maille alone suits me", was created in 1931. In 1936, the brand advertised itself by spelling out the word ‘MAILLE’ in lights on Parisian rooftops. This scene was depicted in a cinema advert called Quand on n'en a pas. These campaigns ended after the outbreak of the Second World War.

In 1952, Rothschild sold the brand to André Ricard and Joseph Poupon, deputy CEO of Grey Poupon. Maille and Grey Poupon then joined forces and began marketing in supermarkets.

The company began producing Maille whisky glasses in 1988 and launched its trademark Fleur de Lys jar a year later. It started selling balsamic vinegar in 1991.

In 1996, the firm celebrated the 250th anniversary of its founding by opening a shop on the Place de la Madeleine in Paris. It sells packaged mustards, oils and vinegars as well as mustard straight from the pump.

Maille was sold to Paribas Affaires Industrielles in 1997 and was purchased by Unilever in 2000. In 2011, the company introduced a Dijon mustard with Chablis "1747", an aged balsamic vinegar and black truffle mustard.

== Products ==
In 1937, Dijon was granted the right to an Appellation Controlée, subjecting it to manufacturing regulations, and prescribing the method by which it may be called a Dijon mustard.

The company has produced condiments using other ingredients, including mango, red berries, tarragon and Cognac.

In 1996, Maille introduced limited-edition mustards delivered on tap from porcelain pumps, each based on a signature ingredient such as Chablis. They included a black truffle and Chablis mustard served in sandstone jars.
