= Three Little Pigs (company) =

American charcuterie company

Les Trois Petits Cochons
- Company type: Private
- Industry: Charcuterie
- Founded: 1975 in New York City, United States
- Founders: Alain Sinturel; Jean Pierre Pradié
- Area served: United States
- Products: Pâtés; Mousses; Terrines; Sausages; Charcuterie
- Website: http://3pigs.com/

Les Trois Petits Cochons also known as Three Little Pigs is an American charcuterie company founded in 1975 in Greenwich Village of New York City. The company was founded by French chefs Alain Sinturel and Jean-Pierre Pradié along with their business partner Harvey Millstein.

== History ==
Pradié and Sinturel met in the early 1970s. During a year long trip traveling through Africa the two met Harvey Millstein who would later become their business partner.

In 1975, the trio decided to open a charcuterie company as they did not have the funding to open a restaurant. Their original space was only 300 square feet.

In 1976, the company opened a second store. Three Little Pigs became known for its pâtés and catering business recognized by notable food critics such as James Beard, Mimi Sheraton and Craig Claiborne.

In 1988, Three Little Pigs opened a facility in Wilkes-Barre, Pennsylvania named House of Bricks to accommodate the increasing demand for its products as it became a nationally distributed brand by the 1990s.

Founded as Les Trois Petits Cochons, French for "Three Little Pigs," the company trademarked the name derived from the fairy-tale in 1996. Three Little Pigs celebrated its 40th year of business in 2015.

== Overview ==
Since 1975, the company has grown from a neighborhood take-out shop in Greenwich Village into a nationally distributed specialty food brand. Three Little Pigs makes hand-crafted pâté and charcuterie, such as mousses, terrines, hams, sausages and mustards, produced without the use of additives or preservatives.

Since its founding, the company has received 19 Sofi awards and in 2015, won a Cook's Illustrated award for its dijon mustard.
