= Brassica sinapis =

Brassica sinapis can refer to:

- Brassica sinapis Noulet, a synonym of Rhamphospermum nigrum (L.) Al-Shehbaz
- Brassica sinapis Vis., a synonym of Rhamphospermum arvense (L.) Andrz. ex Besser
