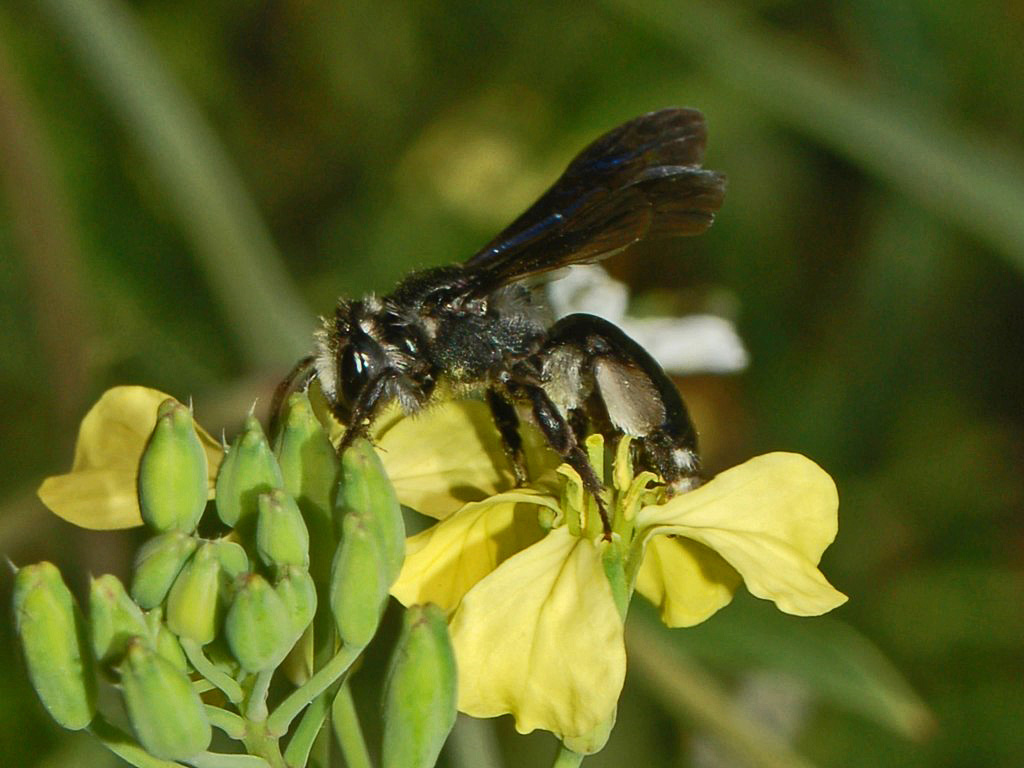
- Andrena agilissima - Female

Scientific classification
- Domain: Eukaryota
- Kingdom: Animalia
- Phylum: Arthropoda
- Class: Insecta
- Order: Hymenoptera
- Family: Andrenidae
- Genus: Andrena
- Species: A. agilissima

Binomial name
- Andrena agilissima (Scopoli, 1770)

= Andrena agilissima =

Species of bee

Andrena agilissima is a species of mining bee. They are present in most of Europe, the Near East and North Africa and can be found from April through July. Andrena agilissima is an oligolectic species, feeding only on the pollen of a few genera of Cruciferous vegetables (Brassicaceae species, such as Brassica napus, Brassica rapa, Raphanus raphanistrum, Barbarea vulgaris and Sinapis species).

== Taxonomy and phylogeny ==
A. agilissima is a member of the order Hymenoptera, which includes wasps, bees, and ants. It is in the family Andrenidae, and the subfamily Andreninae. The genus Andrena is one of the largest genera of bees and comprises the sand or solitary mining bees. It was first listed under the Apis genera, but in 1775, Fabricus described this genus along with 14 other species. Most Andrena bees are solitary and a few are communal.

== Description and identification ==
=== Description ===
A. agilissima is an oligolectic bee, meaning that they collect pollen from only a few flowering plants. The plants that A. agilissima collects from belong to the family Brassicaceae, which is usually wild radish and wild mustard. It has been shown that this species has a slight preference for the wild radish plant. The females nest on earth walls and collect pollen and nectar to feed the nest and are a pre-social springtime species. They are not known to go far from the nest, but they have been seen to forage about 300 meters away from their nesting site. There is a heightened amount of activity on foraging the wild radish flowers from 11:00 am to 1:00 pm.

=== Identification ===
The adults grow up to 13–15 millimetres (0.51–0.59 in) long, with females slightly larger than males. They have a shiny black body, with tufts of white velvety hairs on the facial fovea, on either side of the thorax, on the last abdominal tergites and the femora of the third pair of legs. The wings have bluish reflections.

== Distribution and habitat ==
Andrena agilissima is a southern and central European species of mining bee, recognizable by its bluish color, which is found from the Netherlands and Poland in the north south through the islands of the Mediterranean to North Africa, where it is widespread, and as far east as former Czechoslovakia, it is absent from Great Britain but does occur on the Channel Islands. It is a typical hollow way bee. A. agilissima needs a vertical surface to nest on and it typically feeds on flowers of plants in the mustard family for food. In Southern Germany, it collects its pollen from the wild mustard plant (Sinapis arvensis). This plant does not grow on vertical surfaces, but instead on fields. Therefore, the only way A. agilissima can forage on this plant is when it close to an area that it can use as a nesting site. Due to the changing agricultural landscape of many places, there have been fewer A. agilissima. It is now rare to find large nest aggregations, which also impacts its cuckoo bee Nomada metalthoracica. The cuckoo bee lays its eggs in the host nest. In south-west Germany, it has been attempted to change the way fields are ploughed and planted so that the bees can feed on these wild mustard plants. This has caused for A. agilissima to start to form meta populations, or a collection of smaller local populations that have local extinctions, colonizations, and sometimes dispersal between the populations. A. agilissima - like Osmia brevicornis - also feeds on Brassicaceae (mustard plants). There is a huge aggregation of this bee in Tuscany, Italy on an earth wall 2.5 m high and 6 m wide.

== Behavior ==
=== Mating ===
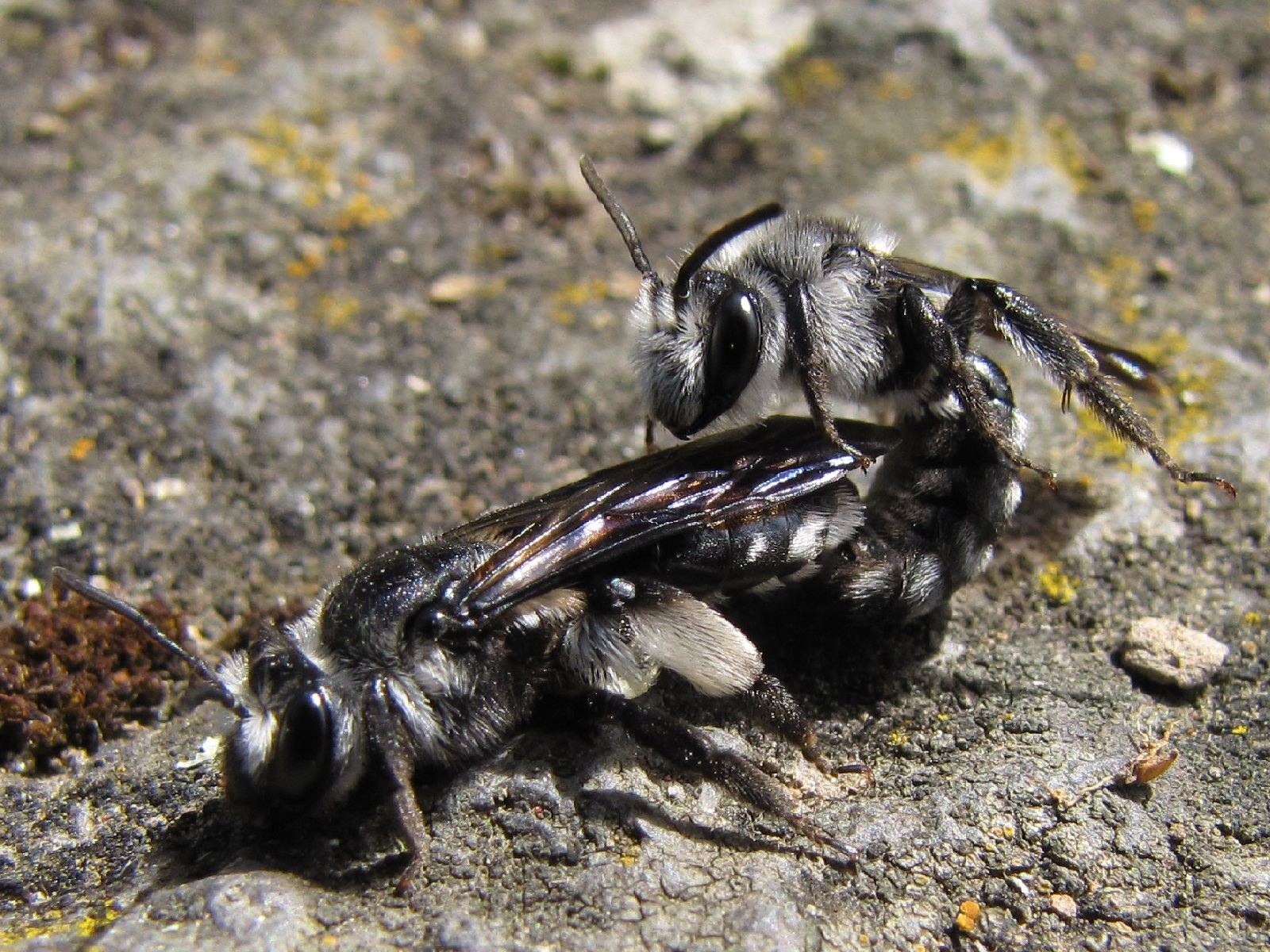
Mating of A. agilissima

The males search for virgin females while the females are collecting pollen from flowers. Bees in the genus Andrena are receptive to mating soon after leaving the nest as a mature bee, but are not receptive to male attention some time afterwards. Females mate only once. This bee is a communal bee where they are about 5-50 females sharing a nest entrance. It is found that most of the females have already mated before they permanently leave the nest. This is different from other bees in the genus which are usually solitary bees. Mating in the nest typically happens at the beginning of spring and mating at flowers happens at the end of the flight season. Being farther from the nest and mating will help lower the chance of inbreeding.

=== Size dimorphism ===
The males do not show discrete size dimorphism unlike other bees and all are able to fly. The females are bigger than the males with a slightly larger head size. There is no correlation of how big the female bee is compared to the amount of pollen that is being transferred. The carrying capacity is about 6.3 to 37.5% of its own body weight.

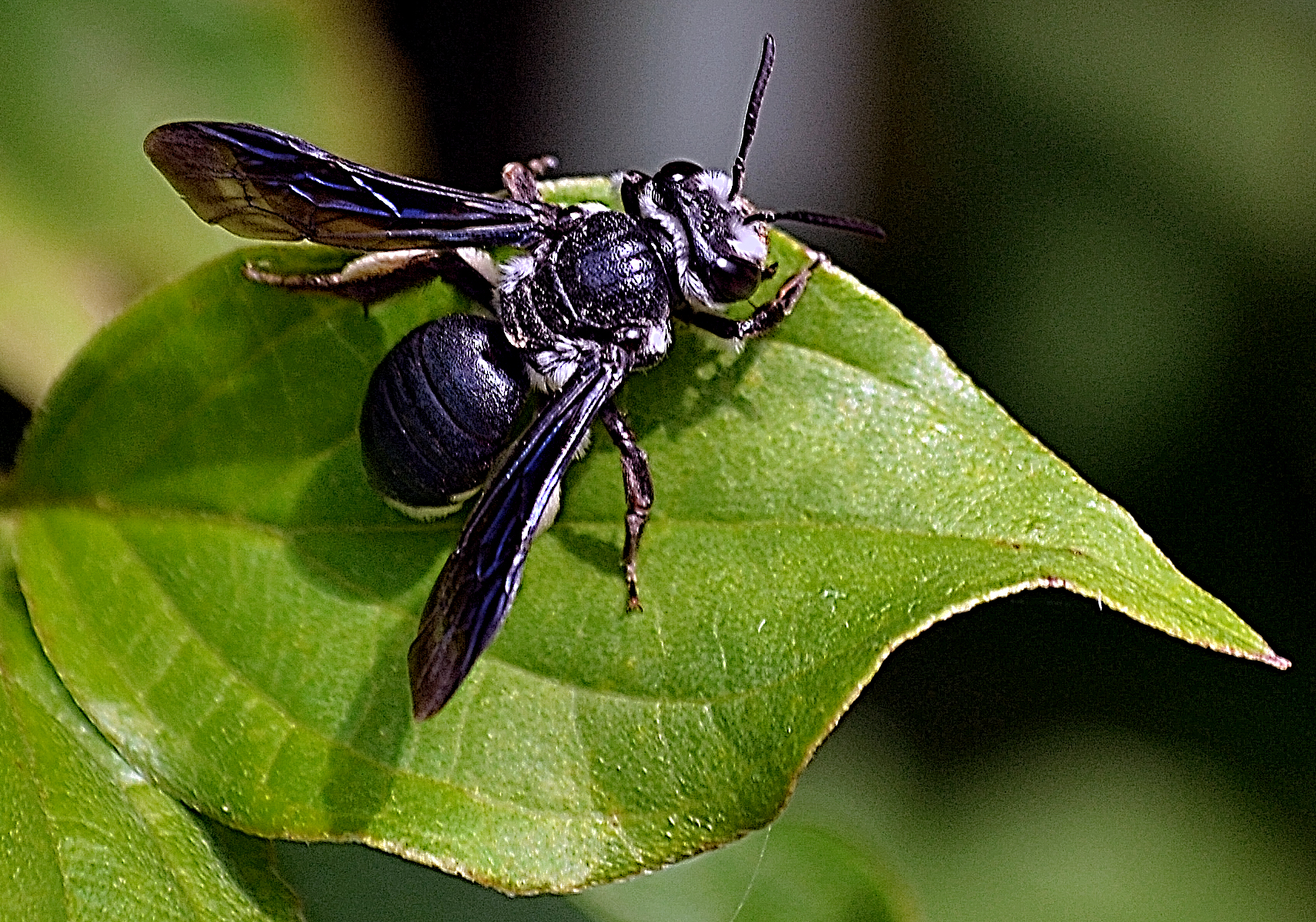
Andrena agilissima from above

=== Foraging ===
At the beginning of the spring season, the females start digging through their underground cells to collect pollen and nectar. The pollen that is collected is on the hind tibia, a large pollen-carrying brush, the hind femora, basket-like structure, and the trochanter, another basket called the floccus. The nectar is carried internally. Nectar load is increased in the afternoon but the amount of pollen per day does not change significantly.

=== Sex ratios ===
There is a sex ratio bias in A. agilissima, skewed towards having more females than males. This may be due to local mate competition which means that males essentially devalue each other by competing for the same females as mates. This is only really true for mating within the tunnels before emergence where they are closer to their nest and not as visible compared to when there is mating at flowers away from the nest.

=== Female–female interaction ===
There is no aggression when a bee finds her tunnel being temporarily used by another female that is getting to her nest. They are not seen to fight when there are other females waiting to use a tunnel while another is using it. Since this is a communal bee and not a social bee, there is also no overlap of generations and not much cooperation among the reproducing females.

=== Nesting behavior ===
A. agilissima is a communal bee that digs tunnels where the females stay. Many different bees use these tunnels instead of one bee per tunnel. This is also the place where males will go to have pre-emergence mating with the females. Over the years, the tunnels that the females create eventually will criss-cross more and more and the tunnels will start to interconnect. Even though there is sharing of tunnels, there is no evidence of females interacting with each other.

Having many females in a nest is beneficial because all females have been observed to create tunnels to help weaken the rock and allow them to go through different tunnels to reach their own broods. Additionally, there is a not a well-defined division of labor and there does not seem to be guards.

== Interaction with other species ==
=== Diet ===
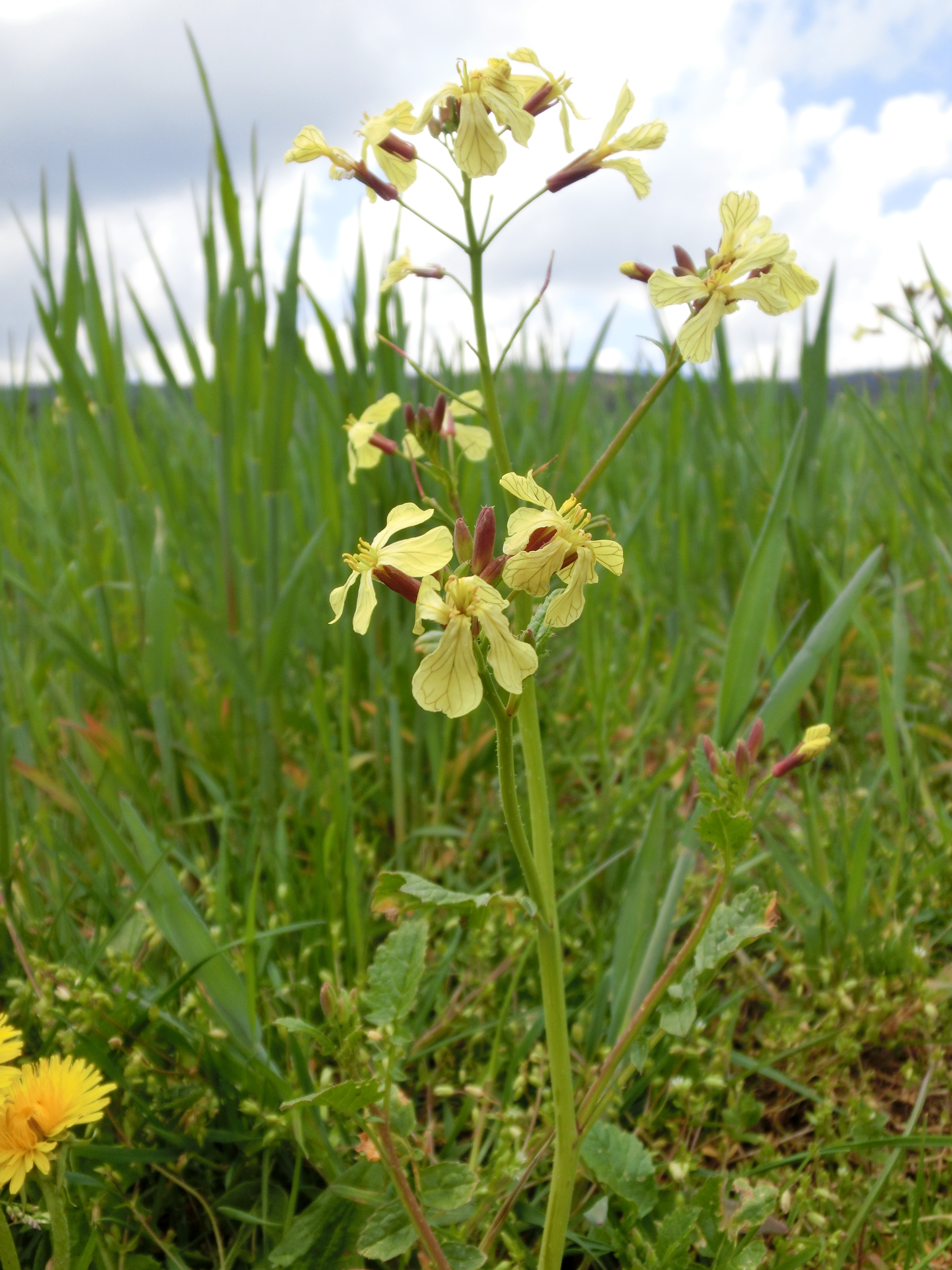
Raphanus raphanistrum

Females typically collect pollen and nectar from the flowers Raphanus raphanistrum and Sinapis arvensis. The females carry the pollen on their hind tibia and hind femora. The nectar is carried internally back to the nests and more is carried later in the afternoon than in the morning.

=== Parasites ===
==== Megaselia andrenae ====
The scuttle fly Megaselia andrenae is a parasite that affects A. agilissima. It is a kleptoparasite, meaning that it steals food and lays its eggs in cells of A. agilissima and is active all day around the nesting sites. Many of the females attach themselves to the bees, while the males wait around outside the entrance to the nests for the bee to re-emerge with the female fly.

==== Leucophora personata ====
Leucophora personata is another parasite that affects A. agilissima. These satellite flies are more active in the morning and sit close to the entrance of the host, eventually flying up to intercept the female bees coming into the tunnels. They then wait for the host to exit their nest and then they go into their cell to use up their nectar. If a bee notices that it is being followed, it moves in large zigzags to trick the fly away from its nest. If there is another bee in the tunnel, the fly will spend less time in the nest than it would if there was no other bee in the tunnel. This is beneficial for the bees to live communally since there is the chance that another bee will be at their tunnel discouraging the flies.
