= Andrena lativentris =

Scientific classification
- Kingdom: Animalia
- Phylum: Arthropoda
- Clade: Pancrustacea
- Class: Insecta
- Order: Hymenoptera
- Family: Andrenidae
- Subfamily: Andreninae
- Genus: Andrena
- Species: A. lativentris

Binomial name
- Andrena lativentris Timberlake, 1951

Species of bee

Andrena lativentris is a species of mining bee in the family Andrenidae. It is found in North America.
