= Megandrena =

Scientific classification
- Kingdom: Animalia
- Phylum: Arthropoda
- Class: Insecta
- Order: Hymenoptera
- Family: Andrenidae
- Subfamily: Andreninae
- Genus: Megandrena; Cockerell, 1927

Genus of bees

Megandrena is a genus of mining bees in the family Andrenidae. There are at least two described species in Megandrena.

== Species ==
These two species belong to the genus Megandrena:

- Megandrena enceliae (Cockerell, 1927) (encelia megandrena)
- Megandrena mentzeliae Zavortink, 1972
