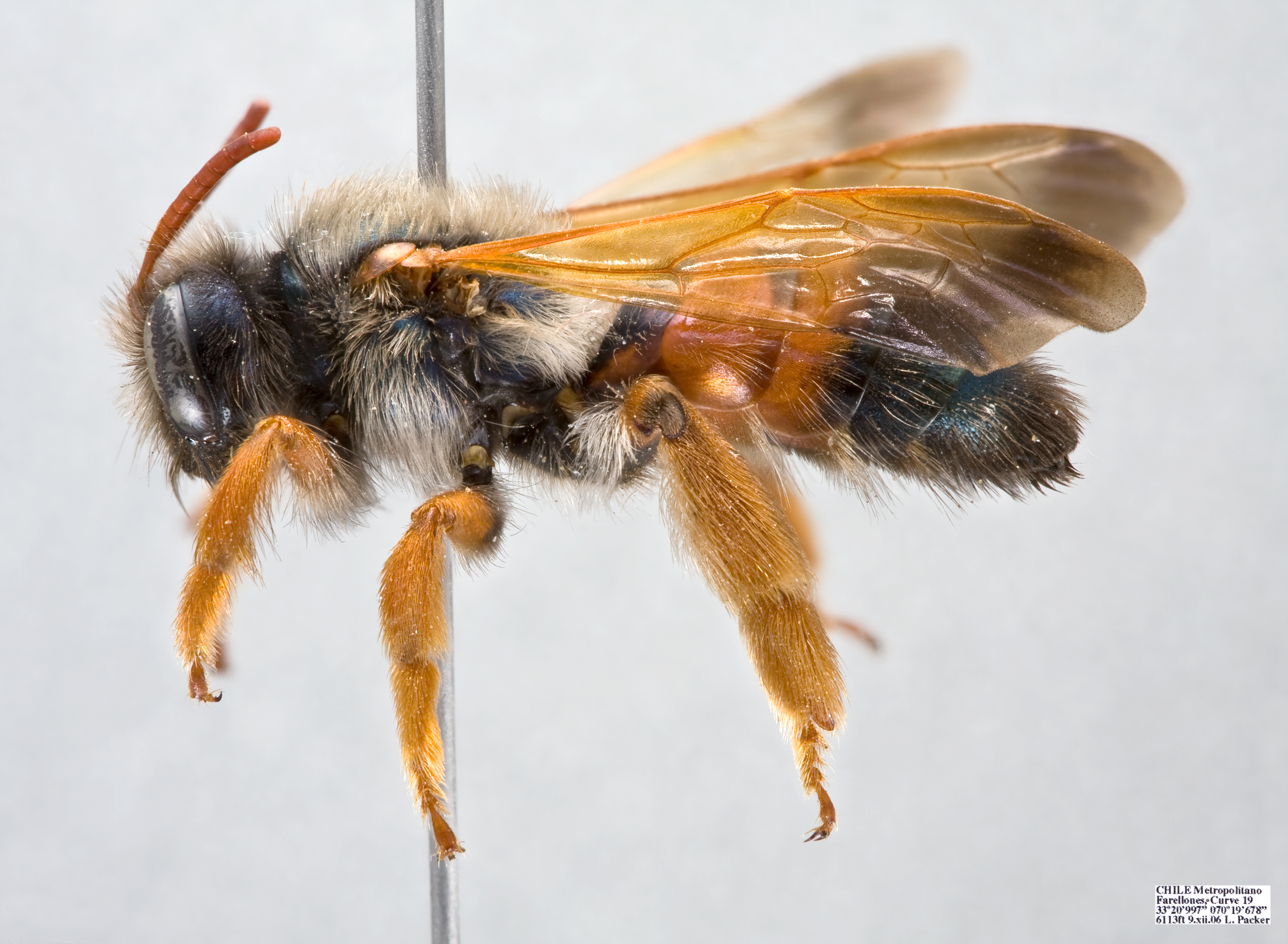
- Euherbstia excellens Female

Scientific classification
- Kingdom: Animalia
- Phylum: Arthropoda
- Class: Insecta
- Order: Hymenoptera
- Family: Andrenidae
- Subfamily: Andreninae
- Genus: Euherbstia; Friese, 1925
- Species: E. excellens

Binomial name
- Euherbstia excellens Friese, 1925

= Euherbstia =

Genus of bees

Euherbstia is a genus of mining bees in the family Andrenidae. The only species in this genus is Euherbstia excellens, which is endemic to Chile.

These bees have been observed to make nests in hard, compact soil, using cracks to enter the ground below. Females will make solitary nests. The female seeks out cracks in the ground, in which she digs a tunnel down to make her nest. She will repeatedly thump the walls of the tunnel with her abdomen, to make them more compact. Like all mining bees, they will create cells which they fill with pollen and eggs, closing them off until the larvae pupate and emerge the next year. Some larvae hibernate in a pupated state up to 2 years. This is probably because these bees live in an arid climate, where it is uncertain whether it will rain enough in a year to sustain the plants they need for food. As one generation of emerging adults might die because of drought, the next generation might survive, giving the species more chance of survival.

The name Euherbstia, (From Herbst, German) is a reference to the activity of these bees, which is in the months of October and November. Males, and females that have yet to build a nest, sleep overnight in convenient cracks in the soil. Foraging activity peaks around midday.

No cuckoo bee species seem to target the nests of Euherbstia.
