= Ancylandrena atoposoma =

Scientific classification
- Domain: Eukaryota
- Kingdom: Animalia
- Phylum: Arthropoda
- Class: Insecta
- Order: Hymenoptera
- Family: Andrenidae
- Genus: Ancylandrena
- Species: A. atoposoma

Binomial name
- Ancylandrena atoposoma (Cockerell, 1934)

Species of insect

Ancylandrena atoposoma is a species of mining bee in the family Andrenidae. It is found in Central America and North America.
