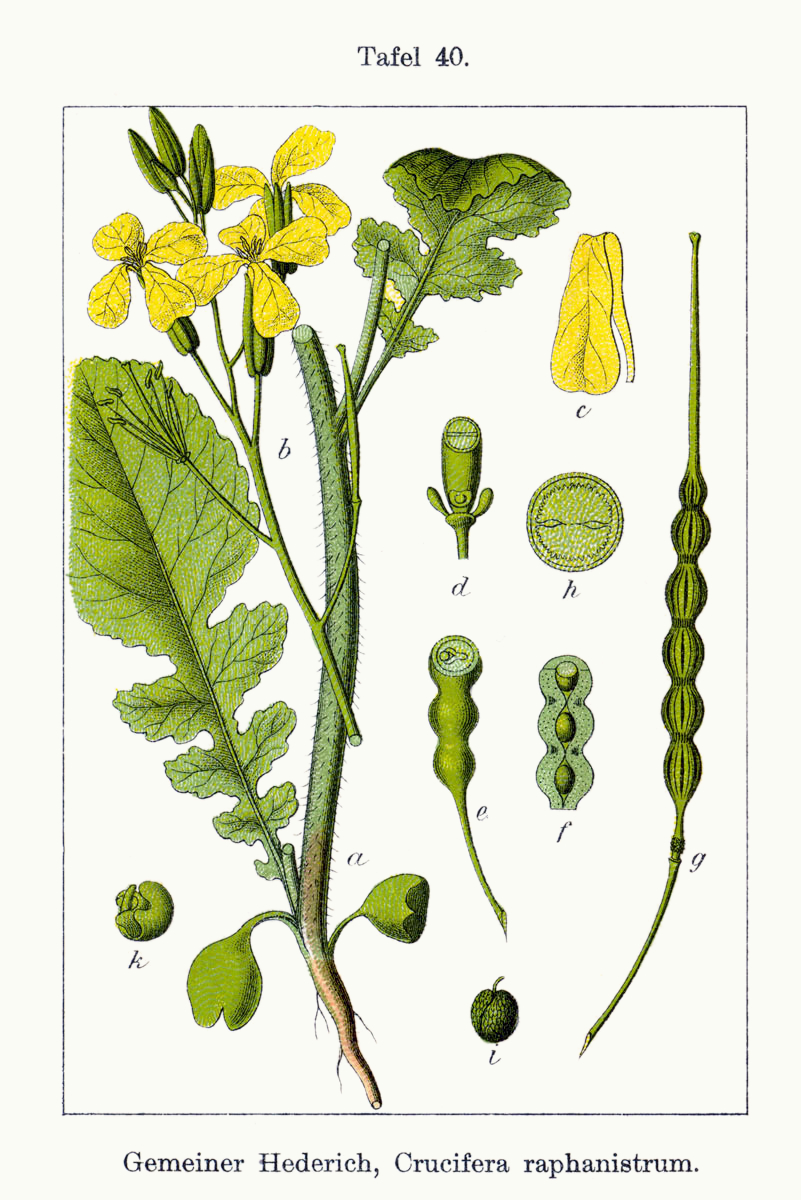

Scientific classification
- Kingdom: Plantae
- Clade: Embryophytes
- Clade: Tracheophytes
- Clade: Angiosperms
- Clade: Eudicots
- Clade: Rosids
- Order: Brassicales
- Family: Brassicaceae
- Genus: Raphanus
- Species: R. raphanistrum

Binomial name
- Raphanus raphanistrum L.

= Raphanus raphanistrum =

Species of flowering plant

Raphanus raphanistrum, also known as wild radish, white charlock or jointed charlock, is a flowering plant in the family Brassicaceae. The species is native to western Asia, Europe and parts of Northern Africa. It has been introduced into most parts of the world and is regarded as a habitat threatening invasive species in many areas, for example, Australia. It spreads rapidly and is often found growing on roadsides or in other places where the ground has been disturbed. The cultivated radish, widely used as a root vegetable, is sometimes considered to be one of its subspecies as Raphanus raphanistrum subsp. sativus.

== Description ==
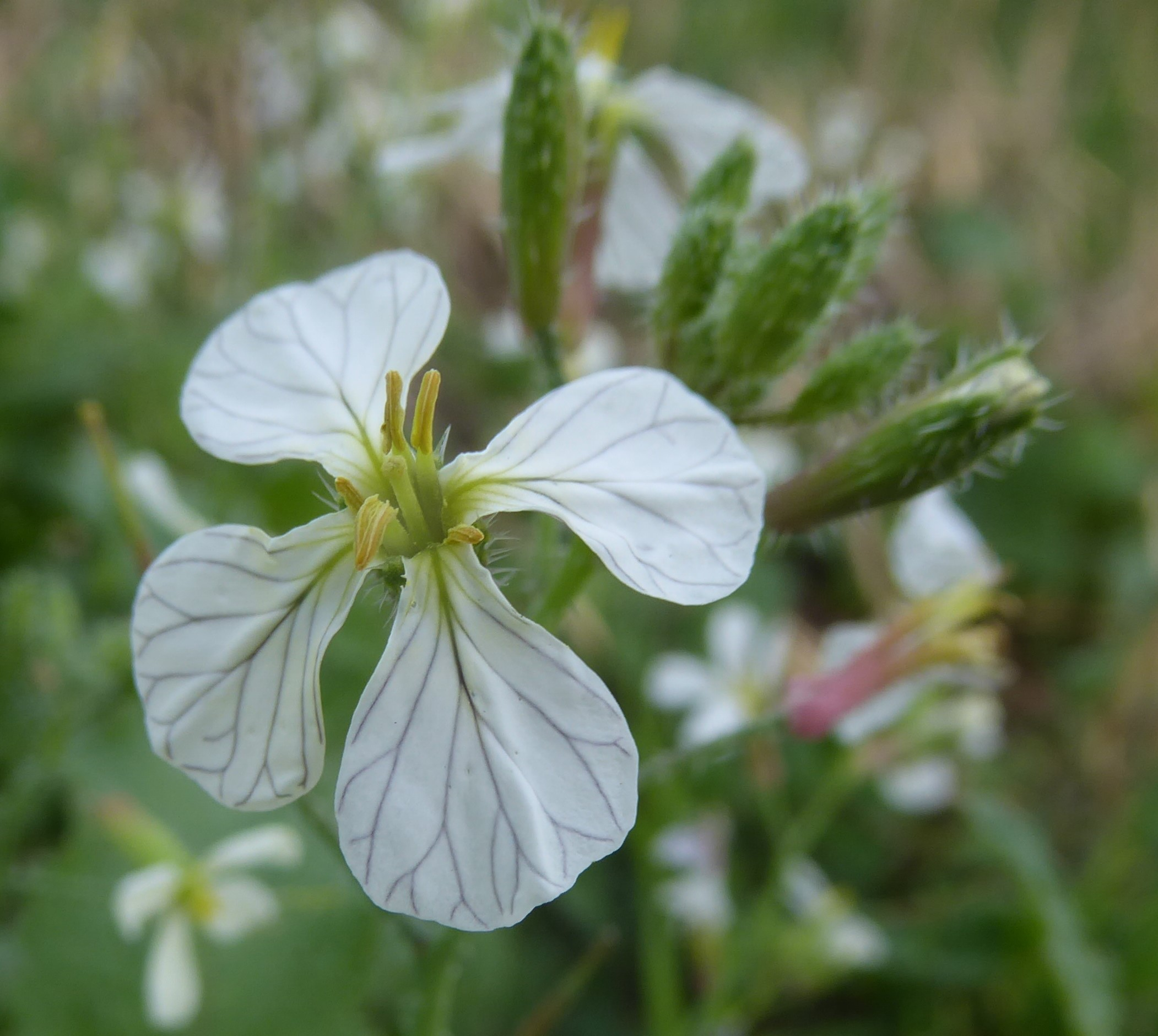
The petals have a characteristic pattern of veins

Wild radish is an annual that grows up to 75 centimetres (30 in) tall, variously branched to multi-stemmed, with a distinct slender taproot which does not swell like that of the cultivated radish. The stems are green and sometimes purple at the base and nodes, round in cross section and slightly ridged, and bristly-hairy all over. It has a basal rosette of pinnate leaves to 38 cm (15 in) long, with a 3-cm stalk (petiole) and a large rounded terminal lobe that has a undulate margin; the lateral lobes sometimes overlap the midrib. The stem leaves become progressively less lobed as they ascend, and more acutely serrated. Both the upper and lower surface of each leaf is roughly hairy, as are the leaf margins, which have minutely bulbous-based hairs projecting horizontally. The leaves have green or purple tips (hydathodes) on each tooth.

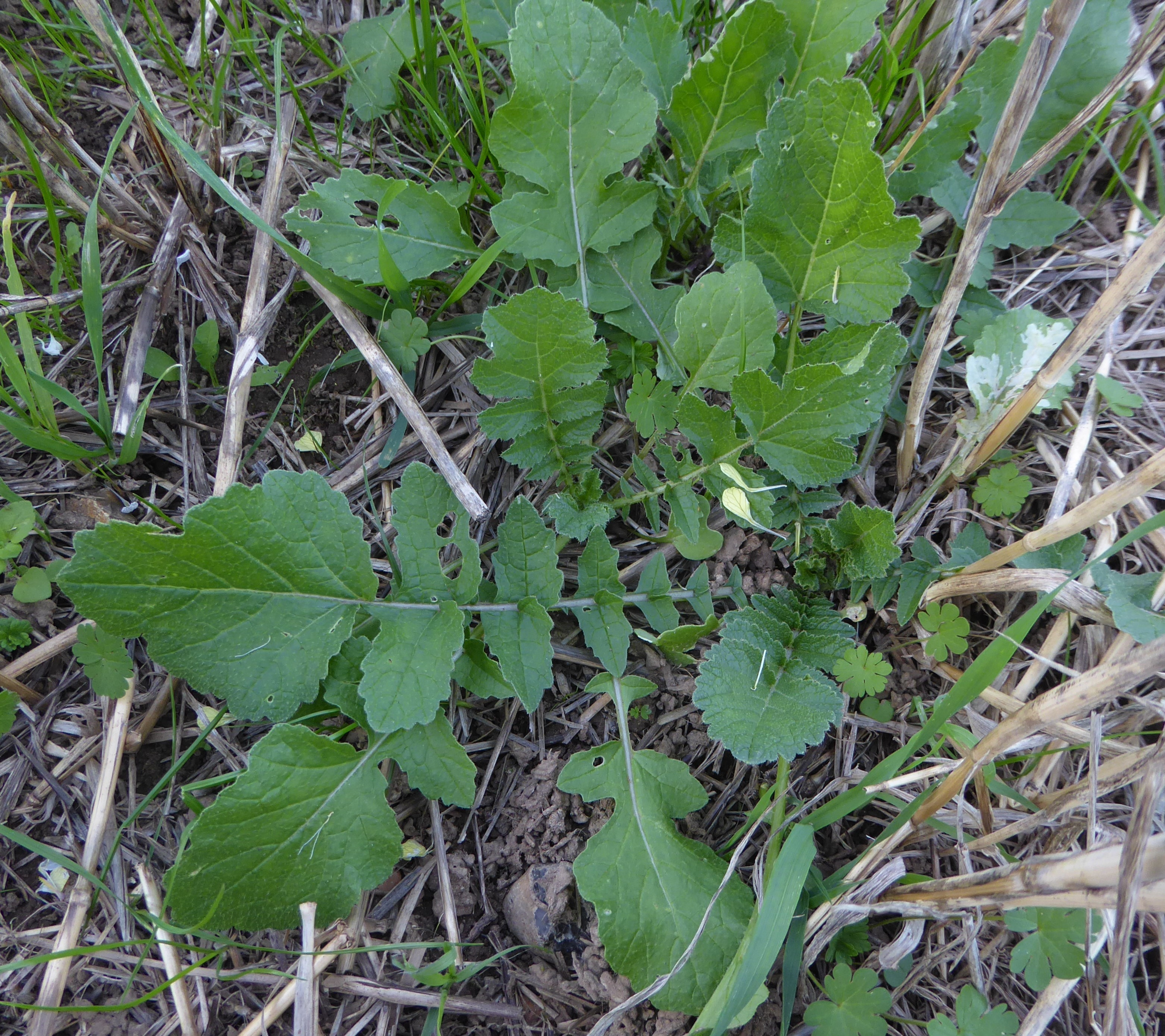
The basal leaves are often pinnately divided.

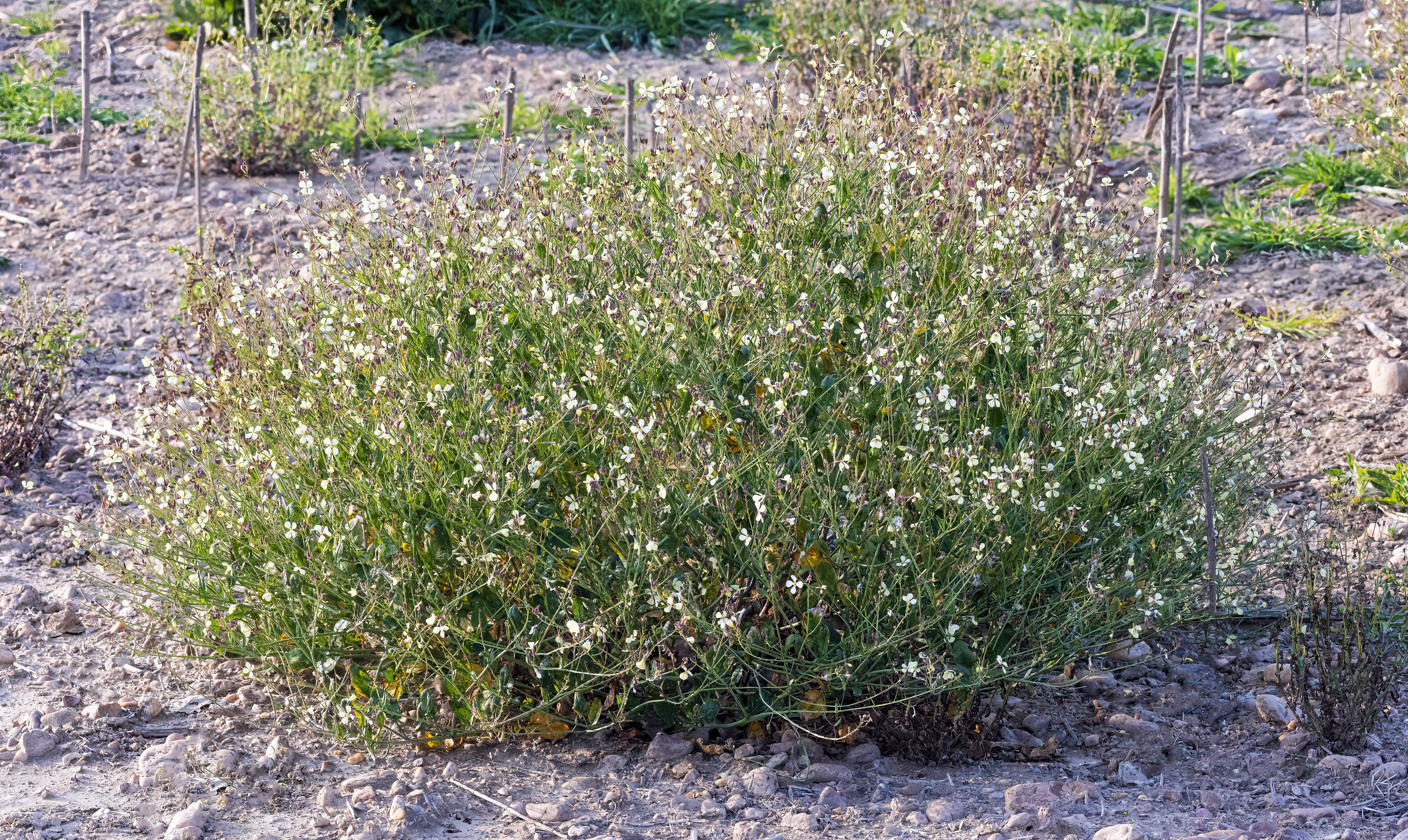
Habitat and distribution

The flowering period is between May and October in northern Europe, or between June and August in Minnesota. The inflorescence is a lax raceme, terminal or arising from the leaf axil, up to 34 cm long with up to 42 flowers. The flowers have four white (sometimes yellow or purple) petals, up to 24 mm long, sometimes with dark veins (especially on the underside). Each petal has a rounded "limb" above a narrow "claw", both about the same length. The four upright sepals are shorter than the petals, green or purple, and have sparse bulbous-based hairs. There are 6 stamens (2 short and 4 long) and one style with two stigmas.

The fruits are borne on bristly-hairy pedicels about 3 cm long and held vertically (whether the rhachis is erect or sprawling). Each fruit consists of a pod with two segments: the lower one is about 1-2 mm long and sterile (just occasionally with one seed), while the upper one is up to 8 cm long and has 1–10 fertile segments (mericarps), each containing one oval seed up to 3 mm long. At the tip of the pod is a sterile beak up to 2.5 cm long. The fruits are terete, smooth or slightly ridged, and glabrous to roughly hairy, with a peppery taste. At the tip of the beak is the persistent, sessile white stigma.

=== Similar species ===
The flowers are very similar to those of the searocket, which is found in some of the same regions (in the US) and is easily distinguished from it by having thinner, non-succulent stems and leaves.

== Taxonomy ==
It was formally described by the Swedish botanist Carl Linnaeus in his seminal publication Species Plantarum in 1753.

The genome of wild radish is estimated to be ~515 Mb in size, whereas that of the edible variety is suggested to be ~539–574 Mb. Several Raphanus raphanistrum genomes have been sequenced, with one study reporting 98% coverage of the gene space. Researchers found evidence that the past whole-genome triplication that occurred before the divergence of Raphanus and Brassica has been followed by widespread gene loss in radish, resulting in the loss of ~38,000 genes from the wild radish genome.

Raphanus raphanistrum has several known subspecies including:

- Raphanus raphanistrum subsp. landra (Moretti ex DC.) Bonnier & Layens ('sea radish')
- Raphanus raphanistrum subsp. rostratus (DC.) Thell.
- Raphanus raphanistrum subsp. sativus (L.) Domin

The scientific name Raphanus derives from the Ancient Greek name for a radish, ραφανίς (raphanis). It has several common names including jointed charlock, jointed radish, jointed wild radish, white charlock, and wild radish.

It is often erroneously identified as mustard.

== Distribution and habitat ==
It is native to temperate regions of North Africa, Europe and parts of Western Asia.

=== Range ===
It is found in North Africa, within Macaronesia, Madeira Islands, Canary Islands, Algeria, Egypt, Libya, Morocco and Tunisia. Within Western Asia it is found in the Caucasus, Armenia, Azerbaijan, Cyprus, Georgia, Iran, Iraq, Israel, Jordan, Lebanon, Syria and Turkey. In eastern Europe, it is found within Belarus, Moldova and Ukraine. In middle Europe, it is in Austria, Belgium, Czech Republic, Germany, Hungary, Netherlands, Poland, Slovakia and Switzerland. In northern Europe, in Denmark, Estonia, Finland, Ireland, Isle of Man, Latvia, Lithuania, Norway, Sweden and United Kingdom. In southeastern Europe, within Albania, Bosnia and Herzegovina, Bulgaria, Croatia, Greece, Italy, Montenegro, North Macedonia, Romania, Serbia and Slovenia. Also in southwestern Europe, it is found in France, Portugal and Spain.

== Ecology ==
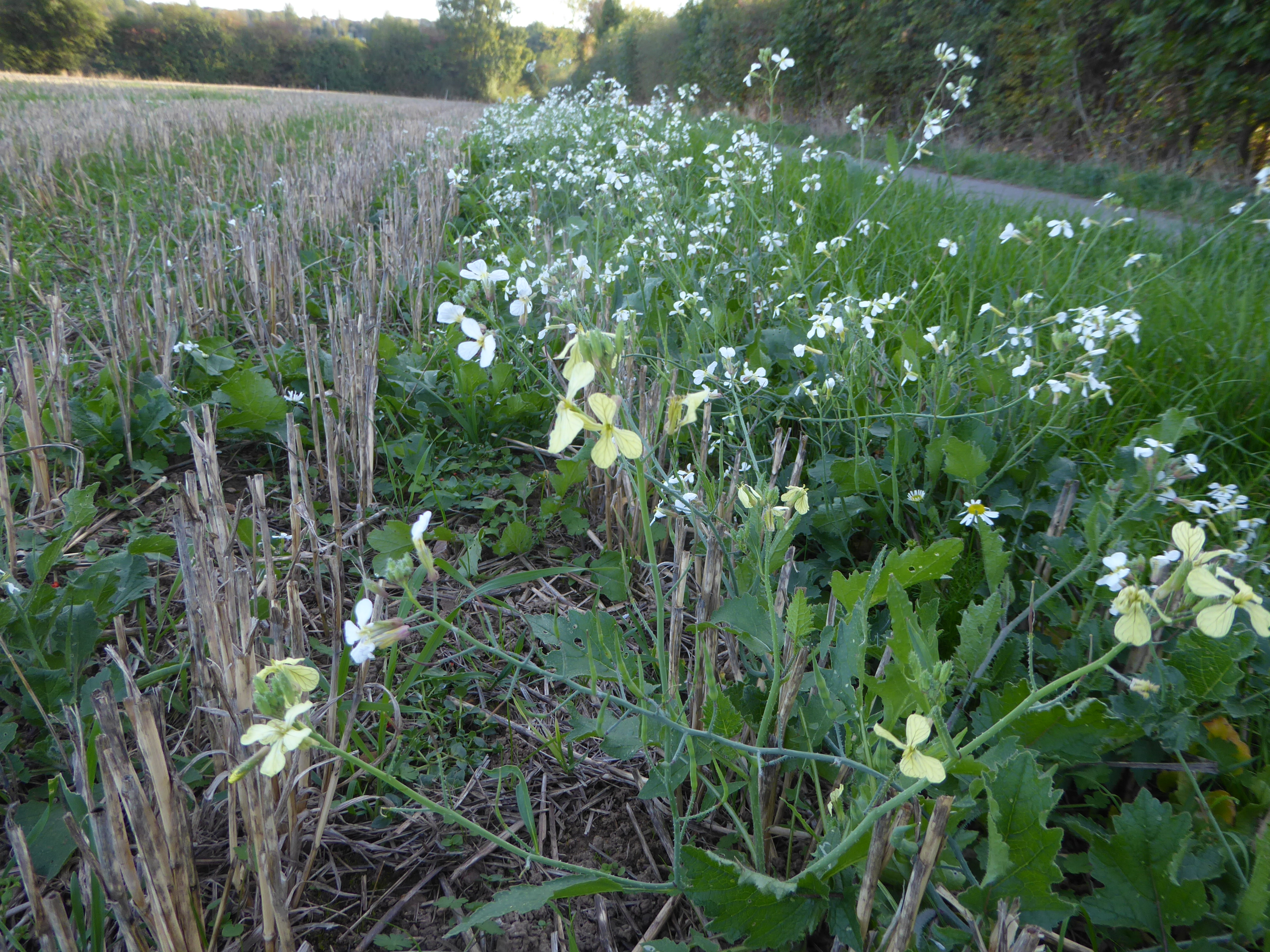
Wild radish in a cereal field margin

It is frost hardy, and even hard freezes only temporarily interrupt bloom. In Australia, it is regarded as a habitat threatening invasive species in many areas. In Canada, it is a naturalised species and sometimes hybridizes with cultivated radish, R. sativus. It has also proved to be resistant to several herbicides.

In southeastern USA, the pale yellow form is common, sometimes entirely taking over fields in wintertime. It is a significant source of pollen and nectar for a variety of pollinators, especially honey bees during the very early spring starting buildup. Female Andrena agilissima, or mining bees, frequent this plant to obtain pollen and nectar. Other pollinators include cabbage butterflies and a few syrphid fly species.

== Uses ==
All tender parts of the plant are edible. The leaves and flowers have a spicy taste or aftertaste. The seedpods can be eaten, as can the outer skin of the root (after being washed). It is said that John Walker cultivated sea radish root as an alternative to horseradish after discovering the plant on the west coast of Scotland as early as 1753.

== Gallery ==
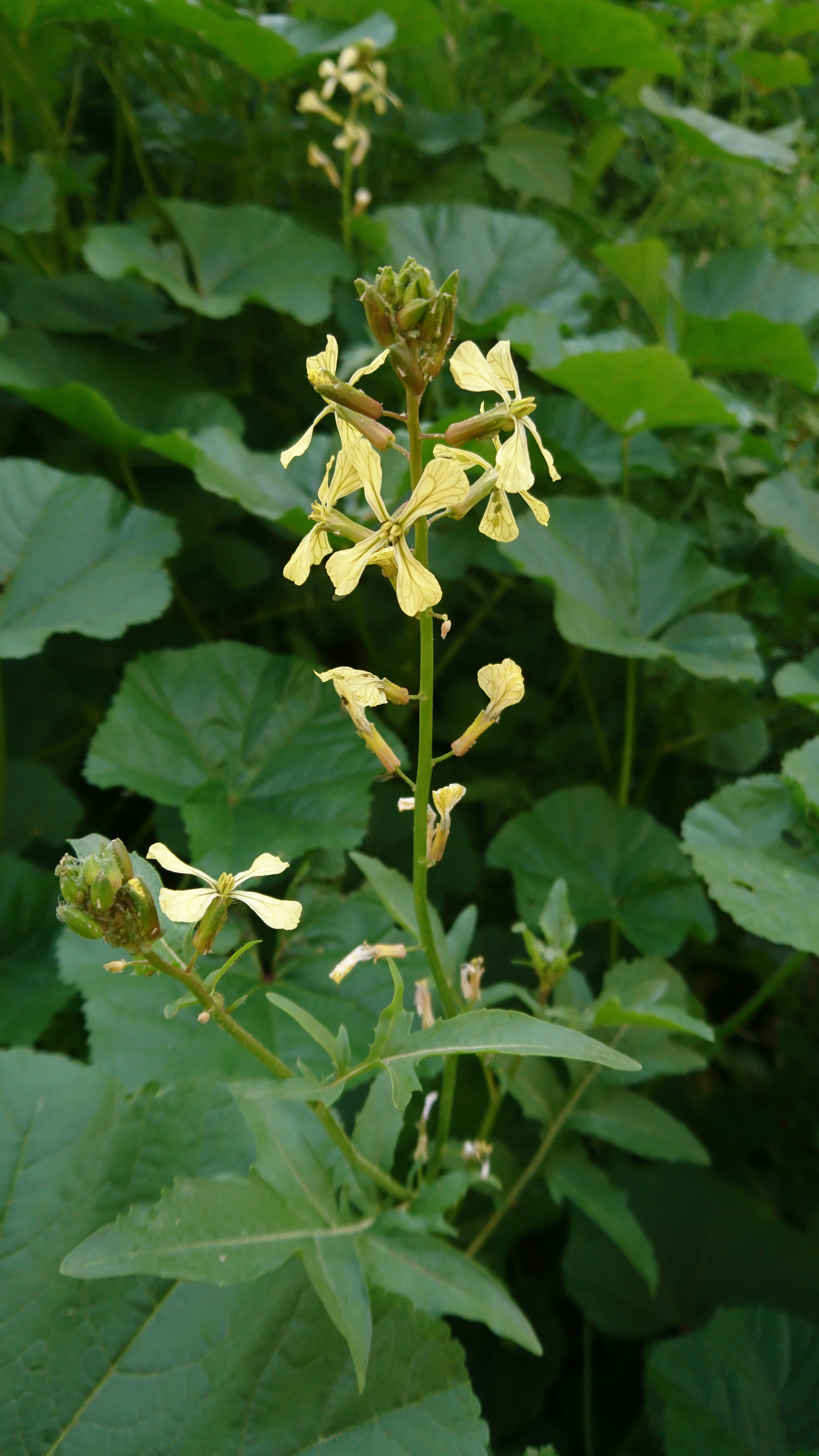
Foliage

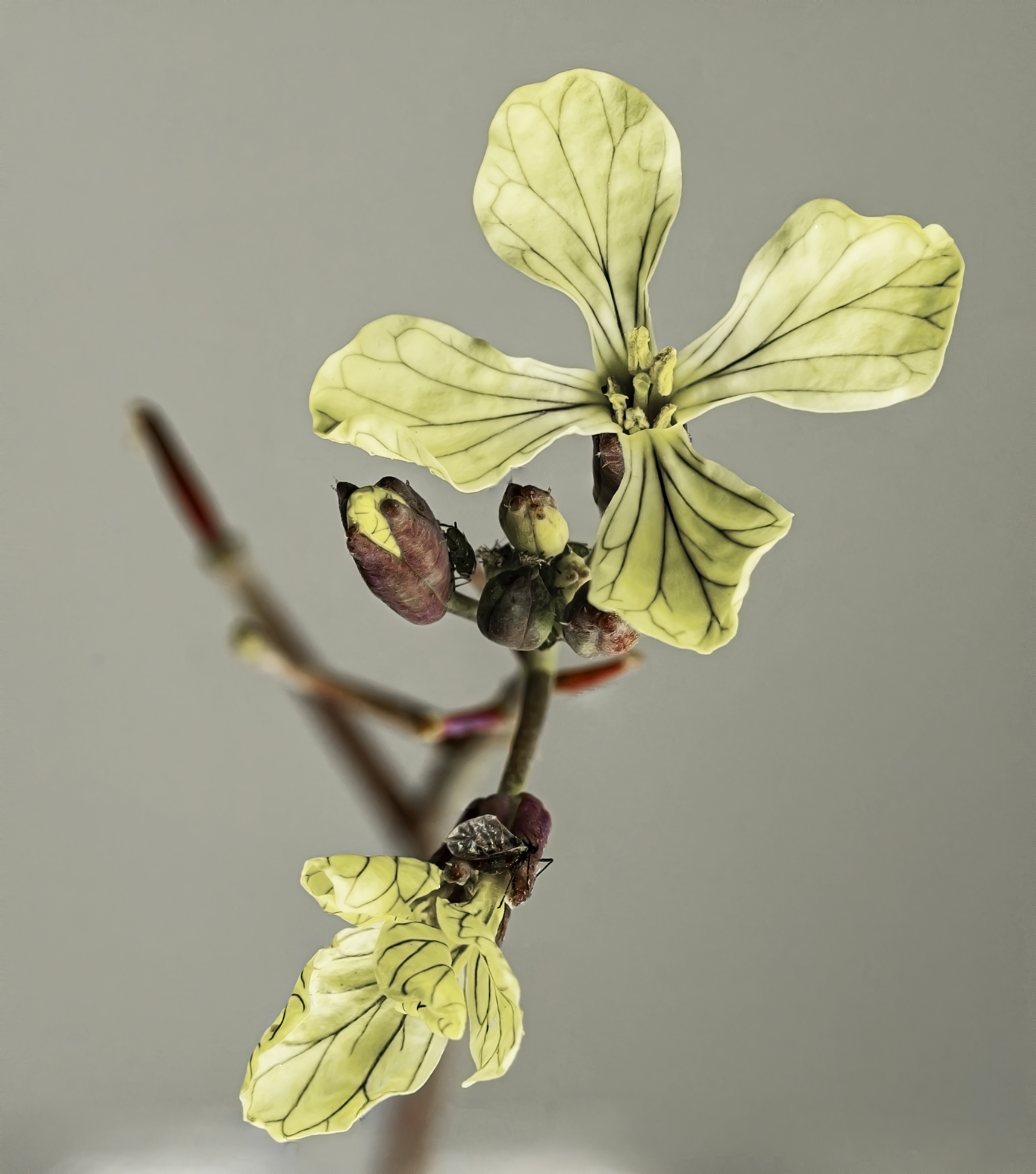
Yellow form

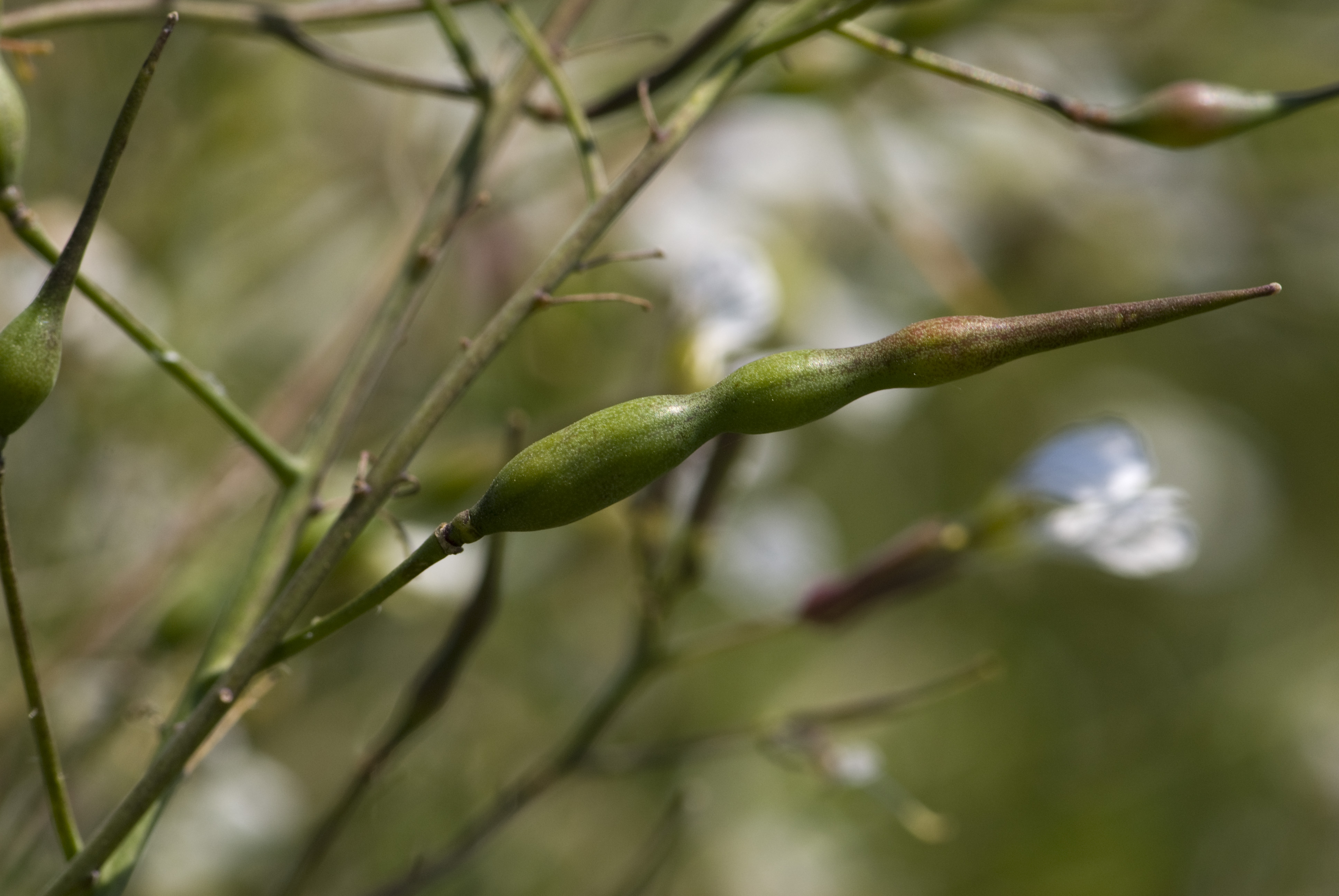
Seed pod

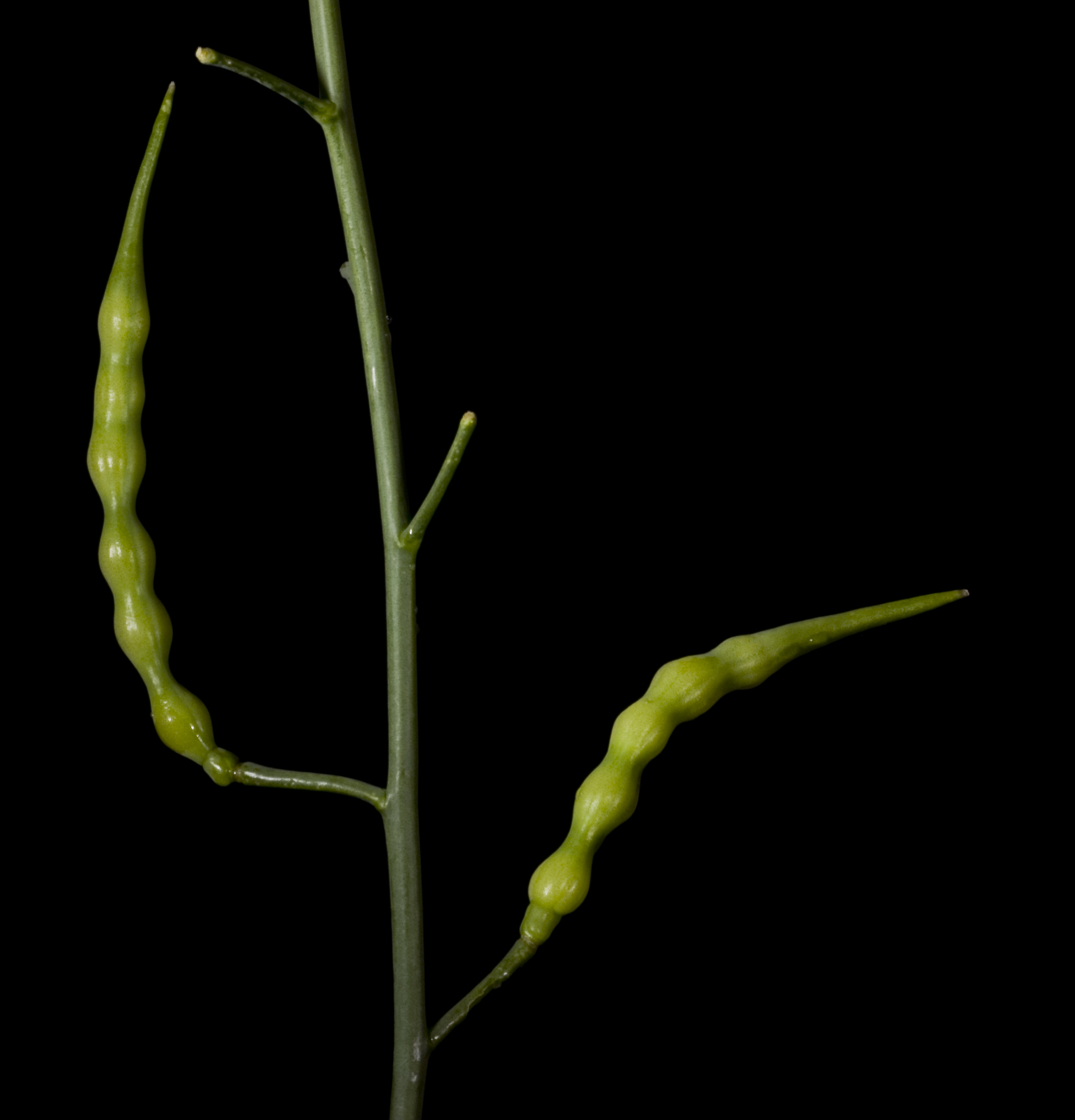
Fruit
