= Ancylandrena larreae =

Scientific classification
- Domain: Eukaryota
- Kingdom: Animalia
- Phylum: Arthropoda
- Class: Insecta
- Order: Hymenoptera
- Family: Andrenidae
- Genus: Ancylandrena
- Species: A. larreae

Binomial name
- Ancylandrena larreae (Timberlake, 1951)

Species of bee

Ancylandrena larreae, the creosote bush ancylandrena, is a species of mining bee in the family Andrenidae. It is found in Central America and North America.
