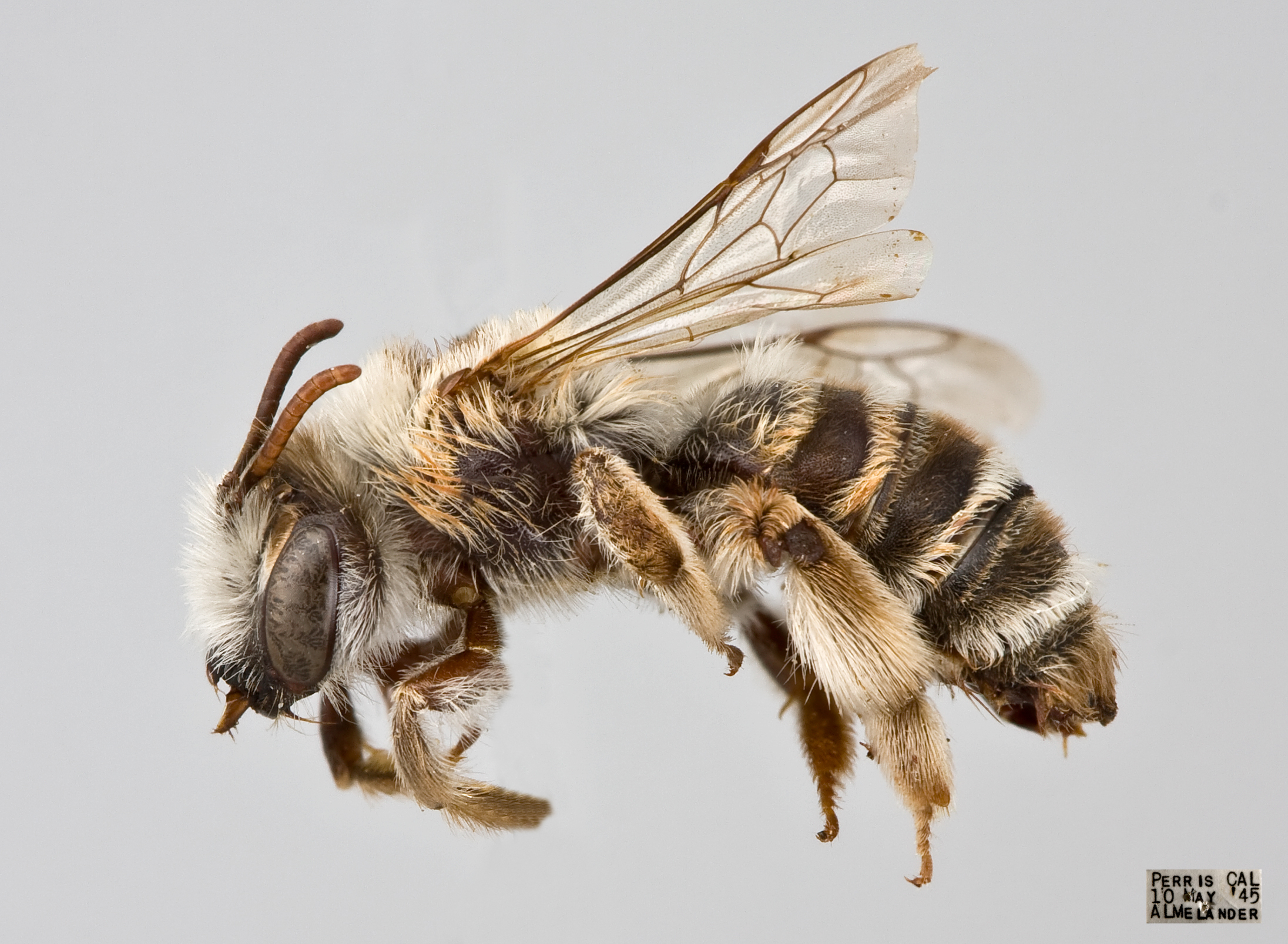

Scientific classification
- Kingdom: Animalia
- Phylum: Arthropoda
- Class: Insecta
- Order: Hymenoptera
- Family: Andrenidae
- Subfamily: Andreninae
- Genus: Ancylandrena; Cockerell, 1930

= Ancylandrena =

Genus of bees

Ancylandrena is a genus of mining bees in the family Andrenidae. There are about five described species in Ancylandrena.

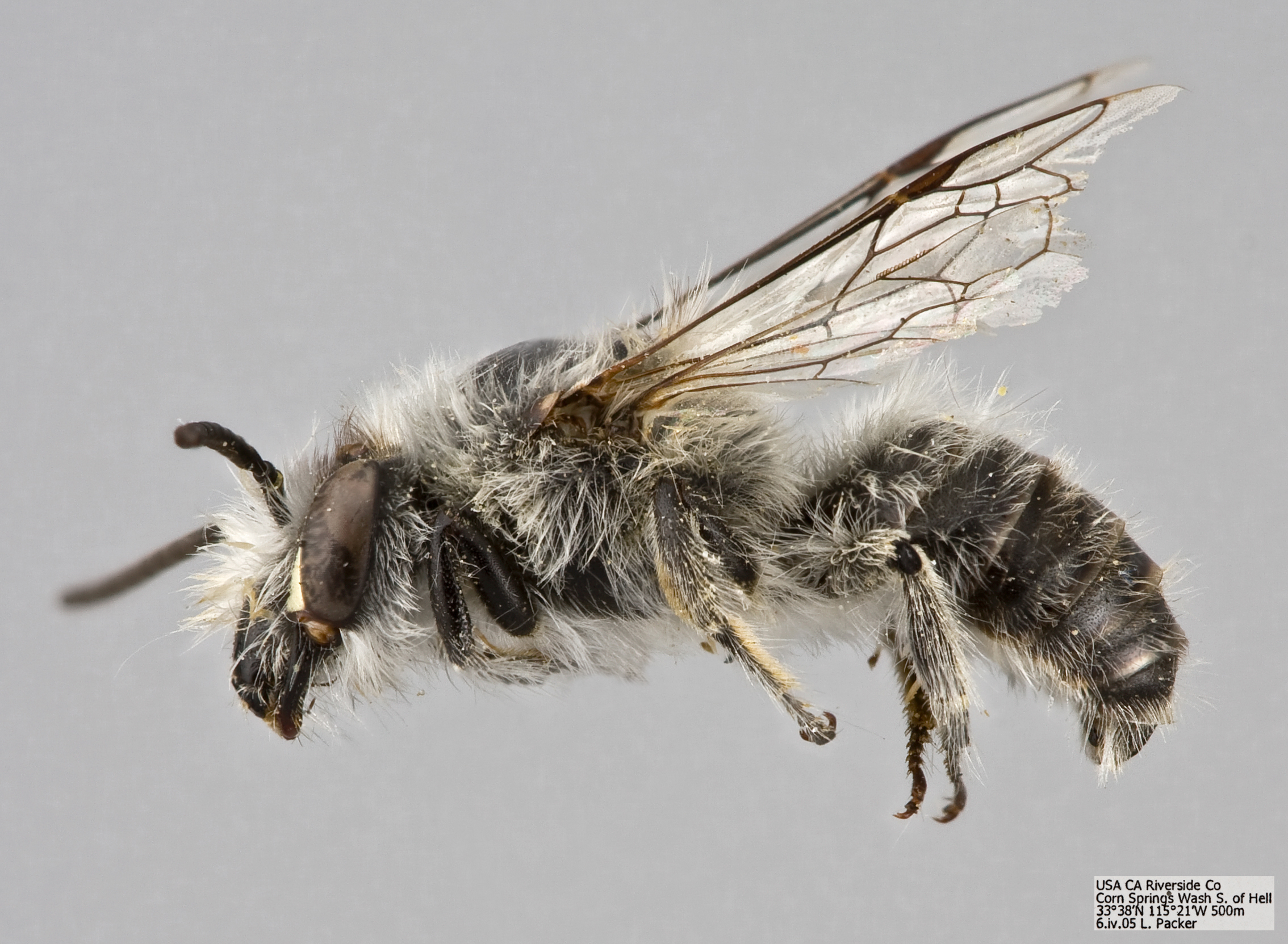

== Species ==
These five species belong to the genus Ancylandrena:

- Ancylandrena atoposoma (Cockerell, 1934)
- Ancylandrena koebelei (Timberlake, 1951)
- Ancylandrena larreae (Timberlake, 1951) (creosote bush ancylandrena)
- Ancylandrena rozeni Zavortink, 1994
- Ancylandrena timberlakei Zavortink, 1974
