= Megandrena enceliae =

Scientific classification
- Kingdom: Animalia
- Phylum: Arthropoda
- Class: Insecta
- Order: Hymenoptera
- Family: Andrenidae
- Genus: Megandrena
- Species: M. enceliae

Binomial name
- Megandrena enceliae (Cockerell, 1927)

Species of bee

Megandrena enceliae, the encelia megandrena, is a species of mining bee in the family Andrenidae. It is found in North America.
