= Ancylandrena rozeni =

Scientific classification
- Domain: Eukaryota
- Kingdom: Animalia
- Phylum: Arthropoda
- Class: Insecta
- Order: Hymenoptera
- Family: Andrenidae
- Genus: Ancylandrena
- Species: A. rozeni

Binomial name
- Ancylandrena rozeni Zavortink, 1994

Species of bee

Ancylandrena rozeni is a species of mining bee in the family Andrenidae. It is found in Central America and North America.
