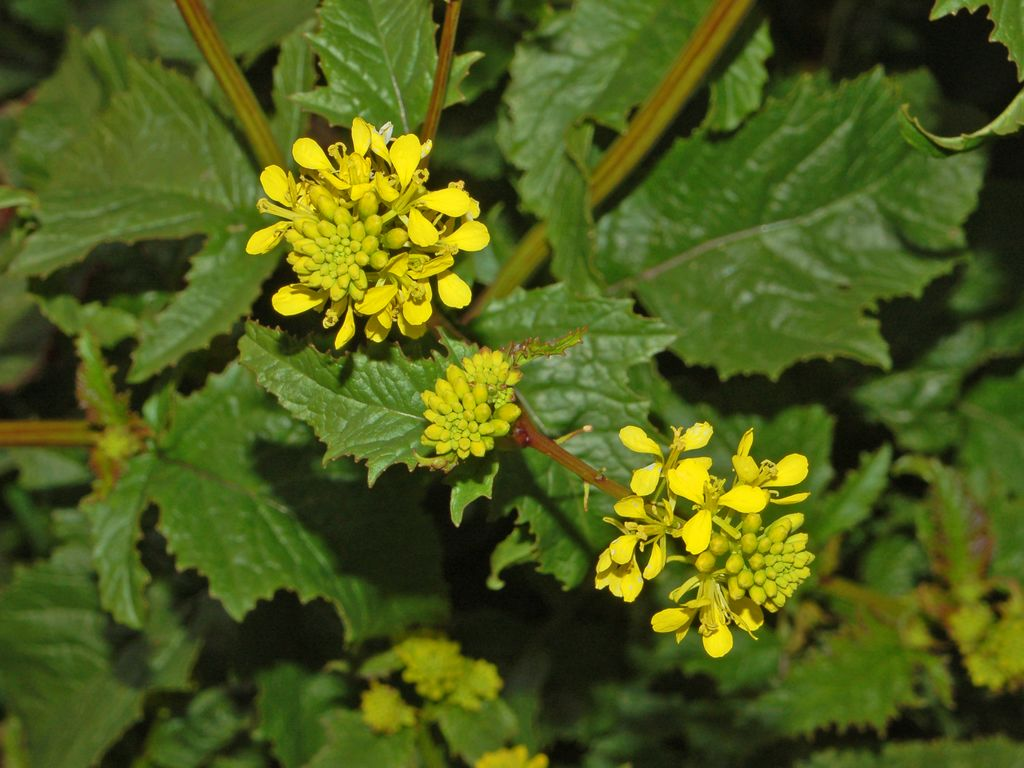

Scientific classification
- Kingdom: Plantae
- Clade: Embryophytes
- Clade: Tracheophytes
- Clade: Spermatophytes
- Clade: Angiosperms
- Clade: Eudicots
- Clade: Rosids
- Order: Brassicales
- Family: Brassicaceae
- Genus: Rhamphospermum
- Species: R. arvense

Binomial name
- Rhamphospermum arvense (L.) Andrz. ex Besser

Synonyms
- See § Synonyms

= Rhamphospermum arvense =

Species of plant

Rhamphospermum arvense, (syns. Brassica arvensis and Sinapis arvensis) the charlock, sometimes also called field mustard, wild mustard, or charlock mustard, is an annual or winter annual plant in the family Brassicaceae. It is found in the fields of North Africa, Asia, Europe, and some other areas where it has been transported and naturalised. Pieris rapae, the small white butterfly, and Pieris napi, the green veined white butterfly, are significant consumers of charlock during their larval stages.

== Description ==
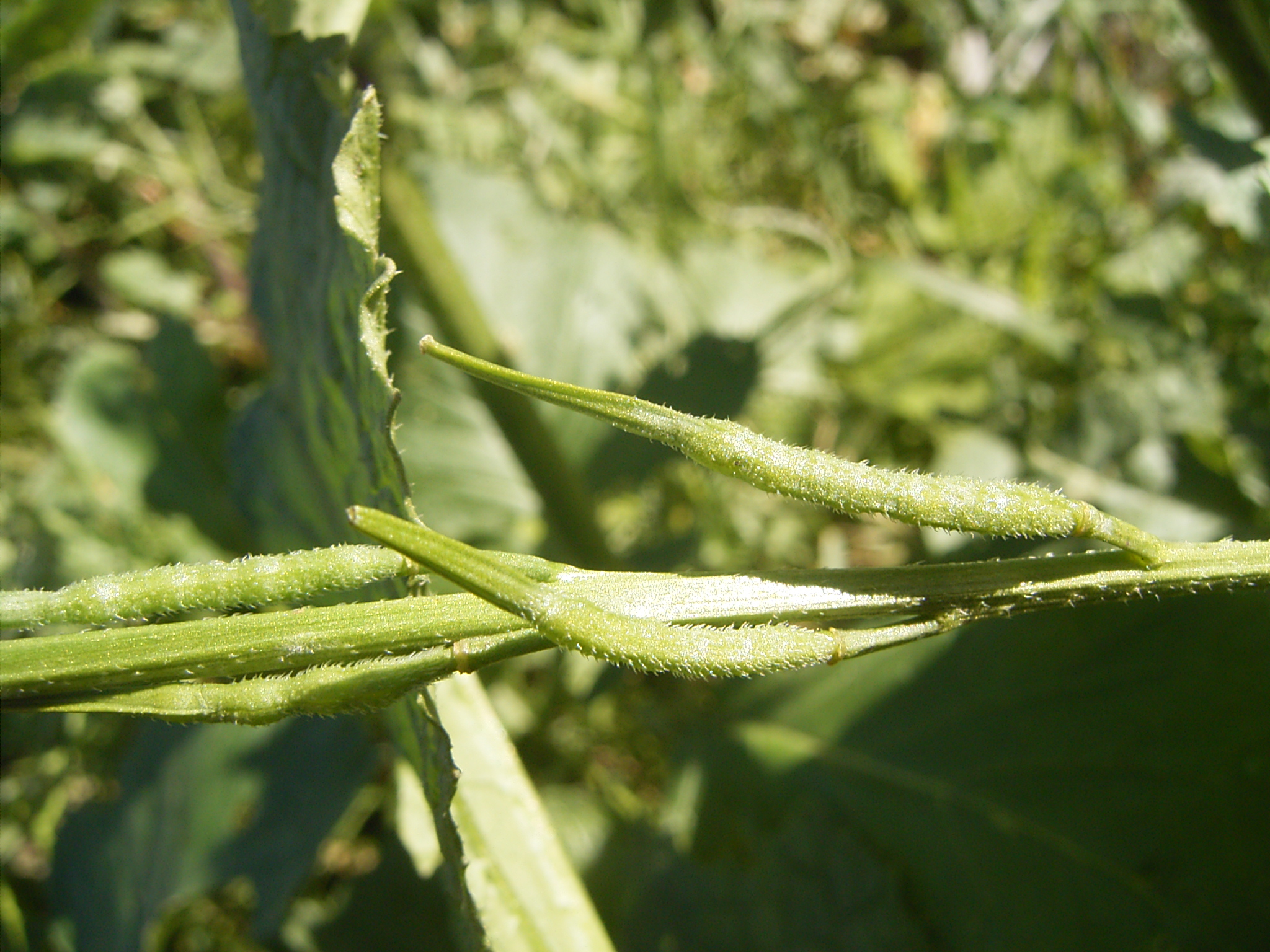
Seedpods

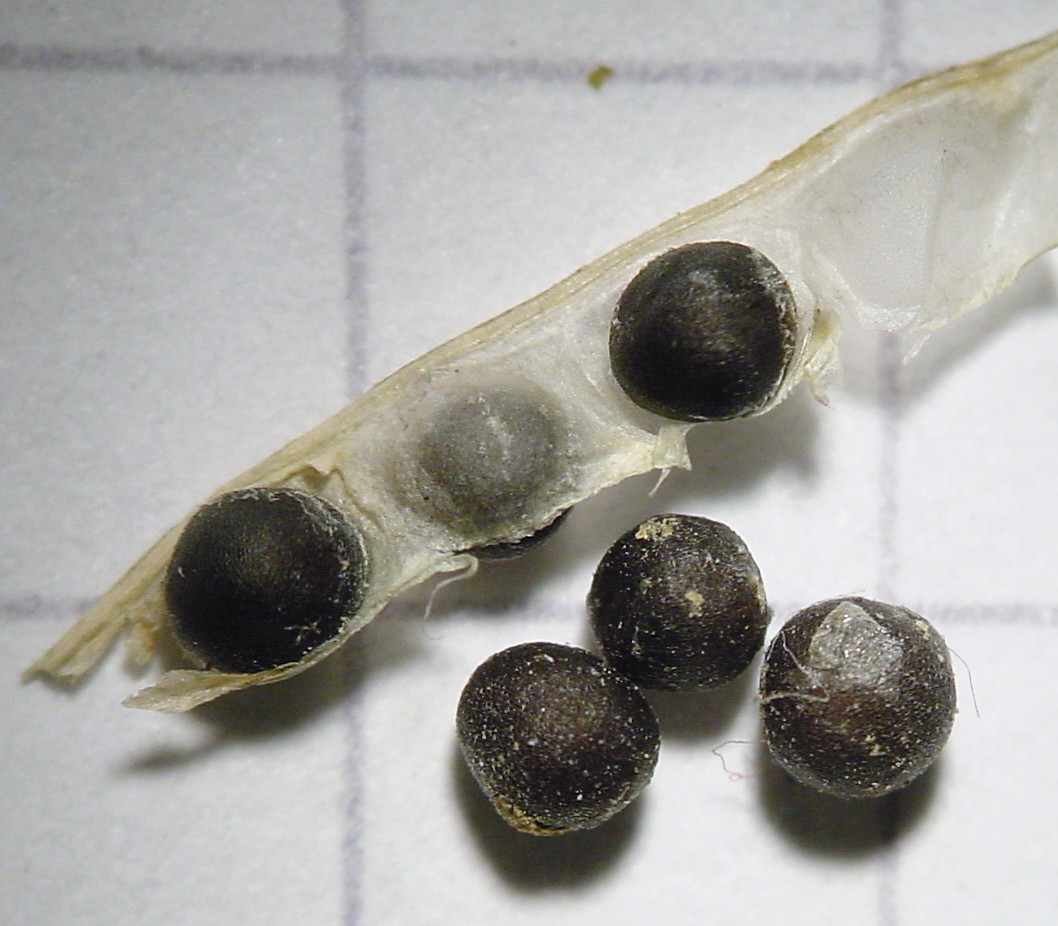
Seeds

Charlock reaches on average 20–100 cm (8–39 in) in height, but under optimal conditions can exceed one metre. The stems are erect, branched or unbranched, striated, with coarse spreading hairs especially near the base. The leaves are petiolate (stalked) with a 1–4 cm (0.4–1.6 in) petiole. The basal leaves are oblong, oval, lanceolate, lyrate, pinnatifid to dentate, 4–18 cm (1.6–7.1 in) long, 2–5 cm (0.8–2.0 in) wide. The cauline leaves are much reduced and are short petiolate to sessile but not auriculate-clasping. It blooms from May to September, or May to August, in the UK. The inflorescence is a raceme made up of yellow flowers having four petals 6–13 mm long, with spreading sepals just over half the length of the petals. The fruit is a silique 2.5–5 cm long with a beak 0.7–2 cm long that is flattened-quadrangular. The valves of the silique are glabrous or rarely bristly, three to five nerved. The seeds are dark red or brown, smooth 1-1.5 mm in diameter.

=== Phytochemistry ===
It contains chemicals of the class glucosinolates, including sinalbin. The seeds contain a plant hormone, gibberellic acid, which effects the dormancy of the seeds.

== Taxonomy ==
It was formally described by the Swedish botanist Carl Linnaeus in his seminal publication 'Species Plantarum' on page 668 in 1753.

It is commonly known as charlock, or sometimes as charlock mustard, field mustard, or wild mustard.

=== Synonyms ===
List
  - Brassica arvensis (L.) Rabenh.
  - Brassica arvensis var. orientalis (L.) Farw.
  - Brassica arvensis var. schkuhriana (Rchb.) Thell.
  - Brassica barbareifolia Ball
  - Brassica kaber (DC.) Wheeler
  - Brassica kaber var. orientalis (L.) Scoggan
  - Brassica kaber var. pinnatifida (Stokes) L.C.Wheeler
  - Brassica kaber var. schkuhriana (Rchb.) L.C.Wheeler
  - Brassica kaber var. stricta (Čelak.) Shinners
  - Brassica mesopotamica (Spreng.) Bernh.
  - Brassica nigra var. villosa (Mérat) Alef.
  - Brassica sinapis Vis.
  - Brassica sinapistrum Boiss.
  - Brassica sinapistrum f. brachycarpa N.Busch
  - Brassica sinapistrum var. orientalis Samp.
  - Brassica sinapistrum proles schkuhriana (Rchb.) Samp.
  - Brassica sinapistrum var. schkuhriana (Rchb.) Samp.
  - Brassica sinapistrum var. siliqua-hirsuta Boiss.
  - Brassica xinjiangensis Y.C.Lan & T.Y.Cheo
  - Crucifera sinapistra E.H.L.Krause
  - Napus agriasinapis K.F.Schimp. & Spenn.
  - Raphanus arvensis (L.) Crantz
  - Raphanus orientalis (L.) Crantz
  - Raphanus turgidus Pers.
  - Rhamphospermum orientale (L.) Andrz.
  - Sinapis allionii Jacq.
  - Sinapis arvensis L.
  - Sinapis arvensis subsp. allionii (Jacq.) Baillarg.
  - Sinapis arvensis var. ambigua Hartm.
  - Sinapis arvensis subsp. dasycarpa (Neilr.) Arcang.
  - Sinapis arvensis var. divaricata O.E.Schulz
  - Sinapis arvensis var. longistylosa Sennen
  - Sinapis arvensis var. mesopotamica (Spreng.) Boiss.
  - Sinapis arvensis f. orientalis (L.) D.Löve & J.-P.Bernard
  - Sinapis arvensis subsp. orientalis (L.) Bonnier
  - Sinapis arvensis var. orientalis (L.) W.D.J.Koch & Ziz
  - Sinapis arvensis var. pinnatifida Stokes
  - Sinapis arvensis var. retrohirsuta Bab.
  - Sinapis arvensis var. schkuhriana (Rchb.) Hagenb.
  - Sinapis arvensis var. stricta Čelak.
  - Sinapis arvensis var. vera Bab.
  - Sinapis arvensis var. villosa (Mérat) Rouy & Foucaud
  - Sinapis hispida Balb.
  - Sinapis incana Thuill.
  - Sinapis kaber DC.
  - Sinapis mesopotamica Spreng.
  - Sinapis nigra var. villosa (Mérat) DC.
  - Sinapis orientalis L.
  - Sinapis polymorpha Geners. ex Schult.
  - Sinapis retrohirsuta Besser ex Steud.
  - Sinapis retrohispida Boreau
  - Sinapis schkuhriana Rchb.
  - Sinapis schlosseri Heuff. ex Nyman
  - Sinapis taurica Fisch.
  - Sinapis torosa Gilib.
  - Sinapis turgida (Pers.) Delile
  - Sinapis villosa Mérat
  - Sinapistrum arvense (L.) Spach

=== Etymology ===
The former generic name Sinapis derives from the Greek word sinapi meaning 'mustard' and was the old name used by Theophrastus for any mustard. The specific epithet arvense is a Latin adjective meaning 'from/of the field'.

== Distribution ==
A native of the Mediterranean basin, from temperate regions of North Africa, Europe and parts of Asia. It has also become naturalised throughout much of North America, South America, Australia, Japan and South Africa.

=== Range ===
It is found in North Africa, within Algeria, Egypt, Libya, Morocco and Tunisia. Within Asia, it is found in Arabian Peninsula (in Kuwait, Oman, Qatar, Saudi Arabia and the United Arab Emirates), Armenia, Azerbaijan, the Caucasus, China, Georgia, Iran, Iraq, Israel, Jordan, Kazakhstan, Kyrgyzstan, Lebanon, Siberia, Syria, Tajikistan, Turkmenistan and Uzbekistan. It is also found in tropical Pakistan. In eastern Europe, it is found within Belarus, Estonia, Latvia, Lithuania, Moldova and Ukraine. In middle Europe, it is in Austria, Belgium, the Czech Republic, Germany, Hungary, the Netherlands, Poland, Slovakia and Switzerland. In northern Europe, in Denmark, Finland, Ireland, Norway, Sweden and the United Kingdom. In southeastern Europe, within Albania, Bosnia and Herzegovina, Bulgaria, Croatia, Greece, Italy, Montenegro, North Macedonia, Romania, Serbia and Slovenia. Also in southwestern Europe, it is found in France, Portugal and Spain.

== Habitat ==
It grows in the plains and mountains, in pastures, fields, roadsides, waste places (such as railways, tips, and waste ground), and ruins, but mainly in cultivated places. It prefers calcareous soils in sunny places, at an altitude of 0–1,400 m (0–4,600 ft) above sea level.

== Ecology ==
The flowers are pollinated by various bees like Andrena agilissima and flies (entomophily). Rhamphospermum arvense is the host plant of the caterpillars of some Lepidoptera, such as the small white, Pieris rapae. The seeds are toxic to most animals, except birds, and can cause gastrointestinal problems, especially if consumed in large quantities.

It is a highly invasive species in states such as California.

== Uses ==
Charlock leaves are edible at the juvenile stage of the plant; they are usually boiled, such as in 18th century, in Dublin, where it was sold in the streets. During the Great Famine of Ireland, wild mustard was a common famine food, even though it often caused stomach upset. Once the seeds are ground, they produce a kind of mustard.

A type of oil can be extracted from the seed which has been used for lubricating machinery.

== As ruminant feed ==
Grazing charlock at growing and flowering stages is harmless for cattle and sheep. Poisoning can occur in the same animals when fed with older seed-bearing plants. This can occur when wild mustard grows as a weed in green-fed rapeseed or cereals. Accidental consumption of charlock oil can also be the cause of reported intoxications.

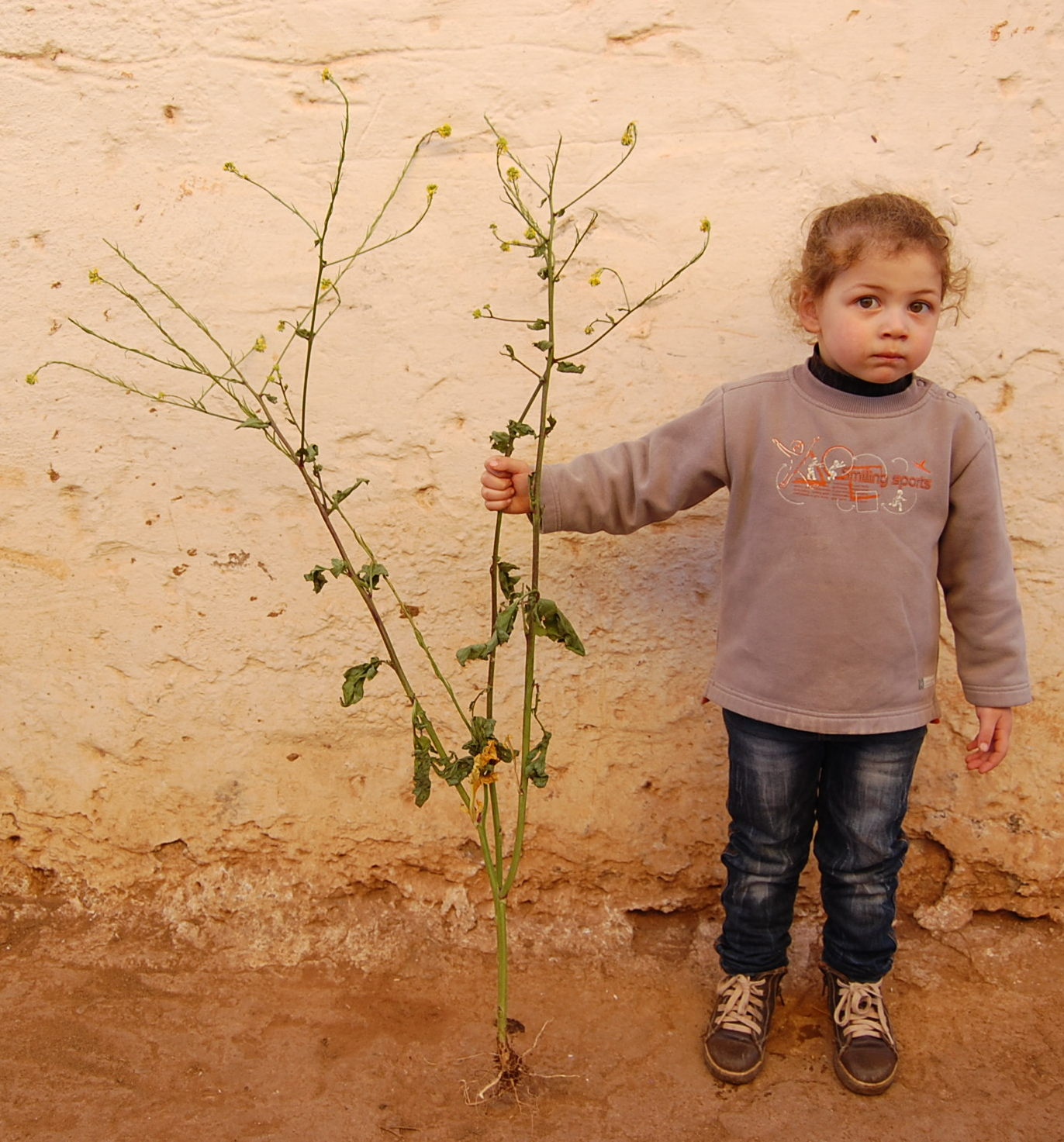
Plant more than 1 metre tall

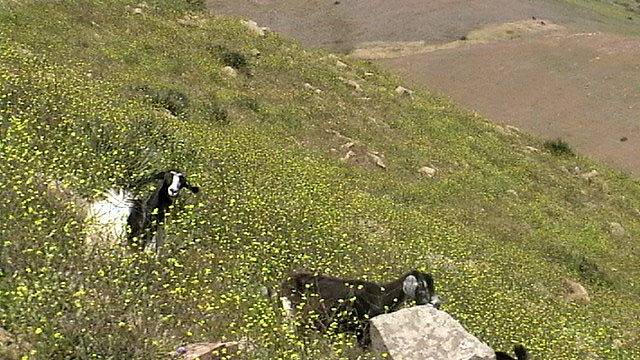
Goats grazing in mountain pasture with charlock

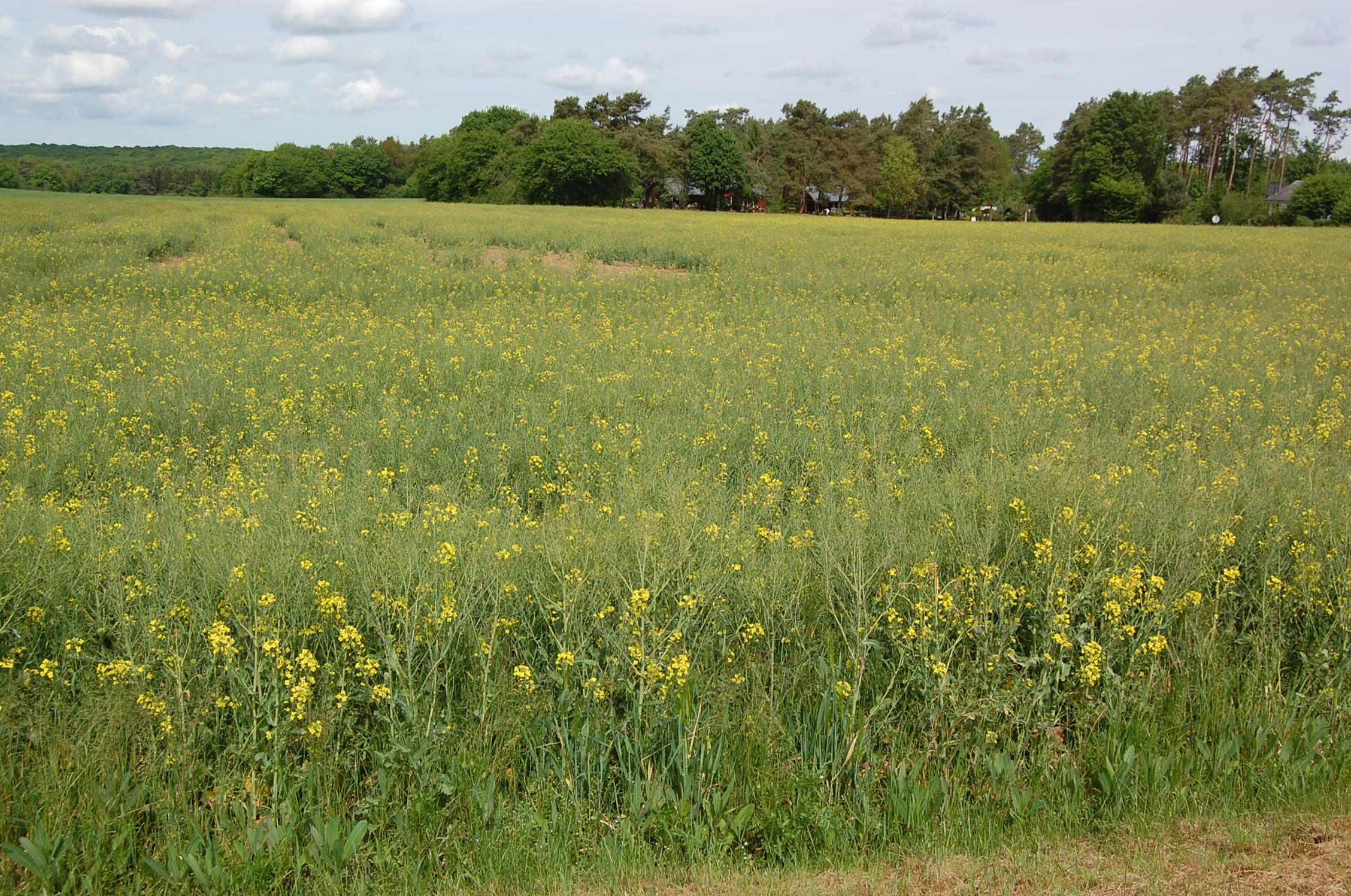
Fallow dominated by charlock

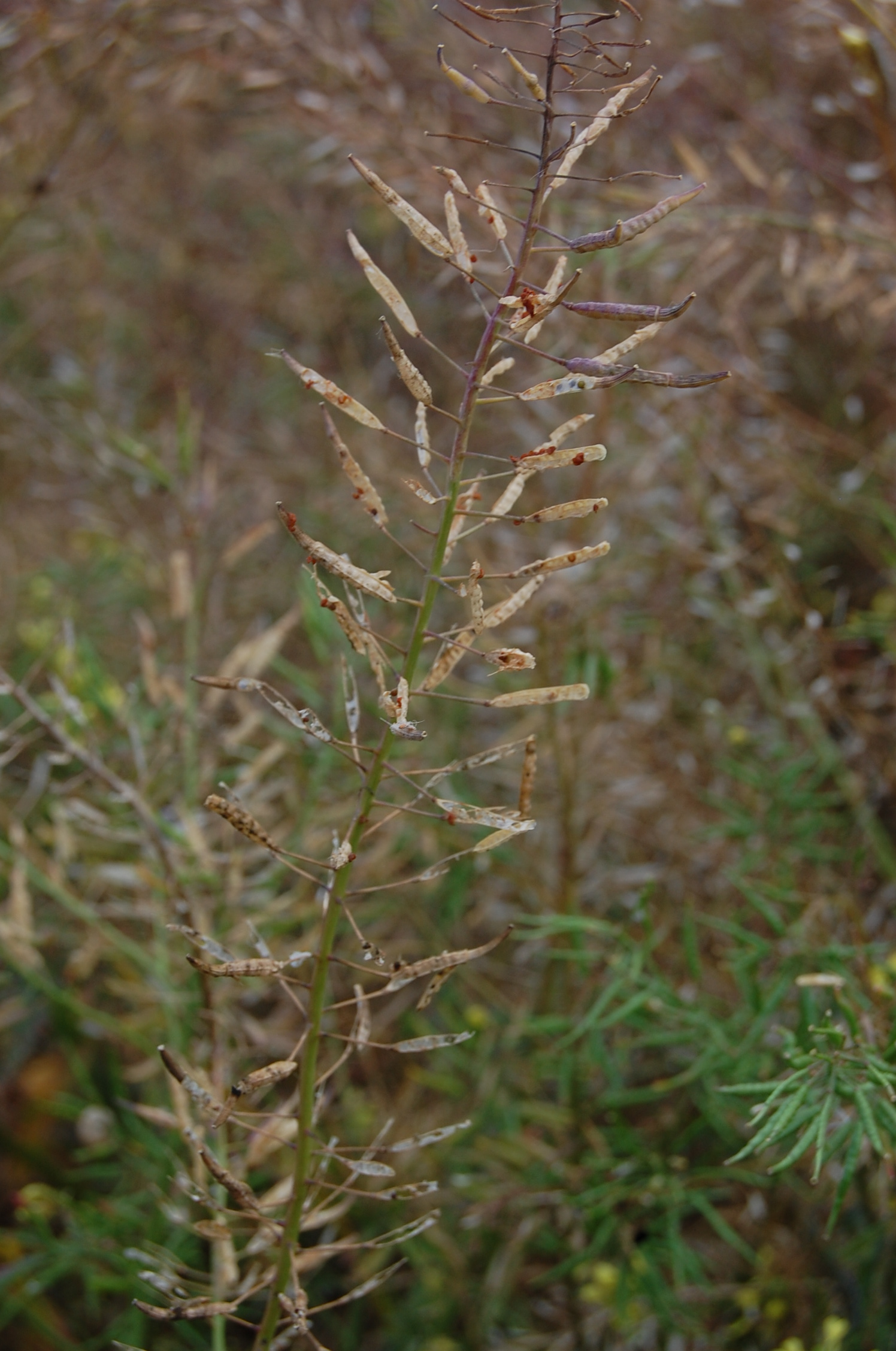
Individual mature plant

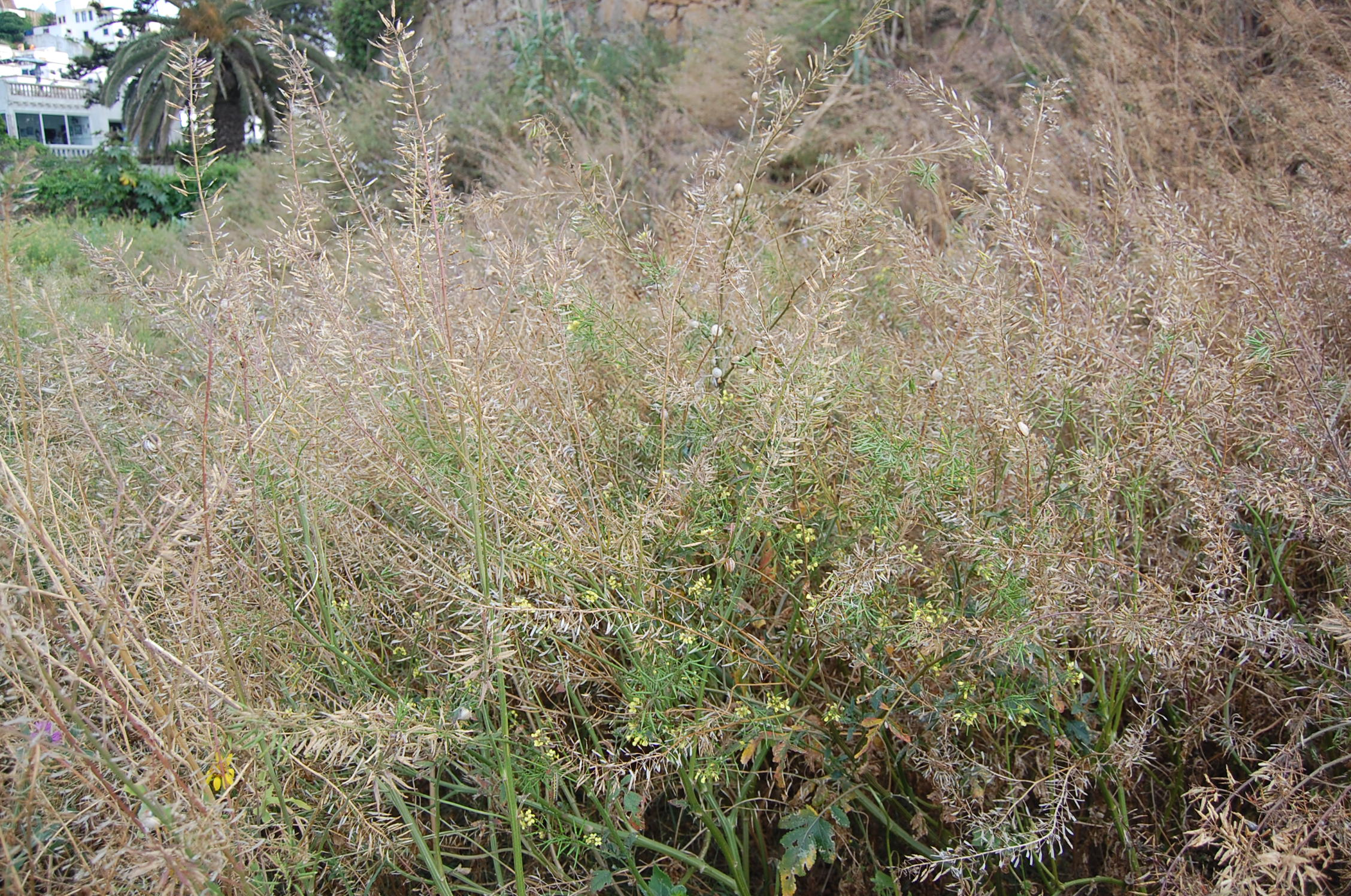
Potentially toxic mature plants

== See also ==
- Sinapis alba, known as "yellow mustard" or "white mustard"
