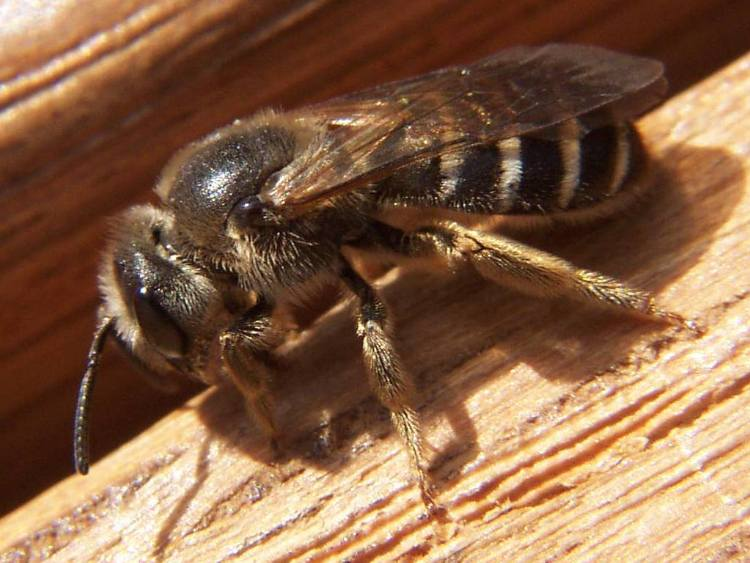
- Andrena miserabilis

Scientific classification
- Domain: Eukaryota
- Kingdom: Animalia
- Phylum: Arthropoda
- Class: Insecta
- Order: Hymenoptera
- Family: Andrenidae
- Subfamily: Andreninae

Genera
- Ancylandrena; Andrena; Euherbstia; Megandrena; Orphana

= Andreninae =

Subfamily of bees

The bee subfamily Andreninae is a nearly cosmopolitan lineage, with most of its diversity in one genus, Andrena, which contains over 1500 species. The remaining four genera in the subfamily only contain a total of 9 species.

Females of three of the genera (Ancylandrena, Andrena, and Megandrena) have broad, velvety depressions called "facial foveae" on the face between the eyes and the antennae; in all other members of the family, the foveae are much smaller, typically reduced to grooves or pits at the upper margin of the eyes. Ancylandrena and Megandrena occur only in the desert regions of southwestern North America (Nevada, California, Arizona, Sonora, and Baja California), while Andrena is nearly worldwide. Euherbstia and Orphana are rare bees restricted to desert regions of Chile.

Unlike the subfamily Panurginae, none of the species of Andreninae have yellow markings anywhere other than on the face; those markings, when present, are usually found only in males.

== Genera ==
- Ancylandrena
- Andrena
- Euherbstia
- Megandrena
- Orphana
